= Structure of the Romanian Land Forces =

The current structure of the Romanian Land Forces is as follows:

== Structure ==
Romanian Land Forces organization as of October 2026 (click image to enlarge)

== Land Forces Command ==
- General Headquarters in Bucharest
  - 13th Communication and Informatics Center "Colonel Gheorghe Vișata", in Bucharest
  - 30th Guards Brigade "Mihai Viteazul", in Bucharest
    - 1st Ceremonies, Military Honors and Intervention Battalion
      - 120mm Mortars and Salvo Battery
    - 2nd Ceremonies, Military Honors and Intervention Battalion
    - Military Police Battalion
    - Special Objectives Guard Battalion
    - Combat Support Company
    - Logistic Support Company
    - Mixed Anti-Armor Platoon
    - Drill-Team Detachment
  - 84th Maintenance and Reception Center, in Bucharest
    - 85th Military Equipment Maintenance Section "Tutova", in Bârlad
  - 2nd Logistics Base "Valahia", in Ploiești
    - 22nd Transport Battalion "Dâmbovița", in Târgoviște
    - 102nd Maintenance Center "Bucov", in Bucov
    - 214th Support Company
    - 238th Quartermaster Depot "Jiul", in Craiova
    - 147th Mixed Depot in Ion Luca Caragiale
    - 129th Technical Materiel Depot "Chindia", in Târgoviște
    - 21st Troop Quartering and Barracks Administration Center "Anghel Saligny" in Bucharest
    - 116th Military Equipment Maintenance Section in Craiova
    - 185th Military Equipment Maintenance Section in Caransebeș
  - 500th Support Battalion "General de divizie Gheorghe Rusescu", in Bucharest

=== 1st Maneuver Support Brigade "Argedava" ===
- 1st Maneuver Support Brigade "Argedava" HQ, in Bucharest
  - 1st CIMIC Battalion "General de corp de armată Ștefan Holban", in Bucharest
  - 49th CBRN Battalion "Argeș", in Pitești
  - 265th Military Police Battalion "Tudor Vladimirescu", in Bucharest (Wolf Armoured Vehicle and Otokar Cobra II)
  - 635th Anti-aircraft Defence Battalion "Precista", in Negoiești (KP-SAM Chiron)
  - 117th Logistic Support Battalion "Colonel Alexandru Polyzu", in Bucharest
  - 112th Engineer Company
  - 118th Reconnaissance Company (Otokar Cobra II)
  - 120th Support Company
  - 370th Communications and Information Technology Company
  - 377th CBRN Defence Company

=== 18th ISR Brigade "Decebal" ===
- 18th ISR Brigade "Decebal" HQ, in Timișoara
  - 26th Mountain Reconnaissance Surveillance Battalion "Avram Iancu", in Brad (Otokar Cobra II)
  - 32nd Reconnaissance Surveillance Battalion "Mircea", in Timișoara
  - 313th Deep Reconnaissance Battalion "Burebista", in Clinceni
  - 495th Paratrooper Battalion "Căpitan Ștefan Soverth", in Clinceni
  - 184th Sensors and Anti-aircraft Defence Battalion "Timiș", in Timișoara (Bayraktar TB2 UCAV; will be equipped with Watchkeeper X UAV)
  - 185th Logistic Support Battalion "Mureș", in Timisoara
  - 189th Reconnaissance Company

=== 8th Tactical Operational Missile Brigade "Alexandru Ioan Cuza" ===
- 8th Tactical Operational Missile Brigade "Alexandru Ioan Cuza" HQ, in Focșani
  - 81st Tactical Operational Missile Battalion "Maior Gheorghe Șonțu", in Focșani (M142 HIMARS multiple rocket launchers)
  - 83rd Tactical Operational Missile Battalion "Bogdan I", in Bârlad (M142 HIMARS multiple rocket launchers)
  - 96th Tactical Operational Missile Battalion "Mircea Voievod", in Ploiești (M142 HIMARS multiple rocket launchers)
  - 84th Support Battalion "Mărăști", in Focșani (AN/TPQ-53 Quick Reaction Capability Radar)
  - 85th Logistic Support Battalion "General Mihail Cerchez", in Bârlad

=== 10th Engineer Brigade "Dunărea de Jos" ===
- 10th Engineer Brigade "Dunărea de Jos" HQ, in Brăila
  - 2nd Explosive Ordnance Disposal (EOD) Group, in Bucharest (Cougar JERRV and CALIBER T5)
  - 5th Explosive Ordnance Disposal (EOD) Group, in Brăila (Foster-Miller TALON)
  - Multinational Engineer Battalion "Tisa"
    - 52nd Engineer Battalion "Tisa", in Satu Mare
  - 72nd Engineer Battalion "General Constantin Savu", in Brăila (Bridging)
  - 96th Engineer Battalion "Cetatea București", in Bucharest (Bridging)
  - 136th Engineer Battalion "Apulum", in Alba Iulia (Bridging)
  - River Crossing Battalion "Danubius", in Brăila
  - 110th Logistic Support Battalion "Mareșal Constantin Prezan", in Brăila
  - 102nd Reconnaissance Company
  - 106th Support Company

=== 2nd Infantry Division "Getica" ===
- 2nd Infantry Division "Getica" HQ, in Buzău
  - 3rd Logistics Base "Zargidava", in Roman
    - 43rd Transport Battalion "Roman I Mușat", in Roman
    - 83rd Maintenance Center "Est", in Roman
    - 311th Support Company
    - 164th Quartermaster Depot "Moldavia" in Hemeiuș
    - 154th Armament and Ammunition Depot "Prahova" in Păulești
    - 33rd Technical Materiel Depot "Moldova" in Botoșani
    - 47th Troop Quartering and Barracks Administration Center "Siret" in Iași
    - 101st Fuel-Lubricants Depot "Vrâncioaia", in Golești
    - 168th Military Equipment Maintenance Section, in Constanța
    - 229th Military Equipment Maintenance Section, in Brașov
    - 469th Military Equipment Maintenance Section, in Focșani
  - 52nd Artillery Regiment "General Alexandru Tell", in Bârlad
    - 2× Multiple Rocket Launcher Battalions (LAROM multiple rocket launchers and Otokar Cobra II)
  - 53rd Anti-aircraft Missile Regiment "Tropaeum Traiani", in Medgidia
    - 1st Anti-aircraft Missile Battalion (MIM-23 Hawk surface-to-air missile systems; will be equipped with Oerlikon C-RAM systems)
    - C-UAS Detachment (Merops)
    - Air Defence unit (currently being formed) in Galați
  - 61st Anti-aircraft Missile Regiment "Pelendava", in Craiova (MIM-23 Hawk and KP-SAM Chiron; will be equipped with two Oerlikon C-RAM systems)
  - 528th Intelligence, Surveillance and Reconnaissance (ISR) Regiment "Vlad Țepeș", in Brăila
    - 2× Reconnaissance Surveillance Companies (Otokar Cobra II)
    - Deep Reconnaissance Company
    - Electronic Warfare Company (SILENTA 6001 portable drone jammer; will be equipped with ReDrone C-UAS)
    - Unmanned Aerial Vehicles Company (AeroVironment RQ-11 Raven)
    - Support Company
    - General Staff and Service Company
  - 3rd Engineer Battalion "General Constantin Poenaru", in Mărăcineni
  - 47th Communication and Informatics Battalion (CIS) "General Nicolae Petrescu", in Buzău
  - 113th Anti-Tank Artillery Battalion "Bărăganul", in Slobozia (Spike-LR and SILENTA 6001 portable drone jammer)
  - 200th Support Battalion "Istrița", in Buzău
  - 202nd CBRN Battalion "General Gheorghe Teleman", in Huși
  - 4th Explosive Ordnance Disposal (EOD) Group, in Mărăcineni (Cougar JERRV and Foster-Miller TALON)

==== 9th Mechanized Brigade "Mărășești" ====
- 9th Mechanized Brigade "Mărășești" HQ, in Constanța (part of SEEBRIG)
  - 114th Tank Battalion "Petru Cercel", in Târgoviște (TR-85 main battle tanks)
  - 912th Tank Battalion "Scythia Minor", in Murfatlar (TR-85 main battle tanks)
  - 341st Infantry Battalion "Constanța", in Topraisar
  - 911th Infantry Battalion "Capidava", in Medgidia (Otokar Cobra II)
  - 345th Artillery Battalion "Tomis", in Medgidia
  - 348th Anti-aircraft Defence Battalion "Dobrogea", in Murfatlar (Flakpanzer Gepard and KP-SAM Chiron)
  - 168th Logistic Support Battalion "Pontus Euxinus", in Constanța
  - 349th Reconnaissance Company
  - 353rd Combat Engineer Company
  - 919th Communications and Information Technology Company
  - 921st Military Police Company
  - CBRN Defence Company
  - Support Company

==== 15th Mechanized Brigade "Podu Înalt" ====
- 15th Mechanized Brigade "Podu Înalt" HQ, in Iași
  - 631st Tank Battalion "Oituz", in Bacău (TR-85 main battle tanks)
  - 814th Tank Battalion "Mihai Vodă", in Turda (TR-85 main battle tanks and Otokar Cobra II)
  - 151st Infantry Battalion "Războieni", in Iași (Otokar Cobra II and Quantum Systems Vector)
  - 634th Infantry Battalion "Mareșal Jósef Piłsudski", in Piatra Neamț (Otokar Cobra II)
  - 335th Artillery Battalion "Alexandru cel Bun", in Botoșani (Otokar Cobra II)
  - 3rd Anti-aircraft Defence Battalion "Potaissa", in Turda (Flakpanzer Gepard and KP-SAM Chiron)
  - 198th Logistic Support Battalion "Prut", in Iași
  - 159th Reconnaissance Company (Otokar Cobra II)
  - 160th Communications and Information Technology Company
  - 161st Military Police Company
  - 162nd CBRN Defence Company
  - 163rd Engineer Company
  - 199th Support Company

==== 282nd Armored Brigade "Unirea Principatelor" ====
- 282nd Armored Brigade "Unirea Principatelor" HQ, in Focșani
  - 2nd Mechanized Infantry Battalion "Călugăreni", in Bucharest (MLI-84M1 "Jderul" IFV and Otokar Cobra II)
  - 280th Mechanized Infantry Battalion "Căpitan Valter Mărăcineanu", in Focșani (MLI-84M1 "Jderul" infantry fighting vehicles)
  - 284th Tank Battalion "Cuza Vodă" ("Cavalerii Negri"), in Galați (TR-85M1 "Bizonul" main battle tanks; will be replaced with M1A2R Abrams main battle tanks in 2026)
  - 300th Mechanized Infantry Battalion "Sfântul Andrei", in Galați (MLI-84M1 "Jderul" infantry fighting vehicles)
  - 285th Artillery Battalion "Vlaicu Vodă", in Brăila (equipped with Spike-LR mounted on URO VAMTAC; will be equipped with K9 Thunder self-propelled howitzers)
  - 288th Anti-aircraft Defence Battalion "Milcov", in Focșani (Flakpanzer Gepard and KP-SAM Chiron)
  - 469th Logistic Support Battalion "Putna", in Focșani
  - 281st Support Battalion "General Arthur Văitoianu", in Focșani
    - 289th Reconnaissance Company (Otokar Cobra II and PPE PGSR-3i "Beagle")
    - 290th Communications and Information Technology Company
    - 291st Support Company
    - 292nd CBRN Defence Company
    - 293rd Engineer Company
    - 294th Military Police Company

=== 4th Infantry Division "Gemina" ===
- 4th Infantry Division "Gemina" HQ, in Cluj-Napoca
  - 4th Logistics Base "Transilvania", in Dej
    - 41st Transport Battalion "Bobâlna", in Dej
    - 88th Maintenance Center "Ardealul", in Cluj-Napoca
    - 411th Support Company
    - 241st Quartermaster Depot "General Mircea Mănescu", in Cluj-Napoca
    - 46th Troop Quartering and Barracks Administration Center in Cluj-Napoca
    - 194th Armament and Ammunition Depot "Valea Prodăii", in Jucu
    - 75th Technical Materiel Depot "Liviu Rebreanu" in Lunca de Jos
  - 69th Artillery Regiment "Silvania", in Șimleu Silvaniei
    - 7th Multiple Rocket Launcher Battalion "General Vasile Danacu", in Florești (APRA-40 multiple rocket launchers)
    - Multiple Rocket Launcher Battalion, in Șimleu Silvaniei (LAROM multiple rocket launchers)
    - Support Battalion, in Șimleu Silvaniei
  - 50th Anti-aircraft Missile Regiment "Andrei Mureșianu", in Florești (KP-SAM Chiron, CA-94 and CA-95)
    - 1st Anti-aircraft Missile Battalion
    - 2nd Anti-aircraft Missile Battalion
  - 317th Intelligence, Surveillance and Reconnaissance (ISR) Regiment "Vlădeasa", in Cluj-Napoca
    - 2× Reconnaissance Surveillance Companies (Otokar Cobra II)
    - Deep Reconnaissance Company
    - Electronic Warfare Company (will be equipped with ReDrone C-UAS)
    - Unmanned Aerial Vehicles Company (AeroVironment RQ-11 Raven)
    - Support Company
    - General Staff and Service Company
  - 53rd Engineer Battalion "Scorilo", in Deva
  - 3rd Explosive Ordnance Disposal (EOD) Group, in Bistrița (Foster-Miller TALON)
  - 55th Communication and Informatics Battalion (CIS) "Napoca", in Cluj-Napoca
  - 72nd CBRN Battalion "Negru Vodă"', in Sighișoara
  - 691st Anti-Tank Artillery Battalion "General Ion Dragalina", in Zalău (Spike-LR)
  - 400th Support Battalion "Feleacu", in Cluj-Napoca

==== 2nd Mountain Troops Brigade "Sarmizegetusa" ====
- 2nd Mountain Troops Brigade "Sarmizegetusa" HQ, in Brașov (affiliated with NRDC-GR)
  - 21st Mountain Troops Battalion "General Leonard Mociulschi", in Predeal (Otokar Cobra II)
  - 30th Mountain Troops Battalion "Dragoslavele", in Câmpulung (Otokar Cobra II)
  - 33rd Mountain Troops Battalion "Posada", in Curtea de Argeș (Otokar Cobra II)
  - 206th Artillery Battalion "General Mihail Lăcătușu", in Ghimbav
  - 228th Anti-aircraft Defence Battalion "Piatra Craiului", in Brașov (Oerlikon GDF-003 AA guns and KP-SAM Chiron)
  - 229th Logistic Support Battalion "Cumidava", in Brașov
  - 206th Reconnaissance Company (Otokar Cobra II)
  - 230th Support Company
  - 231st Military Police Company
  - 249th Communications and Information Technology Company
  - 363rd Engineer Company
  - 391st CBRN Defence Company

==== 61st Mountain Troops Brigade "Virgil Bădulescu" ====
- 61st Mountain Troops Brigade "Virgil Bădulescu" HQ, in Miercurea Ciuc
  - 17th Mountain Troops Battalion "Dragoș Vodă", in Vatra Dornei (Otokar Cobra II)
  - 22nd Mountain Troops Battalion "Cireșoaia", in Sfântu Gheorghe (Otokar Cobra II)
  - 24th Mountain Troops Battalion "General Gheorghe Avramescu", in Miercurea Ciuc (Otokar Cobra II)
  - 385th Artillery Battalion "Iancu de Hunedoara", in Odorheiu Secuiesc
  - 468th Anti-aircraft Defence Battalion "Trotuș", in Lunca de Sus
  - 435th Logistic Support Battalion "Ciuc", in Miercurea Ciuc
  - 415th CBRN Defence Company
  - 429th Reconnaissance Company
  - 440th Support Company
  - 444th Engineer Company
  - Communications and Information Technology Company
  - Hippo Company (Pack Animal), in Sfântu Gheorghe
  - Military Police Company

==== 81st Mechanized Brigade "General Grigore Bălan" ====
- 81st Mechanized Brigade "General Grigore Bălan" HQ, in Bistrița (aligned with the German Army's Rapid Forces Division)
  - Joint Peacekeeping Battalion
    - 191st Infantry Battalion "Colonel Radu Golescu", in Arad (Piranha V and Otokar Cobra II)
  - 811th Infantry Battalion "Dej", in Dej (Piranha V and Otokar Cobra II)
  - 812th Infantry Battalion "Bistrița", in Bistrița (Piranha V and Otokar Cobra II)
  - 813th Infantry Battalion "Maramureș", in Baia Mare (Piranha V)
  - 817th Artillery Battalion "Petru Rareș", in Prundu Bârgăului (will be equipped with K9 Thunder self-propelled howitzers)
  - 55th Anti-aircraft Defence Battalion "Someș", in Dej (KP-SAM Chiron)
  - 405th Logistic Support Battalion "Năsăud", in Bistrița
  - 815th Support Battalion "Rodna", in Bistrița
    - 361st Communications and Information Technology Company
    - 365th Reconnaissance Company (PPE PGSR-3i "Beagle")
    - 383rd CBRN Defence Company
    - 420th Support Company
    - 421st Military Police Company
    - 462nd Combat Support Engineer Company

=== Training Command ===
- Training Command HQ, in Bucharest
  - Nicolae Bălcescu Land Forces Academy, in Sibiu
    - "Perii Dăii" Training Ground
  - Land Forces Warrant Officers and NCOs Military School "Basarab I", in Pitești
    - 1st Training Battalion "Olt", in Caracal
  - National Joint Training Center "Getica", in Cincu
    - Secondary Combat Training Center in Babadag
    - Secondary Combat Training Center in Smârdan
    - Lerești CBRN Training Center
    - Plenița MOUT Training Center
    - Bucium Training Ground
    - Cârțișoara Training Ground
    - Support Company
  - Land Forces Interarm Training School "Mihai Viteazul", in Pitești
    - Maneuver Training Center "Constantin Brâncoveanu" in Făgăraș
      - 266th Military Police Battalion "Radu Negru" in Făgăraș
      - Support Company
      - Infantry Training Base in Focșani
      - Mountain Troops Training Base "Bucegi" in Predeal
      - ISR, Paratroopers and JTAC Training Center "General-maior Grigore Baștan" in Buzău
      - Tank and Vehicle Training Base in Pitești
      - Operational Medicine Training Base in Făgăraș
    - Combat Support Training Center "Panait Donici" in Râmnicu Vâlcea
      - EOD and C-IED Training Base in Râmnicu Vâlcea
        - 1st Explosive Ordnance Disposal (EOD) Group, in Râmnicu Vâlcea
      - Artillery and Missile, Simulation and Target Management Training Base "Ioan Vodă" in Sibiu
      - Engineer Training Base in Brăila
      - CBRN Defence Training Base "Muscel" in Pitești
      - Military Police Training Base in Bucharest
    - Regionally Managed Nodal Communications Center, in Pitești
- Military College "Ștefan cel Mare", in Câmpulung Moldovenesc

== NATO ==
- NATO Allied Joint Force Command Naples, in Naples
  - Headquarters Multinational Corps South-East (HQ MNC-SE), in Sibiu
    - 46th Support Regiment "General de corp de armată Alexandru Hanzu"
      - Communication and Informatics (CIS) Battalion
      - Force Protection Battalion
      - Support Battalion
    - Headquarters Multinational Division Southeast (HQ MND-SE; former 1st Infantry Division), in Bucharest
      - 45th Communication and Informatics Battalion (CIS) Battalion "Căpitan Grigore Giosanu", in Bucharest
      - 300th Support Battalion "Sarmis", in Bucharest
      - Multinational Brigade South-East (HQ MN BDE-SE; former 2nd Infantry Brigade "Rovine"), in Craiova
        - 20th Infantry Battalion "Dolj" ("Black Scorpions"), in Craiova (Piranha V wheeled infantry fighting vehicles)
        - 22nd Infantry Battalion "Romanați" ("Green Scorpions"), in Caracal (Piranha III armoured personnel carriers)
        - 24th Infantry Battalion "Ecaterina Teodoroiu" ("Gray Scorpions"), in Târgu Jiu
        - 26th Infantry Battalion "Neagoe Basarab" ("Red Scorpions"), in Craiova (Piranha V wheeled infantry fighting vehicles)
        - 325th Artillery Battalion "Alutus" ("Fire Scorpions"), in Caracal (will be equipped with K9 Thunder self-propelled howitzers)
        - 205th Air Defence Battalion "General Gheorghe Pârvulescu" ("Blue Scorpions"), in Craiova (Oerlikon GDF-003 anti-aircraft guns and KP-SAM Chiron)
        - 116th Logistic Support Battalion "Iancu Jianu" ("Golden Scorpions"), in Craiova
        - 225th Support Battalion, in Craiova
          - 211th Reconnaissance Company (Otokar Cobra II)
          - 212th Communications and Information Technology Company
          - 215th CBRN Defence Company (Piranha V CBRN)
          - 216th Combat Support Engineer Company
          - 220th Support Company
          - Military Police Company

== Geographic Distribution ==
Main locations of the Romanian Land Forces in 2026

== See also ==
- Romanian Joint Logistics Command
- Romanian Special Operations Forces Command
- General Directorate for Defense Intelligence
