= Multinational Corps Southeast =

NATO corps-level command under the Allied Joint Force Command Naples

Coordinates: 45°47′05.1″N 24°08′52.3″E

Headquarters Multinational Corps Southeast
- Comandamentul Corpului Multinațional de Sud-Est
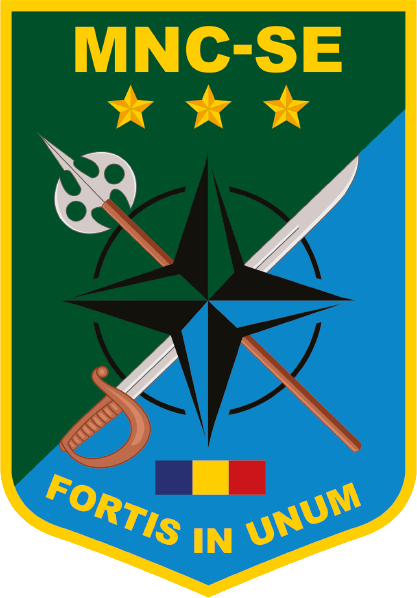
- Official emblem of the Headquarters Multinational Division Southeast
- Active: 23 July 2020 – Present
- Country: Romania
- Allegiance: NATO
- Role: Command and Control
- Size: Corps
- Part of: Allied Joint Force Command Naples
- Garrison/HQ: Sibiu
- Motto: FORTIS IN UNUM
- Website: mncse.ro

Commanders
- Commander: Lieutenant General Cristian-Daniel Dan (RO)
- Chief of Staff: Major General Constantin Nicolaescu (RO)
- Deputy Commander: Major General Ufuk Hilmi Orhan (TR)
- Deputy Chief of Staff: Brigadier General Sergiu Mungiu (RO)
- Command Senior Enlisted Leader: Chief warrant officer Eric Normand (CA)

The Headquarters Multinational Corps Southeast (HQ MNC-SE) in Sibiu, Romania, is a NATO corps-level command and control structure under the operational control of the Allied Joint Force Command Naples. With Romania as the framework nation, the Corps is integrated within NATO's military command structure.

It was formed on 23 July 2020, and is the second NATO Multinational Corps on the Eastern flank after Multinational Corps Northeast from Poland. The Corps is part of the security architecture on the Eastern flank of the Alliance in the Black Sea region. It is designed to provide corps-level command and control for NATO land operations during crises or war.

== History ==
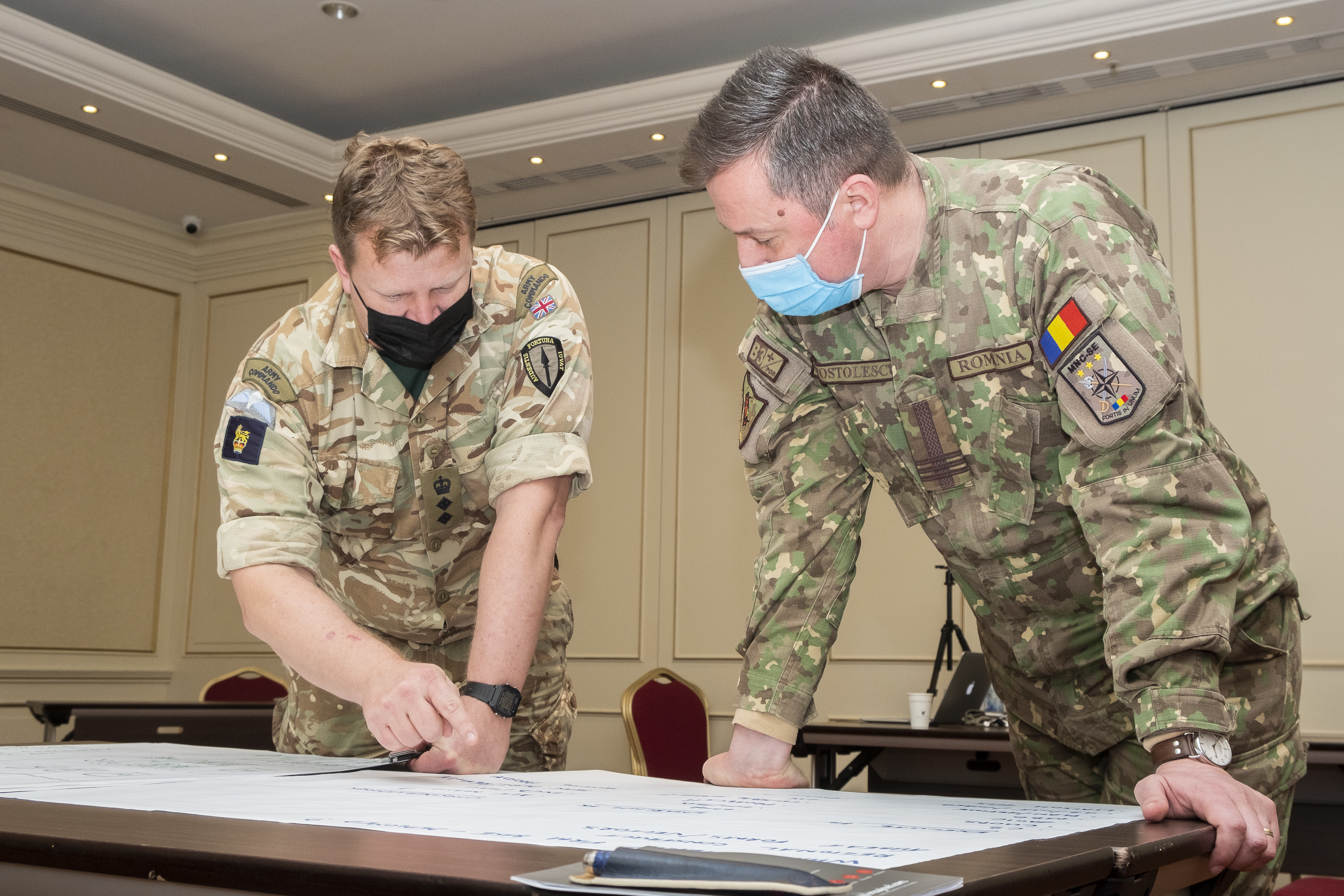
Allied Rapid Reaction Corps and Multinational Corps Southeast officers during exercise Defender Europe 21

During the 2018 Brussels summit, the President of Romania announced that Romania offered to develop a command and control capability on its territory to continue the adaptation process to the NATO Command Structure. The decision to establish a Multinational Corps Headquarters was approved by the Supreme Council of National Defence on 20 April 2020. At first, the Headquarters were to be temporarily located in Bucharest, then relocated to Sibiu. The Romanian Parliament approved the decision on 18 June 2020.

On 23 July 2020, the establishment ceremony took place at the Joint National Training Center in Cincu. During the ceremony, Major General Tomiță-Cătălin Tomescu, the units new commander, received the military colours from President Klaus Iohannis. A short notice exercise, during which 1.000 soldiers participated, was held after the ceremony. The exercise was meant to perfect the process of executing complex military actions without the usual planning stages.

The Initial operating capability was achieved in June 2021, with the conclusion of the Defender-Europe 21 command post exercise. A month later, on 1 July, the Headquarters were moved to the Sibiu Garrison. On 28 February 2022, with the retirement of Lieutenant General Tomiță-Cătălin Tomescu, the command was handed over to Major General Dragoș-Dumitru Iacob.

The Multinational Corps Southeast assumed command and control over the NATO land forces deployed to Romania and Bulgaria on 20 January 2023: Headquarters Multinational Division Southeast, NATO Force Integration Unit Bulgaria, and NATO Force Integration Unit Romania. During the event, commanders of the French-led Multinational Battle Group in Romania, the Italian-led Multinational Battle Group in Bulgaria, and the Headquarters Multinational Brigade South East, also participated.

The Corps was declared fully operational on 23 October 2023, a year earlier than planned due to the Russian invasion of Ukraine, following the conclusion of exercise Steadfast Jupiter 2023. As needed, the corps can command up to five divisions of 20,000 soldiers each.

== Symbols ==
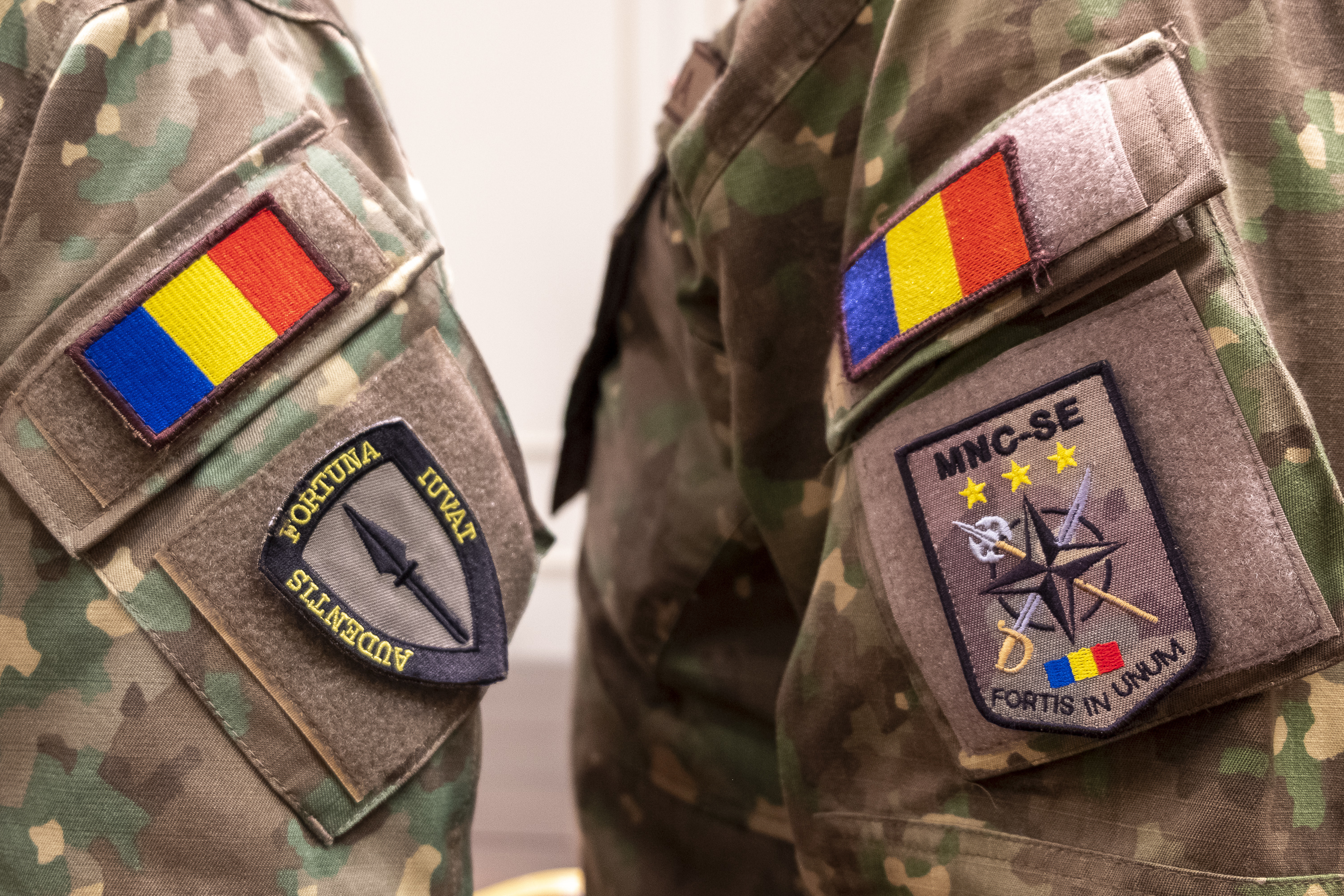
Unit patches of the Allied Rapid Reaction Corps and Multinational Corps Southeast

The heraldic emblem of the Corps has a green and blue background, symbolizing the land-oriented character of the HQ, and the core values of NATO (preserving the peace and freedom of its member states) respectively. A NATO compass rose is located in the center of the shield, behind which there are two crossed weapons: a double-headed axe, and a saber, symbolizing the sovereignty of the states and the combat power of the Corps.

The three stars indicate the hierarchical rank of the HQ, while the Romanian flag indicates the Framework Nation of the HQ. The motto of the unit, "FORTIS IN UNUM!" ("Strong Together!"), is meant to show Romania's resolution, as part of the Alliance, to ensure a safe and secure environment in the region.

== Structure ==
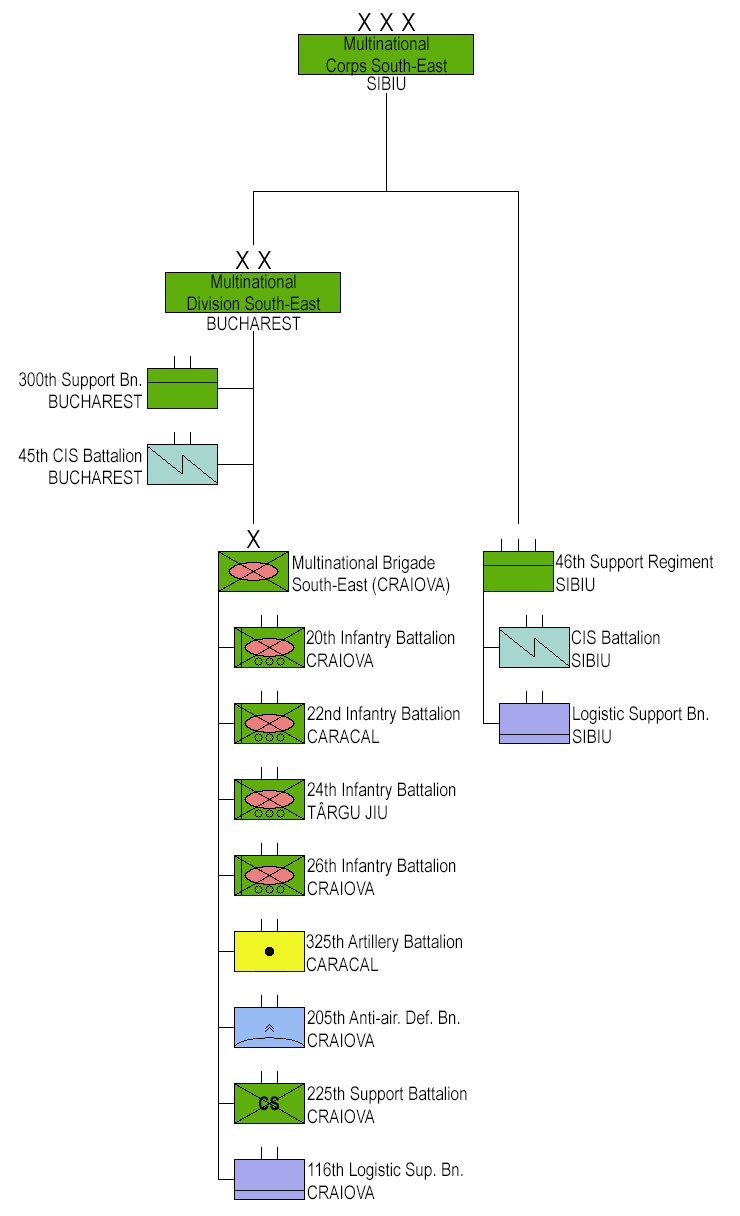
The Romanian unit organization as part of MNC-SE

- Headquarters Multinational Corps Southeast, in Sibiu
  - 46th Support Regiment "General de corp de armată Alexandru Hanzu"
    - Communication and Informatics (CIS) Battalion
    - Force Protection Battalion
    - Support Battalion
  - Headquarters Multinational Division Southeast, in Bucharest
    - 45th Communications and Information Battalion "Captain Grigore Giosanu"
    - 300th Support Battalion "SARMIS"
    - French Brigade Forward Command Element
    - Multinational Battlegroup Romania
    - Multinational Battlegroup Bulgaria
    - Multinational Brigade South-East, in Craiova
  - NATO Force Integration Unit Bulgaria
  - NATO Force Integration Unit Romania

=== Contributing nations ===
As of December 2022, there were 9 troop-contributing nations to the Headquarters: Bulgaria, Canada, Czech Republic, France, Germany, Greece, Italy, Poland, and Turkey. Another 6 nations are set to join: Croatia, Hungary, North Macedonia, Portugal, Spain, and the United Kingdom.

== Commanders ==
- Lieutenant General Tomiță-Cătălin Tomescu 23 July 2020 – 28 February 2022
- Major General Dragoș-Dumitru Iacob 28 February 2022 – 15 January 2024
- Lieutenant General Cristian-Daniel Dan 15 January 2024 – present

== See also ==
- Multinational Corps Northeast
