= Multinational Division South East =

Multinational Division South East may refer to:

- Multi-National Division (South-East) (Iraq), a British-led, multi-national division responsible for security in the south east of Iraq from 2003 to 2009
- Multinational Division South East (NATO), a Romanian-led NATO Division within the NATO Force Structure, established in 2015 to cover the South East region of Europe under the operational control of Supreme Allied Commander Europe (SACEUR)
