= 1st Infantry Division (Romania) =

- Divizia 1 Infanterie
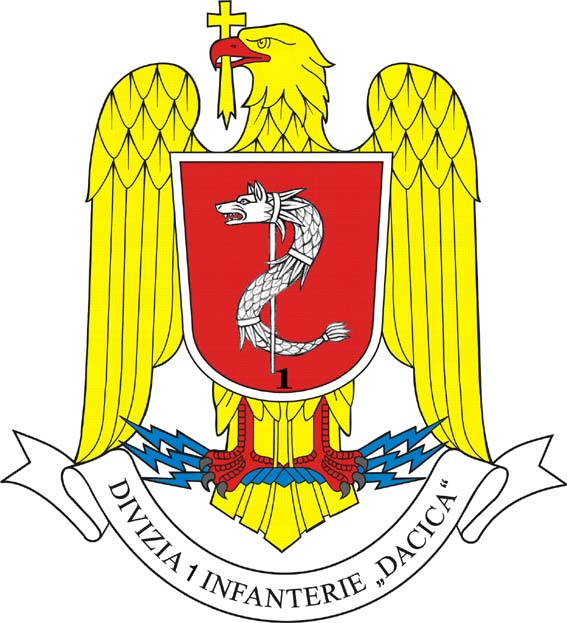
- Official emblem of the 1st Infantry Division
- Active: 15 June 2008 – 31 August 2015
- Country: Romania
- Branch: Romanian Land Forces
- Size: 3 brigades, 2 regiments, 1 logistics base, 6 auxiliary battalions
- Garrison/HQ: Bucharest
- Anniversaries: 23 April
- Engagements: Bosnia (part of EUFOR Althea); Kosovo (part of KFOR); Iraq War; War in Afghanistan

Commanders
- Notable commanders: Ioan Culcer; Eremia Grigorescu; Petre Dumitrescu

The 1st Infantry Division Dacica was one of the major units of the Romanian Land Forces, with its headquarters located in Bucharest. It was the heraldic successor of the Romanian First Army. On 31 August 2015, 1st Infantry Division headquarters disbanded, to become, three months later, the Headquarters Multinational Division Southeast of NATO's Allied Joint Force Command Naples.

== History ==
The First Army was one of the major units of the Romanian military in both World War I, partaking in such operations as the Romanian offensive in Transylvania in 1916 and the Battle of Mărășești in 1917, and World War II, seeing action on the Eastern Front, particularly after the 23 August 1944 Coup, when the First Army fought westwards alongside Soviet units in battles such as that of Debrecen, Budapest and going as far as Prague. Following the end of the war, the First Army was disbanded on 2 June 1947, with the units under its command being transferred to one of the four newly formed Military Regions. This reorganization process was applied to all Romanian armies.

On 5 April 1980, the First Army was reestablished and headquartered in Bucharest, after being assigned units previously under the control of the 2nd Army Command. The latter was relocated to Buzău. Dan Ghica-Radu was the intelligence office chief from 1998 until 2000. On the 1 August 2000, the First Army was restructured, becoming the 1st Territorial Army Corps "General Ioan Culcer", as part of a wider program to bring the Romanian military in line with NATO standards. On 15 August 2008, as a continuation of the reorganization process of the Romanian Land Forces, the 1st Territorial Army Corps "General Ioan Culcer" was reformed as the 1st Infantry Division, receiving the name "Dacica", and becoming the heraldic successor of the First Army. Units of the 1st Infantry Division were deployed (or deployed at some point) in various theaters of operation around the world, such as Bosnia, Kosovo, Iraq and Afghanistan. In 2015 the Division was removed from the Romanian Army's order of battle and was transferred to NATO command; forming the framework for what would become Headquarters Multinational Division Southeast coming under the command of NATO's Allied Joint Force Command Naples.

== Former structure ==
- 1st Infantry Division Dacica – HQ Bucharest
  - 1st Mechanized Brigade "Argedava" – headquartered at Bucharest
    - 2nd Infantry Battalion "Călugăreni" ("Desert Tigers") – Bucharest
    - 495th Infantry Battalion – Clinceni
    - 114th Tank Battalion - Târgoviște
    - 113th Artillery Battalion – Slobozia
    - 288th Anti-aircraft Artillery Battalion – Focșani
    - 117th Logistics Battalion – Ploiești
  - 2nd Infantry Brigade "Rovine" – headquartered at Craiova
    - 20th Infantry Battalion "Black Scorpions" – Craiova
    - 22nd Infantry Battalion – Craiova
    - 26th Infantry Battalion "Neagoe Basarab" ("Red Scorpions") – Craiova
    - 325th Artillery Battalion – Caracal
    - 116th Logistics Battalion "Golden Scorpions" – Craiova
    - 205th Anti-aircraft Artillery Battalion "Blue Scorpions" – Craiova
  - 2nd Mountain Troops Brigade "Sarmizegetusa" – headquartered at Brașov
    - 21st Mountain Troops Battalion – Predeal
    - 30th Mountain TroopsBattalion – Câmpulung
    - 33rd Mountain Troops Battalion – Curtea de Argeș
    - 206th Mixed Artillery Battalion – Brașov
    - 228th Anti-aircraft Missile Battalion – Brașov
    - 229th Logistic Battalion – Brașov
  - 2nd Logistics Base "Valahia" – headquartered at Târgoviște
  - 51st Mixed Artillery Regiment "General Cornel Paraniac" – headquartered at Slobozia
  - 61st Mixed Anti-aircraft Missiles Regiment "Pelendava" – headquartered at Slobozia
  - 1st "CIMIC" Battalion – headquartered at Bucharest
  - 49th CBRN Battalion "Argeș" – headquartered at Pitești
  - 96th Engineer Battalion "Joseph Kruzel"
  - 313th Reconnaissance Battalion "Burebista"
  - 45th Communications & Information Systems Battalion "Căpitan Grigore Giosanu"
  - 300th Logistic Support Battalion "Sarmis" – headquartered at Bucharest
  - other supporting units

== See also ==
- Romania during World War I
- Romania during World War II
- Battle of Romania (1944)
