= 26th Infantry Battalion (Romania) =

Romanian military unit

26th Infantry Battalion "Neagoe Basarab"
- Batalionul 26 Infanterie "Neagoe Basarab"
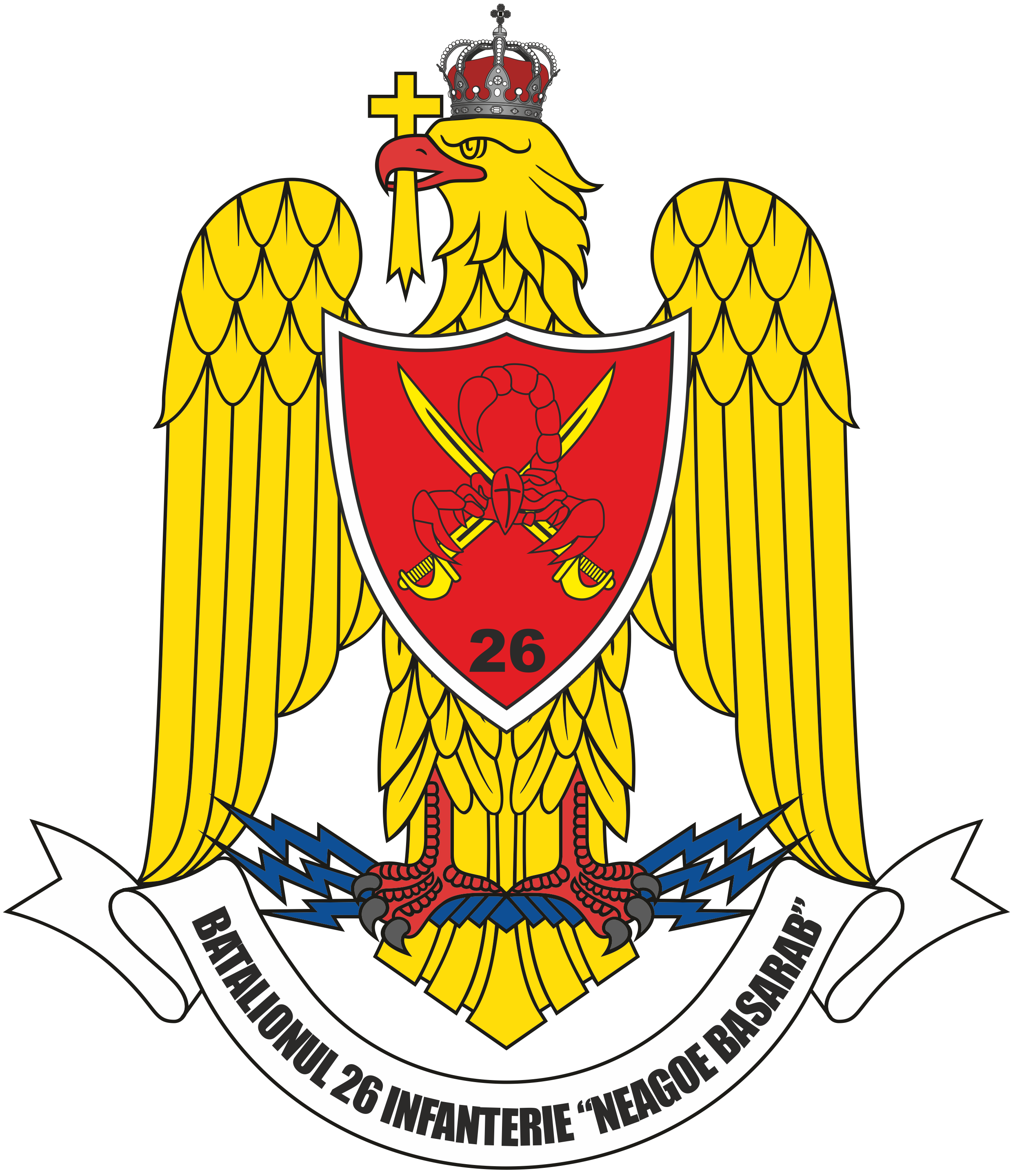
- Insignia of the 26th Infantry Battalion "Neagoe Basarab"
- Active: 1 April 1880–September 1994 (as the 26th Regiment); September 1994–present (as the 26th Battalion)
- Country: Romania
- Branch: Romanian Land Forces
- Part of: Multinational Brigade South-East
- Garrison/HQ: Craiova
- Nickname: Red Scorpions (Scorpionii Roșii)
- Motto: SEMPER GLORIOSI
- Anniversaries: 1 April
- Engagements: First World War; Romanian campaign; Second World War; Eastern Front; Angola (UNAVEM III); Bosnia and Herzegovina (SFOR); Kosovo (KFOR); War in Afghanistan; Operation Enduring Freedom; Iraq War; Operation Ancient Babylon

Commanders
- Current commander: Major Marius Cuțuhan
- Notable commanders: Lieutenant colonel Nicolae Ciucă

The 26th Infantry Battalion "Neagoe Basarab" (Romanian: Batalionul 26 Infanterie "Neagoe Basarab"), also known as the Red Scorpions (Romanian: Scorpionii Roșii), is an infantry battalion of the Romanian Land Forces based in Craiova. It was established in 1880 as the 26th Dorobanți Regiment, then transformed into the present-day 26th Infantry Battalion in 1994. It is part of Romania's Multinational Brigade South-East. The 26th Infantry Battalion got its nickname, "Red Scorpions", from allied troops of the United States in 1996 during its mission in Angola, as they encountered many scorpions there.

One of its notable commanders was Nicolae Ciucă, who later served as Chief of the Romanian General Staff, Minister of National Defence of Romania, Prime Minister of Romania and president of the National Liberal Party.

== History ==
=== 26th Dorobanți Regiment ===
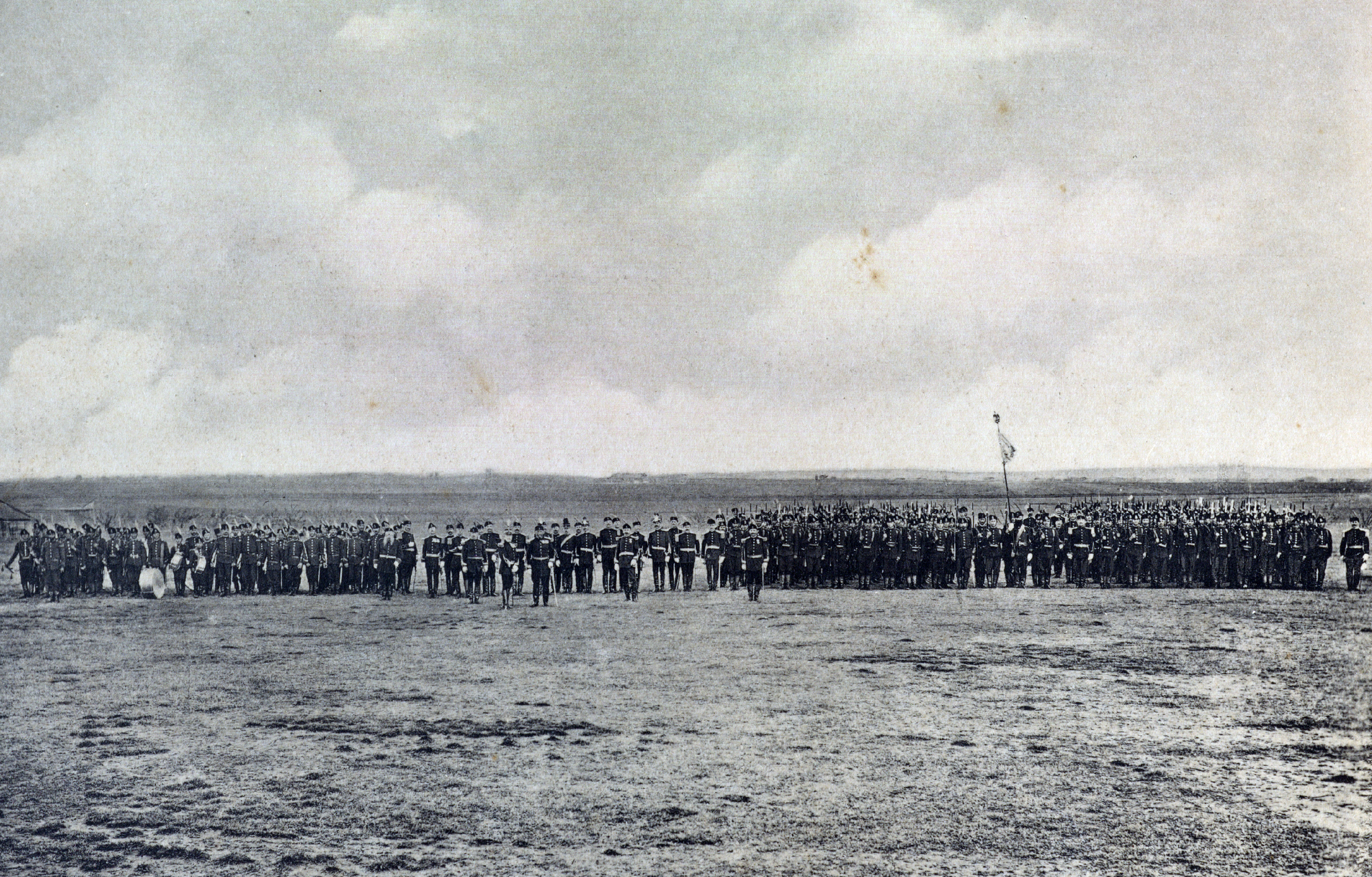
Soldiers and officers of the 26th Regiment in 1902

The 26th Infantry Battalion was established as the 26th Dorobanți Regiment (Regimentul 26 Dorobanți) on 1 April 1880 by transforming the former 2nd Dorobanți Battalion "Fălciu" of the 12th Dorobanți Regiment from Bârlad. The regiment was placed under the 4th Division and its initial garrison was located in Huși. With the reorganization of 1891, the 26th Infantry Regiment (Note: Note, like all Dorobanți regiments after 1891, the 26th appeared as both the 26th Infantry Regiment and 26th Dorobanți Regiment.) received the honorific name "Rovine" for the bravery that its soldiers displayed during the War of Independence. At the same time, its garrison was moved to Craiova.

==== World War I ====
By 1916, the regiment was part of the 3rd Infantry Brigade in the 2nd Infantry Division. On Romania's entry into the war, the 26th Infantry Regiment was assigned to the Jiu Group under the 11th Infantry Division of the First Army. With this organization, it participated in the battles on the Jiu Valley, occupying the Petroșani area in August 1916. Following the First Battle of the Jiu Valley in October, the Romanian 11th Infantry Division was redeployed to the Pitești area. The regiment continued to fight until its forces were scattered in the battle of "Cota 1001" (Note: Peak of Măgura Odobeștilor.) on 15 February 1917.

During the fighting from August 1916 to February 1917, the 26th Regiment suffered heavy casualties, with only 400 soldiers remaining of the original 3000. After undergoing reorganization and restoring its combat capacity, at the same time being reinforced with Transylvanian volunteers from the Volunteer Corps, the regiment was deployed in the Zăbrăuți–Fitionești sector on the Mărășești front area and participated in the 1917 summer campaign. In the autumn of 1918, it returned to its garrison in Craiova. For its combat feats during the First World War, the regiment was awarded the Order of Michael the Brave on 4 July 1937.

==== World War II ====
Seven years of service badge of the 26th Regiment

In 1941, at the start of Operation Barbarossa, the 26th Dorobanți Regiment was part of the 2nd Infantry Division. As such, it participated in fighting on the Eastern Front. After the 1941 campaign, it was partially reorganized in Rostov. In July 1942, the 2nd Infantry Division intervened in the battles on the Don bend holding the bridgehead at Tsimlyanskaya until 31 July. Afterwards, the division went on a counterattack to secure the flank of the German 29th Motorized Infantry Division.

In the First Jassy–Kishinev offensive, the 26th Infantry Regiment fought alongside German troops and other Romanian troops near the Roznovanu Palace in Iași, attempting to push the Soviet troops back over the Jijia river. After the 23 August 1944 coup, the regiment retreated from the front line and by September it reorganized itself in Slatina. The regiment continued fighting in Hungary in the Battle of Debrecen, and in the Siege of Budapest as part of the 2nd Infantry Division, 1st Army in the 2nd Ukrainian Front.

Between December 1944 and May 1945, the 26th Regiment fought in Czechoslovakia and took part in the liberation of Kojetín and Kroměříž. Though Victory was declared on 8 May 1945, the regiment remained fighting against Schutzstaffel units which were refusing to surrender in the Obědkovice area until 12 May 1945. The Romanian troops began returning home in June 1945.

=== 26th Infantry Battalion ===
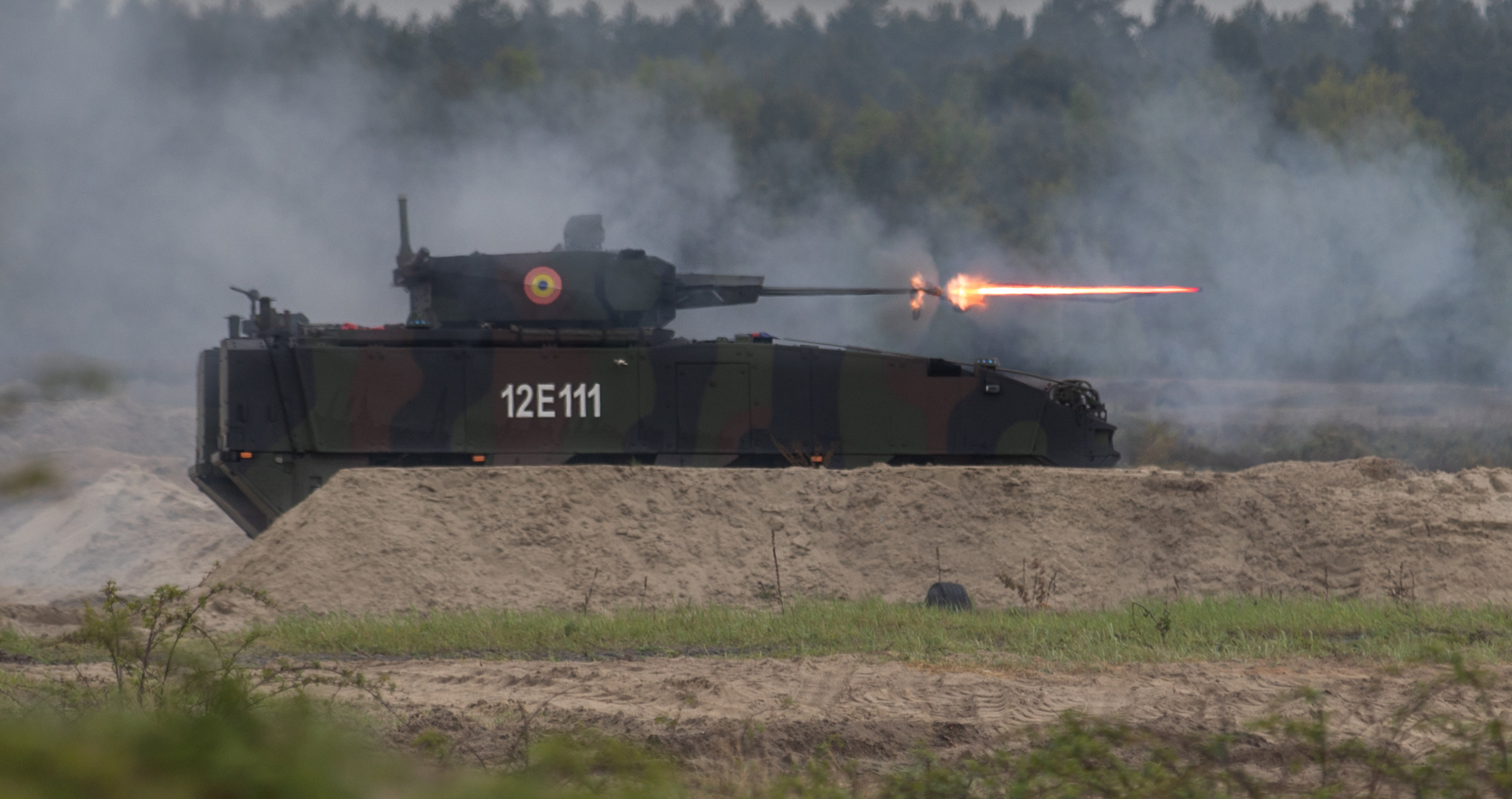
26th Infantry Battalion Piranha V at a live fire exercise in Nowa Dęba, Poland

After World War II, the 26th Regiment was reorganized into the 26th Mechanized Infantry Regiment "Rovine" in 1959, receiving the designation of Military Unit 01047, which is still kept in the present. On the reorganization and restructuring of the Romanian Army in the 1990s, the 26th Mechanized Regiment was transformed into the 26th Infantry Battalion and received the honorific name "Neagoe Basarab" on 15 September 1994. With Romania joining the Partnership for Peace, the battalion was included in the Forces of the Partnership for Peace and began deploying in international missions.

The battalion began participating in international missions under UN or NATO command in Angola, Bosnia and Herzegovina, Kosovo, Iraq and Afghanistan. Its tasks there were building refugee camps and weapons depots or guarding airports, military bases and roads. The first deployment happened in 1996 with the United Nations Angola Verification Mission III in Angola. The unit conducted peacekeeping operations in the Huíla Province with bases located in Lubango, Lobito, Chicuma, and N'Gove near Huambo. During this deployment, the battalion received its nickname "Red Scorpions". In the same deployment, the battalion also lost one soldier.

The first combat mission carried out by the 26th Battalion and the Romanian Army since the Second World War happened in 2002, when 405 soldiers were deployed to the Kandahar Province in Afghanistan in support of Operation Enduring Freedom, integrating with the American 82nd and 101st Airborne Divisions. Their missions included protecting the base and airport as well as conducting reconnaissance and patrolling. One of their successful scouting missions in a rugged area near the border with Pakistan, named the Pelendava mission, was recognized by the United States Central Command. While under U.S. command in Afghanistan, the "Red Scorpions" nickname became official when colonel Michael Linnington, commander of the 3rd Brigade, 101st Airborne, began using it in the operational documents. Between 2002 and 2011, six soldiers of the 26th Battalion lost their lives in the combat theatres. In 2009, the battalion received the honor of closing the Romanian military deployments to Iraq.

Since the transformation of the 2nd Infantry Brigade into the Multinational Brigade South-East in 2017, a rotational Polish Army Motorized Company of c. 230 soldiers and 47 vehicles (KTO Rosomak armored personnel carriers) is integrated into the 26th Infantry Battalion. With the reception of the first batch of Piranha V vehicles in 2020, the 26th Battalion became the first unit of the Romanian Army to be equipped with the new wheeled infantry fighting vehicles.

==== Nasiriyah ====
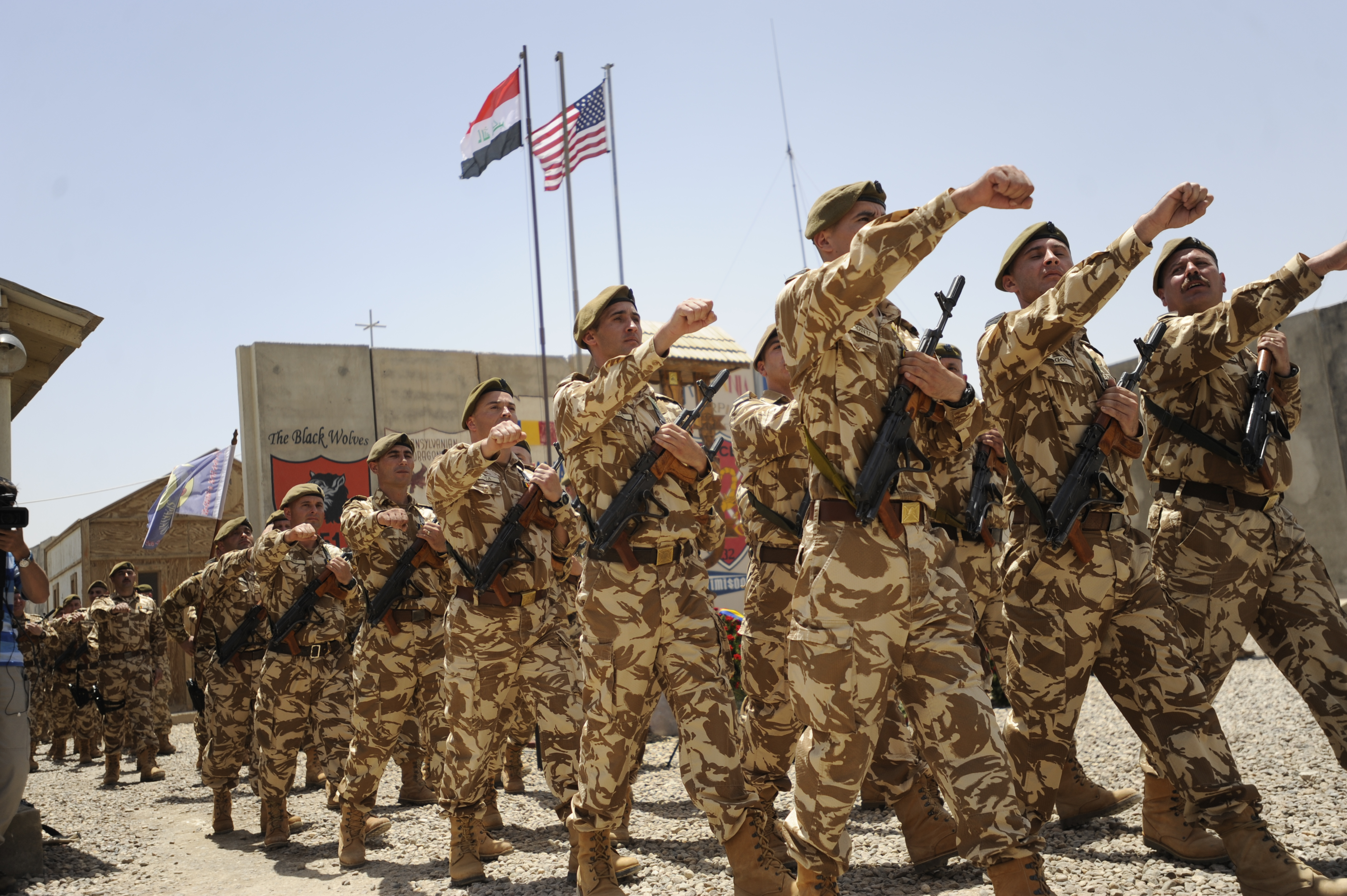
Red Scorpions at Camp Dracula on the end-of-mission ceremony in 2009

While on deployment to Iraq in 2004 as part of the Italian involvement, the Red Scorpions participated in the first military engagement of the Romanian Army since World War II. Following Operation Porta Pia and the conclusion of the First Battle for the Bridges of Nasiriyah in April 2004 which ended in an armistice, the Iraqi insurgent Mahdi Army launched another attack on the city in May 2004 seeking to regain control over the Alpha, Bravo and Charlie bridges over the Euphrates. On 14 May, the insurgents began bombarding the headquarters of the Coalition Forces in Dhi Qar at the Camp White Horse base with mortars and 122mm rockets. At the same time, the Iraqis besieged the building of the Coalition Provisional Authority in Nasiriyah.

On the night of 14/15 May, six VCC armored vehicles left the base by order of general Gian Marco Chiarini, the commander of the Ariete Brigade, to relieve the besieged Coalition building. To protect the flank of the Italian force, general Chiarini also ordered the Romanian 26th Battalion to secure the Delta bridge, later nicknamed the "Scorpions' bridge", located on the far eastern side of the city in the al-Fadliyah district thus preventing insurgent forces coming from Suq al-Shuyukh to enter Nasiriyah. Under the command of lieutenant colonel Nicolae Ciucă, 10 TABs with 70 soldiers departed for the Delta bridge. Upon getting closer to the bridge, the column was attacked with RPGs and small arms fire. In the engagement, the MEDEVAC TABC-79 was struck by an RPG-7 which destroyed both its rear tires and one of the front tires. The decision was taken to leave two TABs behind with the damaged MEDEVAC and continue the mission with the rest. Soon after the objective was reached, the Iraqis launched another attack on the column. The troops proceeded to dismount and formed a defensive perimeter between the road and the nearby railway embankment. The soldiers and armored vehicles remained in the area until the next day, in which time they also repaired the damaged TAB. Once back to base, the soldiers of the battalion were inspected and commended by general Andrew Stewart, the commander of the Multi-National Division.

The Italians had managed to break through the siege and evacuate the civilian personnel including Governor Barbara Contini from the CPA building. In the following days, Italian units cleared the remaining insurgents from the city, the Second Battle for the Bridges ending on 17 May 2004.

== Decorations ==
Pre–1994

The 26th Infantry Regiment has received the following decorations:

- Order of Michael the Brave (3rd class – 1937)

Post–1994

The 26th Infantry Battalion has received the following decorations:

- National Order of Faithful Service, Peacetime (Knight – 2017)
- National Order of Merit, Wartime (Knight – 2011; Officer – 2015)
- Order of Military Virtue (Peacetime, Knight – 2004; Wartime, Officer – 2009)

== See also ==
- Structure of the Romanian Land Forces
- Neagoe Basarab, Prince of Wallachia between 1512 and 1521

== Bibliography ==
- Dobrițoiu, Radu-Constantin (2021). Podul Scorpionilor (in Romanian). Velvet Story. ISBN 9786069524503.
- Lazar, Adrian; Stambuliu, Bogdan (2016). Military and sociopolitical badges of Romania 1859-1947. Bucharest: Galeria Numismatica.
