= Multinational Brigade South-East (Romania) =

Romanian Land Forces formation

Coordinates: 44°19′47.1″N 23°47′34.1″E

- Brigada Multinațională Sud-Est
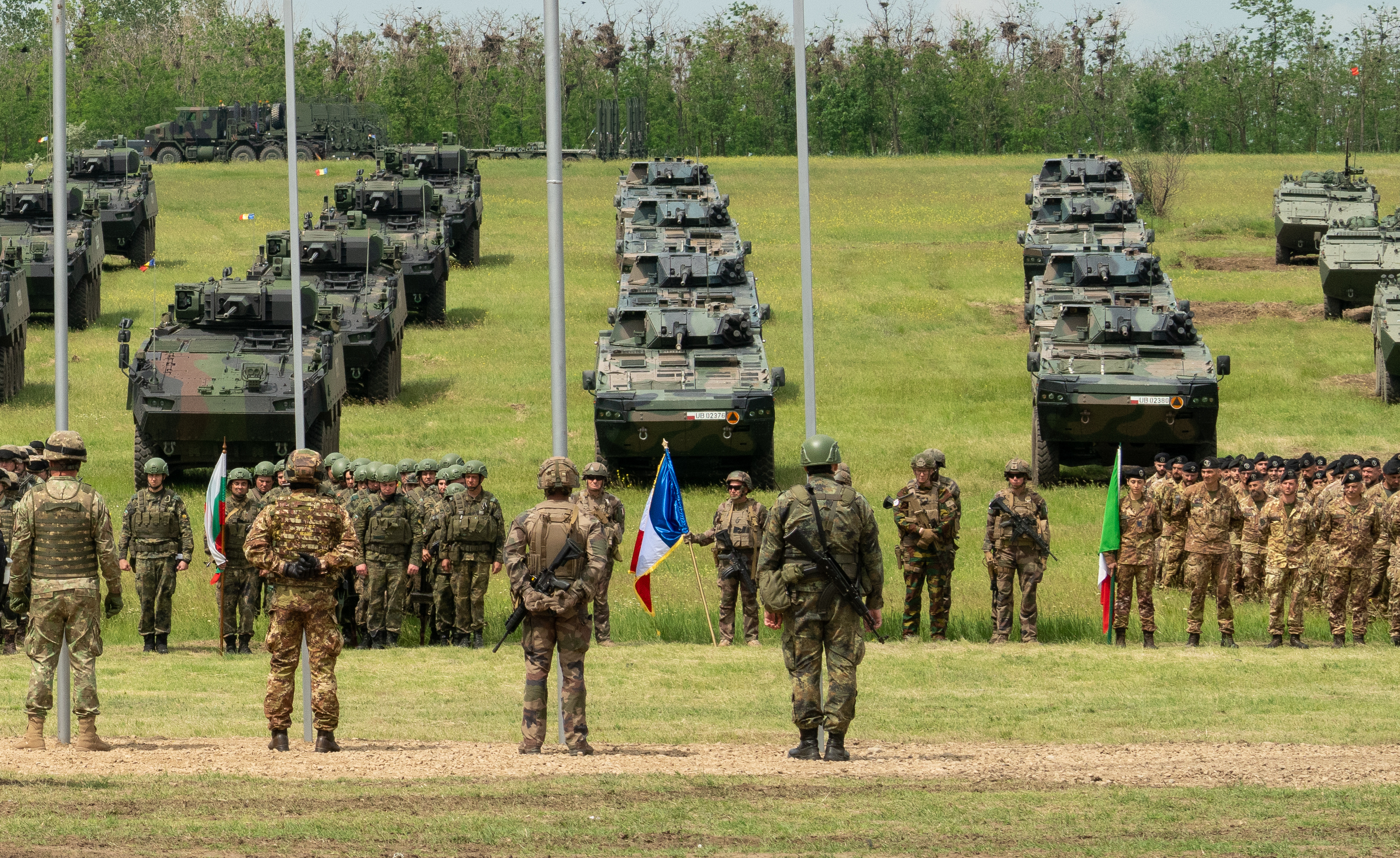
- Romanian, Polish, and Portuguese armored fighting vehicles at the Saber Guardian 2023 opening
- Active: 1883–2017 as the 2nd Infantry Brigade; 2017–present
- Country: Romania
- Allegiance: NATO
- Type: Brigade
- Size: 8 battalions
- Part of: Multinational Division Southeast
- Garrison/HQ: Craiova
- Motto: SEMPER PRIMUS
- Anniversaries: April 1st
- Engagements: First World War: Romanian Campaign; Hungarian–Romanian War; Second World War; Iraq War; War in Afghanistan

Commanders
- Current commander: Brigadier General Irinel Apostolescu

The Multinational Brigade South-East (MN BDE SE) is an infantry brigade of the Romanian Land Forces. Until April 2017 the brigade was named 2nd Infantry Brigade "Rovine", but has since become one of Romania's contributions to NATO. The "Rovine" was deployed to Afghanistan and Iraq for peacekeeping missions.

== History ==
The brigade was formed on 1 April 1883. It participated in both World Wars. In 1916, the Brigade was composed of the 1st and the 31st Infantry Regiment, and was part of the 1st Infantry Division. It took part in the Romanian Campaign of World War I, and in the Hungarian–Romanian War of 1919.

In 1970, the 2nd Infantry Brigade Craiova was formed. It was named after the Battle of Rovine, which took place in 1395. Starting from 1995, the brigade began participating in international exercises. Troops from the brigade were also deployed in international missions in Angola, Bosnia and Herzegovina, Kosovo, Iraq, and Afghanistan. During the deployment to Angola, the 26th Infantry Battalion took the nickname "Red Scorpions". During the multinational deployments, the name of the unit was registered as such by an American commander, thus becoming the first Romanian unit with an official nickname. Following the 26th Battalion example, the other battalions of the brigade also received a "scorpion" nickname.

=== Multinational Brigade ===
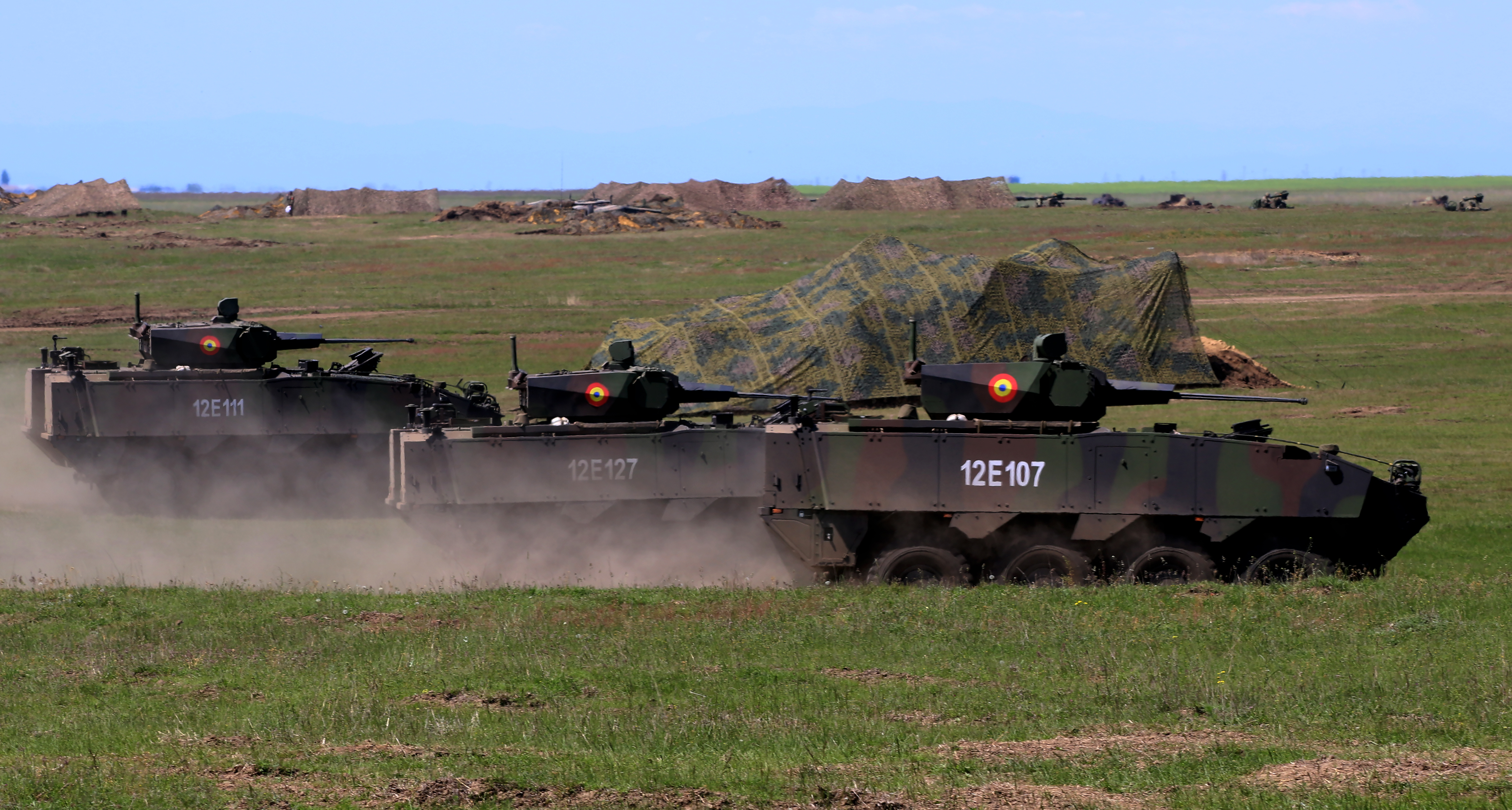
Piranha V wheeled infantry fighting vehicles during the DACIA 21 LIVEX Exercise at Smârdan

During the 2016 Warsaw summit, NATO secretary general Jens Stoltenberg announced that a Romanian Army brigade was going to be transformed into a NATO Multinational Brigade. Following a meeting of the Romanian Supreme Council of National Defence in September 2016, the President of Romania announced that the 2nd Infantry Brigade was to take the role of the multinational brigade. The Multinational Brigade was declared fully operational by the Deputy Commander of the Allied Land Command in 2018 following the evaluation exercise Scorpions Fury 2018. The brigade is currently subordinated to the Headquarters Multinational Division Southeast from Bucharest.

On 10 August 2023, structures of the Multinational Brigade participated at the establishment ceremony of the newly created 24th Infantry Battalion. The new battalion, named after Ecaterina Teodoroiu, is to be subordinated to the brigade and has its headquarters in Târgu Jiu.

== Organization ==
=== Organization in 2026 ===
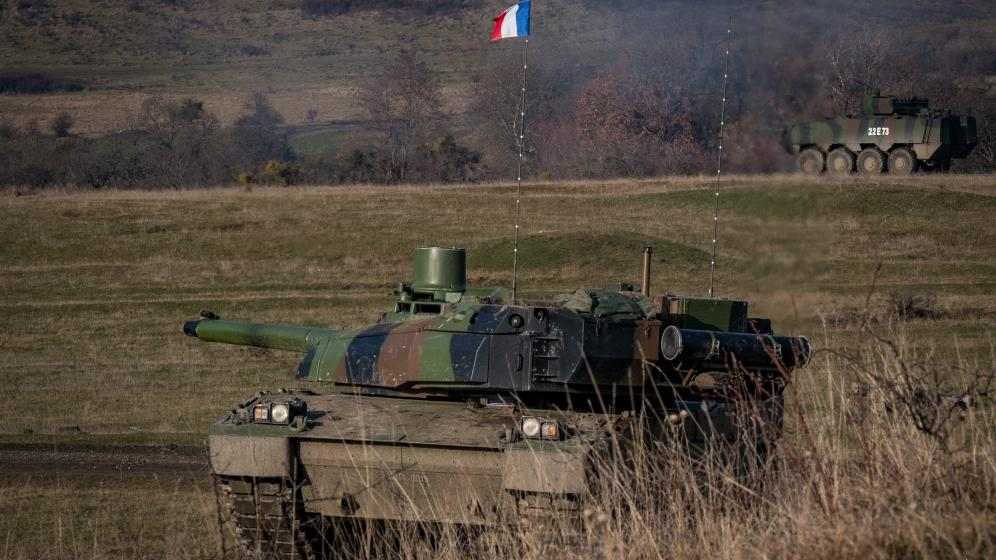
French Leclerc tank and Romanian Piranha V at the Cincu military camp

- Multinational Brigade South-East (HQ MN BDE-SE), in Craiova
  - 20th Infantry Battalion "Dolj" ("Black Scorpions"), in Craiova, with Piranha V wheeled infantry fighting vehicles
  - 22nd Infantry Battalion "Romanați" ("Green Scorpions"), in Caracal, with Piranha III armoured personnel carriers
    - Portuguese Contingent (Força Nacional Destacada - FND), in Caracal
  - 24th Infantry Battalion "Ecaterina Teodoroiu" ("Gray Scorpions"), in Târgu Jiu
  - 26th Infantry Battalion "Neagoe Basarab" ("Red Scorpions"), in Craiova, with Piranha V wheeled infantry fighting vehicles
    - Polish Motorized Company, in Craiova
  - 116th Logistic Battalion "Iancu Jianu" ("Golden Scorpions"), in Craiova
  - 205th Air Defence Battalion "General Gheorghe Pârvulescu" ("Blue Scorpions"), in Craiova, with Oerlikon GDF-003 anti-aircraft guns and KP-SAM Chiron
  - 325th Artillery Battalion "Alutus" ("Fire Scorpions"), in Caracal, will be equipped with K9 Thunder self-propelled howitzers
  - 225th Support Battalion, in Craiova
    - 211th Reconnaissance Company, with Otokar Cobra II
    - 212th Communications and Information Technology Company
    - 215th CBRN Defence Company, with Piranha V CBRN
    - 216th Combat Support Engineer Company
    - 220th Support Company
    - Military Police Company
  - Army of North Macedonia Contingent, in Caracal
