= Mission Aigle =

French-led military mission to Romania

- Mission Aigle
- Badge of Mission Aigle
- Active: 28 February 2022 – present
- Allegiance: NATO
- Type: Army
- Size: 1,500+
- Part of: NATO Enhanced Forward Presence

The Mission Aigle is a French-led military mission deployed to Romania following the activation of the Graduated Response Plans by the Supreme Allied Commander Europe as a response to the Russian Invasion of Ukraine in 2022. Following this decision, France sent troops to Romania on 28 February 2022 in order to strengthen the Alliance's deterrent and defensive posture against Russia.

== History ==
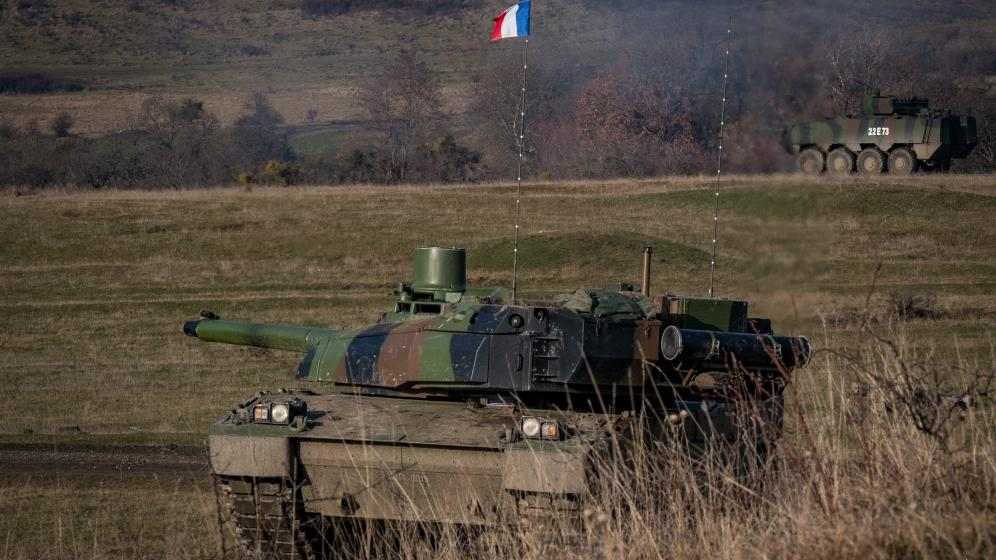
French Leclerc tank and Romanian Piranha V at the Cincu military camp

On 28 February 2022, France deployed a spearhead battalion of the rapid response force to Romania. On 1 May 2022, the multinational battalion constituted the Battle Group Forward Presence (BGFP) in Romania, with France as the lead nation. For the first time, France assumed the role of leading nation in a NATO reassurance mission. The BGFP is a multinational battalion tasked with reinforcing the operational capabilities of the deployed troops. Currently, the Multinational Battlegroup is under the command of the Multinational Division South-East based in Bucharest.

To house the battlegroup, a new military base was constructed in Cincu. The base consists of hangars, ammunition depots, as well as, auxiliary buildings for civilian purposes. The military town was constructed by a multinational detachment of engineers, and the costs were covered by France and Romania with construction materials acquired from Romania. It was reported in November that the French soldiers were living in "deplorable" conditions with insufficient food, poor hygiene, and bad heating. These reports were dismissed by the French embassy in Romania as no formal complaints regarding the conditions at the base were received. While living conditions were rudimentary during the construction works, these improved significantly once the base was completed. The soldiers have access to hot water, electricity, internet connection and live in small heated rooms in groups of three or four.

On 18 October, French Leclercs of the 7th Armored Brigade departed for Romania. The tanks arrived in Voila on 16 November. On 6 December, the tanks took part in the first live fire exercise at the Cincu Training Center during exercise Eagle Zori.

In 2025, the Multinational Battlegroup increased its size to a brigade level. Originally intended to be deployed during the Dacian Spring exercise, the 5,000 NATO soldiers of the brigade were deployed for the Dacian Fall exercise which took place between 20 October and 13 November 2025. Future plans are to further increase the size of the NATO unit to division level, with Cincu expected to host over 15,000 troops by 2027/2028.

Former badge of the mission

=== Name and symbol ===
Aigle means "Eagle" in French. It was chosen as a reference to the Romanian coat of arms. The sword evokes the immediate operational nature of the deployed force. The 4-point compass star, the symbol of NATO, recalls the framework of France's commitment in Romania. The flags illustrate the host country and the allied countries included in the multinational battalion.

== Strength ==
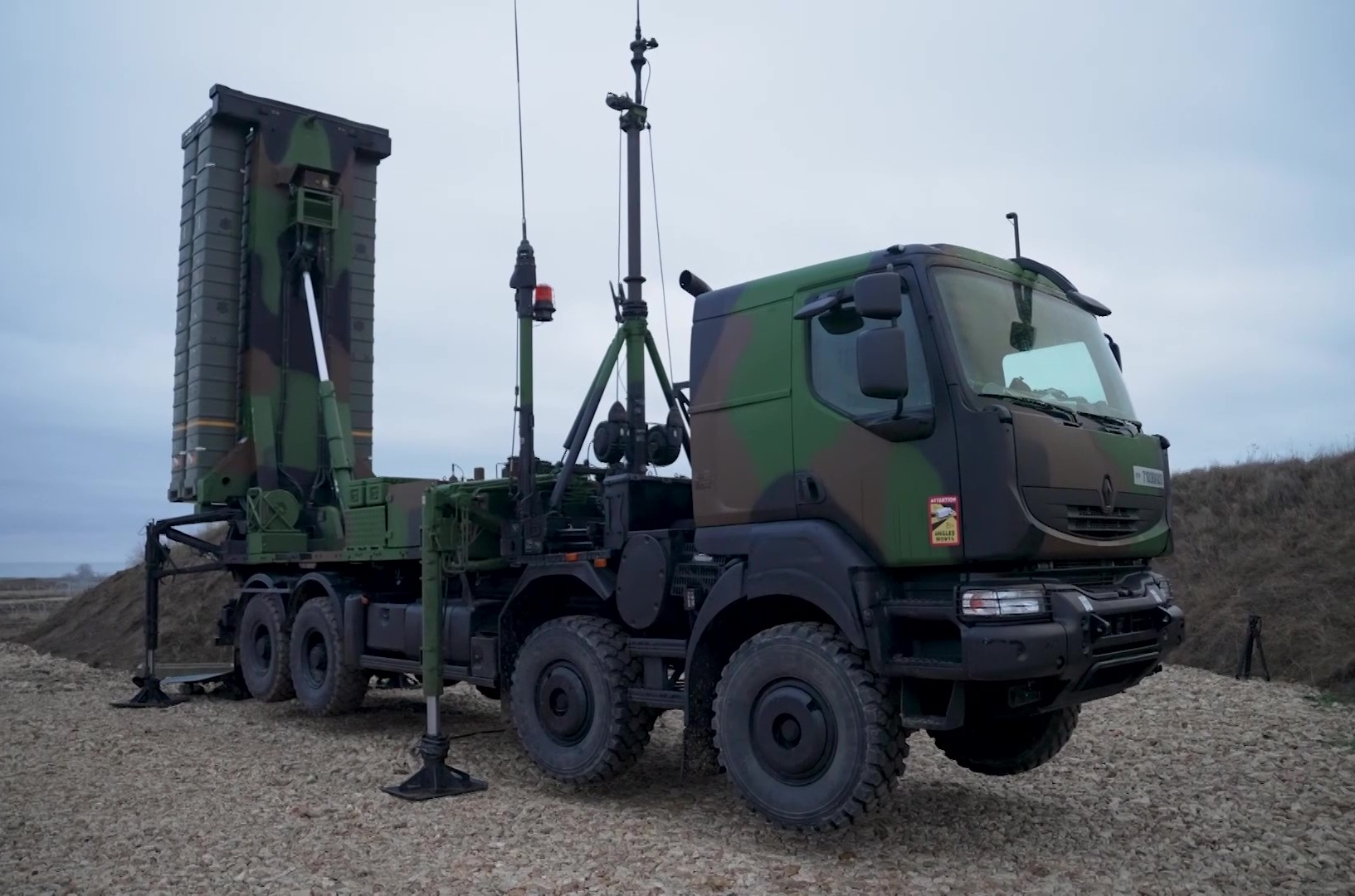
MAMBA system in Romania

As of November 2025, the multinational force in Romania is made up of more than 1,500 soldiers, organized in the following units:

- Multinational Battlegroup in Cincu and Mihail Kogalniceanu
- Medium-range surface-to-air defence detachment (Détachement sol-air moyenne portée - SAMP) MAMBA, in Capu Midia (100 soldiers)
- National support echelon (Échelon de soutien national - ESN), in Cincu and Mihail Kogalniceanu (c. 400 soldiers)
- Senior National Representative (SNR) and the Brigade Forward Command Element (BFCE) in Bucharest (c. 30 soldiers)

Participating in the mission are forces from France, Belgium and the Netherlands. From 21 March 2023, Luxembourg also joined the Aigle mission. In December 2024, Spain joined the mission with a Marine Infantry company.

=== Multinational Battlegroup ===
The NATO Forward Land Forces Battle Group "Sevastopol" consists of more than 1,500 soldiers, of which 300 Belgian, 6 Luxembourgish and 200 Spanish soldiers and is commanded by Colonel Assed Mohamed Aguid. The French troops are headquartered at Camp Général Berthelot, formerly "Cherry Hill", named in honor of General Henri Mathias Berthelot. As of November 2025, the battlegroup is equipped with the following:

Model	Number
Leclerc tank	13
VBCI	17
VBMR Griffon	6
Véhicule de l'Avant Blindé	48
Petit Véhicule Protégé	27
Véhicule Blindé Léger	36
ACMAT VT4	19
CAESAR	4
Lance Roquette Unitaire	3
120mm mortar	5
MILAN	N/A
Mistral	N/A
ATF Dingo (Belgium/Luxembourg)	N/A
Piranha III (Spain)	N/A
URO VAMTAC (Spain)	N/A
Transport trucks	50+

=== MAMBA system ===
From 6 May, at the request of the Romanian authorities and NATO, the French forces deployed the MAMBA ground-to-air defence system at the Capu Midia base. The system is composed of several interconnected modules. Each launch unit can salvo fire up to eight ASTER 30 missiles. To increase the efficiency, the system is connected and integrated via a tactical data link to the Romanian, and NATO defense systems, which command it. Following a test phase, the MAMBA system was certified and is now fully integrated in the NATO Integrated Air Missile Defence (IAMD).

== Gallery ==
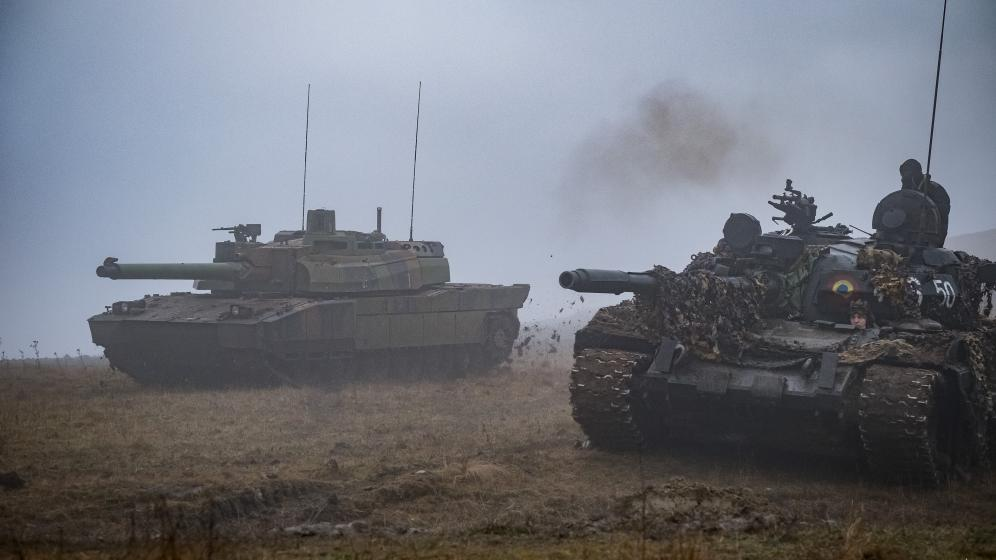
T-55 tanks of the Romanian 814th tank battalion and French Leclercs in Turda

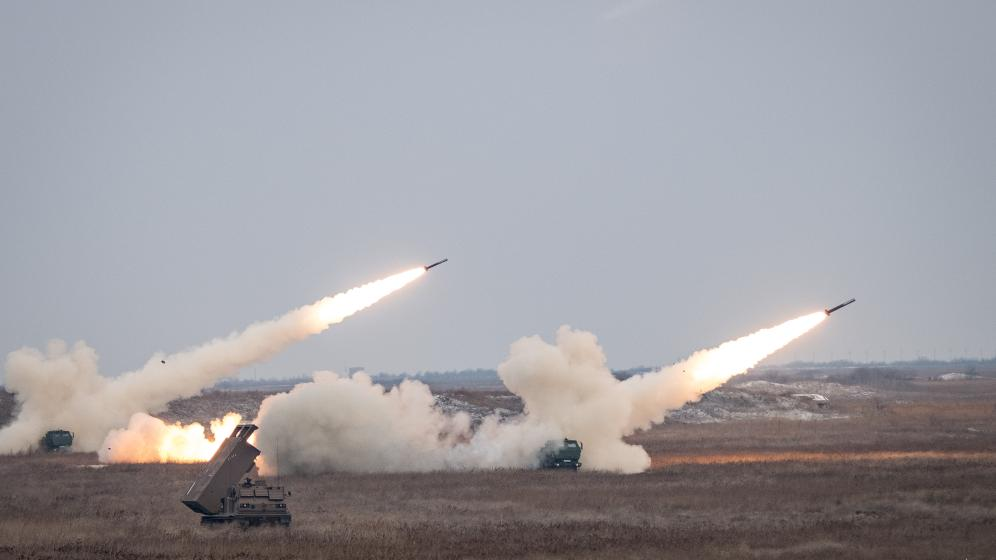
Romanian HIMARS and a French LRU firing during exercise Eagle Royal at Capu Midia

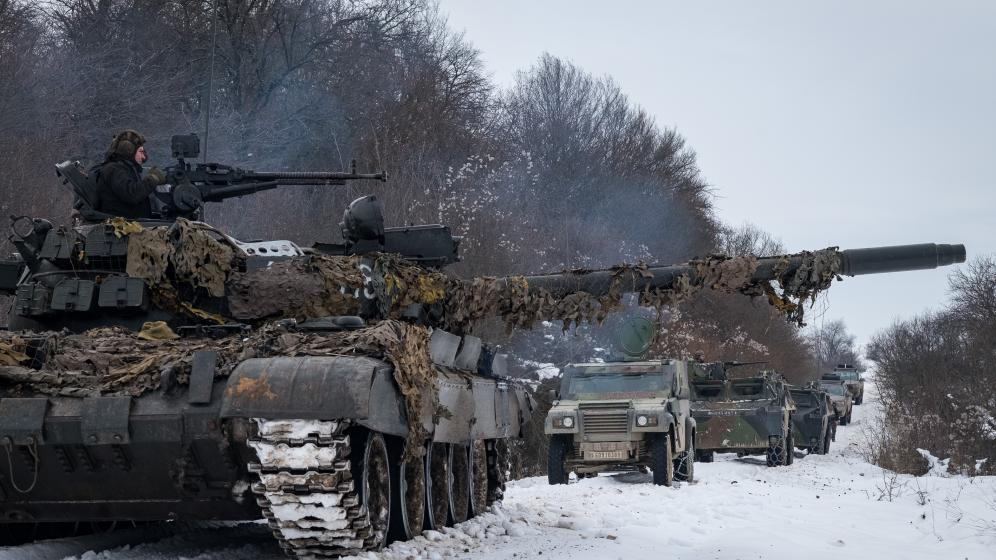
Combined training for Romanian, Portuguese and French soldiers, exercise Eagle Black

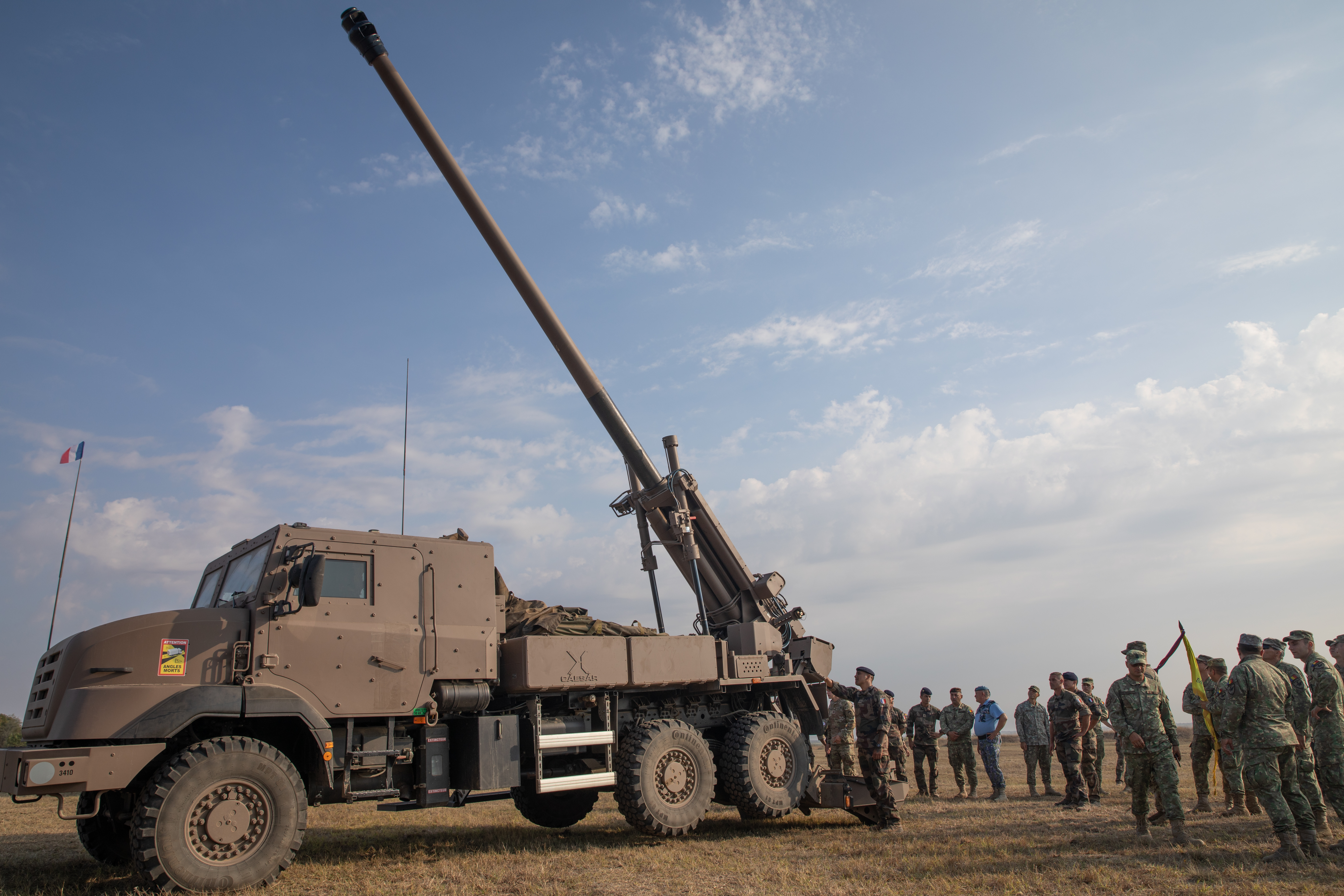
CAESAR artillery system

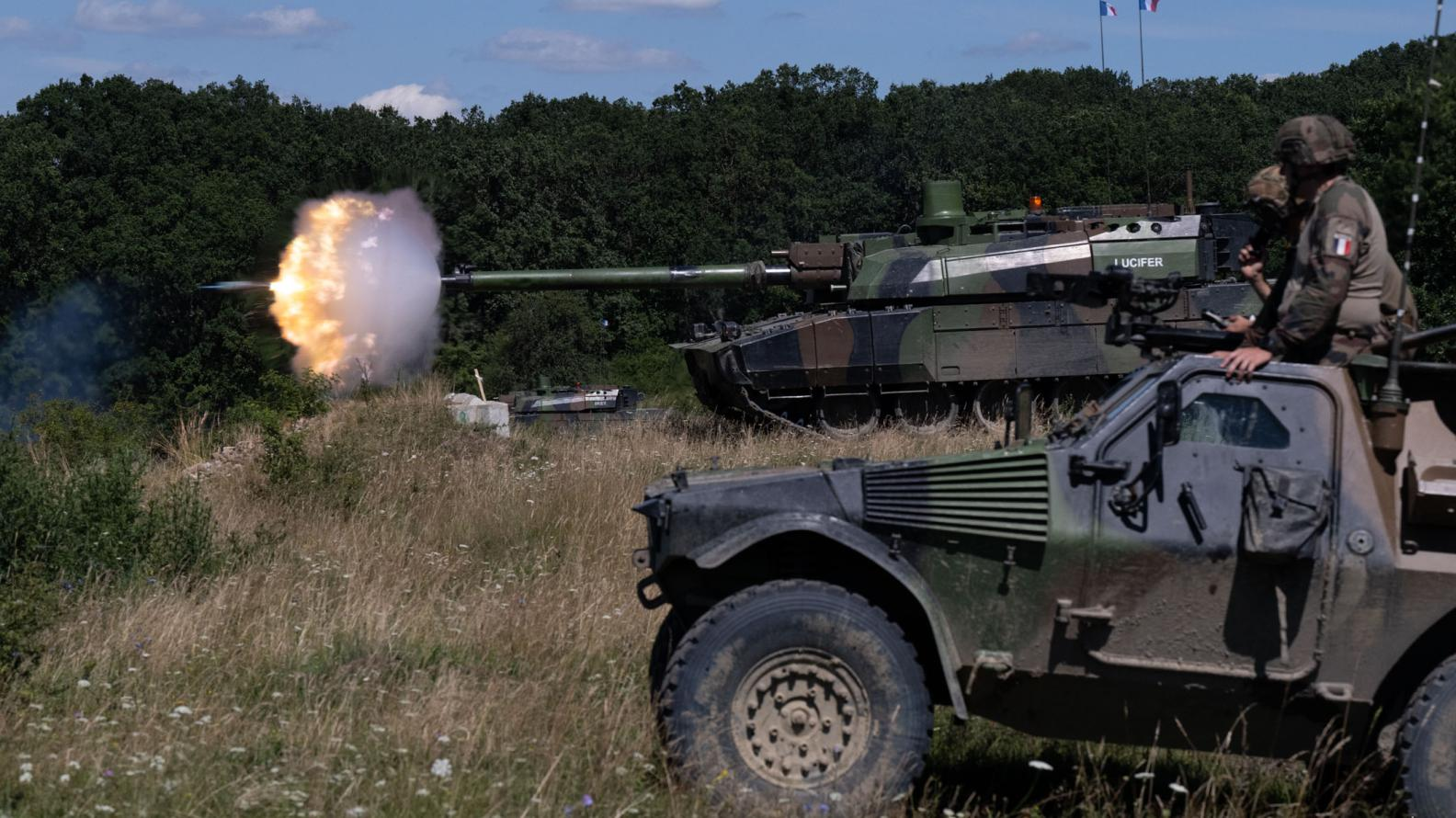
Leclerc tank firing during exercise Eagle Fulger

== See also ==
- French Military Mission to Romania (1916–1918)
- France–Romania relations

== Bibliography ==
- "Press Kit - Mission AIGLE" (PDF). Ministère des Armées. August 2022.
- "Press Kit - French-led NATO multinational battlegroup in Romania" (PDF) (in French). Ministère des Armées. November 2025.
