= Multinational Division South East (NATO) =

Coordinates: 44°24′17.2″N 26°03′06.1″E

- Comandamentul Multinațional de Divizie Sud-Est
- Patch of the Multinational Division South East
- Active: 1 September 2015 – present
- Country: Romania
- Allegiance: NATO
- Type: Division headquarters
- Part of: Multinational Corps Southeast
- Garrison/HQ: Bucharest
- Motto: SEMPER VIGILANTES
- Website: mndse.ro

Commanders
- Commander: Major General Cornel Tonea-Bălan (RO)
- Chief of Staff: Colonel Constantin Paraschivu (RO)
- Deputy Commander: Brigadier General Cyril Mathias (FR)
- Command Senior Enlisted Leader: Staff Senior Warrant Officer Michal Banasik (PL)

Multinational Division South East (HQ MND-SE) is NATO's command and control military body in the South-East region under the Multinational Corps Southeast. The operational control is handled by the Supreme Allied Commander Europe (SACEUR). The headquarters are located in Bucharest, Romania. Established on 31 August 2015, the HQ MND-SE is the restructure of the former Romanian 1st Infantry Division.

== History ==
After the Russian aggression against Ukraine in 2014, a NATO Readiness Action Plan was decided upon during the 2014 Wales summit. To implement this decision, Romania offered to form the Multinational Division South-East Headquarters (MND-SE HQ). This was approved by the Romanian Parliament on 23 June 2015. The 1st Infantry Division handed over the command to the Multinational Division on 31 August 2015, and a day later, the Multinational Division was officially inaugurated. The Division Headquarters were activated several months later, in December. Initial operational capability was achieved in 2016. During exercise LOYAL LEDA 18, the Division was declared fully operational in March 2018 after a ceremony held at the Training Center in Cincu.

On 20 January 2023, the command and control over the Multinational Division was transferred to the Multinational Corps Southeast.

== Role ==
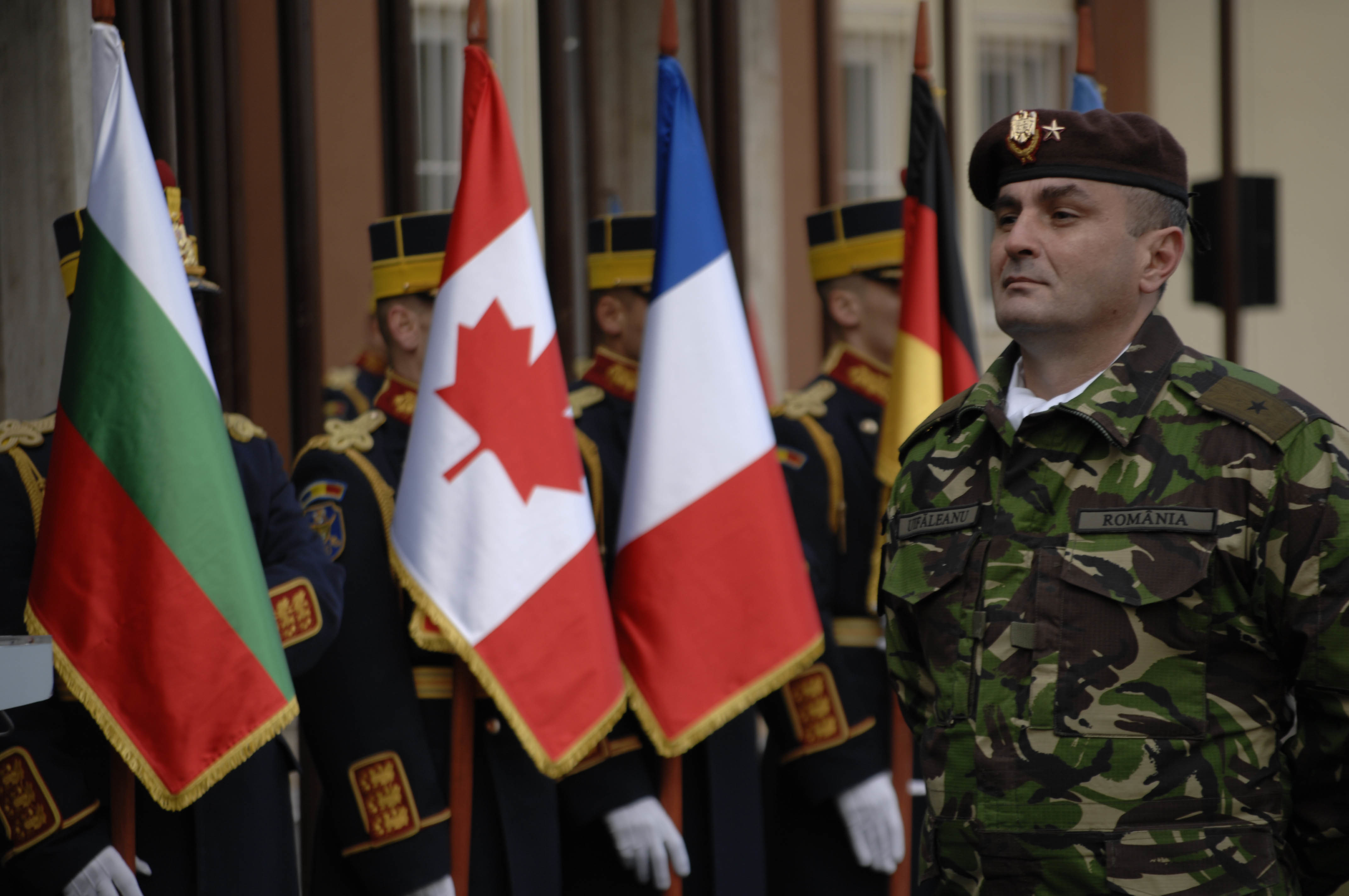
Activation ceremony of the Multinational Division South East

The role of the Multinational Division South East is to coordinate NATO's operations in Romania and Bulgaria, and is able to coordinate NATO's Very High Readiness Joint Task Force during an Article 5 operation. Within NATO's Black Sea security architecture, the Multinational Division complements the allied command and control structure based on the implementation of the Readiness Action Plan.

According to Lieutenant General Alain Parent, Allied Joint Force Command Naples Deputy Commander "This new headquarters, led by Romanian armed forces members, will assure NATO allies of an increased readiness and capability, not only for the Southeast region, but for all NATO territories."

== Structure and personnel ==
- Multinational Division South East – HQ Bucharest
  - Multinational Brigade South-East - headquartered in Craiova, Romania
  - French Brigade Forward Command Element - headquartered in Bucharest
  - Multinational Battlegroup Romania - headquartered in Cincu, Romania
  - Multinational Battlegroup Bulgaria - headquartered in Novo Selo, Bulgaria
  - 300th Support Battalion "SARMIS" - headquartered in Bucharest
  - 45th Communications and Information Battalion "Captain Grigore Giosanu" - headquartered in Bucharest

The officer corps of HQ MND-SE (including warrant officers and non-commissioned officers) is made up of personnel from 14 contributing nations: Albania, Bulgaria, Canada, France, Greece, Hungary, Italy, Montenegro, Poland, Portugal, Slovakia, Spain, Turkey, the United Kingdom, the United States, as well as Romania which acts as the framework nation.

== See also ==
- Multinational Division Central
