= 1st CIMIC Battalion =

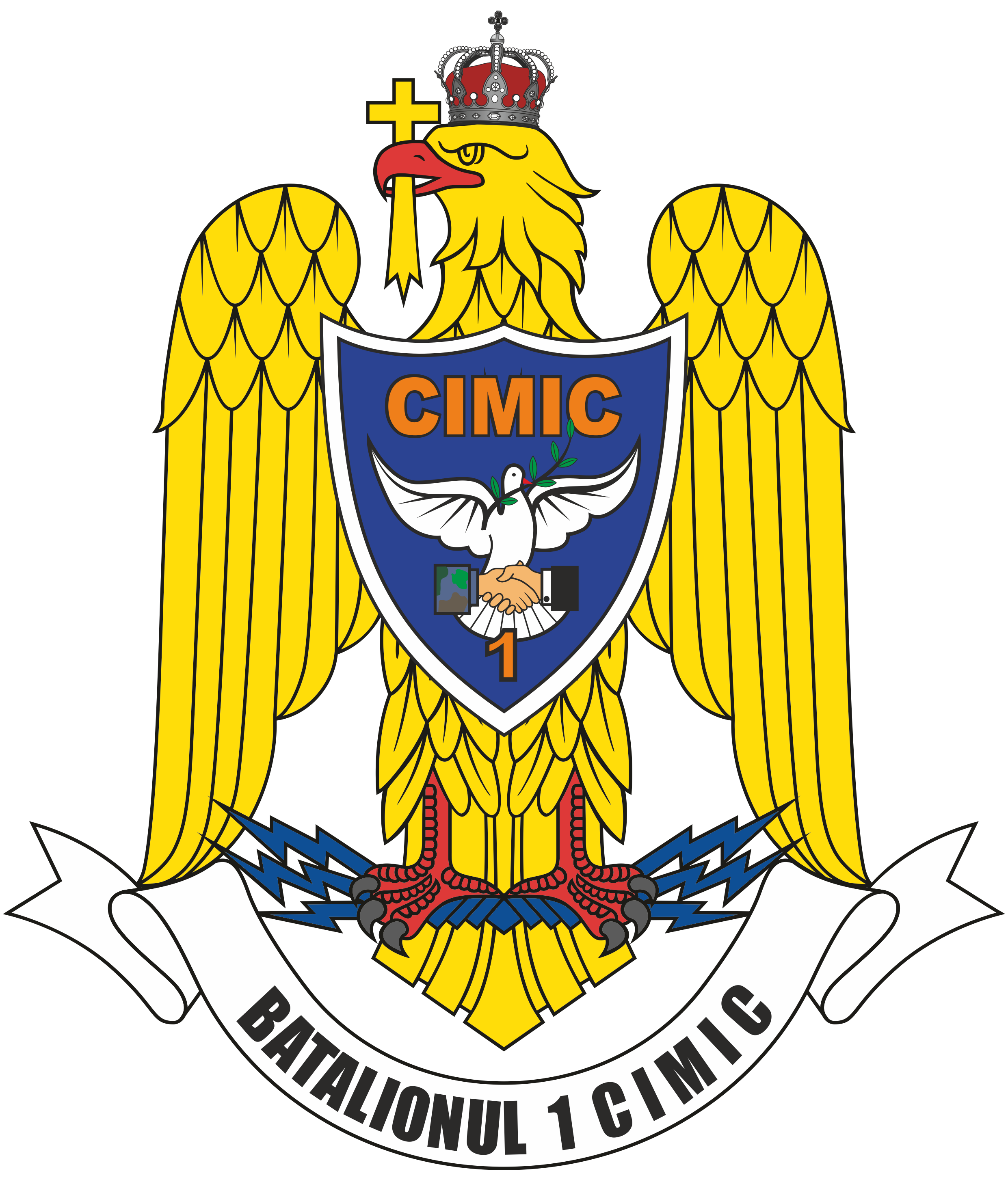
1st CIMIC Battalion Coat of Arms

The 1st CIMIC Battalion, (Batalionul 1 Cooperare Civil-Militară) is the only Civil-Military cooperation battalion of the Romanian Land Forces and was formed in September 2001.

It is subordinated to the Romanian Staff Land Forces and its headquarters are located in Bucharest. The unit became completely operational in 2007 and it participated in peacekeeping missions in Afghanistan, Albania, Angola, Bosnia, Côte d'Ivoire, the Democratic Republic of Congo, Georgia, Iraq, Kosovo and Sudan.
