= Cincu Training Center =

Romanian training range and shooting range

- Centrul național de instruire întrunită "Getica"
- Cincu, Brașov County; Near Făgăraș in Romania
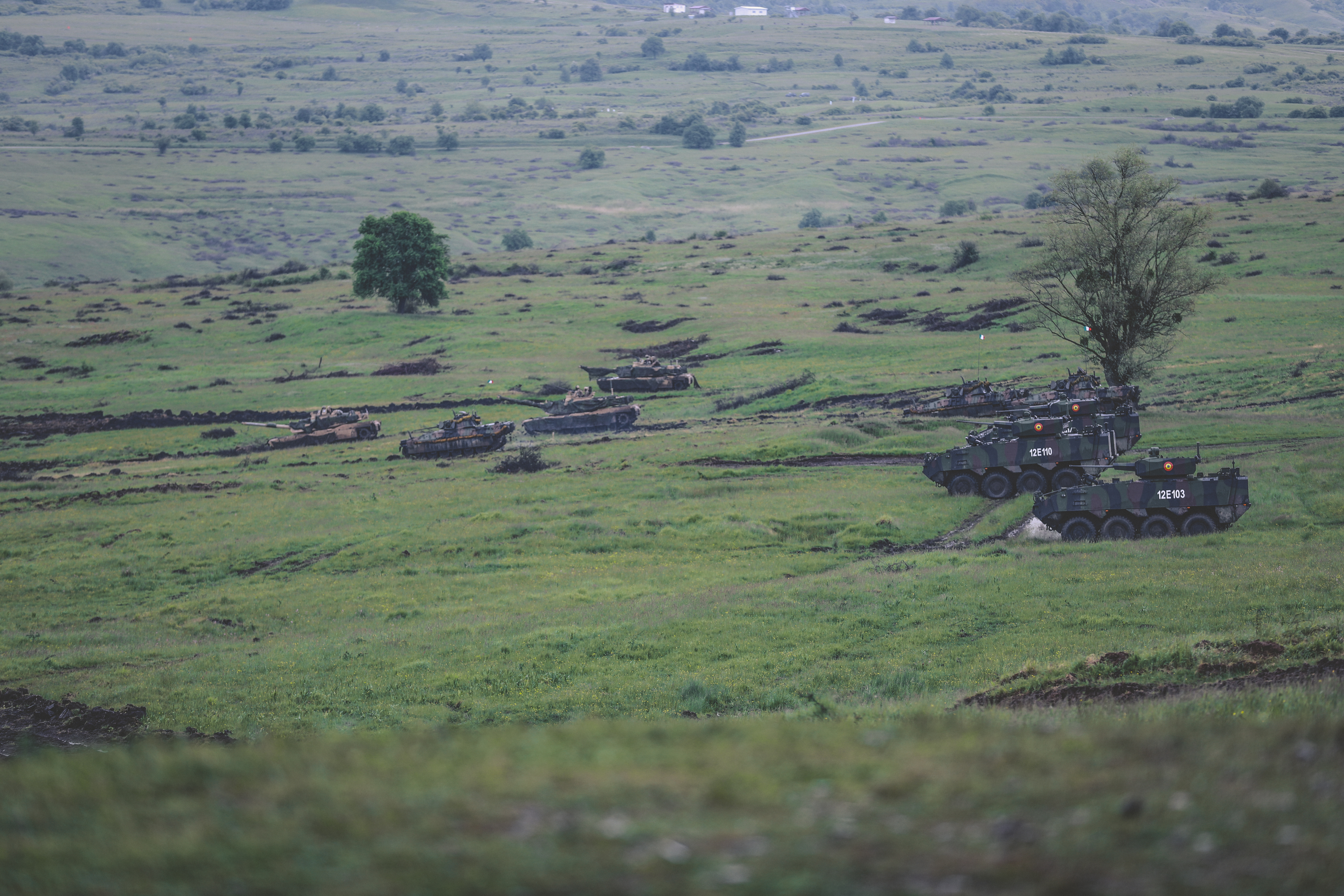
- Piranha V, Dardo IFVs and M1 Abrams tanks during exercise Steadfast Defender 21

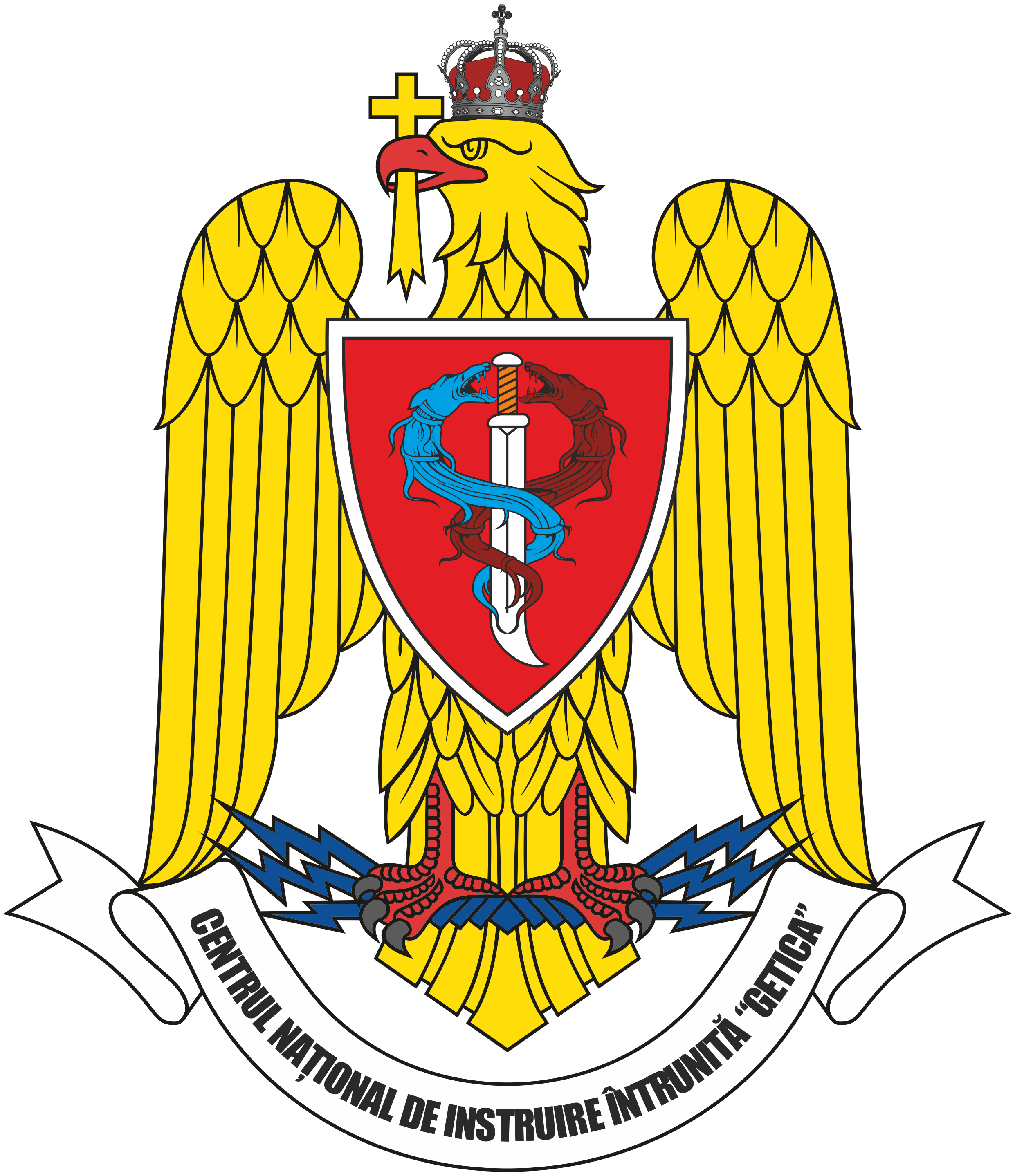
- Coat of arms of the training center

Site information
- Controlled by: Romanian Land Forces; NATO

Location
- Coordinates: 45°55′24.3″N 24°47′46.5″E
- Area: 104 km^{2} (10,400 ha; 40 sq mi)

Site history
- Built: 1919
- In use: 1919–present

Garrison information
- Garrison: Multinational Battlegroup Romania

The Cincu Training Center, officially the National Joint Training Center "Getica" (Romanian: Centrul Național de Instruire Întrunită "Getica") is a training center and shooting range for military personnel and units up to brigade level. It is located in the commune Cincu, Brașov County in the center of Romania. The center is subordinated to the General Staff of the Land Forces.

== History ==
The first training ground in the Cincu area was established in 1913 by the Austro-Hungarian XII. Army Corps. The current training center was established on 2 July 1919 by the Romanian Army as the Cincu Mare Regional Camp, which was part of the 7th Army Corps. The camp was transferred to the Făgăraș Infantry Training Center in 1940. During World War II, it was used as a joint Romanian-German training base for exercises with infantry weaponry and anti-tank guns.

In 1953, the camp was reorganized with the current boundaries being set and the Central Artillery Range (Military Unit 04785) being formed from the previous camp. The range was reorganized again in 1959, receiving the present-day designation of Military Unit 01495. In 2007, the Combat Training Center of the Land Forces was established from the previous Central Artillery Range, and the honorary name "Getica" was received a year later. The total area of the training center is 104 km^{2} (10,400 ha; 40 sq mi), spanning to both the Brașov and Sibiu County.

In 2017, the center was redesignated as the National Joint Training Center following the example of the Hohenfels Training Area. The Cincu Training Center also has several structures subordinated to it: the Smârdan and Babadag Training Areas, the Plenița MOUT Training Center, the Lerești CBRN Training Center, the Bucium Training Ground, and the Cârțișoara Training Ground. Around 330 modernization projects are expected to be completed by 2026.

== Multinational Battlegroup ==
In response to the Russian invasion of Ukraine in 2022, a Multinational Battlegroup was created in Romania. With France as the lead nation, the initial Battle Group Forward Presence (BGFP) formed from NATO Response Force elements was deployed to Cincu starting in May 2022 under the code-named Mission Aigle. Since then, the French and Belgian engineers built a military base for the newly deployed forces. Other elements of the Battlegroup are kept at the Mihail Kogălniceanu Air Base in Constanța.

The headquarters of the French military forces in Cincu received the name "Camp Général Berthelot" in June 2024, in honor of the French General Henri Mathias Berthelot.

== Gallery ==
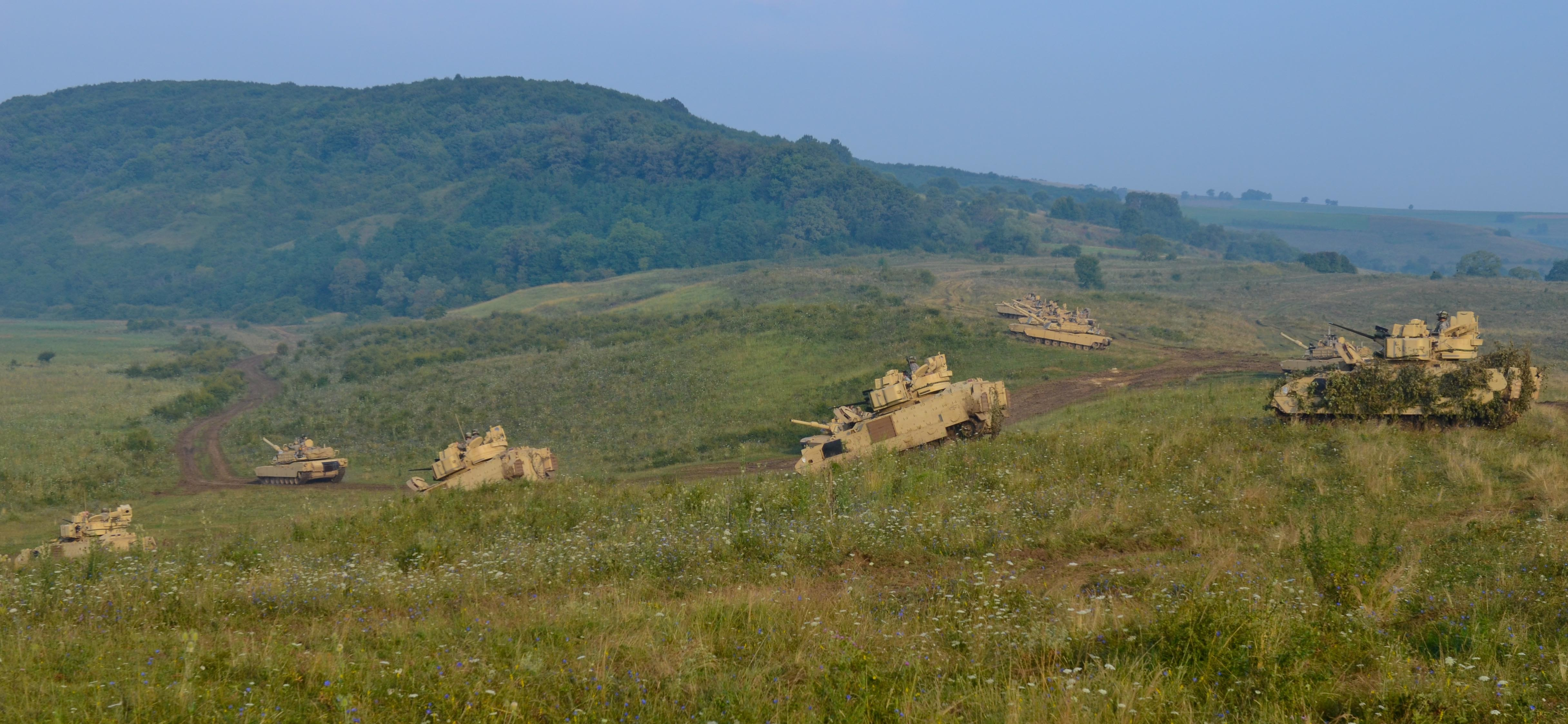
3rd Battalion, 116th Cavalry Brigade commences a movement to contact operation

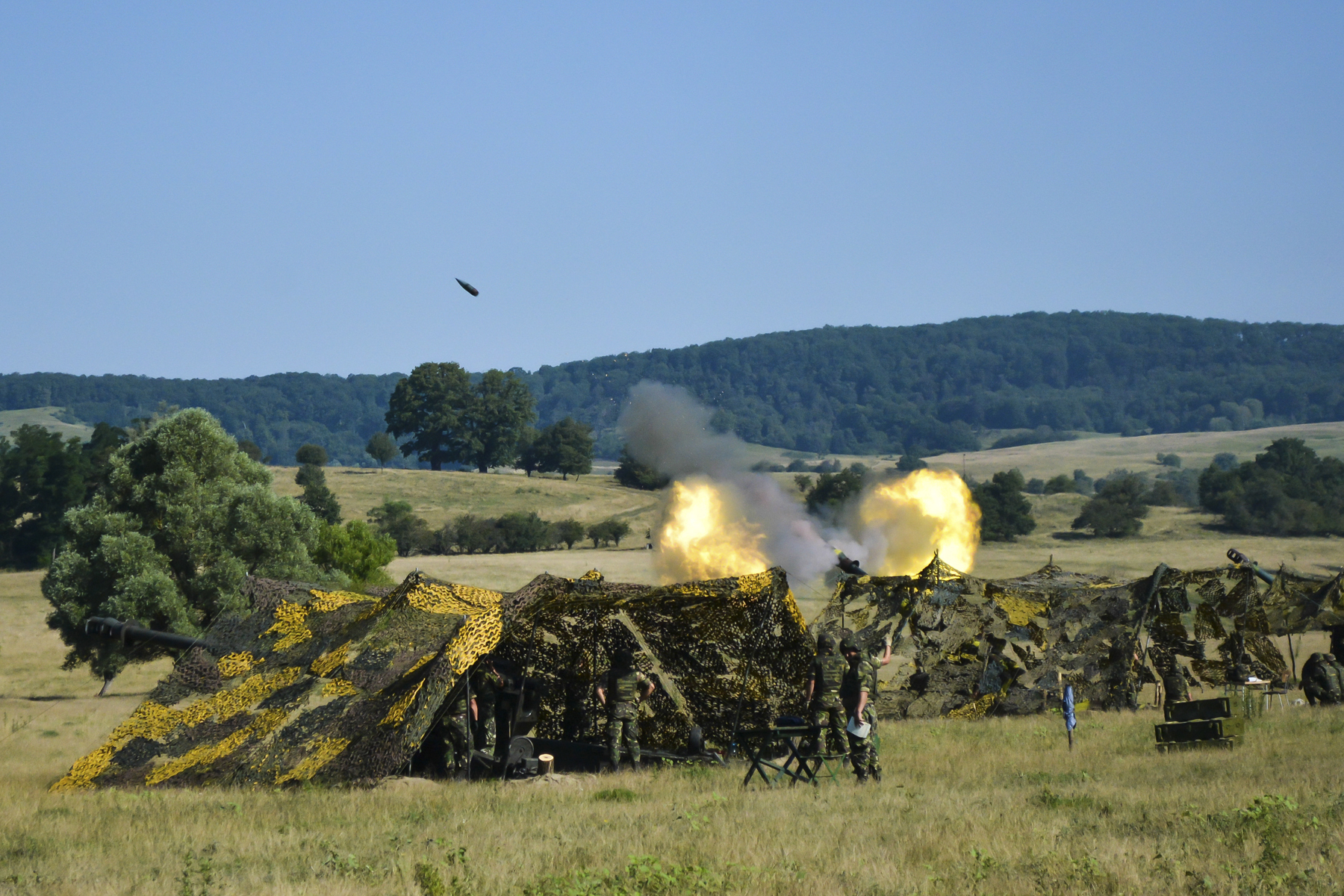
Romanian artillery conducting a live-fire exercise

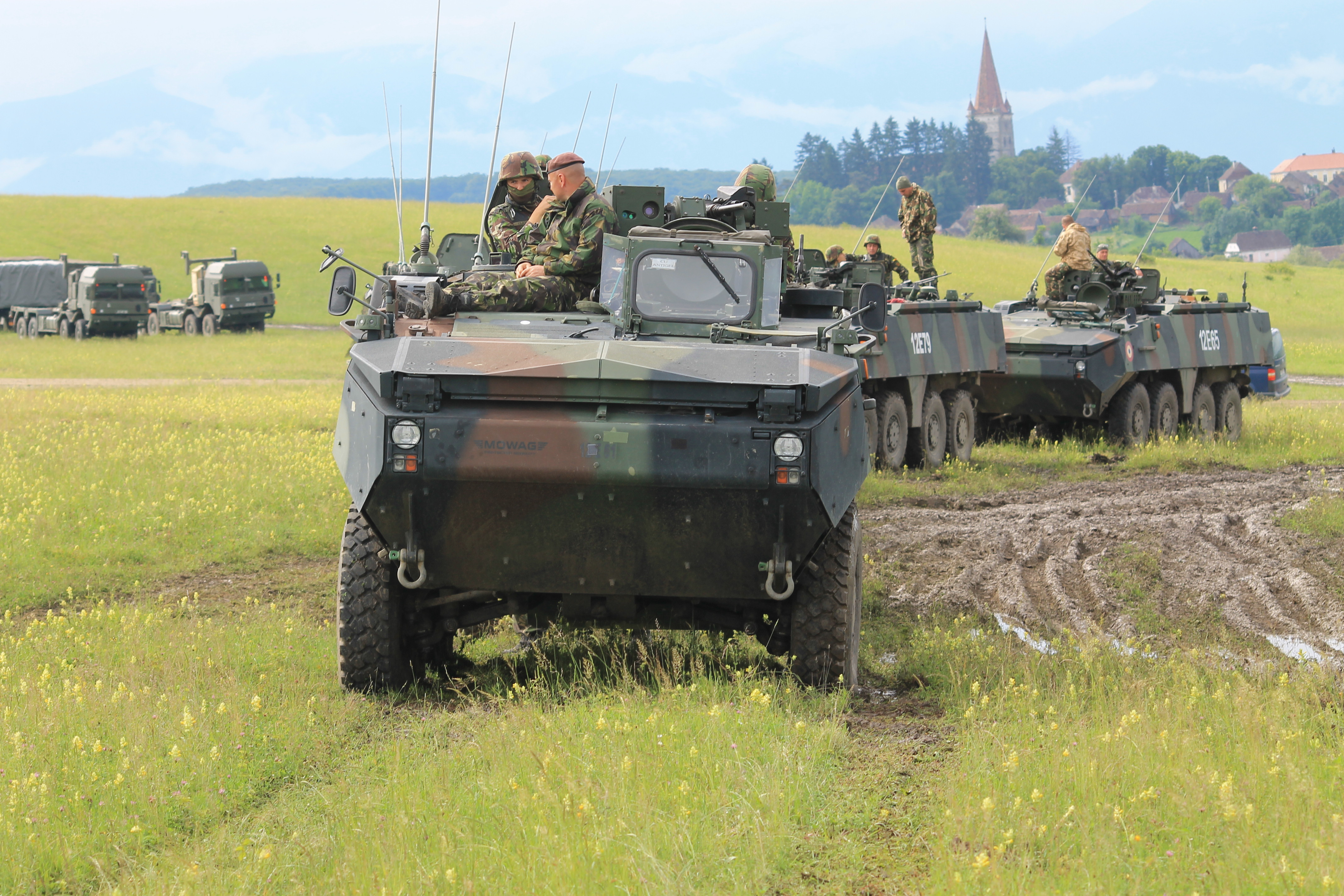
Romanian Piranha III APCs during Noble Jump 2017

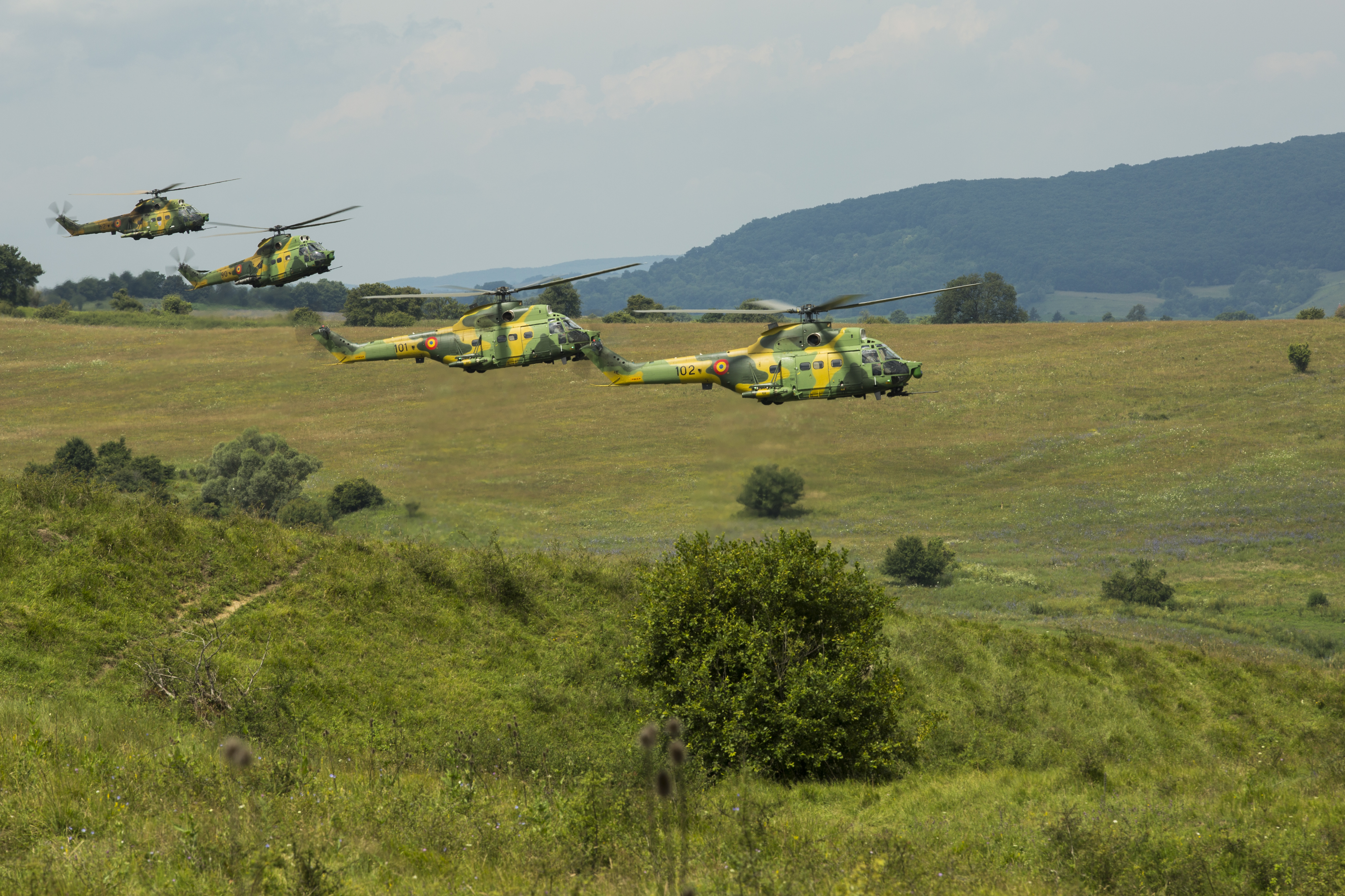
IAR 330 Puma SOCAT helicopters in a combined arms exercise

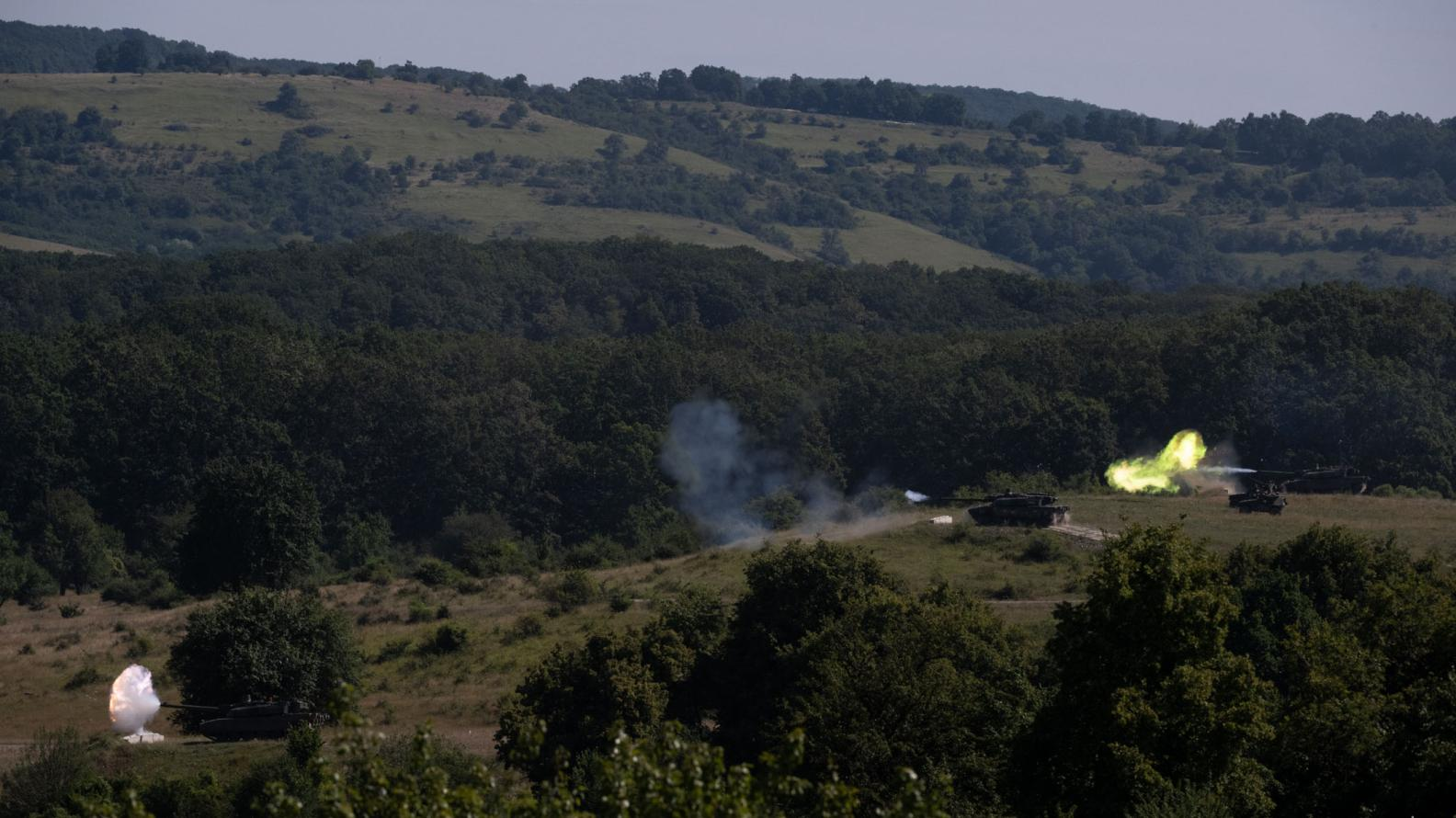
French Leclerc tanks shooting during exercise Eagle Fulger in 2023

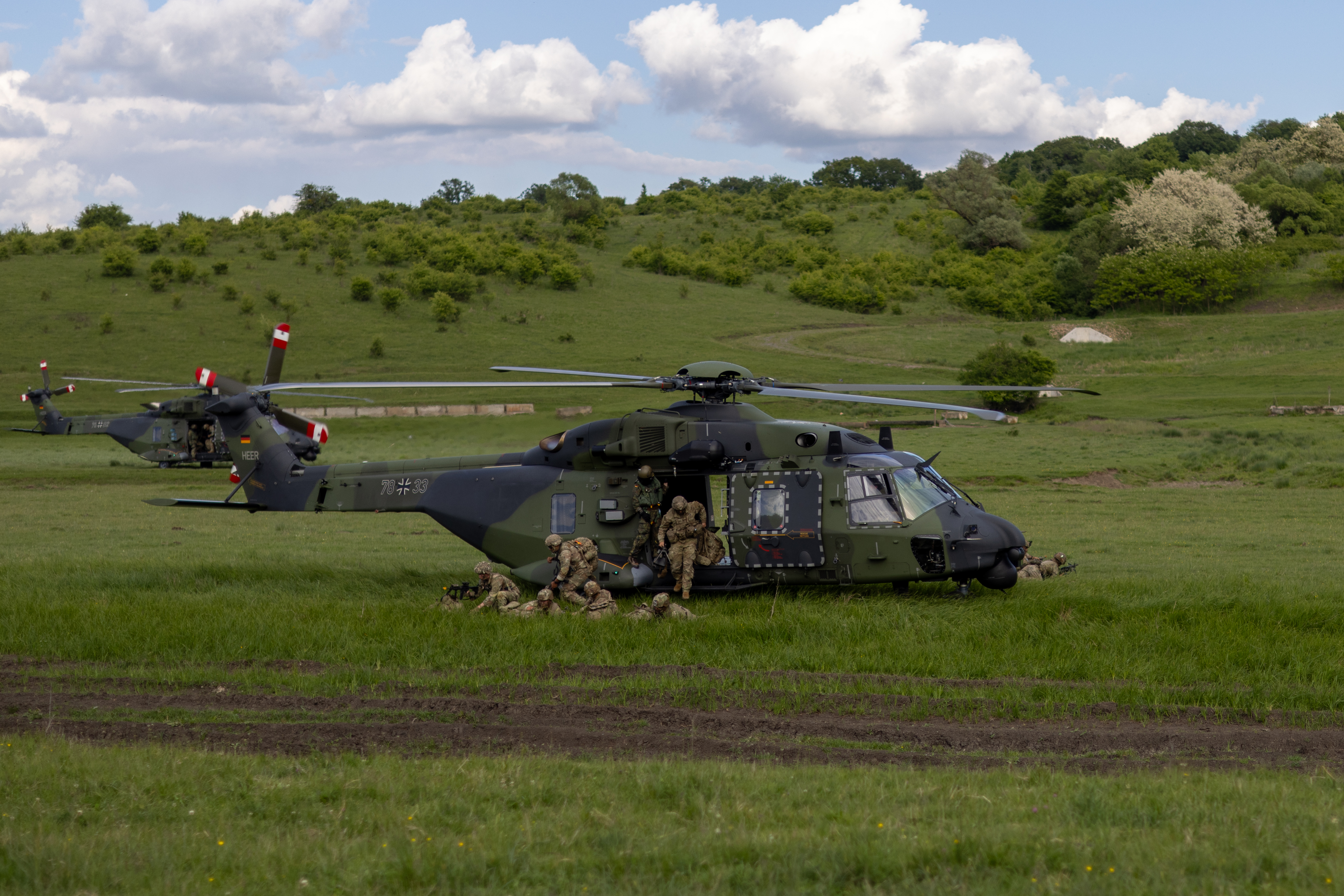
82nd Airborne Division conducts an air assault operation with German NH90s during Swift Response 24

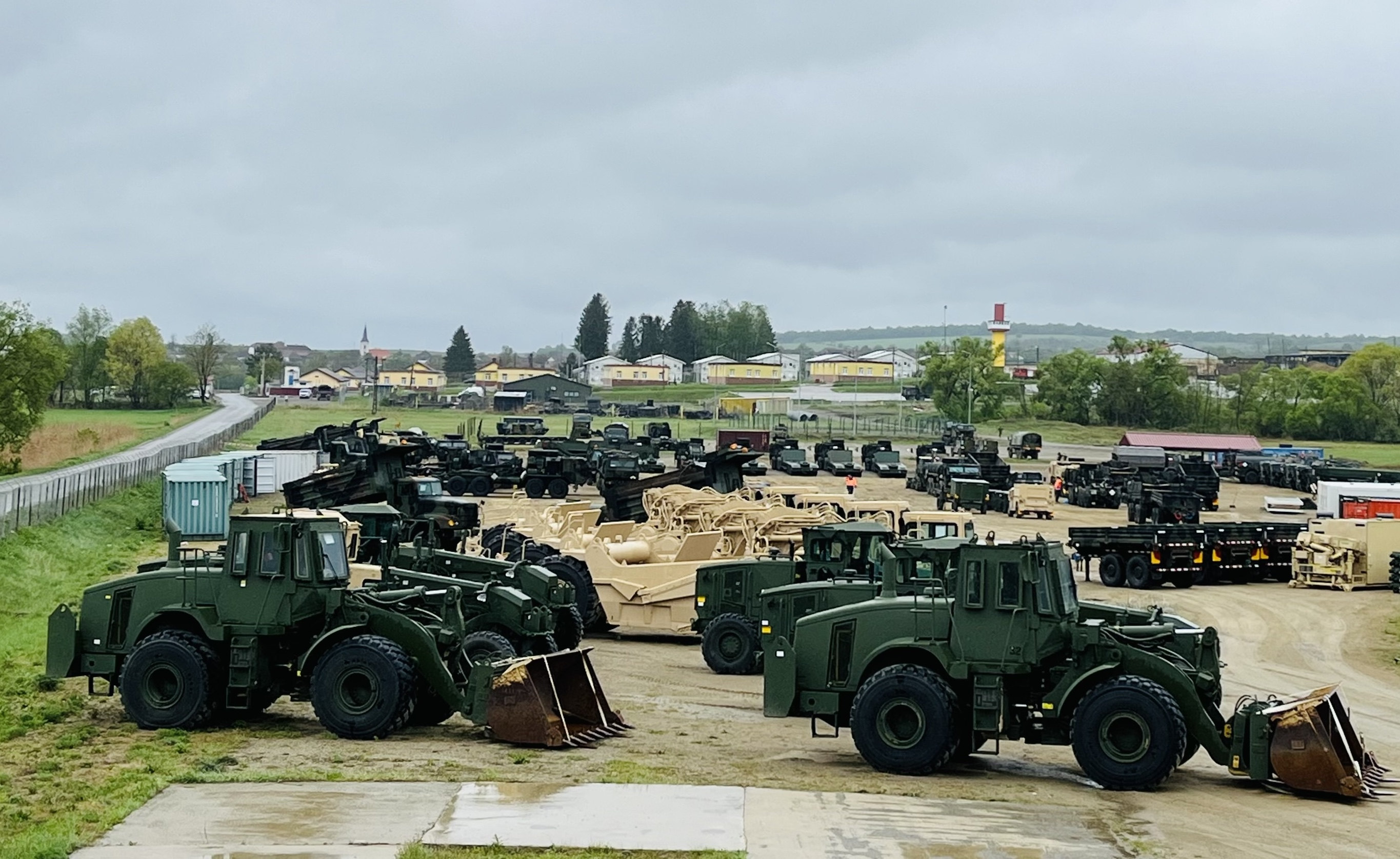
Army Prepositioned Stock-2 engineer equipment at Cincu in support of Resolute Castle 24
