= 4th Territorial Army Corps =

Corps of the Romanian Land Forces

The 4th Territorial Army Corps previously the 4th Army Corps was a corps of the Romanian Land Forces active from at least 1941 to 2000.

Army corps general Constantin Prezan transferred from command of the 3rd Army Corps in 1914 to command of the 4th Army Corps in 1915–1916.

The 4th Army Corps was active during the most intense phases of Romanian actions on the Eastern Front of World War II. On June 22, 1941, at the start of Operation Barbarossa, it was part of the Third Army and comprised the 6th and 7th Infantry Divisions. By the time the Siege of Odessa was underway, it was part of the Fourth Army, with the 8th and 14th Infantry Divisions under its command. By October-November 1942, approaching the Battle of Stalingrad, it comprised the 1st Cavalry Division and 13th Infantry Division.

Its commanders were :

- Dumitru Coroamă (September 1940 – January 1941)
- Constantin Sănătescu (January 1941 – March 1943)
- Gheorghe Rozin (March 1943 – January 1944)
- Cosma Marin Popescu (January 1944 – May 1944)
- Nicolae Scarlat Stoenescu (May 1944 – December 1944)
- Ion Boițeanu (December 1944 – August 1945)
- Agricola Filip (August 1945)

In 2000 4th Army Corps was reformed from 4th Army, and became 4th Territorial Army Corps "Mareșal Constantin Prezan" (Corpul 4 Armată Territorial "Mareșal Constantin Prezan"). By 2008 it comprised the 18th Infantry Brigade, 81st Mechanized Brigade, 61st Mountain Troops Brigade, 4th Logistics Base, 69th Mixed Artillery Brigade, 50th Anti-Aircraft Missile Regiment, plus combat service support battalions. Corps headquarters was located at Cluj-Napoca.

However, the corps was again redesignated 4th Infantry Division on June 15, 2008.
