= 4th Infantry Division (Romania) =

4th Infantry Division "Gemina"
- Divizia 4 Infanterie "Gemina"
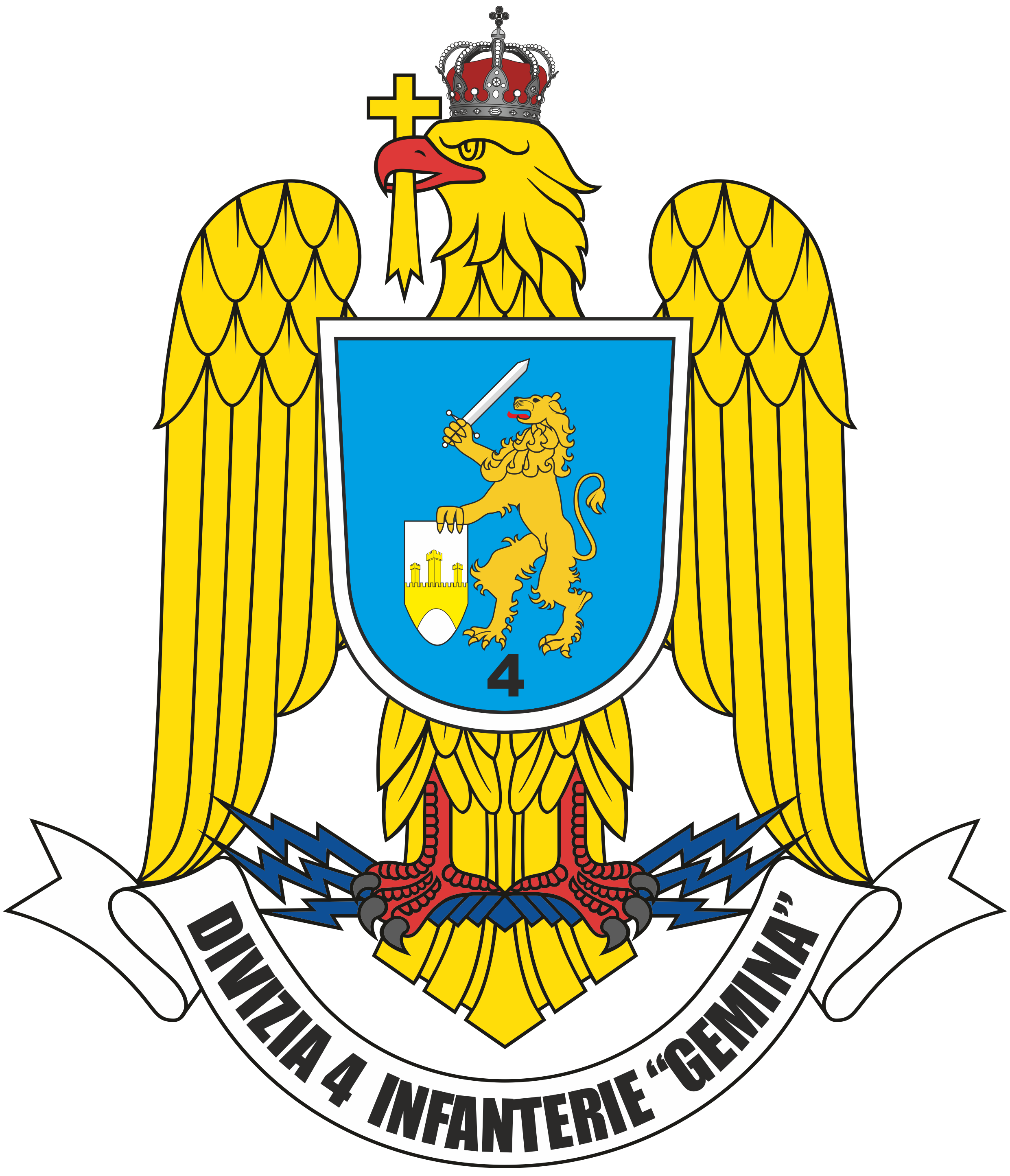
- Official coat of arms of the 4th Infantry Division
- Active: 15 June 2008 – present
- Country: Romania
- Branch: Romanian Land Forces
- Type: Infantry
- Size: 3 brigades, 3 regiments, 1 logistics base, 1 EOD group and 5 auxiliary battalions
- Garrison/HQ: Cluj-Napoca
- Engagements: World War II

Commanders
- Current commander: Major General Bogdan Cernat

The 4th Infantry Division Gemina is one of the major units of the Romanian Land Forces, with its headquarters in Cluj-Napoca. Until 15 June 2008 it was designated as the 4th Territorial Army Corps "Mareșal Constantin Prezan" (Corpul 4 Armată Territorial "Mareșal Constantin Prezan"). It is the heraldic successor of the Fourth Army.

The honorary name of the division, Gemina, is a reference to the Roman Legio XIII Gemina which was stationed in Roman Dacia at Apulum (modern day Alba Iulia).

== Structure ==
4th Infantry Division "Gemina" organization as of October 2026 (click to enlarge)

- 4th Infantry Division "Gemina", in Cluj-Napoca
  - 2nd Mountain Troops Brigade "Sarmizegetusa", in Brașov
  - 61st Mountain Troops Brigade "General Virgil Bădulescu", in Miercurea Ciuc
  - 81st Mechanized Brigade "General Grigore Bălan", in Bistrița
  - 3rd Explosive Ordnance Disposal (EOD) Group, in Bistrița
  - 4th Logistics Base "Transilvania", in Dej
  - 50th Anti-aircraft Missile Regiment "Andrei Mureșianu", in Florești
  - 53rd Engineer Battalion "Scorilo", in Deva
  - 55th Communication and Informatics Battalion (CIS) "Napoca", in Cluj-Napoca
  - 69th Artillery Regiment "Silvania", in Șimleu Silvaniei
  - 72nd CBRN Battalion "Negru Vodă"', in Sighișoara
  - 317th Intelligence, Surveillance and Reconnaissance (ISR) Regiment "Vlădeasa", in Cluj-Napoca
  - 400th Support Battalion "Feleacu", in Cluj-Napoca
  - 691st Anti-Tank Artillery Battalion "General Ion Dragalina", in Zalău

== Decorations ==
The 4th Infantry Division has received the following decorations:

- Order of Military Virtue, Peacetime (Knight – 2011; Officer – 2016; Commander – 2021; Grand Officer – 2023)
