= 15th Mechanized Brigade =

15th Mechanized Brigade "Podul Înalt"
- Brigada 15 Mecanizată "Podul Înalt"
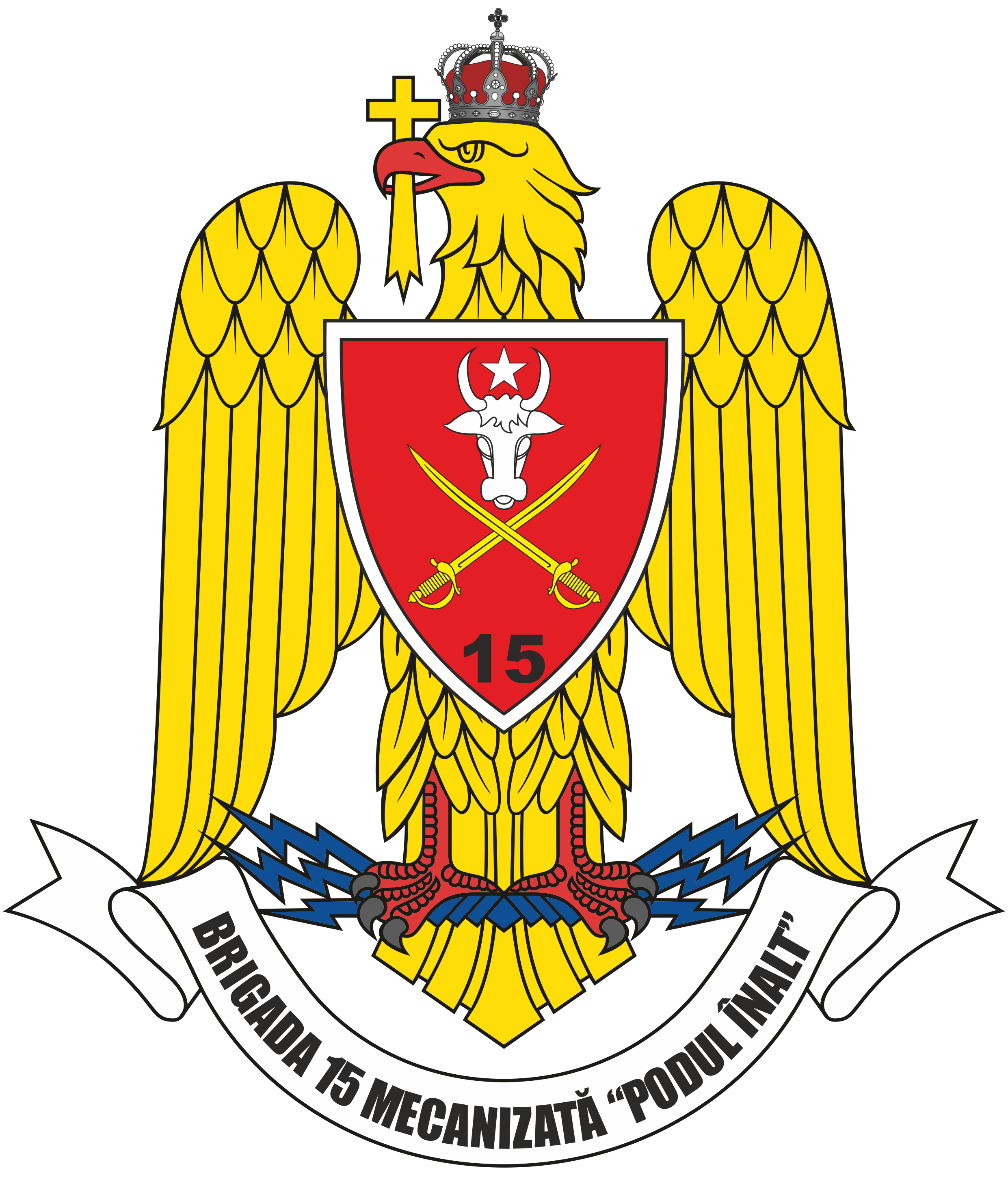
- Insignia of the 15th Mechanized Brigade "Podul Înalt"
- Active: 1 January 1877 – 1 December 1951 (as the 15th Dorobanți Regiment); 1961 – 1994 (as the 15th Mechanized Regiment); 1 July 1994 – present (current form)
- Country: Romania
- Branch: Romanian Land Forces
- Type: Mechanized Infantry
- Size: 7 battalions + other supporting companies
- Part of: 2nd Infantry Division "Getica"
- Garrison/HQ: Iași
- Nickname: Podu Înalt
- March: Palatul Oștirii
- Engagements: War of Independence; Second Balkan War; World War I Hungarian–Romanian War; World War II; Operation Enduring Freedom; Iraq War

Commanders
- Current commander: Colonel Dan Valer Orza

The 15th Mechanized Brigade (Romanian: Brigada 15 Mecanizată "Podul Înalt") is a mechanized brigade of the Romanian Land Forces. It was formed on 1 July 1994 from the ex 15th Mechanized Regiment, and named after the "Battle of Podul Înalt". The brigade is currently subordinated to the 2nd Infantry Division, and its headquarters are located in Iași.

== History ==
=== Origins to World War I ===
The 15th Mechanized Brigade is the successor of the 15th Dorobanți Regiment established on 1 January 1877. It was headquartered at Piatra Neamț and had two battalions with four companies each. During the War of Independence, the regiment participated in the battles of Plevna, Rahova, and Vidin. On 15 July 1891, it received the name "Războieni" (after the 15th century Battle of Războieni).

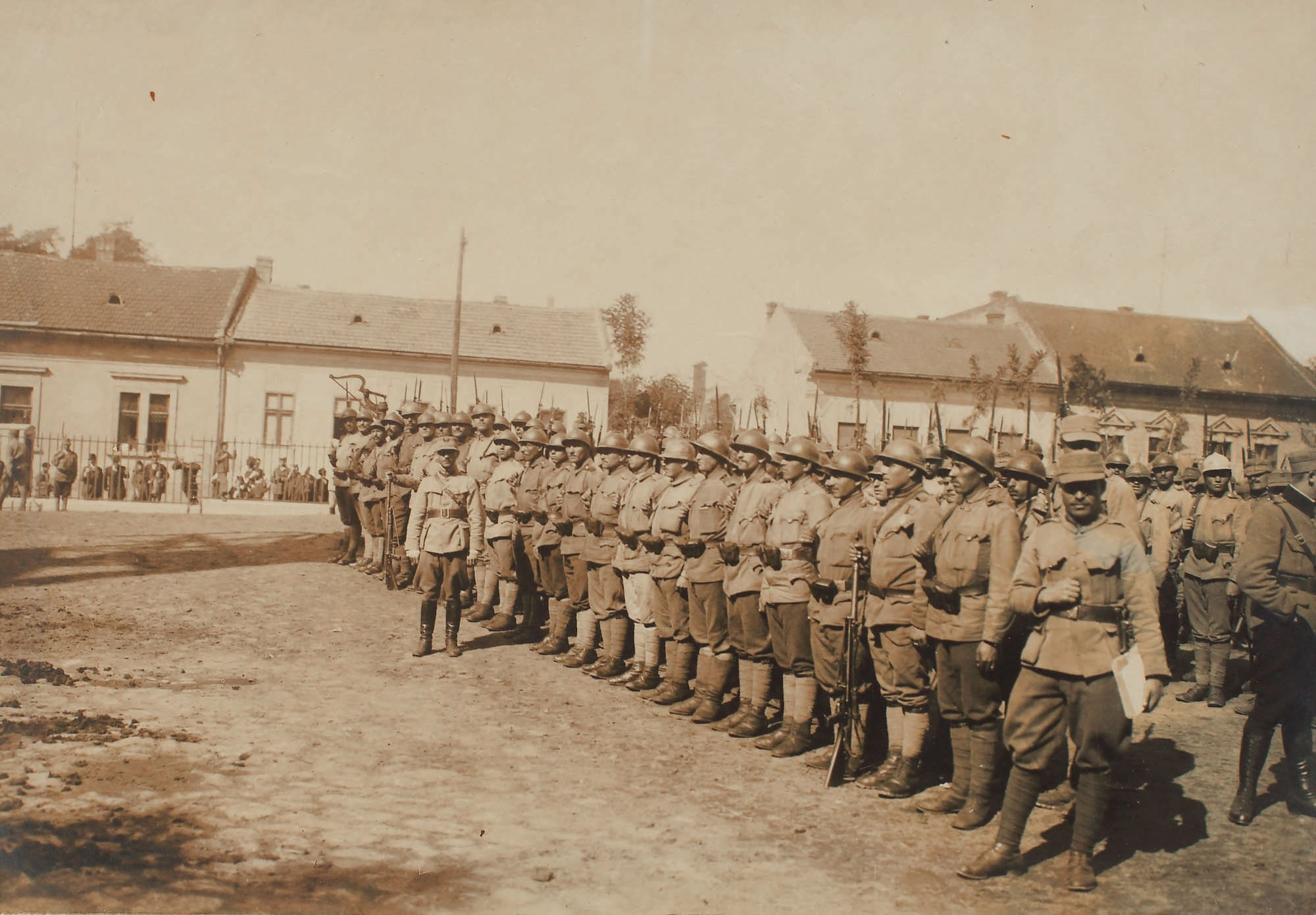
2nd Battalion of the 15th Regiment in the barracks of Újpest in 1919

The 15th Războieni Regiment participated in the Second Balkan War, then in World War I. During the war, the regiment acted in the Eastern Carpathians, at Miecurea-Ciuc, Odorhei, Poiana Uzului and in the Wallachian Plain as part of the 7th Infantry Division. A period of inactivity followed after the Armistice of Focșani, only for the regiment to take an active part in the campaign of 1918 and 1919. For its feats of arms during the campaigns, the battle flag of the 15th Regiment was decorated with the Order of the Star of Romania.

=== World War 2 to present ===
In 1932, the regiment was transferred to the 6th Infantry Division. During the Second World War, the regiment fought on the Eastern Front. It fought in Bessarabia, then at Odessa. In 1942, the 1st Battalion of the regiment fought in the Battle of Stalingrad as part of the "General Lascăr" Group. Until 1944, the regiment was located in its garrison, being moved to the fortified line south of Pașcani in March.

After the 1944 Romanian coup d'état, the 15th Infantry Training Regiment participated in further battles in Transylvania, Hungary and Czechoslovakia until the end of the war. After the war, it was moved to the Bacău Garrison, being also merged with the 16th Dorobanți Regiment. The 15th Regiment was itself disbanded in December 1951, and its soldiers moved to Buzău.

The regiment was reactivated in 1959 in the Iași Garrison, converting to a mechanized regiment in 1961 and received the name "Războieni" again in 1969. In 1994, it was transformed into the 15th Mechanized Brigade and renamed to "Podul Înalt" in 1996, while the name "Războieni" was given to the 151st Infantry Battalion of the brigade. The original barracks of the regiment in Piatra Neamț are currently occupied by the 634th Infantry Battalion.

The 151st and 634th Infantry Battalions were deployed to Afghanistan several times in support of Operation Enduring Freedom starting from 2003. The 151st Battalion also participated in Operation Iraqi Freedom in 2008. Other international deployments were to Angola, Bosnia and Herzegovina, and Albania.

== Organization ==
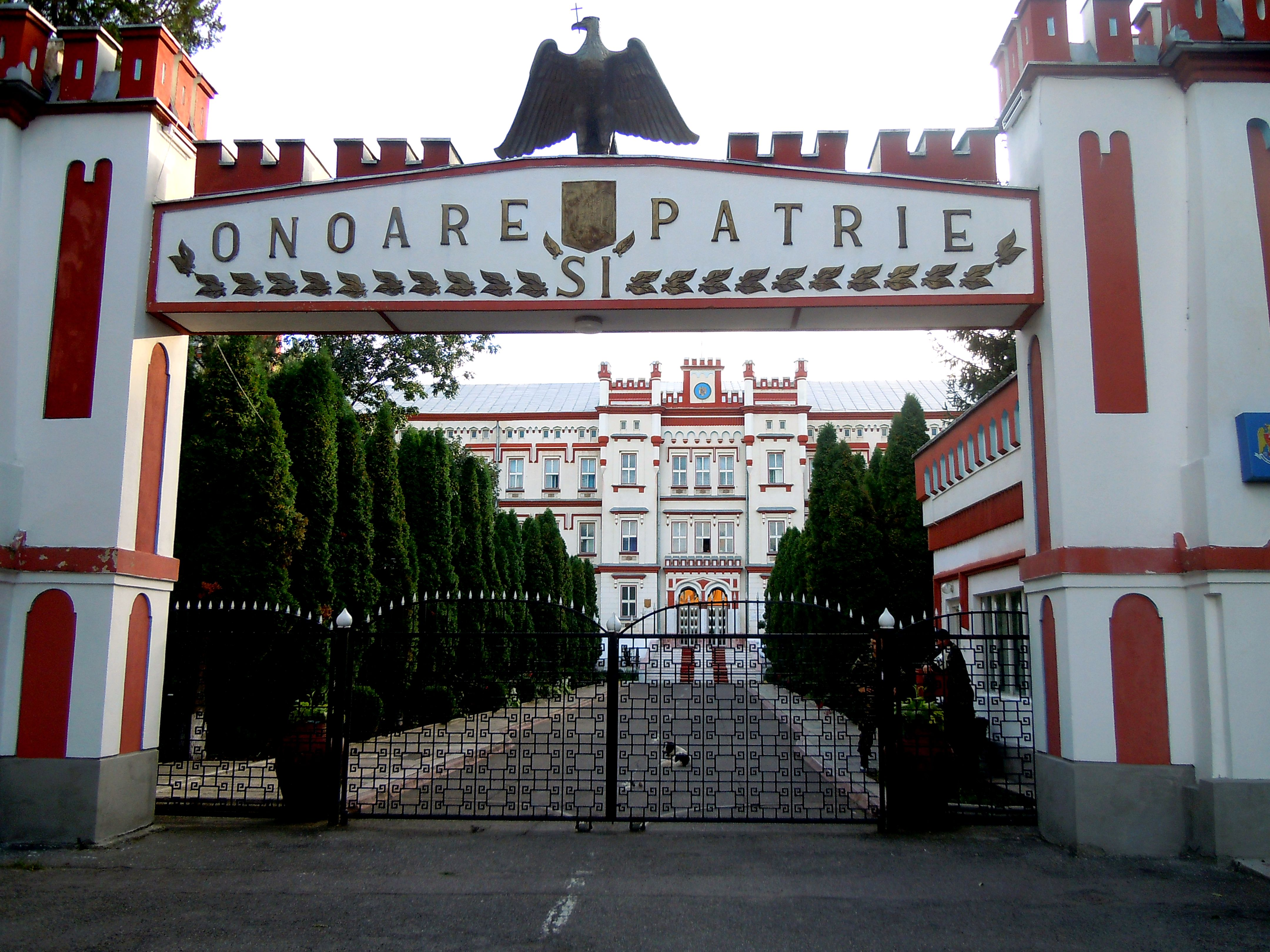
Barracks of the 15th Mechanized Brigade in Iași

- 15th Mechanized Brigade "Podul Înalt", in Iași
  - 631st Tank Battalion "Oituz", in Bacău, with TR-85 main battle tanks
  - 814th Tank Battalion "Mihai Vodă", in Turda, with TR-85 main battle tanks and Otokar Cobra II
  - 151st Infantry Battalion "Războieni", in Iași, with Otokar Cobra II and Quantum Systems Vector
  - 634th Infantry Battalion "Mareșal Jósef Piłsudski", in Piatra Neamț, with Otokar Cobra II
  - 335th Artillery Battalion "Alexandru cel Bun", in Botoșani, with Otokar Cobra II
  - 3rd Anti-aircraft Defence Battalion "Potaissa", in Turda, with Flakpanzer Gepard and KP-SAM Chiron
  - 198th Logistic Support Battalion "Prut", in Iași
  - 159th Reconnaissance Company, with Otokar Cobra II
  - 160th Communications and Information Technology Company
  - 161st Military Police Company
  - 162nd CBRN Defence Company
  - 163rd Engineer Company
  - 199th Support Company

== Decorations ==
Pre–1994

The 15th Infantry Regiment has received the following decorations:

- Order of the Star of Romania (Knight – 1919)

Post–1994

The 15th Mechanized Brigade has received the following decorations:

- National Order of Merit, Peacetime (Knight – 2017)
- Order of Military Virtue, Peacetime (Knight – 2016; Officer – 2023)
