= 634th Infantry Battalion (Romania) =

634th Infantry Battalion "Marshal Józef Piłsudski"
- Batalionul 634 Infanterie "Mareșal Jósef Piłsudski"
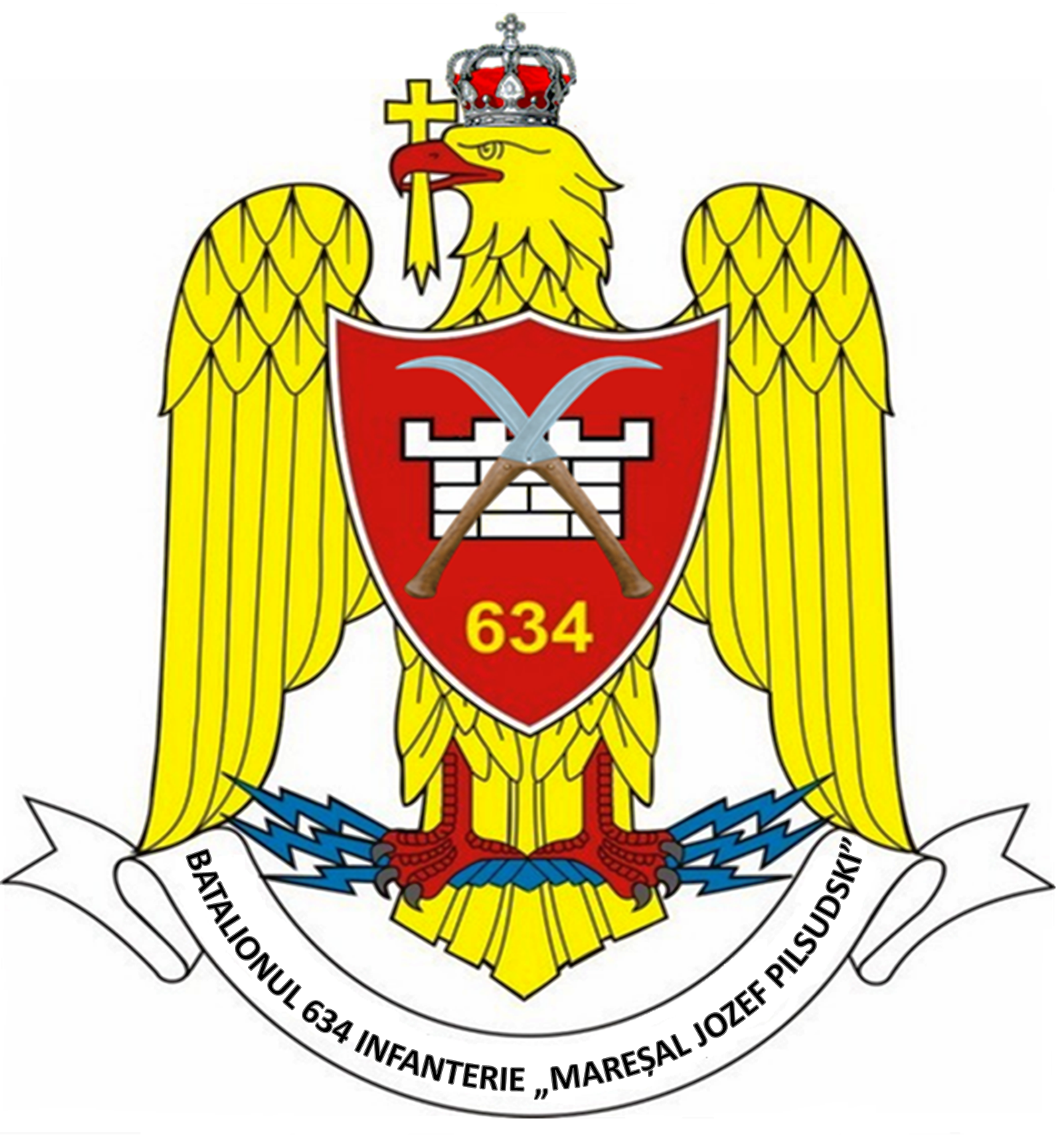
- Insignia of the 634th Infantry Battalion "Mareșal Jósef Piłsudski"
- Active: 2 April 1994–present
- Country: Romania
- Branch: Romanian Land Forces
- Part of: 15th Mechanized Brigade
- Garrison/HQ: Piatra Neamț
- Patron: Marshal Józef Piłsudski
- Engagements: Iraq War; War in Afghanistan
- Decorations: Order of Military Virtue

Commanders
- Current commander: Lieutenant colonel Silviu Veleșcu

The 634th Infantry Battalion "Marshal Józef Piłsudski" (Romanian: Batalionul 634 Infanterie "Mareșal Jósef Piłsudski") is an infantry battalion of the Romanian Land Forces based in Piatra Neamț. It was formed on 2 April 1994 and is part of the 15th Mechanized Brigade. On 14 February 2020, it received the honorific name Marshal Józef Piłsudski, thus carrying over the traditions of the 16th Dorobanți Regiment "Józef Piłsudski".

== History ==
The 634th Infantry Battalion was established on 2 April 1994 as the 567th Infantry Battalion. The battalion was formed from the disbanded 38th Mechanized Regiment "Neagoe Basarab" along with the 38th Training and Storage Center. In 1995, the 567th was transformed into the 634th Infantry Battalion at the same time receiving the name "Petrodava" and was subordinated to the 63rd Tank Brigade from Bacău. The subunits of the battalion were also equipped with MLIs. Since 2001, the battalion received the Dumbrava garrison depot, and the Dealul Vulpii shooting range from the General Staff of the Land Forces.

After the 63rd Tank Brigade was disbanded in 2005, the battalion was moved to the 15th Mechanized Brigade. At the same time, the 38th Training Center was also disbanded. Between 2003 and 2021, the 634th Battalion participated in international missions and exercises carried out in Iraq, Afghanistan, Moldova, Ukraine and Bulgaria. It was the last Romanian unit to leave Afghanistan on 26 June 2021 during the Allied withdrawal.

The battle flag of the unit also received several awards: Emblem of Honor of the Land Forces; Emblem of Honor of the Defense Staff; and the Order of Military Virtue Knight class with war insignia.

Due to the close cooperation in military exercises between the Romanian 15th Mechanized Brigade and the Polish 17th Mechanized Brigade, and the 1st Logistics Battalion of the Brigade receiving the heritage of the 57th Infantry Regiment "King Carol II of Romania", the 634th Battalion received the honorific name "Marshal Józef Piłsudski" on 14 February 2020, thus carrying the traditions of the 16th Dorobanți Regiment "Józef Piłsudski".

=== 16th Dorobanți Regiment ===
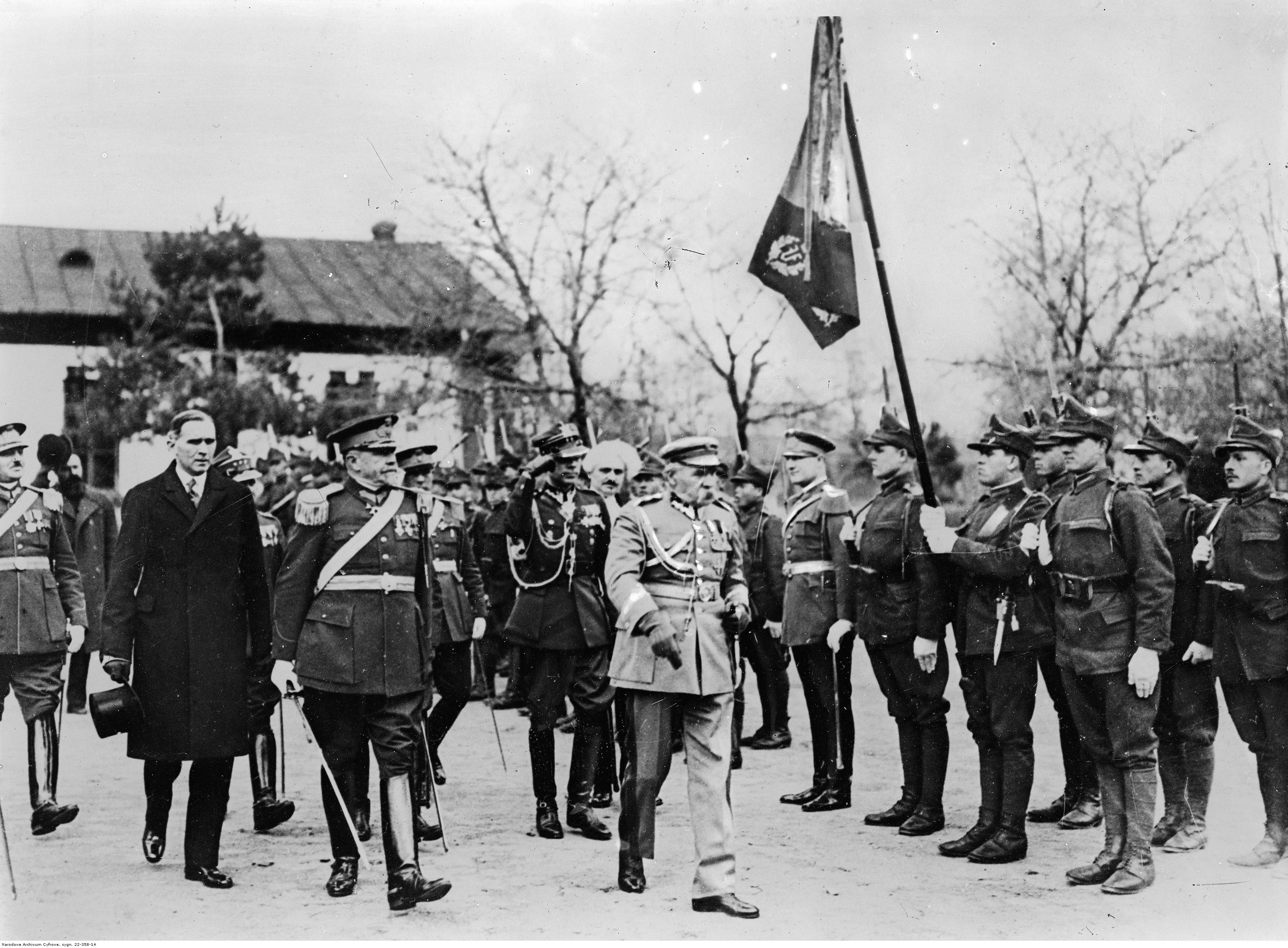
Józef Piłsudski's visit to the 16th Regiment in 1932

The 16th Dorobanți Regiment (Regimentul 16 Dorobanți) was created on 1 January 1877, establishing its garrison at Fălticeni where it would be permanently stationed from 1891, with a barracks being built there in 1898. The regiment participated in the Romanian War of Independence, fighting at the Grivitsa redoubt during the Siege of Plevna. The 16th Dorobanți Regiment "Baia" went on to participate in the Second Balkan War, and in the First World War, events that were described by Mihail Sadoveanu, who served as a soldier in the regiment, in his reports and in books such as 44 de zile in Bulgaria and Cocostârcul albastru. In 1918, it also fought in the Battle of Spătărești and helped disarm the Russian forces.

During the Second World War, the 16th Regiment fought in Bessarabia, Northern Bukovina, the Hertsa region and northwestern Transylvania, also taking part in the Siege of Odessa. After the war, the 16th Dorobanți Regiment merged with the 15th Dorobanți Regiment.

On 20 April 1932, Józef Piłsudski was named honorific commander of the unit during his visit. The 16th Dorobanți Regiment received the name "Józef Piłsudski", with the "JP" initials being added to the epaulettes of the soldiers.

== Decorations ==
The 634th Battalion has received the following decorations:

- Order of Military Virtue, Wartime (Knight – 2021)

== Gallery ==
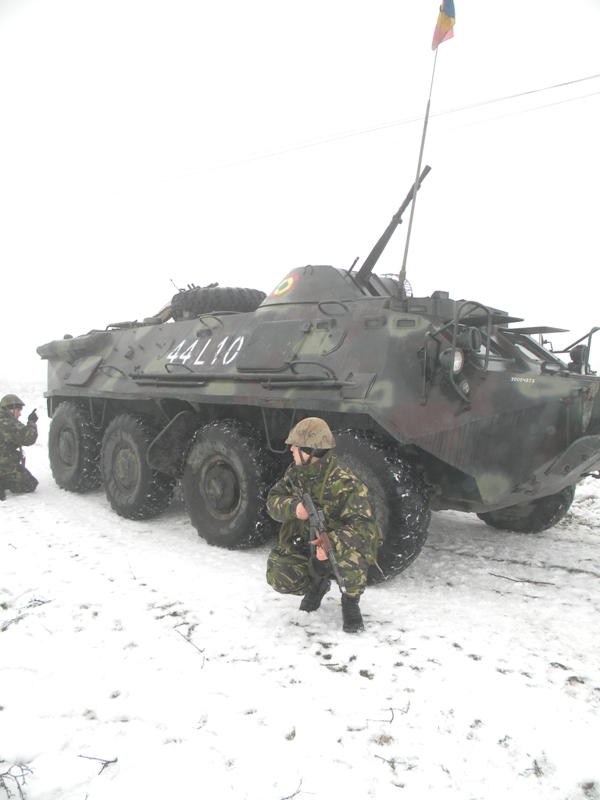
Soldiers from the 634th Infantry Battalion with a TAB-71, 2011

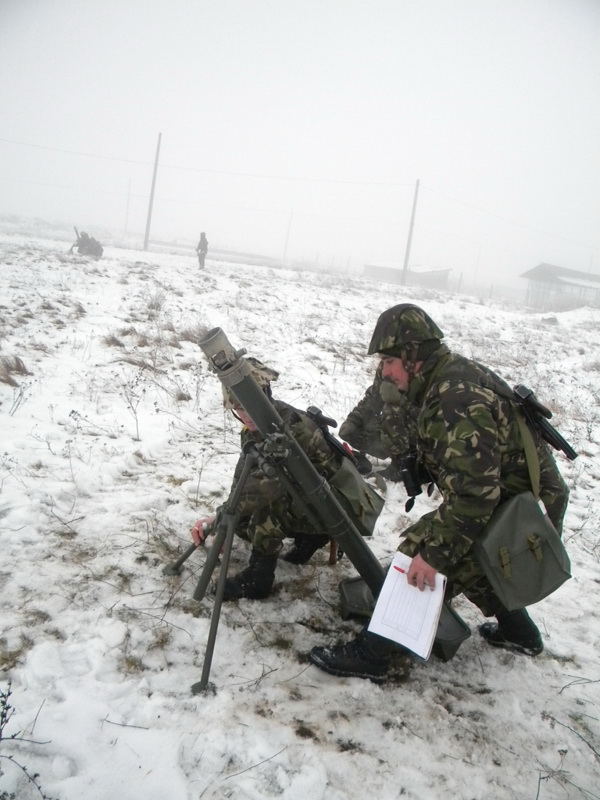
Mortar team of the battalion in 2011
