= Anti-Aircraft Missile Regiment "Dimitrie Cantemir" =

- Regimentul de rachete antiaeriene „Dimitrie Cantemir”
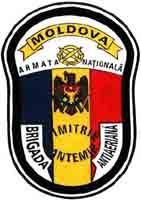
- The shoulder patch of the regiment.
- Active: 15 May 1992-Present
- Country: Moldova
- Branch: Air Force Command
- Type: Air defense
- Garrison/HQ: Durlești

Commanders
- Notable commanders: Colonel Ion Coropcean

Insignia
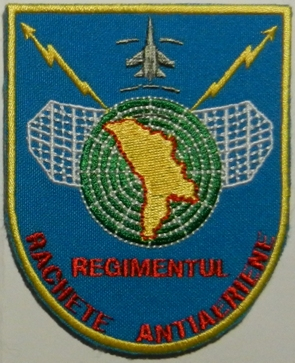
- Patch

The Anti-Aircraft Missile Regiment "Dimitrie Cantemir" (Romanian: Regimentul de rachete antiaeriene „Dimitrie Cantemir”) is an aerial defense formation of the Moldovan Air Force, based in the village of Durlești. It has the mission to supervise and defend the airspace of the Republic of Moldova. Both conscripts and contract soldiers serve in the regiment. In addition, 35 women serving in its ranks.

It is named after Dimitrie Cantemir, a Moldavian soldier and statesman who twice served as voivode of Moldavia (March–April 1693 and 1710–1711).

== History ==
The regiment was created in May 1992 and took an oath of allegiance to the Republic that month. It was then the size of a brigade. The month before, the brigade had taken up combat duty during the Transnistria War. On 3 September 1993, the 275th Guards Anti-Aircraft Rocket Brigade of the Soviet 60th Air Defense Corps was reorganized into the brigade. By 2011, the Dimitrie Cantemir Brigade had become a regiment. It took part in 2017 in the efforts to liquidate the consequences of the natural disaster in Chisinau and Durlesti.

After the resignation of Defense Minister Pavel Creanga and the brigade commander Iurie Bradu, the Moldovan air defense systems are entering a steep peak and are falling into moral and technical decline.

== Commanders ==
- Colonel Grigory Spinu (1992–1995)
- Colonel Ion Coropcean (1995–1996)
- Colonel Yuri Bradu (1996–1998)
- Colonel Valeri Zatik (1998–2002)

== See also ==
- 50th Anti-Aircraft Missile Regiment (Romania)
- Joint CIS Air Defense System
