= 61st Mountain Troops Brigade =

61st Mountain Troops Brigade "General Virgil Bădulescu"
- Brigada 61 Vânători de munte "General Virgil Bădulescu"
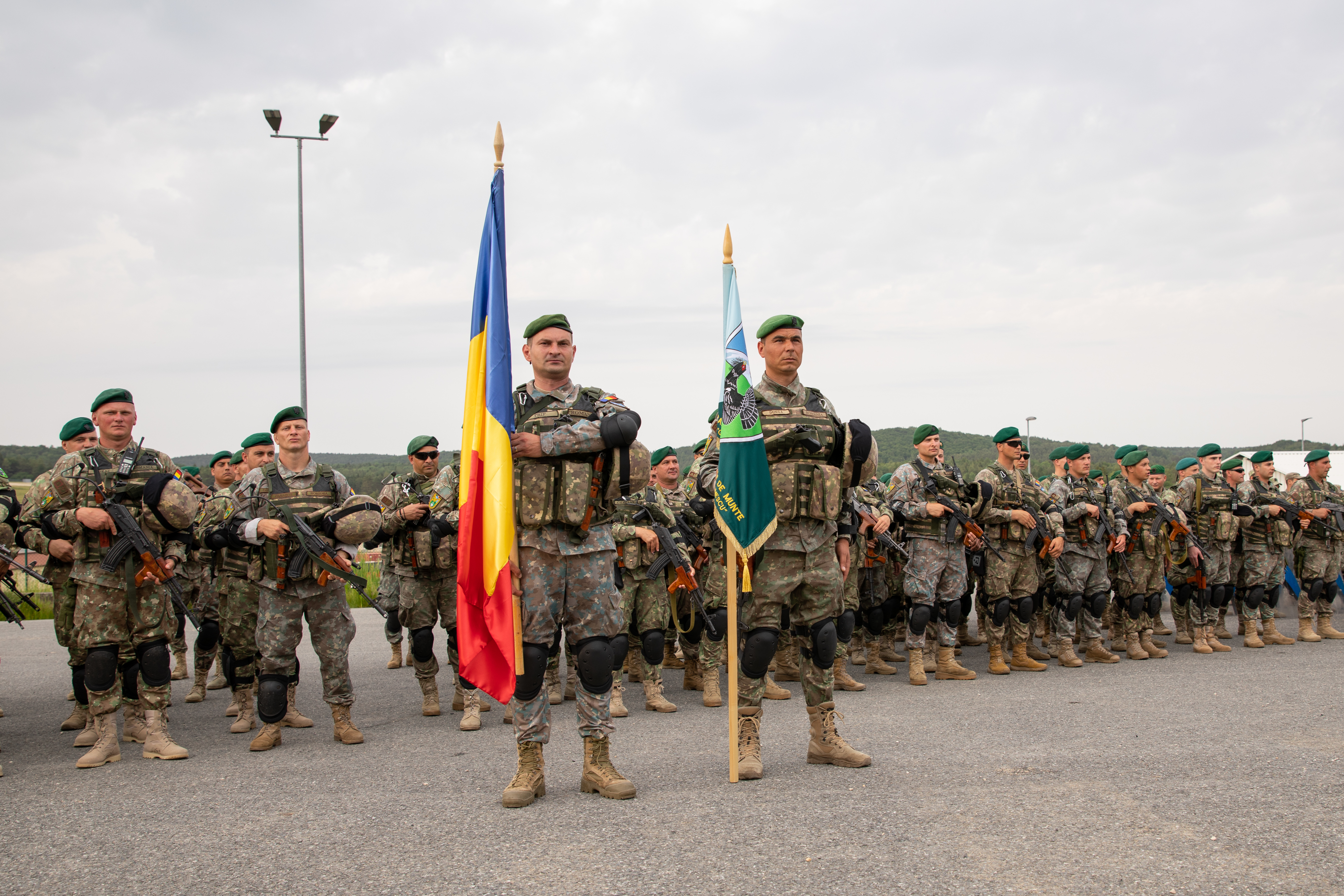
- Troops from the 24th Mountain Troops Battalion at the Hohenfels Training Area
- Active: October 1991 – present
- Country: Romania
- Branch: Romanian Land Forces
- Type: Mountain Troops
- Role: Cold-weather warfare Mountain warfare
- Size: 6 battalions + other supporting companies
- Part of: 4th Infantry Division "Gemina"
- Garrison/HQ: Miercurea Ciuc, Romania
- Anniversaries: 1 July
- Engagements: Afghanistan War

Commanders
- Current commander: Brigadier General Cristian Cristescu

Insignia
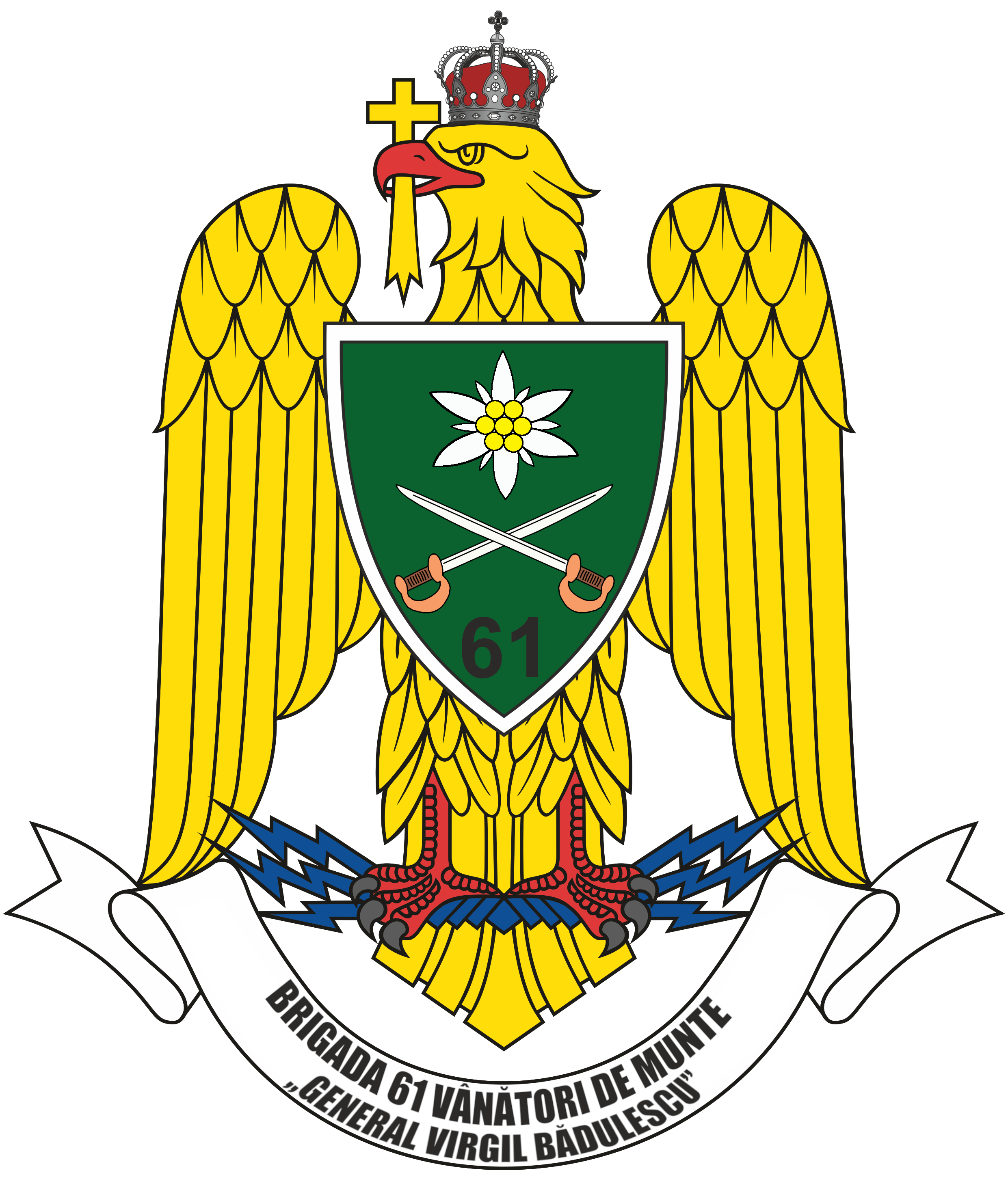
- Coat of Arms

The 61st Mountain Troops Brigade "General Virgil Bădulescu" (Brigada 61 Vânători de Munte) is a mountain troops brigade of the Romanian Land Forces. It was formed in October 1991. The brigade is currently subordinated to the 4th Infantry Division and its headquarters are located in Miercurea Ciuc. The Hippo Company currently subordinated to the brigade headquarters, is the only Pack animal unit still in service in the Romanian Armed Forces. The Hucul pony is used to transport military equipment and supplies across rugged mountainous terrain.

== Organization ==
Organization in 2026:

- 61st Mountain Troops Brigade "Virgil Bădulescu", in Miercurea Ciuc
  - 17th Mountain Troops Battalion "Dragoș Vodă", in Vatra Dornei, with Otokar Cobra II
  - 22nd Mountain Troops Battalion "Cireșoaia", in Sfântu Gheorghe, with Otokar Cobra II
  - 24th Mountain Troops Battalion "General Gheorghe Avramescu", in Miercurea Ciuc, with Otokar Cobra II
  - 385th Artillery Battalion "Iancu de Hunedoara", in Odorheiu Secuiesc
  - 468th Anti-aircraft Artillery Battalion "Trotuș", in Lunca de Sus
  - 435th Logistic Support Battalion "Ciuc", in Miercurea Ciuc
  - 415th CBRN Defence Company
  - 429th Reconnaissance Company
  - 440th Support Company
  - 444th Engineer Company
  - Communications and Information Technology Company
  - Hippo Company (Pack Animal)
  - Military Police Company

== Decorations ==
The 61st Mountain Troops Brigade has received the following decorations:

- Order of Military Virtue, Peacetime (Knight – 2016; Officer – 2021)

== External links and References ==
- (in English) Official Site of the Romanian Land Forces
- (in Romanian) Official Site of the 4th Infantry Division
