= 81st Mechanized Brigade =

81st Mechanized Brigade "General Grigore Bălan"
- Romanian: Brigada 81 Mecanizată "General Grigore Bălan"
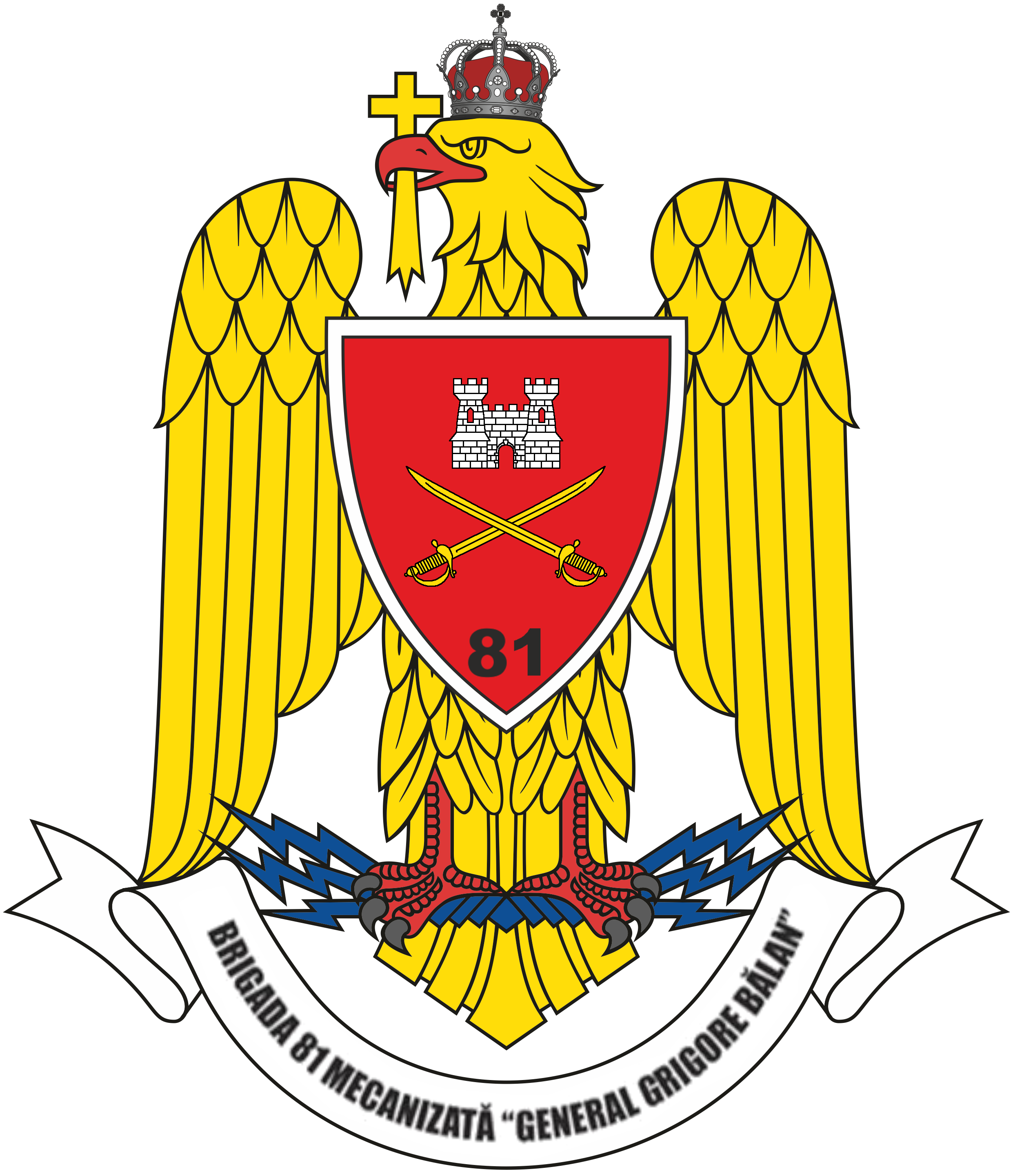
- Insignia of the 81st Mechanized Brigade "General Grigore Bălan"
- Active: 1 March 1995 – present
- Country: Romania
- Branch: Romanian Land Forces
- Type: Mechanized infantry
- Size: 8 battalions
- Part of: 4th Infantry Division "Gemina"; Rapid Forces Division (since 2017)
- Garrison/HQ: Bistrița
- Anniversaries: 1 March

Commanders
- Current commander: Colonel Ciprian Balica

The 81st Mechanised Brigade (Romanian: Brigada 81 Mecanizată "General Grigore Bălan") is a mechanised brigade of the Romanian Land Forces, established on 1 March 1995. The unit's headquarters are in Bistrița, and it is subordinated to the 4th Infantry Division "Gemina", with headquarters in Cluj-Napoca. It is named after Grigore Bălan, a brigadier general in World War II, who was killed in action during the liberation of Transylvania in 1944.

The unit was founded in Dej in September 1968, as a consequence of the decision of the Romanian leadership following the Warsaw Pact invasion of Czechoslovakia in August 1968. The 81st Mechanized Division became operational in September 1969. Between 1995 and 2000, the headquarters of the 81st Mechanised Brigade were located in Dej, and since December 2000 in Bistrița. The brigade became completely operational in April 2002 and as of 2024 is NATO certified.

== Organization ==
=== Organization in 1989 ===
Initially equipped with a limited number of T-34-85 tanks and transport trucks, the division would later receive T-55 tanks and wheeled armoured personnel carriers. In 1989 the unit had the following structure:

- 81st Mechanised Division "Someș" -Dej :
  - 221st Mech. Rgt. -Bistrita : with T-55/A tanks, TAB-71/71M apc-s, TABC-79 recon vehicles, SU-76 sp guns, ZiS-3 76mm field guns, Md.1982 120mm mortars, ?? TAB-71AR with 82mm mortars, AG-9 rr-s, MR-4 quad 14,5mm aa hmg-s, DAC-443T and −665T trucks, TER-580 evacuation tank, TERA-71L recovery apc-s,
  - 223rd Mech. Rgt. -Dej -same
  - 227th Mech. Rgt. -Cluj -with TR-85M tanks, MLI-84 ifv-s, TAB-71/-71M apc-s, TABC-79 recon vehicles, SU-76 sp guns, ZiS-3 76mm field guns, Md.1982 120mm mortars, ?? TAB-71AR with 82mm mortars, AG-9 rr-s, MR-4 quad 14,5mm aa hmg-s, DAC-443T and −665T trucks, TER-800 evacuation tank, TERA-71L recovery apc-s,
  - 230th Tank Rgt. -Baia Mare : with T-55/A/AM2 tanks, BTR-60PB and PU apc-s, BRDM-2 recon vehicles, MR-4 quad 14,5mm aa hmg-s, SR-114/-132, DAC-443T and −665T trucks, T-55T evacuation tanks, MTP-2/BTR-60 recovery apc-s,
  - 315th Artillery Regiment -Șimleu Silvaniei : with M-30 122mm how., Md.1981 152mm how., APR-40 122mm mrls, SR-114 and DAC-444 trucks, TMA-83 arty tractors, TAB-77A-PCOMA command vehicles,
  - 422nd Recon Battalion -Satu Mare : with TABC-79 recon vehicles and DAC-444T trucks,
  - 424th Communication Battalion -Dej :
  - 55th Antiaircraft Battalion -Dej :

=== Organization in 2026 ===
- 81st Mechanized Brigade "General Grigore Bălan", in Bistrița (aligned with the German Army's Rapid Forces Division)
  - Joint Peacekeeping Battalion
    - 191st Infantry Battalion "Colonel Radu Golescu", in Arad, with Piranha V wheeled infantry fighting vehicles and Otokar Cobra II
  - 811th Infantry Battalion "Dej", in Dej, with Piranha V wheeled infantry fighting vehicles and Otokar Cobra II
  - 812th Infantry Battalion "Bistrița", in Bistrița, with Piranha V wheeled infantry fighting vehicles and Otokar Cobra II
  - 813th Infantry Battalion "Maramureș", in Baia Mare, with Piranha V wheeled infantry fighting vehicles
  - 817th Artillery Battalion "Petru Rareș", in Prundu Bârgăului, will be equipped with K9 Thunder self-propelled howitzers
  - 55th Anti-aircraft Defence Battalion "Someș", in Dej, with KP-SAM Chiron
  - 405th Logistic Support Battalion "Năsăud", in Bistrița
  - 815th Support Battalion "Rodna", in Bistrița, with
    - 361st Communications and Information Technology Company
    - 365th Reconnaissance Company, with PPE PGSR-3i "Beagle"
    - 383rd CBRN Defence Company
    - 420th Support Company
    - 421st Military Police Company
    - 462nd Combat Support Engineer Company

== International Missions ==
- Between 1996 and 1998 the 812th Infantry Battalion participated to peacekeeping missions in Angola;
- The 191st, 811th and 812th Battalions participated since 2001 to peacekeeping missions in the Balkans (Kosovo and Bosnia and Herzegovina);
- Since 2003, the 811th and 812th Battalions participated to the Operation Enduring Freedom and ISAF in Afghanistan, as well as Operation Iraqi Freedom in Iraq.

== Decorations ==
The 81st Mechanized Brigade has received the following decorations:

- National Order of Faithful Service, Wartime (Knight – 2019)
- National Order of Merit, Wartime (Knight – 2014)
