= 69th Artillery Regiment (Romania) =

Romanian Artillery Regiment

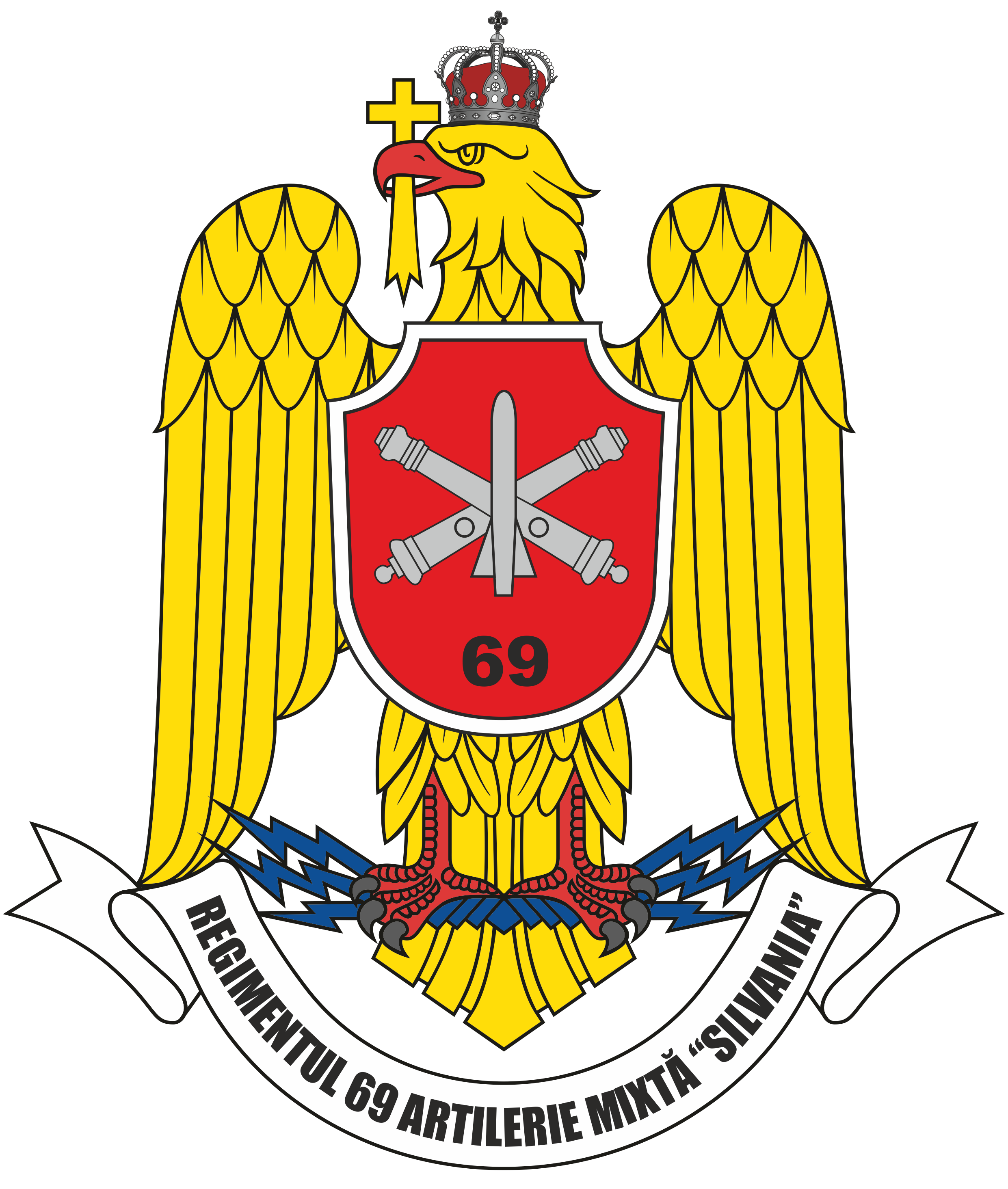
Coat of Arms of the 69th Artillery Regiment "Silvania"

The 69th Artillery Regiment Silvania (Regimentul 69 Artilerie) is an artillery regiment of the Romanian Land Forces formed on 15 August 1953. It is currently subordinated to the 4th Infantry Division and its headquarters are located in Șimleu Silvaniei.

== Structure ==
- 69th Artillery Regiment "Silvania" - Șimleu Silvaniei
  - 7th Multiple Rocket Launcher Battalion "General Vasile Danacu" - Florești, with APRA-40 multiple rocket launchers
  - Multiple Rocket Launcher Battalion - Șimleu Silvaniei, with LAROM multiple rocket launchers
  - Support Battalion - Șimleu Silvaniei

== Decorations ==
The 69th Artillery Regiment has received the following decorations:

- Order of Military Virtue, Peacetime (Knight – 2018)
