= Otokar Cobra =

Otokar Cobra I
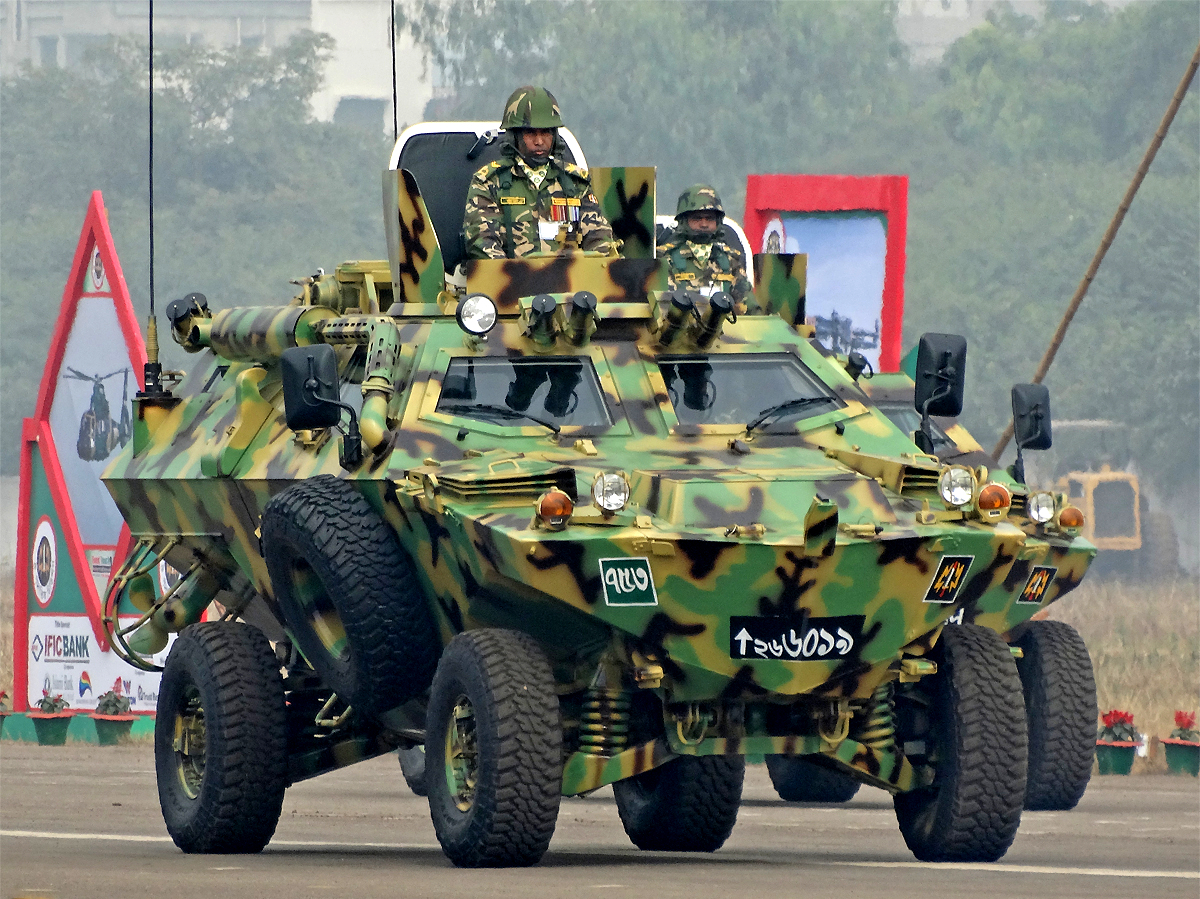
- A Bangladesh Armed Forces Cobra during its Armed Forces Day celebration
- Type: Infantry mobility vehicle with MRAP capabilities
- Place of origin: Turkey

Service history
- In service: 1997–present
- Used by: Operators
- Wars: War in Afghanistan (2001–2021); Russo-Georgian War; Kurdish–Turkish conflict; Boko Haram insurgency; Operation Euphrates Shield; Operation Olive Branch; Kosovo War

Production history
- Designer: Otokar
- Manufacturer: Otokar
- Developed into: Cobra II
- Variants: Configurable as Armoured Personnel Carrier, Anti-Tank Vehicle, Amphibious vehicle, Reconnaissance Vehicle, Ground Surveillance Radar Vehicle, Forward Observation Vehicle, Armoured Ambulance

Specifications
- Mass: 6,200 kg (13,700 lb)
- Length: 5.23 m (17.2 ft)
- Width: 2.22 m (7 ft 3 in)
- Height: 2.1 m (6 ft 11 in)
- Crew: 1+8
- Engine: 6.5 L, GM V8 diesel, water-cooled, turbocharged 190 hp
- Transmission: 4-speed automatic
- Suspension: Helical coil suspension
- Operational range: 752 km
- Maximum speed: 115 km/h (72 mph)

The Cobra (Turkish: Kobra) is a armoured tactical vehicle developed by Turkish firm Otokar. The vehicle has some subsystems from the Humvee. The Cobra is the first generation of the Cobra family of vehicles, a second generation named Otokar Cobra II is also produced.

== Durability ==
The monocoque steel v-hull provides protection against small arms fire, artillery shell shrapnel, and to a certain degree against anti-personnel and tank mines, and IEDs. Front wheel arches are designed to be blown away to free blast pockets. Otokar Cobras also have the option to be fitted with Q-Nets.

In December 2016, footage of a PKK attack against Turkish M-60 Sabra tanks circulated the Internet, showing the crew of a Cobra APC surviving a direct hit from a shoulder-launched, RPG-7 anti-tank rocket.

The Cobra vehicle forms a common platform which can be adapted for various roles and mission requirements including: armoured personnel carrier, anti-tank vehicle, reconnaissance vehicle, ground surveillance radar vehicle, forward observation vehicle, armoured ambulance, armoured command post, turreted vehicle for 12.7mm machine gun (turret produced by the Israeli firm Rafael), 20mm cannon, anti-tank missiles such as the TOW missile and Spike missiles or surface-to-air missiles.

Cobras can be used as amphibious combat vehicles. Turkish naval forces are currently looking for a new amphibious vehicle and the Cobra is listed among the candidates for acquisition.

== Operational history ==
=== Burkina Faso ===
A Burkinabe army vehicle was struck by an IED in the area of Kompienbiga, after hitting an IED laid by insurgents. The explosion overturned the vehicle, after which it caught fire; there were three killed and four wounded in the attack.

=== Georgia ===
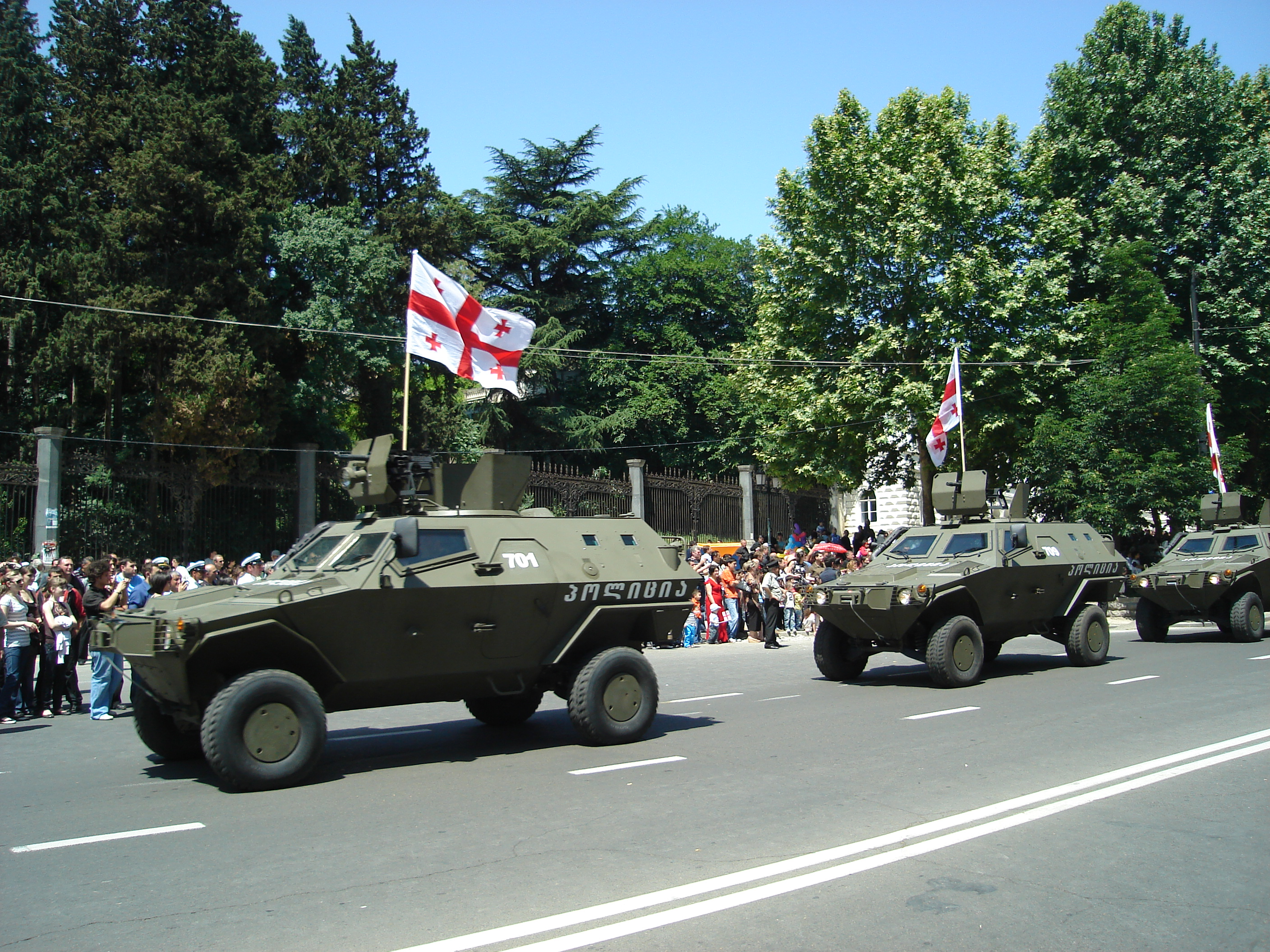
Otokar Cobras during the Independence Day of Georgia parade, May 2008

In the 2008 South Ossetia war, Cobra vehicles equipped with 12.7 mm NSV machine guns and 40 mm automatic grenade launchers were used by the special forces of the Georgian Ministry of Internal Affairs during their assault on the city in the Battle of Tskhinvali. One of the Cobras was destroyed and captured by the Russian army. Cobras were also used by Georgian UN forces in the Central African Republic.

=== Nigeria ===
The Nigerian military has deployed Cobras during operations against the Boko Haram insurgency in the north-east of the country since 2013.

=== Turkey ===
Cobras are actively being used by the Turkish Armed Forces within the country for anti-terrorism operations.

Cobras have shown to be highly resistant against most mine and IED attacks, with the crew surviving most incidents without any injuries. The increasing sophistication of IED use by the PKK and the loss of eight soldiers inside one on August 19, 2015, has prompted the Turkish Armed Forces to upgrade its fleet of armoured vehicles. This has, in part, led to additional orders for the improved Cobra II.

Cobras have also been used effectively by Turkish backed militias against ISIS and YPG during Operation Euphrates Shield.

Cobras were used by the Turkish Armed Forces as part of NATO's International Security Assistance Force and Resolute Support Mission in Afghanistan.

== Operators ==
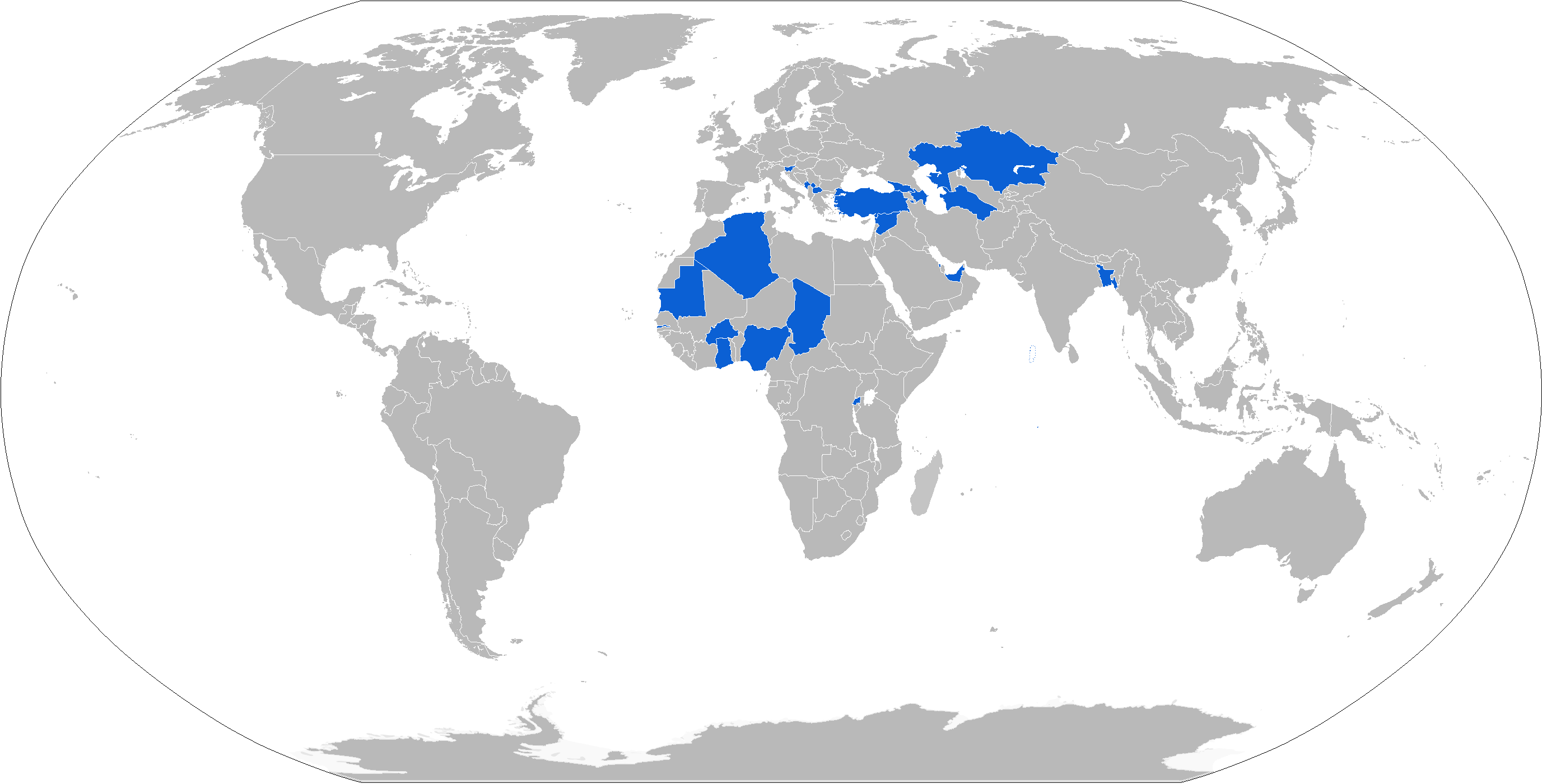
Map of Otokar Cobra I operators, in blue

- Algeria
- Azerbaijan
- Bahrain
- Bangladesh
- Burkina Faso
- Chad
- Gambia
- Georgia
- Ghana
- Kazakhstan
- Kosovo
- Maldives
- Mauritania
- Montenegro
- Nigeria: 194 Cobras.
- North Macedonia
- Pakistan
- Rwanda: 30 Cobras. Used in UN peacekeeping ops in the Central African Republic.
- Saudi Arabia
- Slovenia
- Syria
- Turkey
- Tunisia
- Turkmenistan — 100+ bought in the mid-2010s. Used by the State Border Service.
- United Arab Emirates
- United Nations

== Gallery ==
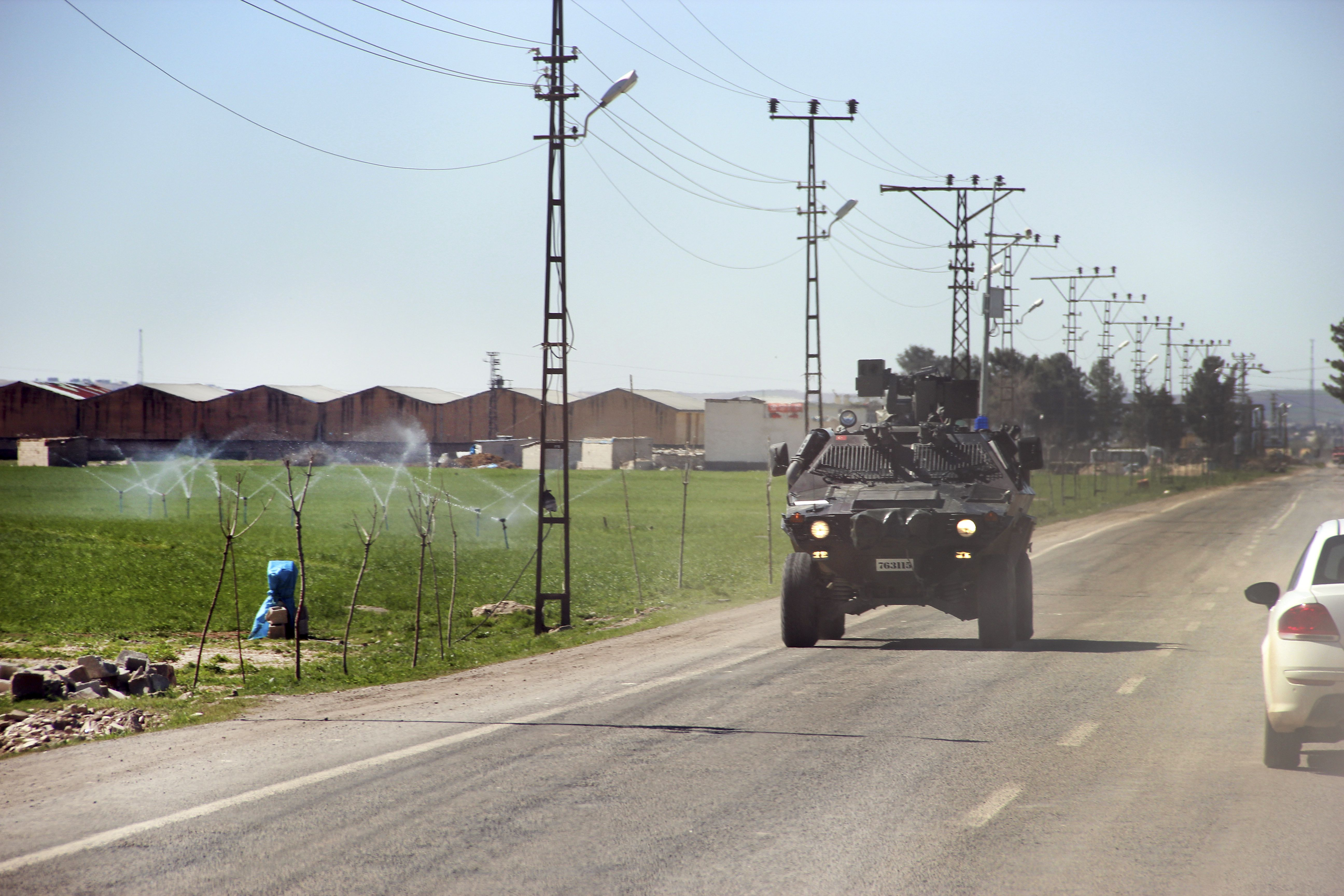
Turkish Cobra in Suruç

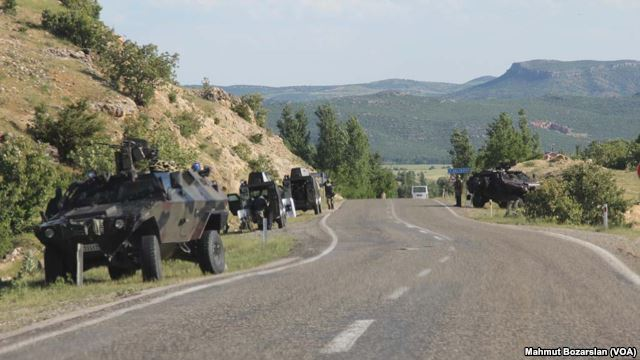
Turkish Cobra in south-eastern Turkey

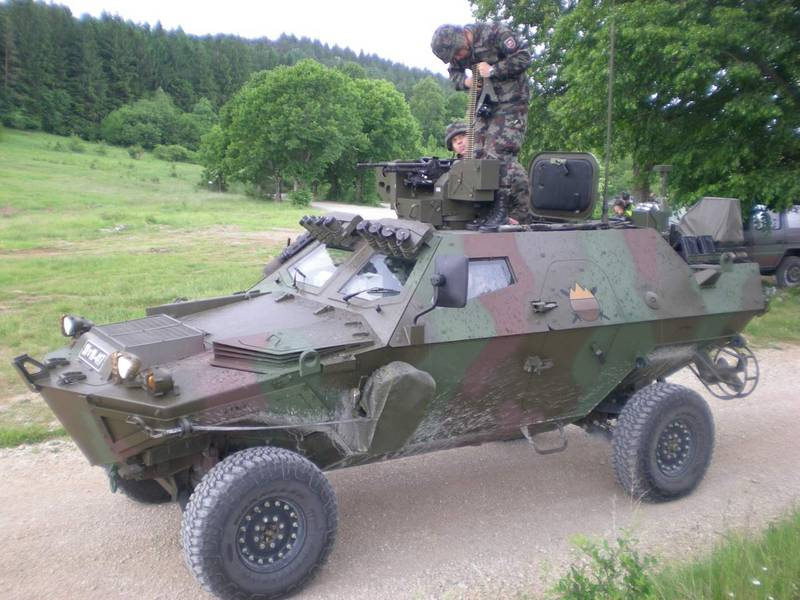
With the Slovenian Armed Forces

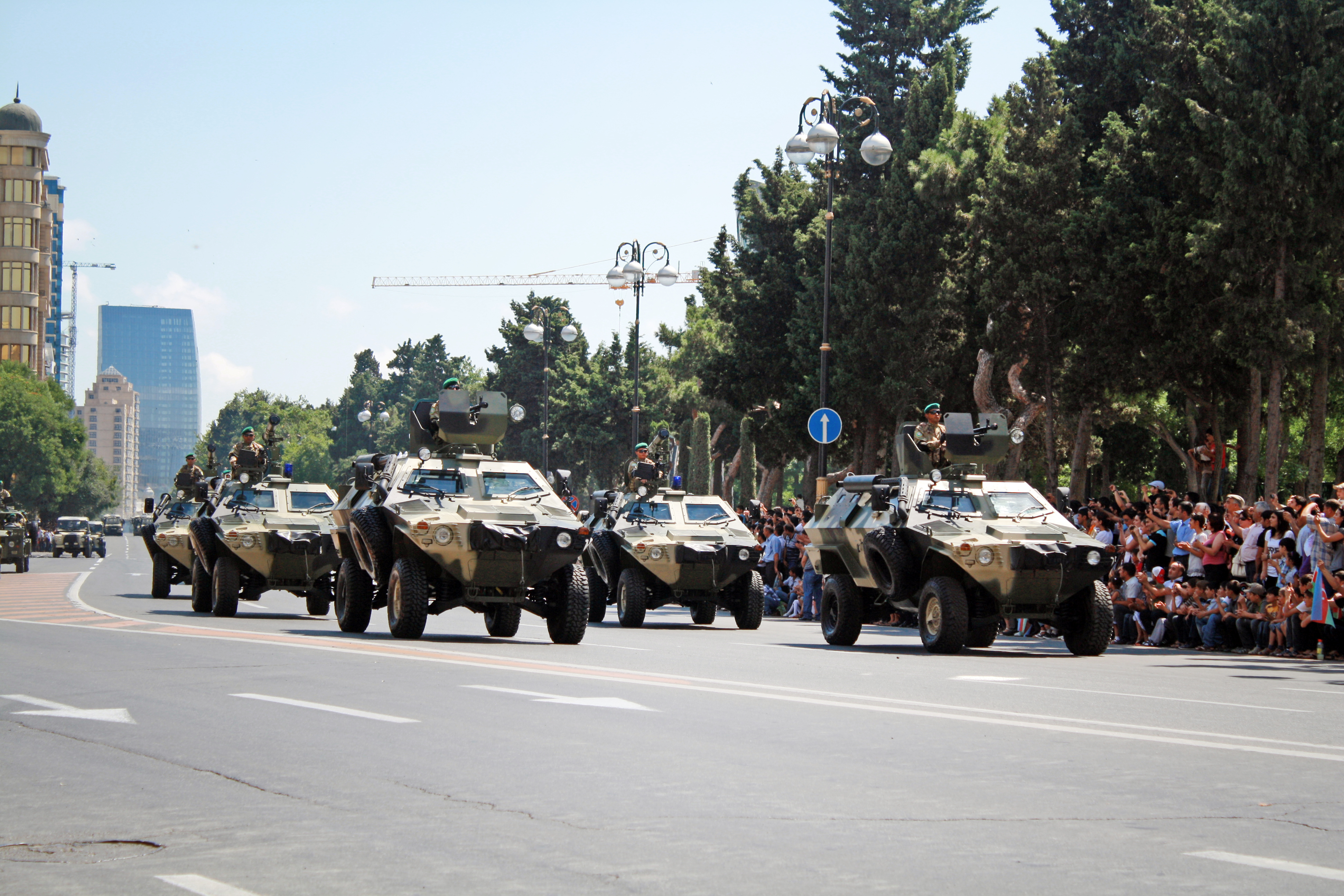
Otokar Cobras during 2011 Baku Military Parade

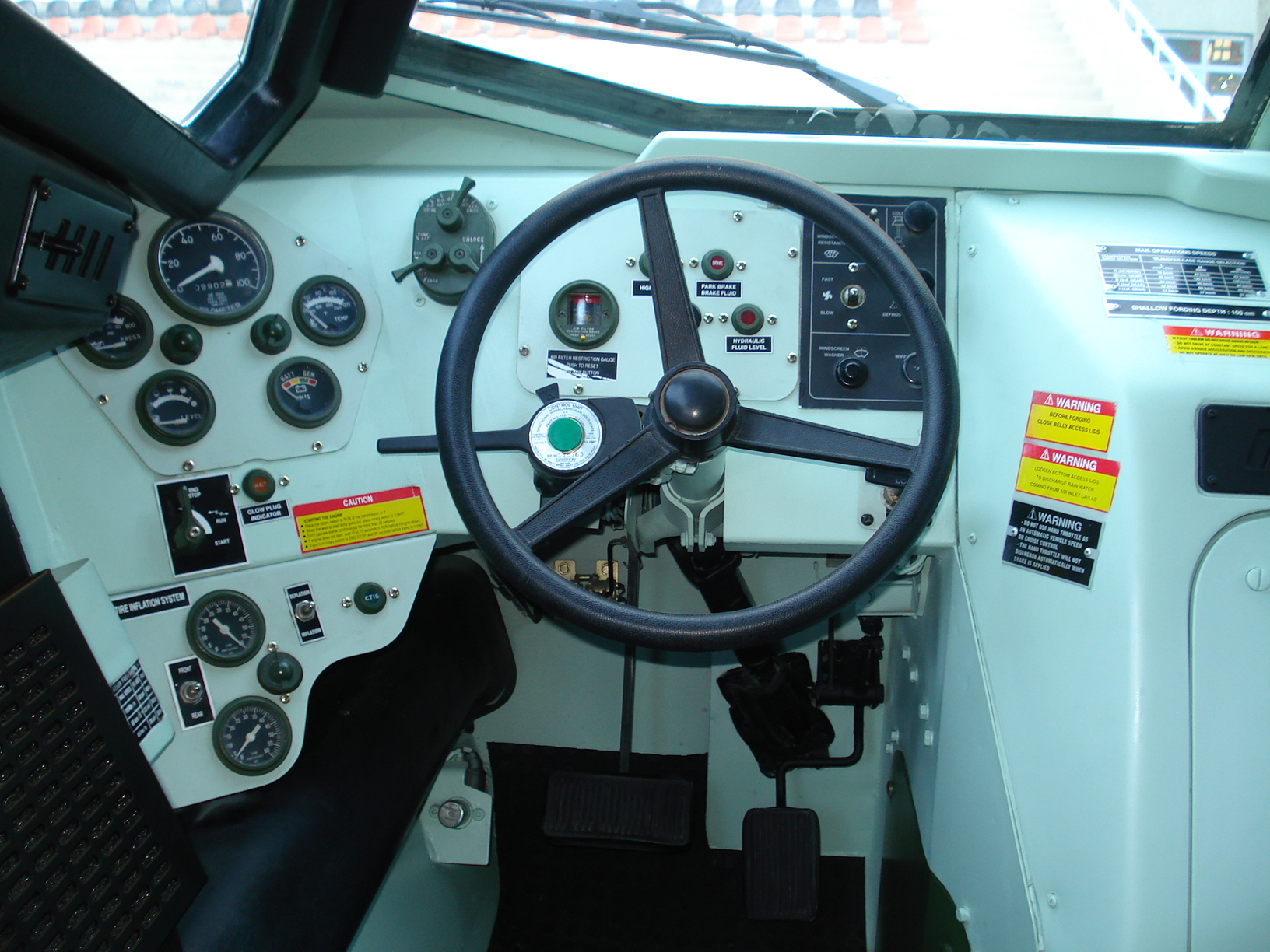
Cobra cockpit design

Macedonian Army Cobra 4x4

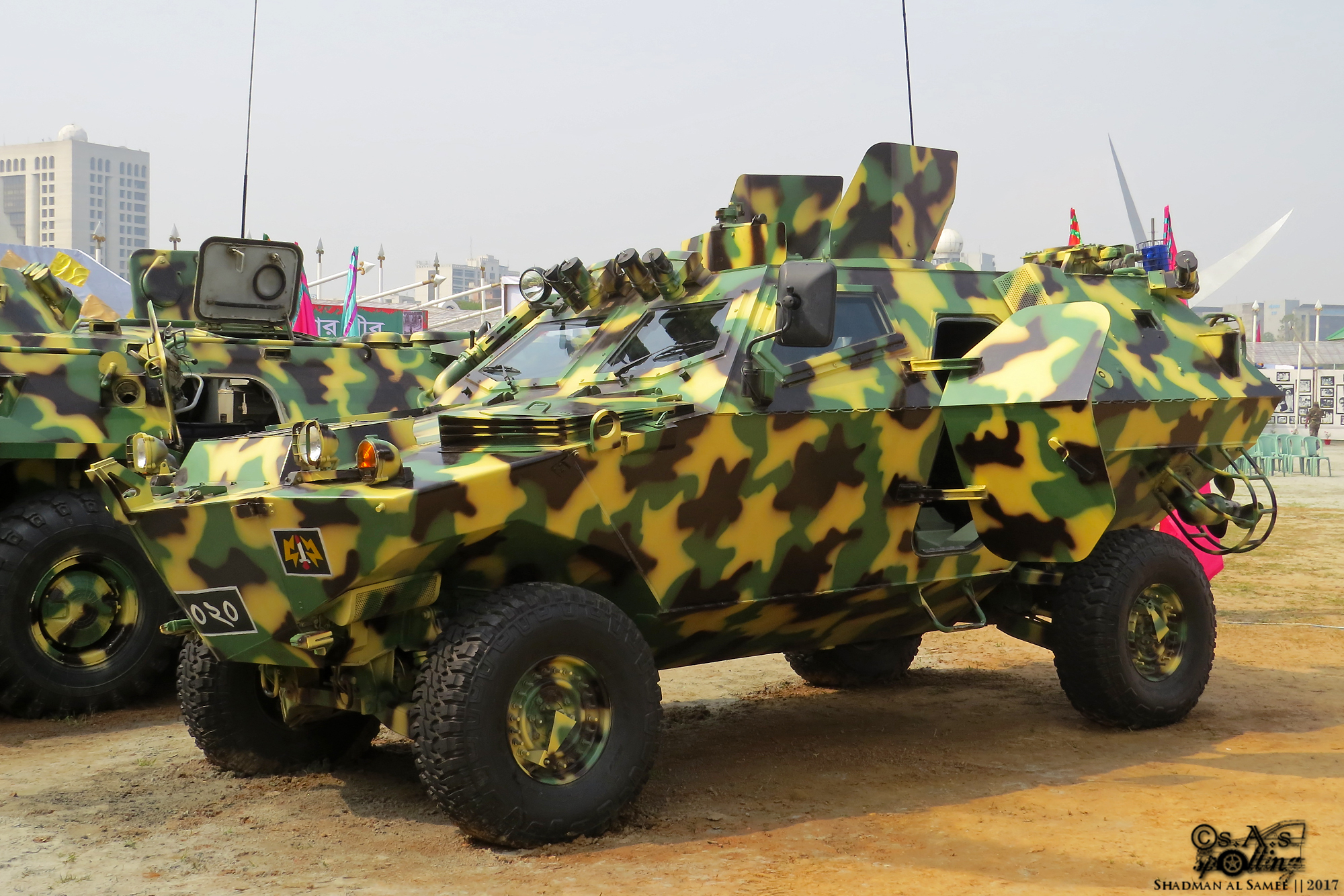
Otokar Cobra of Bangladesh Army

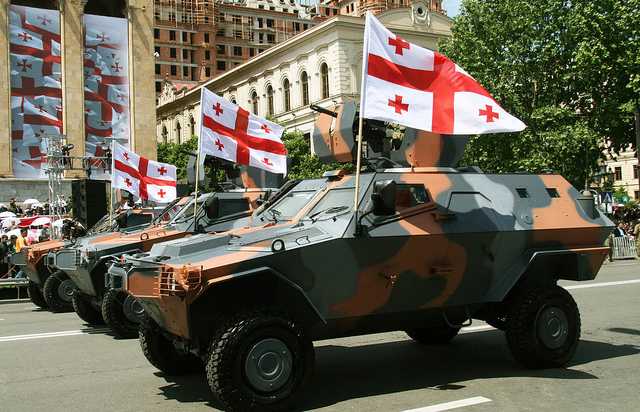
Georgian Otokar Kobra

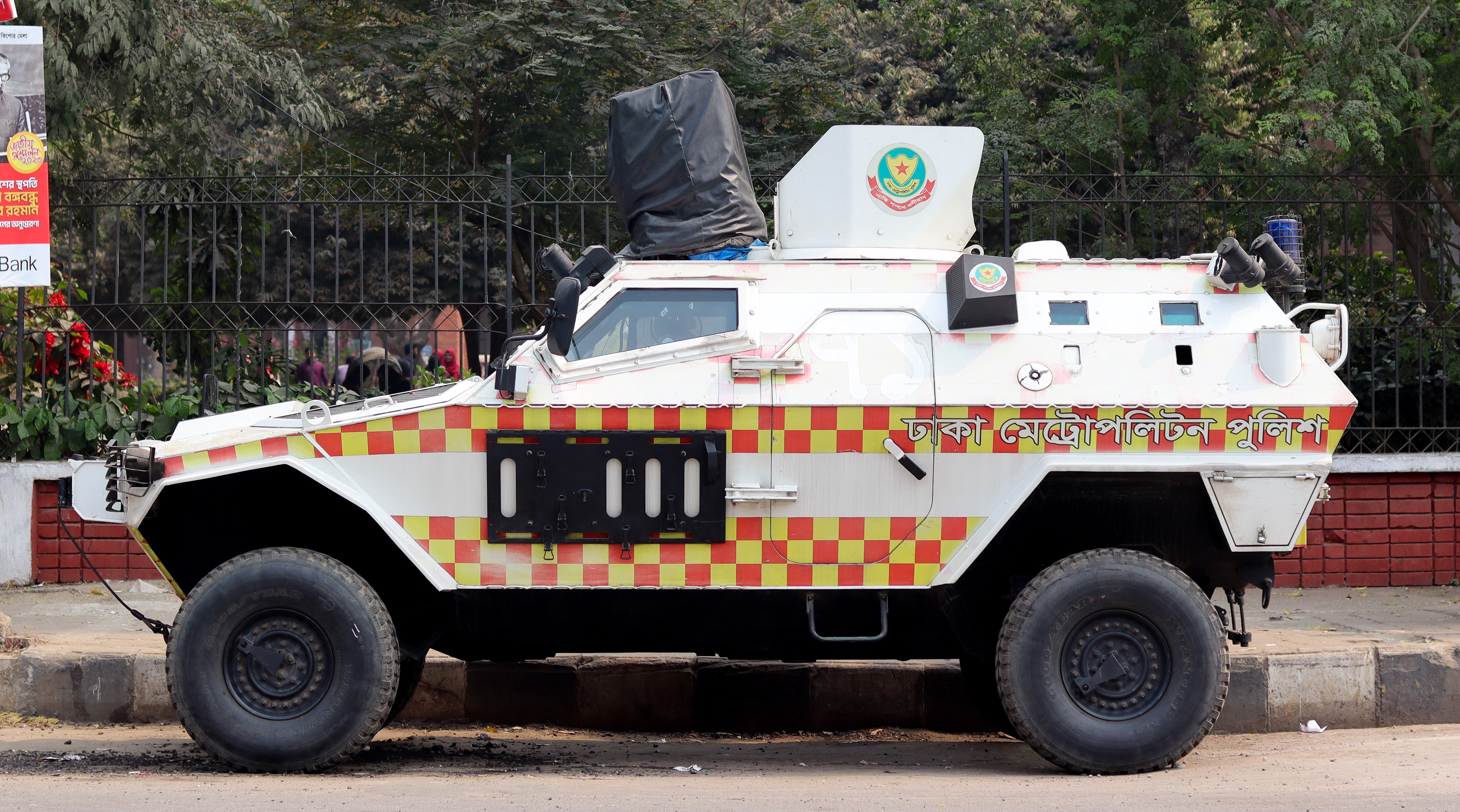
Otokar Cobra of Bangladesh Police

== See also ==
- Dozor-B of Ukraine
- Komatsu LAV of Japan
- MOWAG Eagle
- P2 (armoured vehicle) of Indonesia
- Véhicule Blindé Léger of France
- VN-4 of China
