= 50th Anti-Aircraft Missile Regiment (Romania) =

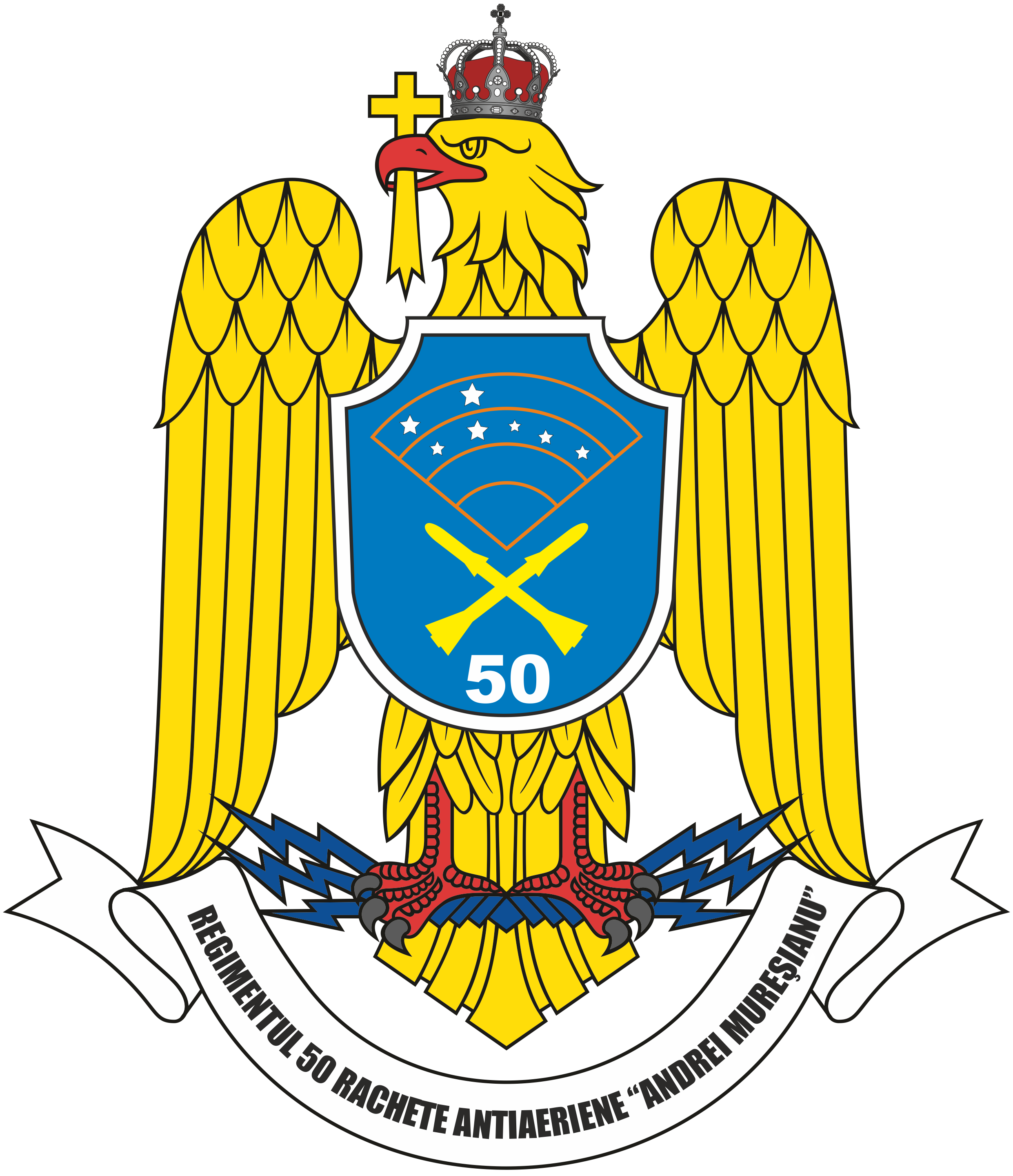
Insignia of the 50th Anti-aircraft Missiles Regiment

The 50th Anti-aircraft Missiles Regiment "Andrei Mureșianu" (Regimentul 50 Rachete Antiaeriene) is an air defence regiment of the Romanian Land Forces. It is currently subordinated to the 4th Infantry Division and its headquarters are located in Floreşti (near Cluj-Napoca). The regiment was part of the 6th Anti-aircraft Missiles Brigade, which was disbanded in 2006, during a reorganization of the Romanian Land Forces. The unit currently operates the CA-94 & KP-SAM Chiron MANPADS and CA-95 amphibious self-propelled anti-aircraft weapon.

== Decorations ==
The 50th Anti-Aircraft Missile Regiment has received the following decorations:

- Order of Military Virtue, Peacetime (Knight – 2016)
