= Grigore Bălan =

Romanian general

Brigadier-General Grigore Bălan
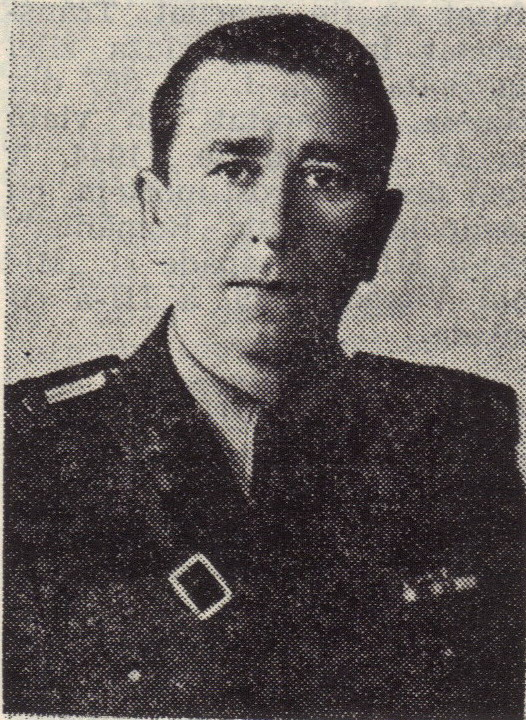
- General Grigore Bălan
- Born: 14 July 1896; Felsőbalázsfalva, Kingdom of Hungary (now in Șintereag, Romania)
- Died: 13 September 1944 (aged 48); Sinaia, Kingdom of Romania
- Burial place: Ghencea Cemetery, Bucharest, Romania
- Military career
- Allegiance: Kingdom of Romania
- Branch: Army
- Commands: 5th Mountain Group; 2nd Mountain Division
- Conflicts: World War II; Eastern Front; Battle of Turda
- Awards: Order of Michael the Brave, 3rd Class; Order of the Star of Romania, Commander rank

Grigore Bălan (July 14, 1896 – September 13, 1944) was a Romanian brigadier general during World War II.

Bălan was born in Felsőbalázsfalva, a village in Beszterce-Naszód County, Kingdom of Hungary, now Blăjenii de Sus, Bistrița-Năsăud County, Romania. He attended the Infantry School for Officers in Bucharest, graduating as second lieutenant in 1915. He fought in World War I, advancing to the rank of lieutenant by 1918. During the interwar period, he was promoted to captain (1921), major (1929), lieutenant-colonel (1936), and colonel (1940).

He served as commanding officer of the 5th Mountain Group from September 1940 to February 1943. In February 1942 he was awarded the Order of Michael the Brave, 3rd Class, for bravery during the battle of Mala Bilozerka (September 25–October 2, 1941). In July 1943 he became Deputy General Officer Commanding of the 2nd Mountain Division before being made its commanding officer in June 1944. In January 1944 he was awarded the Order of the Star, Commander rank.

After coup d'état of August 23, 1944, Romania switched sides and declared war on Nazi Germany. On September 9, 1944, while fighting at the siege of Sfântu Gheorghe during the Battle of Turda, Bălan was mortally wounded by a German shell at Arcuș; he succumbed from his wounds four days later, at a military hospital in Sinaia. He was buried with military honors at the Ghencea Military Cemetery in Bucharest.

To perpetuate Bălan's memory, a boulevard in Sfântu Gheorghe was named after him, and a cross was erected in Arcuș on the spot where he fell seriously injured. A street in Bistrița also bears his name. In 1992, a bust was built in the courtyard of the Command of the 1st Vânători de munte Brigade from Bistrița, which has since been renamed the 81st Mechanized Brigade "General Grigore Bălan".
