= Otokar Cobra II =

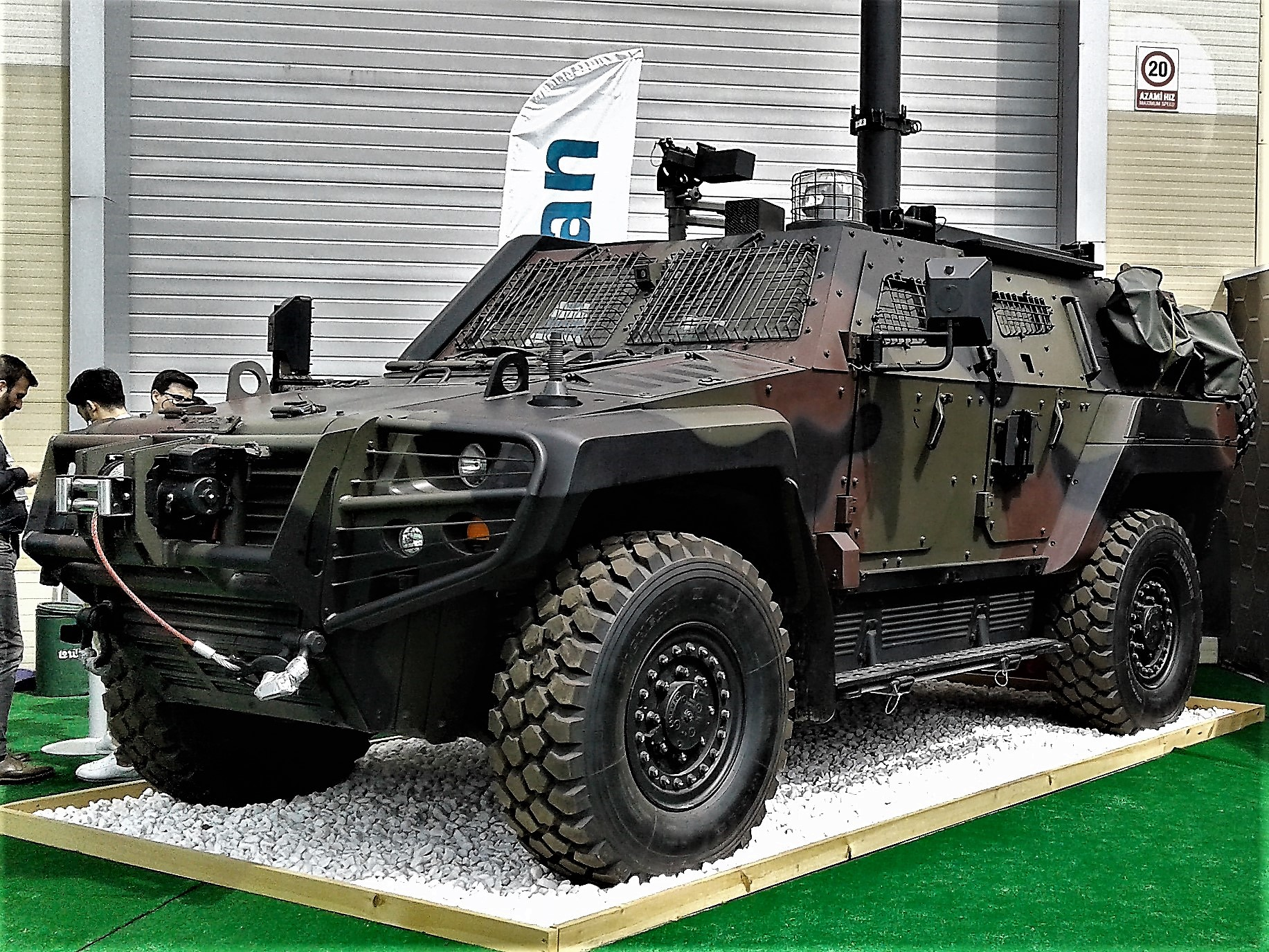
- Otokar Cobra II at the IDEF 2019
- Type: Infantry mobility vehicle with MRAP capabilities
- Place of origin: Turkey

Service history
- In service: 2013–present
- Used by: Operators
- Wars: Kurdish–Turkish conflict Syrian civil war Russian invasion of Ukraine

Production history
- Designer: Otokar
- Manufacturer: Otokar
- Developed from: Cobra I

Specifications
- Mass: 12,000 kg (26,000 lb)
- Length: 5.6 m (18 ft)
- Width: 2.5 m (8 ft 2 in)
- Height: 2.2 m (7 ft 3 in)
- Crew: 2+8
- Engine: 6.7L, six-cylinder, water cooled, turbo charged, common rail, diesel engine 281 hp
- Transmission: 6-speed automatic (6 forward + 1 reverse)
- Suspension: Helical coil suspension
- Operational range: 700 km (430 mi)
- Maximum speed: 110 km/h (68 mph)

The Cobra II (Turkish: Kobra II), a further development of the earlier Cobra I model, is an armoured tactical vehicle designed and produced by Turkish company Otokar. Cobra II is a 4x4 wheeled armoured vehicle and has a capacity for maximum ten personnel including the driver and the commander. It features high level of protection against threats from improvised explosive devices and land mines. Among its various functions are security and peacekeeping operations and border protection. The personnel carrier can be produced in different versions, according to different security requirements of the user thanks to its modular design.

== Overview ==
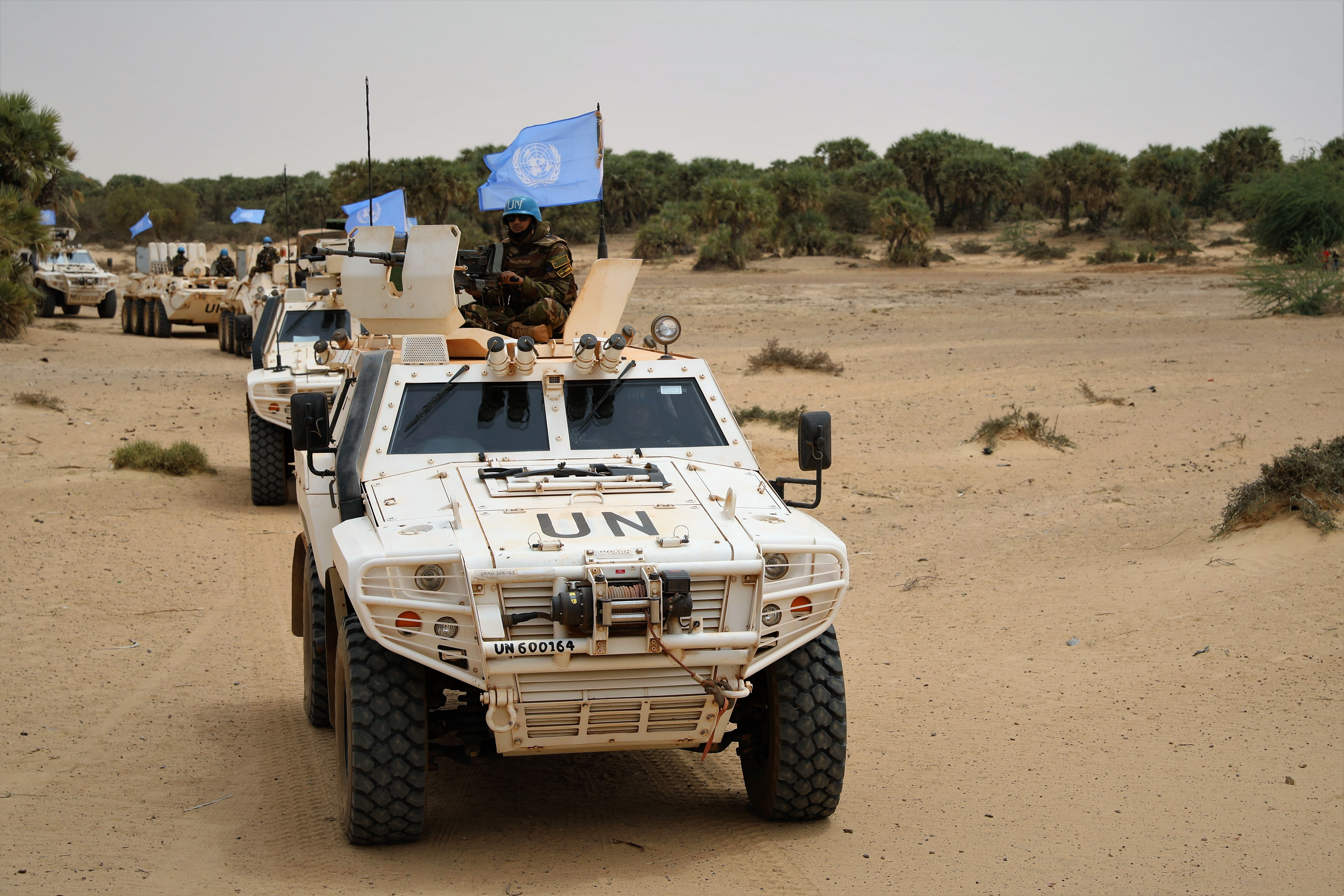
Bangladeshi peacekeepers in Mali with Cobra II vehicles

The tactical personnel carrier's overall length is 5.6 m (18 ft) with its width 2.5 m (8 ft 2 in) and height 2.2 m (7 ft 3 in). Run flat, CTIS, air conditioning system, blackout lighting system and towing eye are among the standard equipment of the vehicle. It can be additionally fitted with a self-recovery winch, a CBRN filtration kit, automatic fire extinguishing system, navigation system, intercom system and an auxiliary power unit. It can be optionally equipped with a remote controlled weapon system (RCWS) of up to 30 mm machine gun or grenade launcher.

It serves in the Turkish Armed Forces and security forces. It is also used by several other countries as well as by the United Nations in peacekeeping missions. It was presented for the first time in May 2013.

First unveiled at IDEF 2013, the Cobra II is a more heavily armoured successor to the Cobra. The Cobra II has a combat weight that is roughly double that of its predecessor and is slightly wider, longer and taller.

Standard equipment includes rear view camera, thermal front camera, air conditioning system, blackout lighting system, multi-point seat belts, radio provisions, and a towing eye. It can be optionally equipped with a self-recovery winch, nuclear, biological and chemical filtration kit, automation fire extinguishing system, intercom system, navigation system and an auxiliary power unit. In an APC configuration, the vehicle can carry nine personnel and can be armed with a number of different weapons, including crew-operated machine guns and remote weapon stations armed with short-range surface-to-air missiles and grenade launchers. The vehicle also has an amphibious variant.

Cobra II is powered by a 6.7L, six-cylinder, water cooled, turbo charged, common rail, diesel engine mated to an automatic gearbox (six forward and one reverse). It produces a power of 360 hp (269 kW) at 2,650rpm, and torque of 1100Nm at 1,400rpm. The engine is also compatible with F-34 and F-54 fuel. It has a maximum speed of 110 km/h (68 mph) and can operate in range of 700 km (430 mi).

== Operational history ==
=== Turkey ===
The first orders for the Cobra II were received from an undisclosed customer, and from the Turkish Armed Forces. In late 2015, the Turkish Armed Forces ordered 82 Cobra II vehicles plus related systems, maintenance and support worth $52 million. In June 2016, the Turkish Armed Forces ordered an undisclosed number of Cobra II vehicles plus related systems, maintenance and support worth $120.8 million. Assuming the same value to vehicle ratio as the 2015 order, this would imply an order of about 180 vehicles.

In 2017, the Turkish Army deployed Cobra II vehicles on the Turkish-Syrian border. Those Cobra IIs were equipped with radar, a target detection system and thermal camera system and were seen patrolling security wall on the border.

=== Bangladesh ===
Received 22 Cobra IMV in 2007–2008, 22 in 2013, and 67 Cobra II MRAP in 2017–2018.

=== Ukraine ===
In May 2023 a video was posted on social media showing several Cobra II vehicles in use by the Ukrainian Armed Forces. A rail transport of Cobra II, assumed to be intended for Ukraine, was previously spotted in Romania in April 2023. The MEDEVAC variant of the Cobra II was first seen in use by the Ukrainian forces during the 2024 Kursk offensive.

=== Romania ===
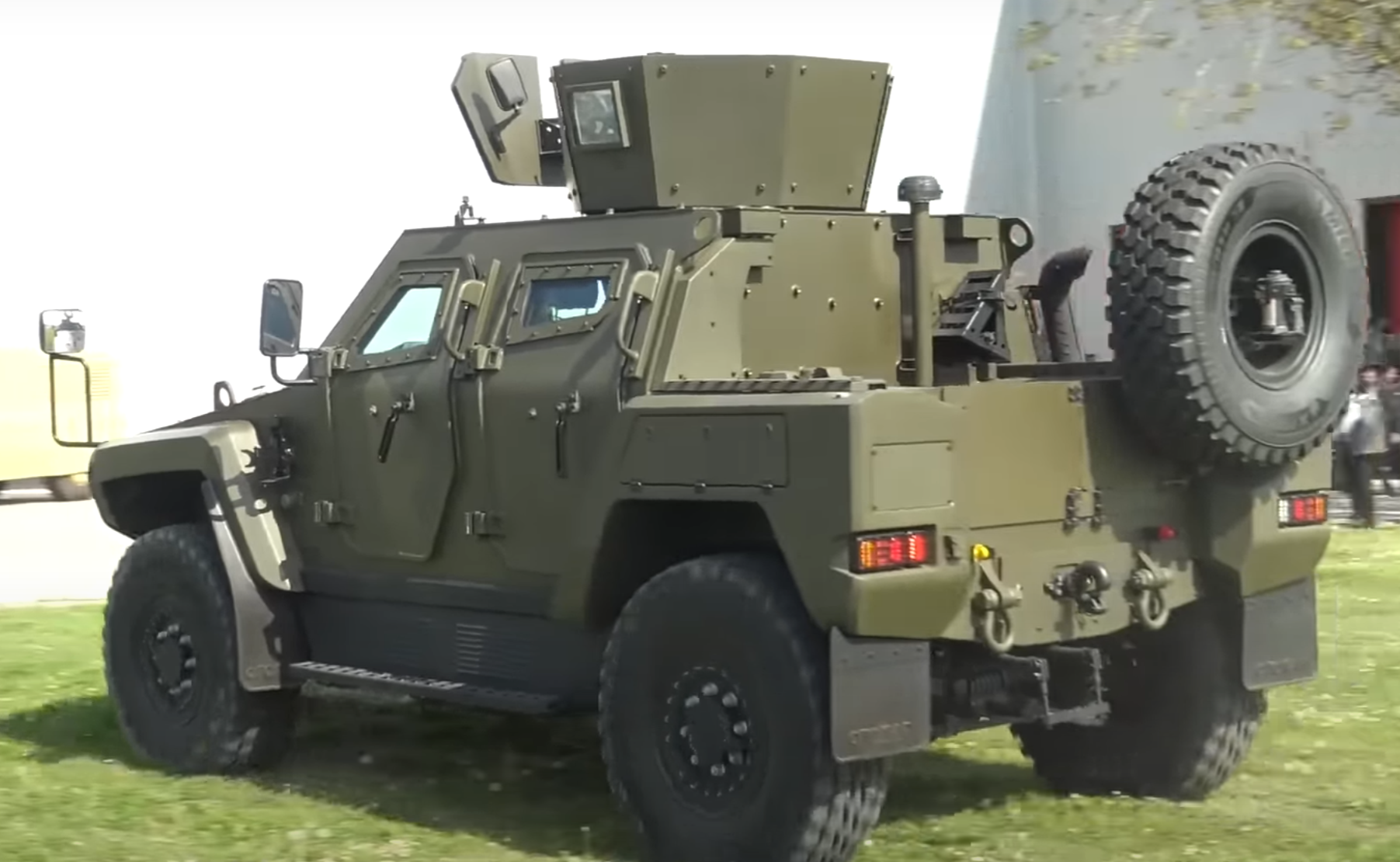
Rear view of the Romanian pickup variant Cobra II

The Cobra II won the contract tender for supplying 1,059 vehicles in nine configurations for the Romanian Armed Forces as part of the light armored tactical type vehicles (ATBTU) program. The configurations include CBRN, engineering, MEDEVAC, anti-tank with Spike missiles, and mortar carrier variants. Of these, 881 will be for the Land Forces, 22 for the Air Force, 16 for the Naval Forces, 51 for the Special Forces, 49 for the Logistics Command, and 40 for the General Staff. The total cost of the contract is around $934 million. The first 278 vehicles are to be produced in Turkey while the rest will be produced in Romania by Sisteme Apărare România (SAROM), a joint venture company founded by Otokar and Automecanica SA in Mediaș. A Cobra II fitted with a Romanian Pro Optica Anubis RCWS was previously presented at the Black Sea Defense & Aerospace 2024 exposition.

To fit the Romanian weight requirement of less than 10,500 kg (23,100 lb), the Cobra II was modified to carry only six occupants instead of 11 while also converted into a pickup.

In 2026, the Romanian Army deployed the Cobra II in Bosnia and Herzegovina, as part of the European Union Force (EUFOR).

== Operators ==
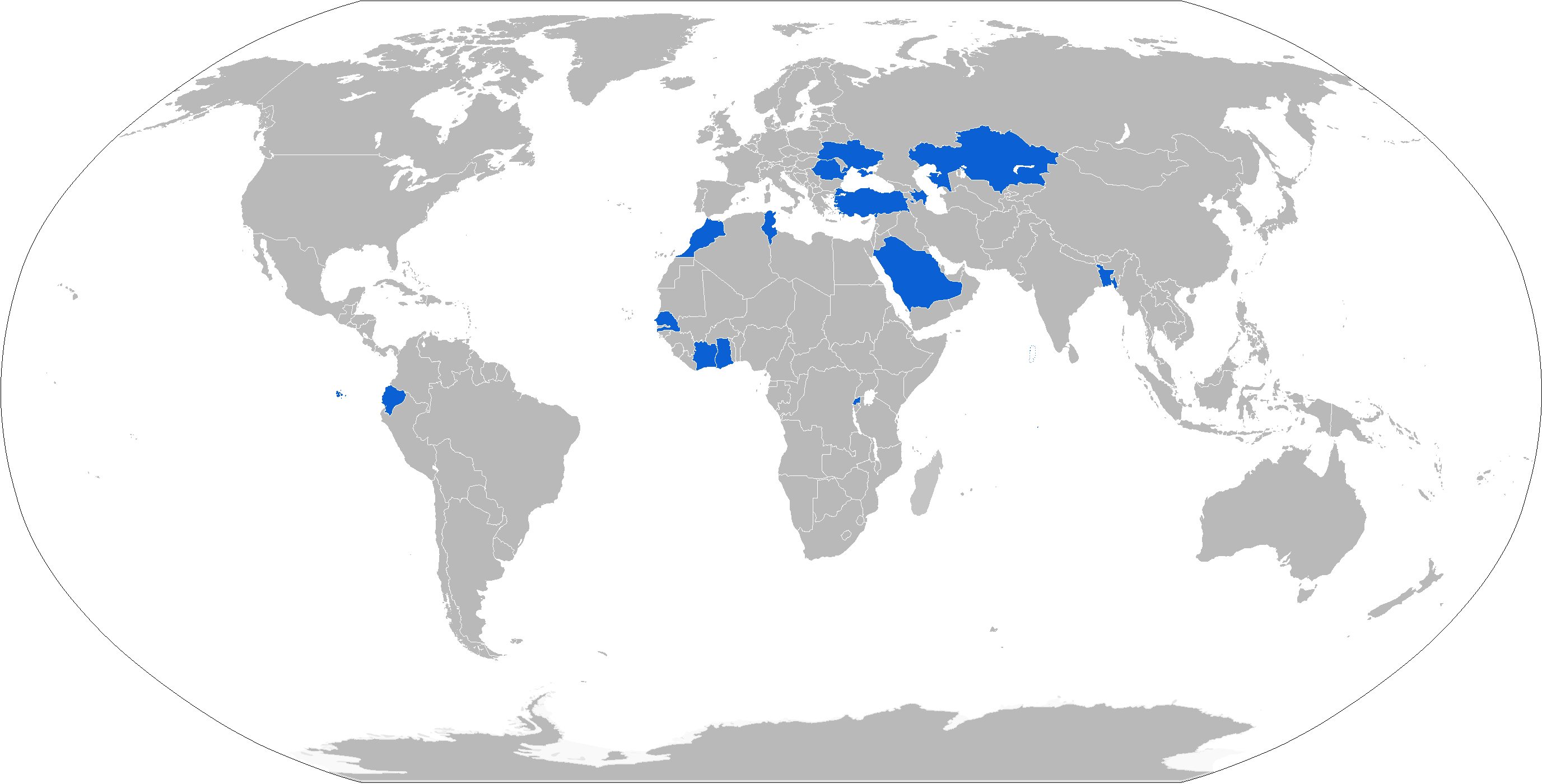
Map of Otokar Cobra II operators, in blue

- Azerbaijan
- Bangladesh
- Ecuador
- Ghana
- Ivory Coast
- Kazakhstan
- Morocco
- Pakistan
- Romania – 1,059 vehicles on order
- Rwanda
- Saudi Arabia
- Senegal
- Tunisia
- Turkey
- Ukraine
- Syria

== Gallery ==
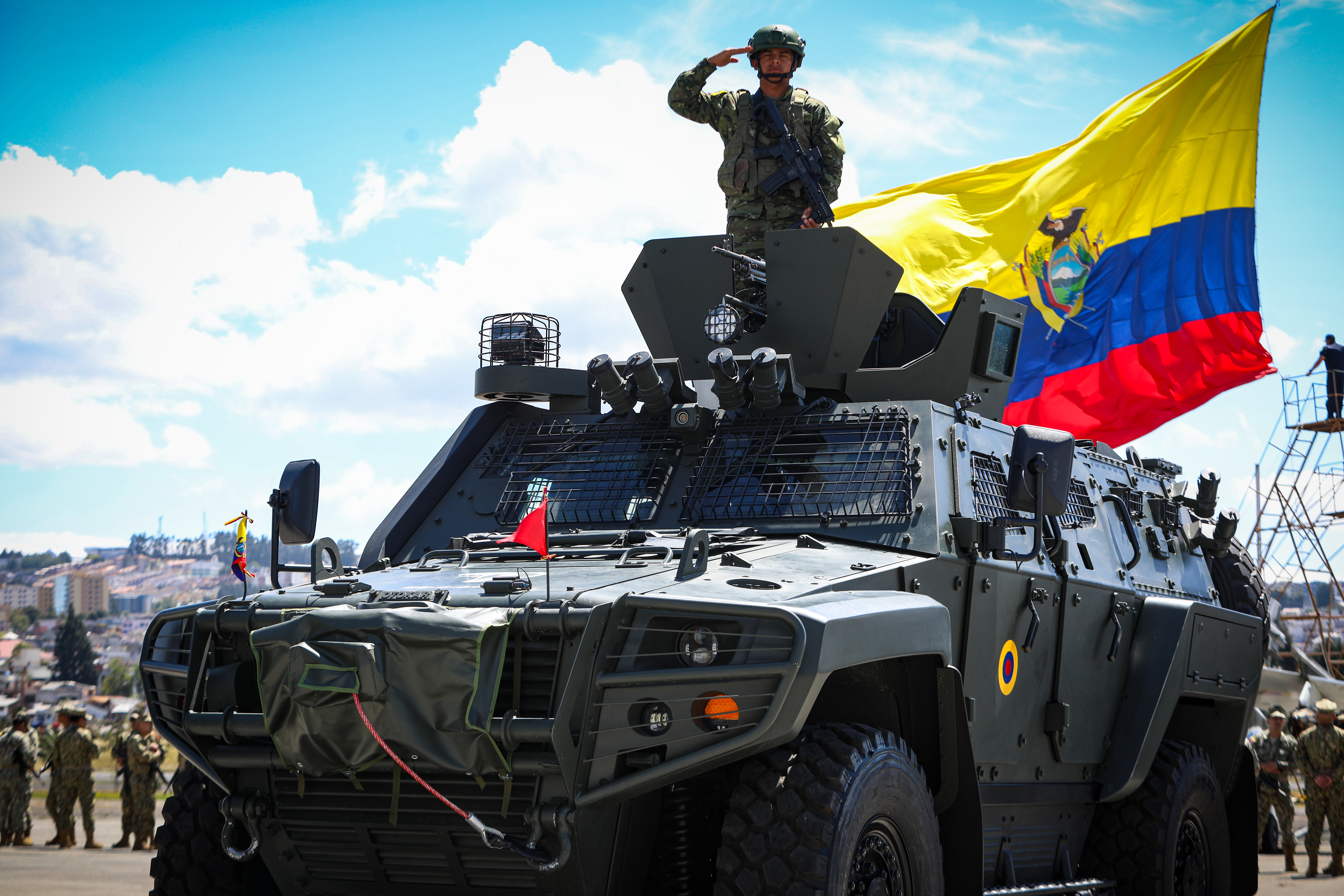
Ecuadorian Otokar Cobra II

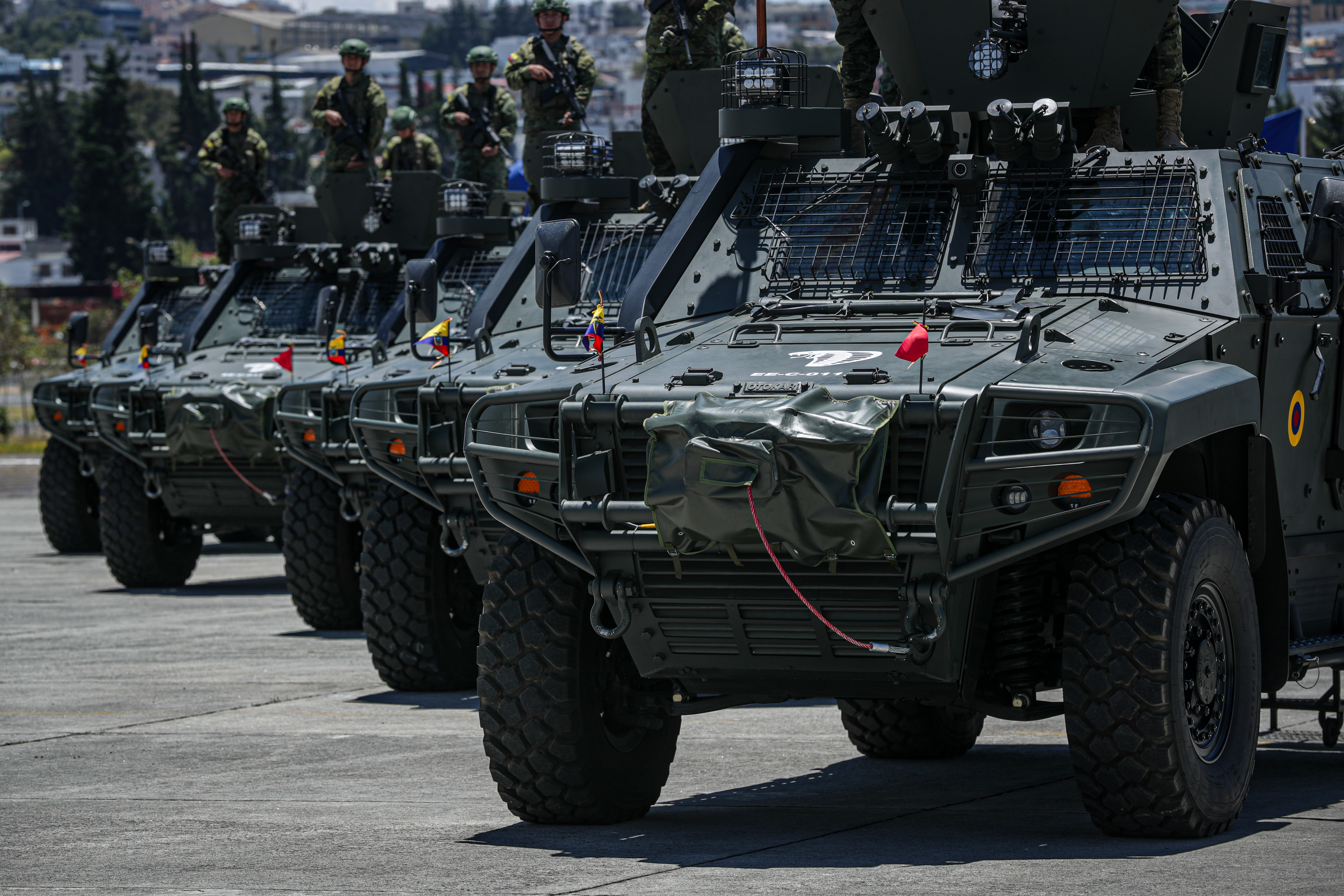
Cobra II vehicles at an Ecuadorian military ceremony

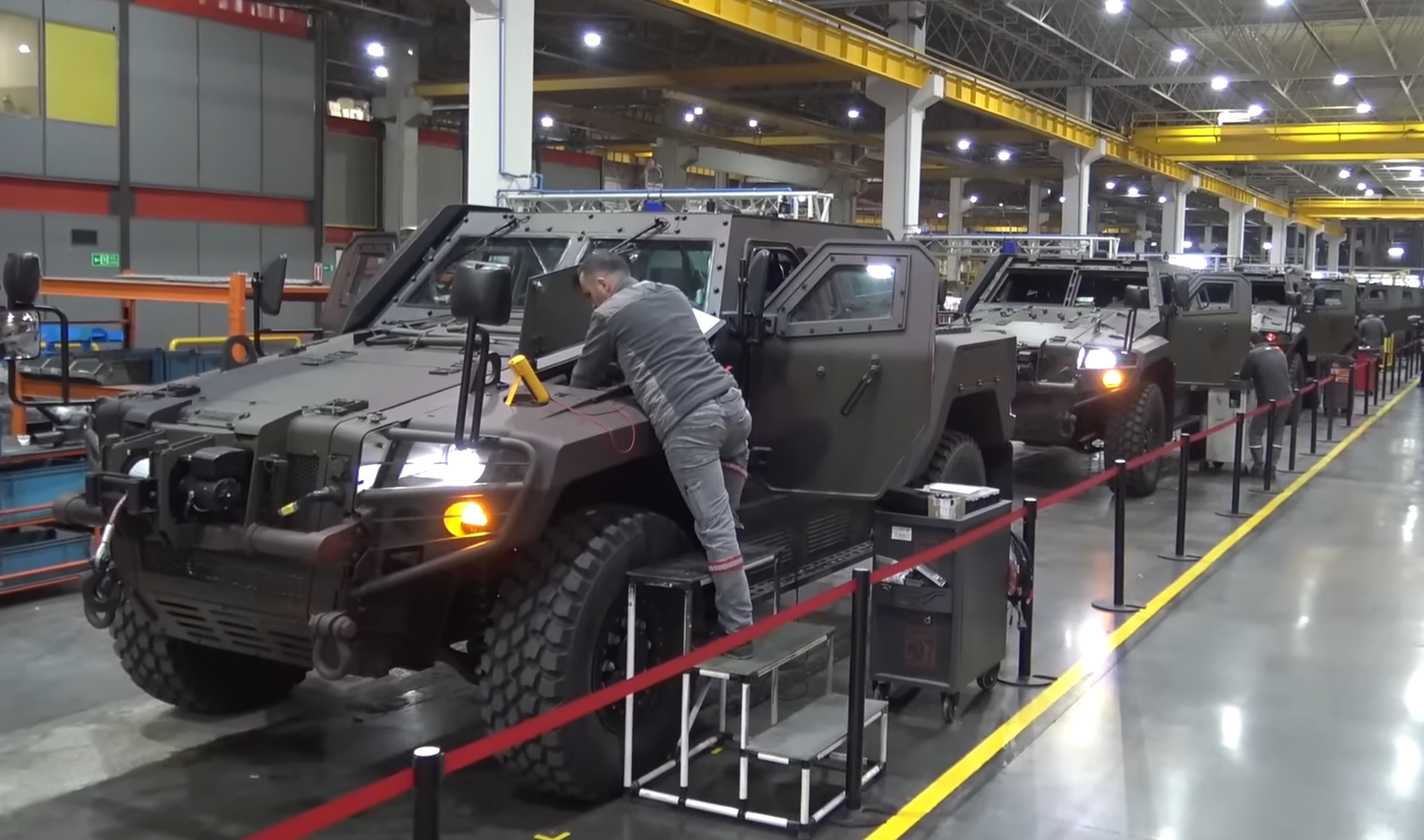
Cobra II for Romanian Land Forces on the assembly line

== See also ==
=== Comparable vehicles ===
- Joint Light Tactical Vehicle – (United States)
- Nurol Ejder – (Turkey)
- Sherpa Light – (France)
- URO VAMTAC – (Spain)
