= Military Virtue Medal =

Medalia "Virtutea Militară"
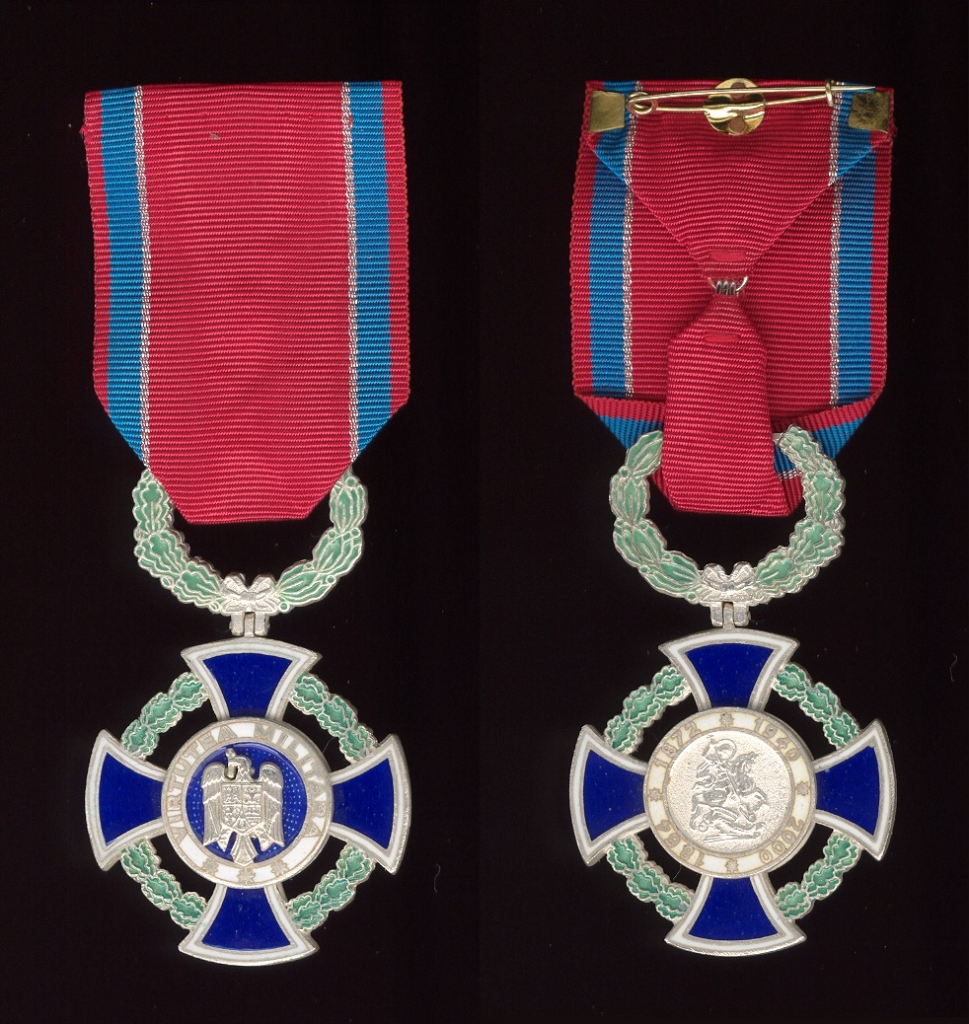
- Order of Military Virtue, Knight rank (Obverse and reverse)
- Type: Two class military medal
- Country: Romania
- Presented by: The King of Romania (1872–1947); The President of Romania
- Eligibility: Military and Civilians
- Established: April 1872
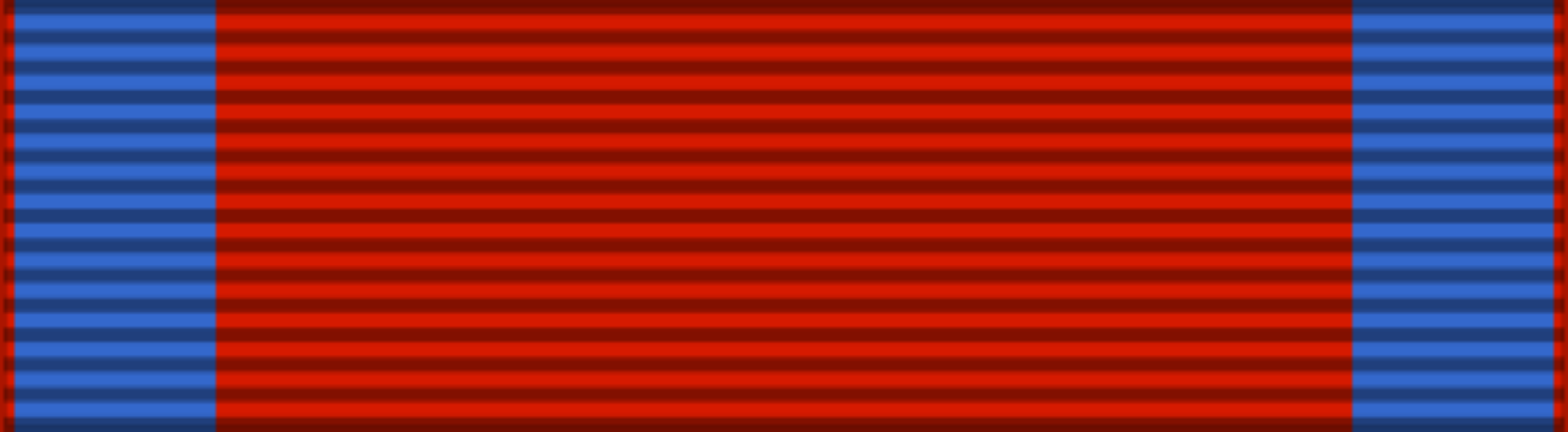
- Ribbon for Military Virtue Medal

Precedence
- Next (higher): Ordinul național "Pentru Merit"
- Equivalent: Ordinul "Virtutea Aeronautică"; Ordinul "Virtutea Maritimă"; Ordinul "Bărbăție și Credință"

The Military Virtue Medal (Romanian: Medalia "Virtutea Militară") is a Romanian military decoration, instituted on April 8, 1872, by King Carol I. A previous version, called Pro Virtute Militari, was established by Alexandru Ioan Cuza in 1860 for the veterans of the Dealul Spirii battle (1848) between the revolutionaries and the Ottomans, but it was issued to the recipients later, in 1866, due to political reasons (Romania was still under Ottoman suzerainty).

The medal had 2 classes, the 1st class (in gold) being awarded to the officers, and the 2nd class (in silver) to non-commissioned officers (NCOs) and the other enlisted ranks. After the Order of Michael the Brave was instituted (1916), the Military Virtue Medal was issued only to NCOs and below.

== Data ==
- Requirements: Awarded to NCOs and other enlisted ranks for exceptional deeds on the battlefield
- Classes: 2nd and 1st
- Date Instituted: April 1872

== War Medal of Military Virtue ==
In 1880 Carol I of Romania, the first ruler of the Hohenzollern-Sigmaringen dynasty, instituted a new Medal of Military Virtue. This one was given for bravery only during wartime. Soldiers who had earned the medal during wartime were able to trade in their old medal for a new wartime version, the War Medal of Military Virtue (Medalia Virtutea Militara de Razboi).

== Gallery ==
Ribbon of the War Medal of Military Virtue

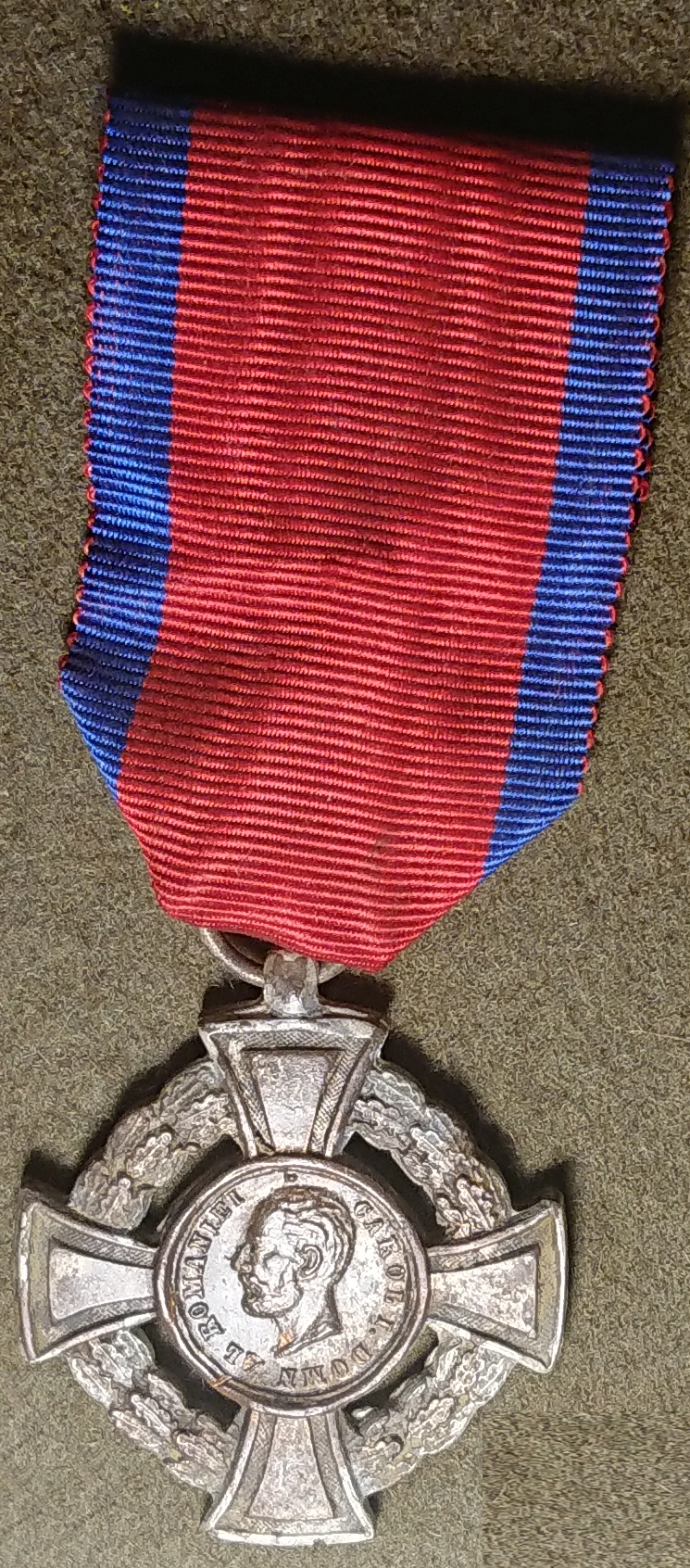
Order of Military Virtue, World War II

== See also ==
- List of military decorations
- National Decorations System (Romania)
- Military decoration
