= Dumitru Coroamă =

Romanian general (1885–1956)

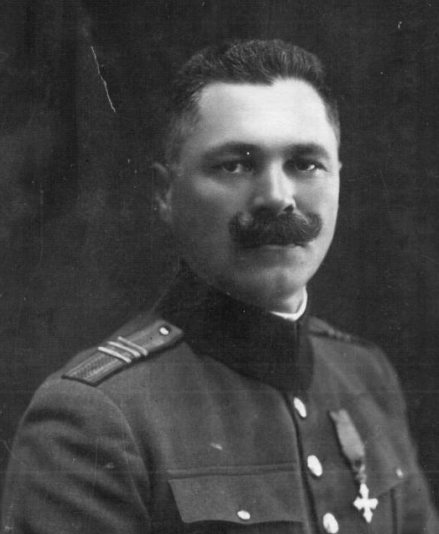
- Born: 19 July 1885; Hangu, Neamț County, Kingdom of Romania
- Died: 1956 (aged 70–71); Bucharest, People's Republic of Romania
- Burial place: Eternitatea Cemetery, Piatra Neamț
- Education: Higher War School
- Military career
- Allegiance: Romania; Anti-communist resistance
- Branch: Romanian Army
- Service years: 1907–1941; 1944–1948
- Rank: Major general
- Commands: 1st Guard Division; Bucharest Military Command; 4th Army Corps
- Conflicts: Second Balkan War; World War I; Romanian campaign; Battle of Mărășești; Hungarian–Romanian War; World War II; Romanian Campaign; Legionary Rebellion; Operation Spring Awakening
- Awards: Order of the Star of Romania; Order of Michael the Brave

Dumitru Coroamă (July 19, 1885 – 1956) was a Romanian soldier and fascist activist, who held the rank of major general of the Romanian Army during World War II. He was especially known for his contribution to the 1940 establishment of the National Legionary State by the far-right Iron Guard, with which he had been secretly involved for a decade. After beginnings as a schoolteacher in his native Neamț County, Coroamă had become an officer of the 15th Dorobanți Regiment, first earning distinction during World War I. Coroamă helped organize the defense of Western Moldavia, then participated in the Hungarian–Romanian War, establishing Romanian control in Bistrița and Baia Mare. He received the Order of the Star of Romania and the Order of Michael the Brave.

While stationed in Piatra Neamț during the interwar, Coroamă took up various political and cultural activities, overseeing the Romanian Scouts and setting up a Military Club. He was also involved in establishing a local branch of the Iron Guard. He was moved around to the garrison in Satu Mare, also becoming a General in 1934. Despite his commitment to the revolutionary ideology of the Guard, he was well-liked by King Carol II, and in 1937 became commander of the Royal Palace garrison. This allowed him to sabotage Carol's attempt to use Palace troops against the Guard; he thus helped with toppling Carol. In the aftermath of the coup, Coroamă was mistrusted and marginalized by Conducător Ion Antonescu. Given command of the 4th Army Corps in Iași, he witnessed the clashes between Antonescu and his Guard colleagues, peaking during the Legionary Rebellion of 1941. Coroamă took a moderate stance, and his mediation helped Antonescu to restore order in Iași without bloodshed. However, Coroamă remained isolated by government, and had to resign. Later in 1941, as Nazi Germany and Romania opened an Eastern Front against the Soviet Union, Coroamă advised against continuing the offensive beyond Bessarabia. When this was ignored, he left military life altogether.

Coroamă returned to public life after the Royal Coup of 1944, participating in conspiracies against Soviet occupation. Reportedly, he was one of the Romanian generals prepared to support Germany during Operation Spring Awakening; he later switched his allegiance toward the Romanian National Committee and worked to consolidate a national network of anti-communist resistance groups, including Guardist ones. Arrested by the communist regime in May 1948, he spent six years doing penal labor, and was reportedly tortured. He died within two years of his release.

== Biography ==
=== Early decades and rise ===
Coroamă was born on July 19, 1885, in Răpciune, a village in Hangu commune, Neamț County, nowadays covered by Lake Bicaz. He was the eighth of ten children born to Toma and Ecaterina Coroamă. His father, a likely immigrant from the neighboring Duchy of Bukovina, was mayor of Hangu in 1876–1881; as such, he represented his constituents in litigation against landowner Grigore Sturdza. Dumitru was the eighth of ten children born to the couple; his more distant relatives included Eustochia Ciucanu, who was Staritsa at Agapia Monastery from 1960 to her death in 1992. After graduating primary school in Schitu, the future general studied at the Petru Rareș High School, and worked as a substitute schoolteacher in Suceava County, at Broșteni, and then in Neamț, at Farcașa. Opting for a career in the Romanian Land Forces, he graduated from the Infantry Officers' School (1907), emerging as a Sub-lieutenant, and then took a graduate diploma from the Higher War School.

Assigned to the 15th Dorobanți Regiment in Piatra Neamț, Coroamă first saw action during the Second Balkan War of 1913. He was again called to action during the campaign of World War I, overseeing defensive maneuvers on the fortified lines of the Trotuș, Oituz, and Uz river valleys. By 1916, Coroamă was a captain, and in full command the 3rd Infantry Battalion. He earned distinction following the Battle of Mărășești: he was cited on October 11, 1916, for his "initiative and energy in holding on to a difficult position", and, on December 27, was made a Knight of the Order of the Star of Romania. He continued to receive other distinctions, including the Order of Michael the Brave 3rd Class (presented by Eremia Grigorescu) and various medals of the Allied countries. He was later an Officer of the Order of the Star of Romania.

On December 6, 1918, Coroamă, by then a Major, led his troops into Transylvania, arriving by train at Bistrița (see Union of Transylvania with Romania). Upon entering that city, he met with the Hungarian Republican administration, which he did not immediately depose. When the incumbent mayor, Gábor Ajtai Nagy, asked him to "spare the city", Coroamă replied that this his only mandate was to reestablish order "together with city leaders". He was subsequently in charge of the Romanian garrison for the entire County of Bistrița. Following the outbreak of a Hungarian–Romanian War, Coroamă led the assault battalion that secured Baia Mare on January 6, 1919. An accidental ecrasite explosion wounded Coroamă in the train station of Dej. He was badly hurt, and had to be sent to Cluj for recovery.

Coroamă's interwar career saw him returning to Piatra Neamț, where he was made Garrison Commander. In October 1927, he was promoted to Colonel and in 1929 was officially made Commander of the 15th Regiment. The interval also witnessed Coroamă's involvement in far-right politics. In 1930, together with his wife, he established a Piatra Neamț chapter of the Iron Guard and sponsored its network of "Cross Brotherhoods". The family home featured a portrait of the Guardist leader, Corneliu Zelea Codreanu, whom Coroamă had met during the previous war. The building was flooded and suffered damages during the heavy rains of May 1930, but was swiftly restored.

King Carol II appointed Coroamă Brigadier General in late 1934, after he had taken the final exams with top honors. During the early 1930s, he had involved himself with the Romanian Scouting Movement, presiding upon its meetings in Neamț County and directing its propaganda efforts. He also founded a Military Club and provided lectures detailing his own front-line experience. In 1935, he was reassigned to lead the 16th Infantry Brigade of Satu Mare. In June of that year, he was included on a panel which proposed to transform Gorunzel meadow into the Satu Mare Airfield; the project was finally completed in September 1937. In November 1936, Coroamă presented military honors to Carol and Crown Prince Michael, who passed through Satu Mare on their way back from a state visit in Czechoslovakia. Alongside Greek Catholic Bishop Alexandru Rusu, he presided over the Satu Mare chapter of the Anti-Revisionist League, which campaigned against Hungarian irredentism.

=== 1940 coup and 1941 rebellion ===
In November 1937, Coroamă became General Officer Commanding 1st Guard Division at the Royal Palace in Bucharest, in service to Carol II. However, he secretly supported the Iron Guard's leader Horia Sima, who was in conflict with Carol's National Renaissance Front. Sima's rise had been made possible by Carol's decision to arrest, and then assassinate, Codreanu. Coroamă's contacts with Sima were at the core of an enduring controversy between Guard factions: Codreanu's loyalist cells, which distrusted Sima, also viewed Coroamă as an agent of the Front and an appeaser. They noted in particular Coroamă's acknowledgement that he had mediated a September 1938 encounter between Sima and Carol's spymaster, Mihail Moruzov. During these contacts, Coroamă was expected to present Carol with a memorandum on behalf of Codreanu, who had been detained and would later be killed in custody. Coroamă himself claimed that the initiative was curbed by Sima, who did not want Codreanu alive.

As acknowledged by Sima, by May 1940 there were other encounters involving himself, Coroamă and Moruzov. During these parlays, they agreed that the Iron Guard should merge into the Front, which, on Coroamă's suggestion, was to be renamed "Front of the Nation". On June 6, 1940, he was promoted to the rank of major general. Coroamă rose to prominence after the events of autumn 1940, when the Second Vienna Award, which lost Romania rule over Northern Transylvania, engendered a political crisis. The Iron Guard began preparing for violent takeover, with Nicolae Petrașcu tasked with arming the would-be revolutionaries. As historian Ilarion Țiu notes, these "terrorist cells" were formed "from the second half of August, but on 3 September each member barely managed to have a revolver and the available hand grenades were very few". In this context, Coroamă cooperated with Sima; he also came into contact with another authoritarian figure, General Ion Antonescu, who was reluctantly appointed Premier by Carol. In early September, as a sign of his cooperation with Sima, Antonescu appointed Coroamă to the post of General Officer in charge of Bucharest's Military Command, replacing the loyalist Gheorghe Argeșanu.

On September 4, Carol received Antonescu, who informed him that the Iron Guard wanted a new king; on the occasion Antonescu also commented that the Front's government "cannot count on the commanders, and especially not on General Coroamă, who has switched completely toward the Iron Guard." Soon afterward, Antonescu was told that two other loyalist generals, Gheorghe Mihail and Paul Teodorescu, were planning to have him killed. He consequently demanded Carol's abdication. In tandem, General Coroamă refused to comply with the royal order of shooting down Guardists who marched in front of the Palace. According to several period witnesses, his resistance persuaded Antonescu to follow suit, and allowed for a bloodless transition. When interrogated by Avram Bunaciu in early 1946, Antonescu himself recalled being poorly impressed by Coroamă's inaction, since it jeopardized Carol's personal safety. He reports telling him: "You sir were the king's trusted man. [...] If these were your ideas, then you shouldn't have accepted such an appointment." An account originating with the Guardist Ilie-Vlad Sturdza has it that "the two generals said they could not order to shoot at the population as long as no bullets [had been] fired for the lost territories."

Coroamă himself confessed that he was an active participant in the coup, bringing up reserve troops to support the Guard. For this reason, Carol arrested him; Antonescu ordered his release, thus signaling to the king that he was no longer in control of the country. An anecdote relayed by the old-regime politician Constantin Argetoianu presents another version of events, claiming that Antonescu had asked Coroamă to storm the area outside the Palace, though "without firing a shot." Also according to Argetoianu, Coroamă never showed up for duty, and claimed that he was "besieged in my own house" by the Guardists, who had mistaken him for the detested Argeșanu, also a mustachioed general. Coroamă's "inane" request was to have dispatches aired by Radio Bucharest, informing his assailants that "General Coroamă and General Argeșanu both wear mustaches"; an amused Antonescu urged him to "shave it off".

Like other Guardists, Coroamă was dissatisfied with Antonescu's regime, or "National Legionary State". Already on September 9, 1940, he was sent over as General Officer of the 4th Army Corps, stationed at Iași, which equated with a demotion. Coroamă survived Antonescu's violent split with the Guard and the Legionary Rebellion of January 1941. As reported by diarist Mihail Sebastian, rumor spread that Coroamă and Corneliu Dragalina were marching on Bucharest to assist Sima against Antonescu. This scenario was upheld by the Guardist poet Radu Gyr: on January 22, he addressed "several hundreds" of his comrades, informing them that the Coroamă–Dragalina march was both welcomed and imminent.

However, Coroamă had again resumed his mitigating position and, alongside other Iași Guardists, including Ilie-Vlad Sturdza, he fought to pacify the city and minimize bloodshed. According to Nazi German diplomatic cables, he did so because he feared that the Soviet Union would profit from the unrest and invade Romania. Coroamă also sought an understanding with the Guardist leader, Gheorghe Grijincu, asking him to return control over government buildings, and also to pledge resistance in case of a Soviet attack. Another army leader, Constantin Sănătescu, noted that despite his standing as a "Guard sympathizer" Coroamă "behaved well, managing to peacefully quell the rebellion". Coroamă resigned his commission as commander of the 4th Army Corps in January 1941.

=== Repression and imprisonment ===
In February, following the resumption of government control over Iași, Coroamă was sent to the reserves. Sănătescu, who took over as commander of the 4th Army Corps at around that time, claimed that his predecessor had been sacked following a quarrel with Antonescu. Coroamă continued to be marginalized as Romania opened an Eastern Front: he supported the retaking of Bessarabia, but argued that Romania should only send an expeditionary corps to assist Germany beyond that stage. Antonescu ignored this advice, pushing Coroamă to resign from the army and return to civilian life in Piatra Neamț. Coroamă found himself under constant surveillance by Antonescu's Siguranța. He and Antonescu still exchanged letters in December 1942, during the encirclement at Stalingrad. Coroamă openly praised Major Gheorghe Răscănescu and his soldiers, all of whom were Neamț-based, for their success in breaking out through the Soviet lines; he and other veterans congratulated Antonescu personally, who replied to thank them.

By 1944, a Soviet offensive had pierced into Romania, prompting the Royal Coup which toppled Antonescu. When Romania formally joined the Allied Powers, Coroamă was an alleged double-dealer, resuming his contacts with Sima, who now headed a pro-Nazi government in exile. During Operation Spring Awakening in March 1945, generals Coroamă, Dragalina, Sănătescu, Petre Dumitrescu, and Radu Korne were reportedly involved in a Nazi-organized plot to overthrow the Soviet occupation forces. Such initiatives failed and, over the following three years, the country underwent steady communization, ultimately reemerging as a communist state. As reported by the Guardist Ion Gavrilă Ogoranu in a 1999 interview, "in 1946–1947" Coroamă integrated with the anti-communist resistance, though as an army representative rather than as a Guard member. Ogoranu identifies Coroamă and Dragalina as members of the resistance coordinating committee, answering to the National Peasants' Party and the Romanian National Committee; Guardist cells were represented therein by Nicolae Petrașcu. Gavrilă Ogoranu also recalled that in autumn 1947 Coroamă, who was based in Sibiu, traveled to Sâmbăta de Sus Monastery and met Arsenie Boca, with whom he planned various anti-communist activities.

On May 15, 1948, as the new regime inaugurated its hunt for Guardists, Coroamă was detained at Jilava Prison. He was being subjected to repeated interrogations at Suceava penitentiary, where he was confronted with hostile witnesses Nicolae Popa and Lucian Pascaru; however, the Securitate only formally registered him as a prisoner on January 23, 1951, when the accusation was formulated as: "has supported the Iron Guard." Coroamă had by then been sentenced to eight years in "labor colonies". In 1949, Coroamă was sent by train westward, to Ocnele Mari; he shared the cattle car with junior members of the Guard, including those who had sent him the 1938 memorandum. He used this occasion to explain to them the circumstances in which the memorandum had been lost. Coroamă shared confinement with other former Guardsmen—including Petre Țuțea and Ioan Victor Vojen; they joined a selection of former political rivals, including Mihail Manoilescu, Aurel Leucuția, and Petre Pandrea. In his samizdat memoirs, Pandrea would include an account of "Carol II's odyssey, with its exact details", claiming that it was partly sourced from "things confessed to me by Mihail Manoilescu and General Coroamă".

Another survivor of Ocnele Mari, Ioan Dumitrescu-Borșa, recalls: "[Coroamă was] a short, gentle, congenial, wise little old man. He was incapable of ever offending anyone. He always urged us to be self-contained and peaceful. He never spoke of himself." Reports also suggest that he was fed broths made of beechnut and hay, a starvation treatment which pushed him to gnaw on his straw mat, or on wild dandelions. Allegedly, the general was slated for persecution by a Romani man of the Securitate, who made him perform pointless physical exercise and beat him repeatedly. Such mistreatment left him paralyzed and mute, his injuries unattended to for an entire year.

Coroamă was later relocated to Aiud, Gherla, and Văcărești prisons, being ultimately released on June 19, 1954. By then, he had been deemed too ill to survive detention, and was dropped off by Securitate officials at the home of a Bucharest relative; this was to be his last domicile. Coroamă died in 1956. Eight years later, his body was reburied at Eternitatea Cemetery in Piatra Neamț. This final ceremony was attended by fellow generals Nicolae Dăscălescu and Ilie Crețulescu, but also by Securitate agents monitoring dissent. An announcement by his surviving relatives, released in 1973 (still under communism), presents 1964 as his death year, while informing that his wife Eugenia had died in May 1962. They were both to be commemorated at Boteanu Church.
