= Breaza (disambiguation) =

Breaza may refer to several places in Romania:

- Breaza, a town in Prahova County
- Breaza, Buzău, a commune in Buzău County
- Breaza, Mureș, a commune in Mureș County
- Breaza, Suceava, a commune in Suceava County, and its village of Breaza de Sus
- Breaza, a village in Negrilești Commune, Bistrița-Năsăud County
- Breaza (Hungarian: Breáza), a village in Lisa Commune, Brașov County
- Breaza, a village in Bârgăuani Commune, Neamț County
- Breaza, a tributary of the Cibin in Sibiu County
- Breaza, a tributary of the Moldova
- Breaza (Olt), a tributary of the Olt in Brașov County

== See also ==
- Breazova (disambiguation)
