= Arsenie Boca =

Romanian monk and theologian (1910–1989)

Saint Arsenie of Prislop
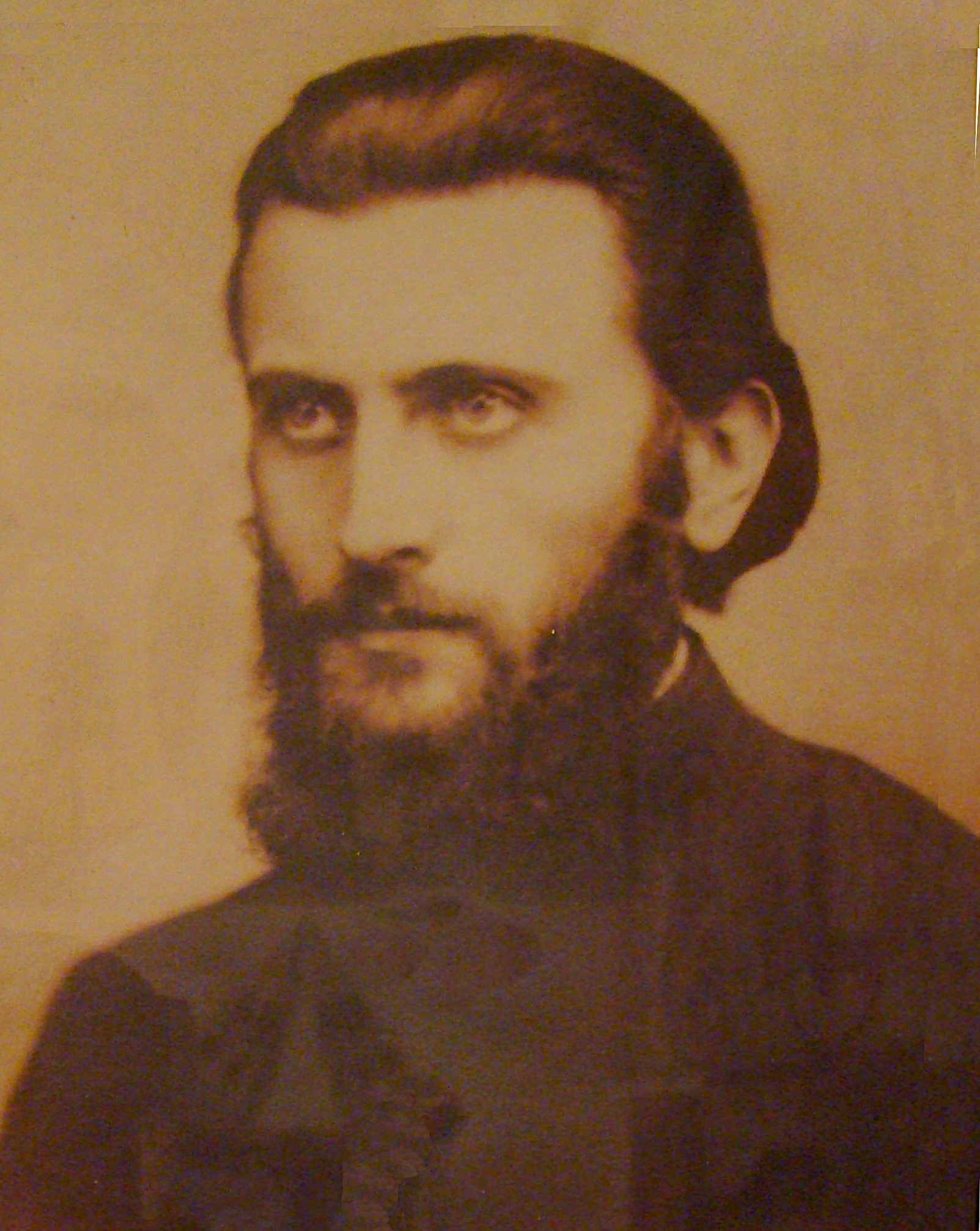

Venerable Confessor
- Born: 29 September 1910; Alváca, Hungary (today Vața de Sus, Romania)
- Died: 28 November 1989 (aged 79); Sinaia, Romania
- Venerated in: Romanian Orthodox Church
- Canonized: 4 February 2025, Bucharest by the Synod of the Romanian Orthodox Church
- Major shrine: Prislop Monastery
- Feast: 28 November (NS)

Arsenie of Prislop (secular name Zian Boca, Romanian pronunciation: [arˈseni.e ˈboka]; 29 September 1910 – 28 November 1989) was a Romanian priest, theologian, mystic, and artist. He was persecuted by the Romanian Communist Party. He is venerated as a saint in the Romanian Orthodox Church.

Born in Vața de Sus, Hunedoara County, he died at Sinaia Monastery and was buried at Prislop Monastery in Silvașu de Sus village. In a poll of the Romanian public conducted by Romanian Television in 2006, Boca was voted 79th among 100 Greatest Romanians.

== Studies and formation ==
Boca was born in 1910, in Vața de Sus; his parents, Iosif and Cristina, gave him the first name Zian. He studied at the Avram Iancu High School in Brad, Hunedoara County, graduating in 1929. The same year he embarked upon study at the Theological Academy in Sibiu, from which he graduated in 1933. He received a scholarship from the Archbishop of Transylvania to study at the Fine Arts Academy in Bucharest. Meanwhile, he attended the medical classes of Professor Francisc Rainer and the Christian Mysticism class of ultra-right ideologist, Professor Nichifor Crainic.

Professor Costin Petrescu, who saw him to have artistic talent, entrusted him with the painting of a depiction of Mihai Viteazul for the Romanian Athenaeum. Sent by his bishop, he travelled to Mount Athos for documentation and spiritual experience.

== Serving the Church ==
Boca was made a deacon on 29 September 1935 by Metropolitan Nicolae Bălan of Transylvania. In 1939 he spent three months in the Romanian Skete of Prodromos on Mount Athos. On his return, he joined the Brâncoveanu Monastery at Sâmbăta de Sus, Brașov County, where he took his vows and was tonsured into monasticism in 1940. He was ordained priest and became the abbot of the Brâncoveanu Monastery in 1942. As abbot he embellished and renovated the buildings of the monastery, while also enriching its spiritual and cultural life. He helped theologian Dumitru Stăniloae from Sibiu with the translation into Romanian of the first volumes of the Philokalia, a collection of early Church Fathers and monastics in the hesychast tradition.

In 2018, the novelist Tatiana Niculescu stated that he was an adept of Anthroposophy, a spiritual movement initiated by the Austrian occultist Rudolf Steiner, which, she said, influenced Boca's paintings at the church at Drăgănescu, wherein the spectre of Jesus Christ rises from the rock covering the grave. She also associated his mind reading powers to the practice of mentalism. Niculescu's accusations were fervently denied by the Arsenie Boca Foundation, in an article by Dutu Florin. The article accuses the novelist of intentionally "falsifying Fr. Boca's biography" by using second-rate accounts from a Securitate file, embellished by her own imagination.

According to Ionuț Daniel Băncilă, Boca was not an antroposophist, but he got highly regarded by anthroposophists; they believed he was clairvoyant and mystically enlightened. Boca lambasted occultism and spiritualism, but not specifically Anthroposophy.

=== Under Socialism ===
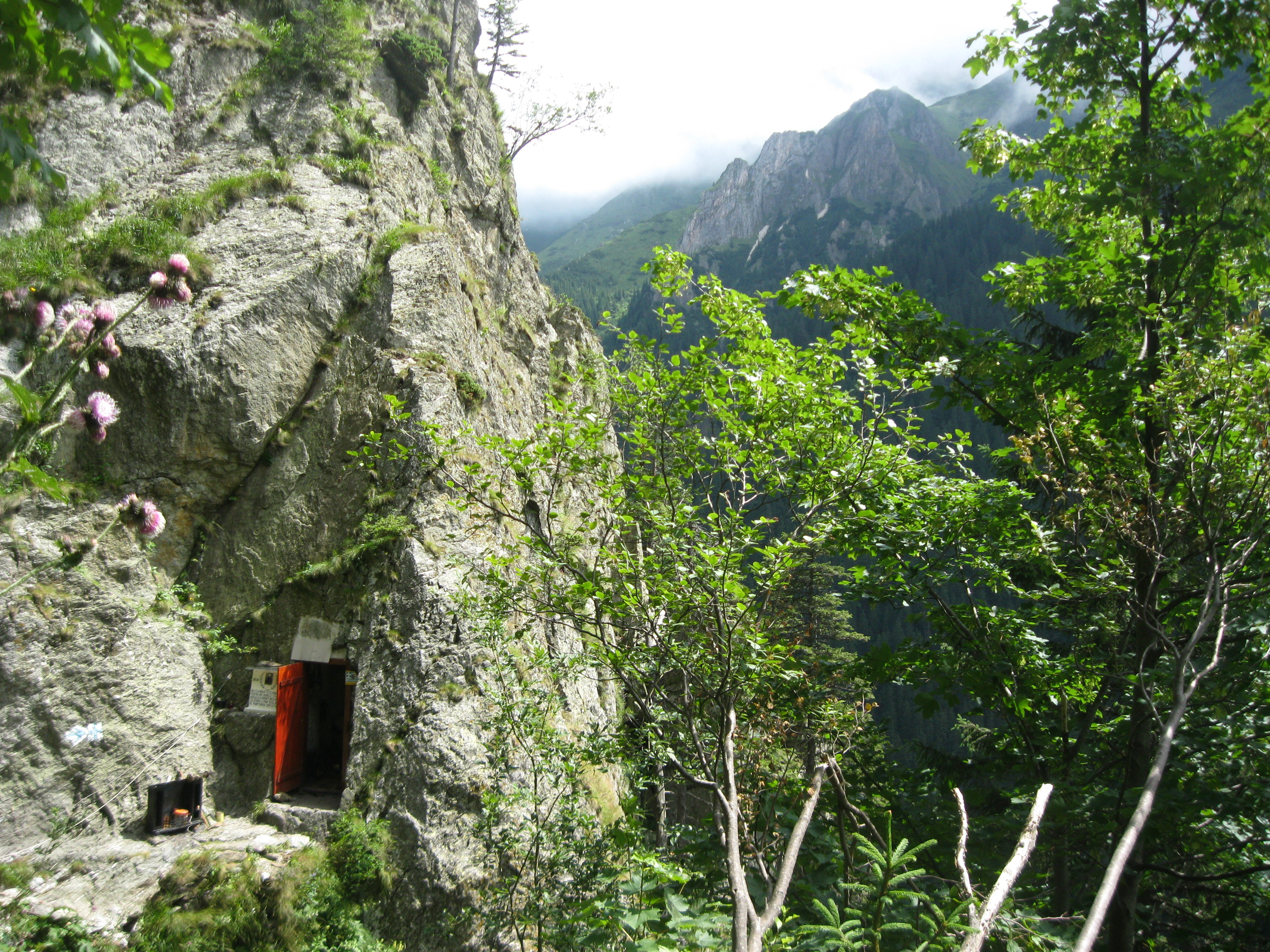
Boca's hermitage in Valea Sâmbetei, Făgăraș Mountains, where he hid for a while from the Securitate

“Regarding the activity of the monk Boca Arsenie, we were informed that he [was part of] the subversive counter-revolutionary anthroposophical organization of the RPR, enjoying great appreciation from the members of this organization. In an anthroposophical meeting that took place in Cluj on May 31, 1953, in the house of the named Givulescu Cornel, it emerged that Boca Arsenie has connections with one of the leaders of the anthroposophical circle in Câmpia Turzii, named Iustian Iustin, as well as with Ionascu Ioan, an anthroposophist from Timisoara” [206]. [...] “This monk has the 'gift of clairvoyance' and after he joined the anthroposophical group he made rapid progress, the participants in the meeting spoke with great admiration towards this monk” [207].

— DRSS Deva to DRSS Ploiesti, 21 November 1953, DRSS Cluj to DRSS Hunedoara, 6 June 1953

After World War II, he was arrested in July 1945 in Râmnicu Vâlcea by the Securitate secret police and detained for several days. Once the Romanian People's Republic was installed in Romania, Boca was persecuted by the authorities and the regime's secret police, the Securitate. He was arrested and imprisoned several times for allegedly helping the Romanian anti-communist resistance movement. As reported by Ion Gavrilă Ogoranu in a 1999 interview, General Dumitru Coroamă, a resistance leader who was based in Sibiu, travelled in the fall of 1947 to Sâmbăta de Sus Monastery and met Boca, with whom he planned various resistance activities. In June 1948 Boca was arrested and detained at the Securitate facility in Făgăraș. After being released in November, Boca was removed from Brâncoveanu Monastery to Prislop Monastery and thence to Sinaia Monastery.

Arrested again in January 1951, he was interned by administrative order at the Danube–Black Sea Canal, being released in March 1952. Kept under surveillance, he was re-arrested in November 1955 and sentenced by the Military Tribunal in Timișoara to 6 months imprisonment. Transferred from the Timișoara penitentiary to the Jilava Prison near Bucharest, he arrived at the Oradea penitentiary in December, and was detained there until April 1956. Boca was banned from monasticism and Church activities and was constantly under the surveillance and harassment of the Securitate.

== Works of art ==
Arsenie Boca had his own vision upon creating religious paintings which some have regarded as controversial. His icons depicting Francis of Assisi among Orthodox Saints are criticized by some Orthodox Christians. However, the Orthodox Church has never made any official ruling on Francis of Assisi, and so some regard this iconographic depiction as legitimate.

== Process of canonisation ==
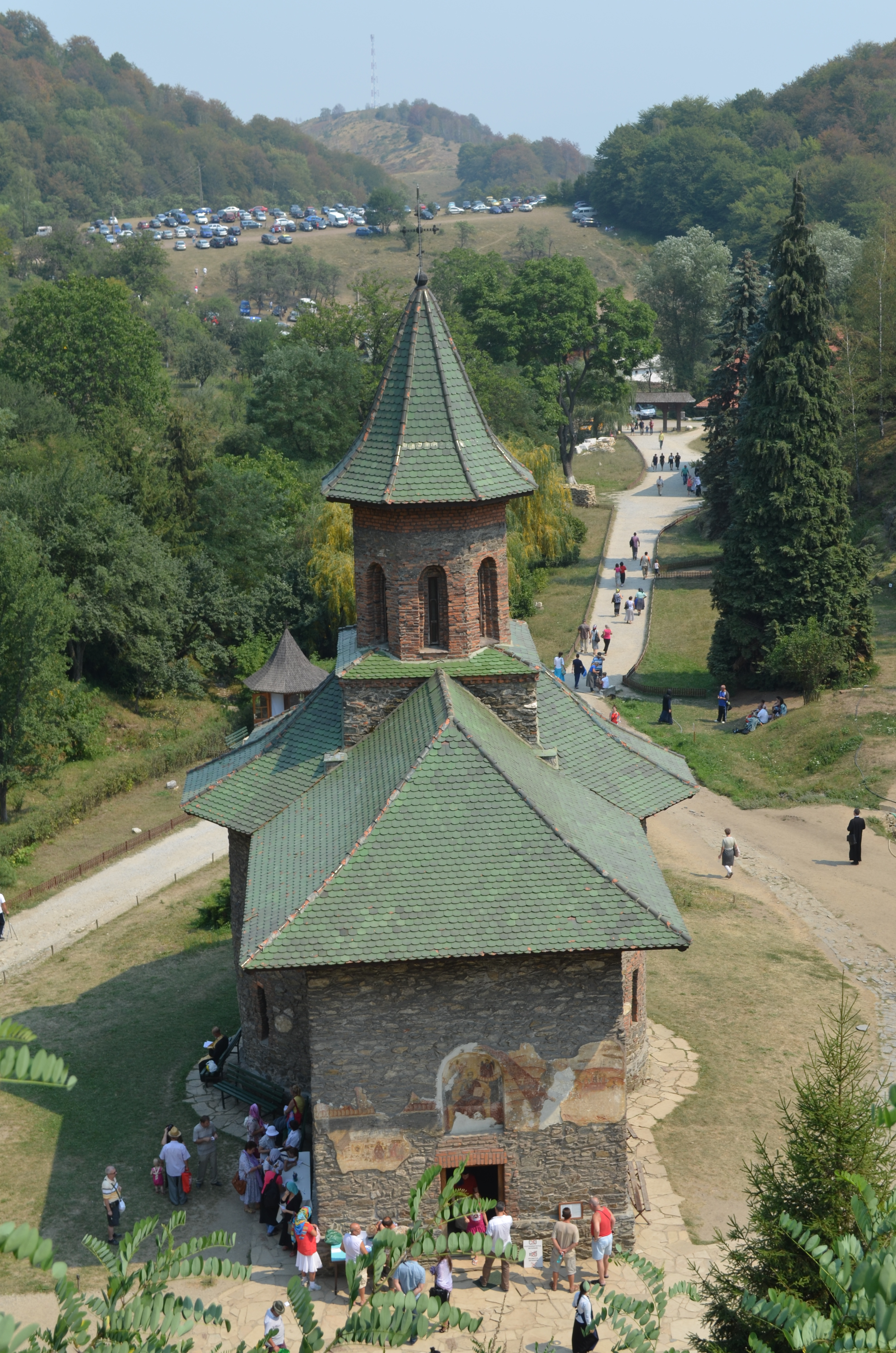
Prislop Monastery

In October 2015 the Romanian Orthodox Church announced that it was considering the cause of his recognition and proclamation as a saint.

In September 2019 Fr. Arsenie Boca was proposed for canonization.

Dan Ciachir stated that Boca is "neither a saint, nor a heretic", and therefore should not be canonized. He also states that Boca was lightly punished by the Communist regime with "just a few months of prison".

In July 2024, the Romanian Orthodox Church announced its decision that Boca would be canonized.

The Synodal decree of canonization of him and 14 other new Romanian saints was released 4 February 2025.
