= Sambada =

Sambada may refer to:

- Sambada (dance), a Brazilian folk dance, one of the precursors of samba
- Sambada (newspaper), Indian newspaper
- Sambada, a 2007 EP by Solomun (musician)

== See also ==
- Lambada, another Brazilian dance
- Zambada, a surname
- Sambata (disambiguation)
