= Sâmbăta (disambiguation) =

Sâmbăta, Romanian for 'Saturday', may refer to the following places in Romania:

- Sâmbăta, a commune in Bihor County
- Sâmbăta de Sus, a commune in Braşov County
- Sâmbăta de Jos, a village in Voila, Braşov County
- Sâmbăta Nouă, a village in Topolog, Tulcea County
- Sâmbăta (river)
