= Vasya Pupkin =

Colloquial Russian placeholder name for a man

In the culture of Russia, Vasya Pupkin (Russian: Вася Пупкин) is a placeholder name for an average, random, or unknown (Russian) man, similar to "John Doe" or "Joe Blow".

"Vasya Pupkin" is a funny-sounding name: the surname is derived from the word пуп, "navel" and the given name is a diminutive of "Vasily" (a Russian equivalent of "Basil"). The surname can be traced to Russian naval slang, as a reference to an abstract sailor, usually, a lazy, inept, or cowardly, in expressions, such as "Where is this Pupkin, who dumped diesel fuel overboard"?

The name "Vasya Pupkin" has become popular in Russian internet culture, coming from humorous folklore (parodies, tales, jokes). Vasya Pupkin became the personification of the mass Russian Internet user, which has become firmly entrenched in online folklore. Usage example: vasya@pupkin.ru.

In 2005 the name was the runner up, after Vladimir Putin, in the Novaya Gazeta poll of the popularity of Russian politicians. Sociologist Aleksey Levinson interpreted this as an indicator of low popularity of Russian politicians.

Vasha Pupkin (ヴァーシャパプキン, Bāsha Papukin) is among the main characters of Yakitori: Soldiers of Misfortune, a Japanese novel series.

== See also ==
- Bulă, a stock character in Romanian comedy, was voted the 51st among the 100 Greatest Romanians in 2006
