= Crețulescu =

Crețulescu or Kretzulescu may refer to:

== Romanian surname ==
- Constantin A. Kretzulescu (1809–1884), academic and politician
- Catherine Caradja (née Ecaterina Olimpia Crețulescu; 1893–1993), aristocrat and philanthropist
- Ilie Crețulescu (1892–1971), army officer
- Nicolae Kretzulescu (1812–1900), politician and physician

== Other uses ==
- Crețulescu Palace, a palace in Bucharest
- Kretzulescu Church, a Romanian Orthodox church in Bucharest
