= Petru Rareș National College =

Petru Rareș National College (Romanian: Colegiul Național "Petru Rareș") may refer to one of three educational institutions in Romania:

- Petru Rareș National College (Beclean)
- Petru Rareș National College (Piatra Neamț)
- Petru Rareș National College (Suceava)
