= Constantin Lăcătușu =

Romanian mountain climber, geologist, and camera operator

Constantin “Ticu” Lăcătușu (Romanian pronunciation: [konstanˈtin ləkəˈtuʃu]; born 21 February 1961) is a Romanian mountaineer, geologist, and camera operator. He is the first Romanian to reach the summit of Mount Everest (May 17, 1995), Broad Peak, and Cho Oyu.

== Biography ==
Lăcătușu was born in Piatra Neamț, Romania, on February 21, 1961. After secondary studies at Petru Rareș High School in Piatra Neamț, he enrolled at the Faculty of Geology and Geophysics of the University of Bucharest, graduating in 1986. He is married to television personality and journalist Irina Păcurariu and has two daughters: Ana Carina (born 20 August 2000) and Iris Petra (born 19 April 2008).

== The “Seven Summits” project ==
Lăcătușu is the first and only Romanian to finish the Seven Summits project. He completed (Reinhold Messner’s list (Carstensz list) in 8 years and 166 days.

- June 1990: Mount Elbrus (5,642 m).
- February 4, 1995: Mount Kilimanjaro (5,895 m) - Marangu route
- May 17, 1995: Mount Everest (8,848 m) - first Romanian ascent, North Col-North ridge-NE ridge route.
- February 16, 1996: Aconcagua (6,962 m) - normal route.
- June 4, 1997: Mount McKinley (Denali) (6,194 m) - first Romanian team ascent, West Buttress route (with Cornel Galescu).
- April 25, 2000: Puncak Jaya (Carstensz Pyramid) (4,884 m) - first Romanian ascent, Messner route (East ridge).
- December 10, 2001: Vinson Massif (4,897 m) - normal route.

== 8,000 m+ mountains summited ==
- 1992: Broad Peak (8,051 m) - first Romanian 8,000 m ascent.
- 1995: Mount Everest (8,848 m) - first Romanian ascent, North Col-North ridge-NE ridge route.
- 1998: Cho Oyu (8,201 m) - the first Romanian successful self-supported 8,000m expedition, solo ascent, without bottled oxygen.

== Other notable ascents ==
In Europe:

- 1990: Mount Elbrus East (5,621 m), Ushba North (4,710 m), Pic Sciurovski (4,259 m), Chatin-Tau W (4,200 m).
- 1991: Donguzorun (4,458 m) - first Romanian ascent, solo; Ullu Tau W (4,203 m).
- 1993: Nakratau (4,451 m) - first Romanian ascent; Keishi (3,702 m) - first Romanian ascent; Nakratau-Donguzorun traverse - first Romanian ascent; Mount Elbrus (5,642 m); Pic Sciurovski (4,259m) - the North wall, Herghiani route. All ascent were made with Lynx Piatra Neamț team (V. Tofan, A. Vivirschi, L. Mihai, L. Constantinescu, S. Baciu).
- 1994: Monte Rosa - Vf. Dufourspitze (4,634 m) - first Romanian team ascent; Breithorn (4,164 m) – first Romanian ascent, NW wall, Welzenbach route; Matterhorn (4,478 m); Rimpfischhorn (4,199 m) - first Romanian ascent. All ascent were made with A. Beleaua, V. Tofan, and C. Vrabie.
- 2004: Castor (4,228 m) - first Romanian ascent; Pollux (4,092 m) - first Romanian ascent; Liskamm (4,527 m) - new route on North face. All ascents were made with Cezar Cordun, Simion Poiană, and Robert Tutuianu.
- 2005: Weisshorn (4,505 m) (with Lucian Mihai).
- 2006: Teide (3,718 m), Mont Blanc (4,810 m), Grossglockner (3,798 m), Zugspitze (2,962 m) (all ascents with Simion Poiană).

In Asia:

- 1994: Mount Everest (8,848 m) - reached 8,100m on a new route, N-NE Face, Tibet.
- 1996: Dhaulagiri (8,167 m) - stopped at approximately 7,800 m due to bad weather.
- 1998: Cho Oyu (8,201 m) - on a new route he reached 7,500 m in bad, deteriorating weather.
- 1999: Dhaulagiri NE peak of the summit ridge (8,140 m) - solo ascent.
- 2003: Machermo (6,237 m) - virgin peak in Gokio zone (Khumbu region), first team to ascent (with Viorel Amzaroiu and Vladimir Condratov).
- 2004: Rifil Peak (6,200 m) - virgin peak on Broken Glacier (Kangchenjunga region), first team to ascent; Tsisima Peak (6,250 m) - virgin peak on Tsisima Glacier (regiunea Kangchenjunga), first team to ascent; Janak Peak (7090 m) - virgin peak in Kangchenjunga region; reached 6,500 m on West face (all ascents made with Ioan Torok).
- 2006: Europa Peak (6,403 m) - virgin peak in Tsartse massif (Mukut Himal region), first person to ascent.
- 2008: Lhotse (8,516 m) - solo ascent, without bottled oxygen, stopped at 8,300 m.

Elsewhere:

- 1996: Cerro Cuerno (5,462 m) - first Romanian ascent, SW face.
- 2009: Gunnbjørn Fjeld (3,694 m) - first Romanian ascent; Peak Capuccino (3,256 m); Petra Peak (3,307 m) - first person to ascent, solo; Cone (3,669 m) - first Romanian ascent; Dome (3,683 m) - first Romanian ascent.

== Documentary films ==
He made several documentary films based on his mountain expedition:

- 1996: "Alison Hargreaves - Regina Everestului" ("Alison Hargreaves - Queen of the Everest")
- 1997: "Alaska - Ultima Frontiera" ("Alaska - The last frontier")
- 2003: "Țara Șerpașilor - Lumea de dincolo de nori" ("Sherpa Land - The world behind the clouds") (made with Irina Păcurariu)

== Awards ==
Sports awards:

- 1994: “Fair-Play” award by Romanian Olympic and Sports Committee for his role in a rescue attempt in Everest.
- 1999: "Sportsman of the year" (with Gabriela Szabo)

TV awards:

- 1996: best documentary film at A.P.T.R. awards for "Alison Hargreaves - Regina Everestului".
- 1998: Grand Prize for “Alaska - Ultima Frontiera” documentary at A.P.T.R. awards.
- 2004: best ethnographic documentary for "Țara Șerpașilor - Lumea de dincolo de nori" at A.P.T.R. awards.
