= 100 Greatest Romanians =

List of popular Romanians

TV show's logo

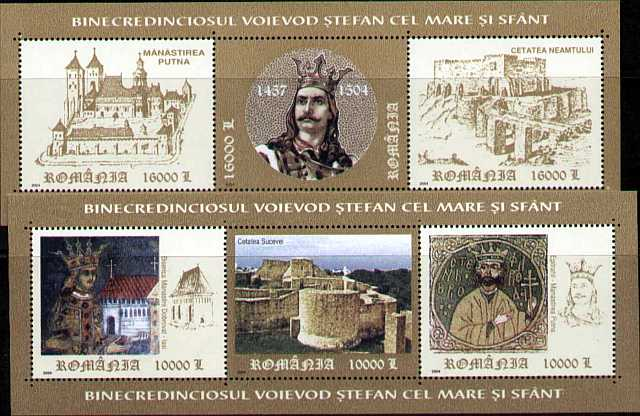
Stephen the Great, commemorated on some stamps from 2004, the winner of the contest

In 2006, the Romanian television station Romanian Television (Televiziunea Română, TVR) conducted a vote to determine whom the general public considered the 100 Greatest Romanians of all time, in a version of the British TV show 100 Greatest Britons. The resulting series, Great Romanians (Romanian: Mari Români), included individual programmes on the top ten, with viewers having further opportunities to vote after each programme. It concluded with a debate. On 21 October, TVR announced that the "greatest Romanian of all time" according to the voting was Stephen the Great.

== Top 10 ==
No	Name	Occupation
1	Stephen the Great (1435–1504)	Prince of Moldavia won renown in Europe for his long resistance to the Ottoman Turks.
2	Carol I of Romania (1839-1914)	The first Romanian ruler of the Hohenzollern-Sigmaringen dynasty (1866–1914), the first King of Romania (since 1881) after the country acquired full independence under his leadership.
3	Mihai Eminescu (1850–1889)	Late Romantic poet, widely considered to be the most influential Romanian poet.
4	Mihai Viteazul (1558–1601)	Prince of Wallachia, Prince of Moldavia, Imperial governor of Transylvania, he was the first who managed to unite in personal union the three principalities largely inhabited by Romanians.
5	Richard Wurmbrand (1909–2001)	Evangelical Christian doctor and educator who spent a total of fourteen years in communist prison.
6	Ion Antonescu (1882–1946)	Dictator of Romania during World War II
7	Mircea Eliade (1907–1986)	Researcher and professor of the history of religions, Orientalist and novelist.
8	Alexandru Ioan Cuza (1820–1873)	The first ruler of the United Principalities of Romania after the union of Moldavia and Wallachia in 1859; his reforms started the modernization of Romania.
9	Constantin Brâncuși (1876–1957)	Famous modern sculptor.
10	Nadia Comăneci (1961–)	Gymnast, winner of five Olympic gold medals, and the first to be awarded a perfect score of 10 in an Olympic gymnastic event.

== Full list ==
1. Stephen the Great
2. Carol I
3. Mihai Eminescu
4. Mihai Viteazul
5. Richard Wurmbrand
6. Ion Antonescu
7. Mircea Eliade
8. Alexandru Ioan Cuza
9. Constantin Brâncuși
10. Nadia Comăneci
11. Nicolae Ceaușescu (1918–1989) – last communist dictator of Romania
12. Vlad Țepeș (1431–1476) – Prince of Wallachia
13. Gigi Becali (1958– ) – politician and businessman, football club owner
14. Henri Coandă (1886–1972) – inventor and aerodynamics pioneer
15. Gheorghe Hagi (1965– ) – football player
16. Ion Luca Caragiale (1852–1912) – playwright and short story writer
17. Nicolae Iorga (1871–1940) – historian, writer, and politician
18. Constantin Brâncoveanu (1654–1714) – Prince of Wallachia
19. George Enescu (1881–1955) – composer and musician
20. Gregorian Bivolaru (1952– ) – founder of MISA yoga organization
21. Mirel Rădoi (1980– ) – football player
22. Corneliu Zelea Codreanu (1899–1938) – founder of the Legionary Movement, the main Romanian fascist movement during the 1930s
23. Nicolae Titulescu (1882–1941) – diplomat, president of the League of Nations
24. Ferdinand I of Romania (1865–1927) – King of Romania during World War I, who oversaw the creation of "Greater Romania"
25. Mihai I (1921–2017) – last King of Romania before communist period
26. Decebalus (87–106) – last King of Dacia before Roman conquest
27. Traian Băsescu (1951–) – politician, former President of Romania
28. Gheorghe Mureșan (1971– ) – NBA basketball player
29. Ion I. C. Brătianu (1864–1927) – liberal politician, Prime Minister of Romania for five terms
30. Răzvan Lucescu (1969– ) football player and football club manager
31. Nicolae Paulescu (1869–1931) – physiologist, one of the scientists who developed diabetes treatment with insulin
32. Iuliu Maniu (1873–1953) – politician, fought for the national rights of the Romanians of Transylvania
33. Iuliu Hossu (1885–1970) – Greek-Catholic bishop, victim of the communist regime
34. Emil Cioran (1911–1995) – philosopher, writer, and essayist
35. Avram Iancu (1824–1872) – leader of the 1848 Romanian revolution in Transylvania
36. Burebista (? – 44 BC) – King of Dacia
37. Marie of Romania (1875–1938) – Queen of Romania
38. Petre Țuțea (1902–1991) – philosopher, Christian-fascist intellectual, victim of the communist regime
39. Corneliu Coposu (1914–1995) – liberal politician, victim of the communist regime
40. Aurel Vlaicu (1882–1913) – inventor, aviation pioneer
41. Iosif Trifa (1888–1938) – Eastern Orthodox priest, founder of the "Oastea Domnului" ("Lord's Army") Christian organisation
42. Nichita Stănescu (1933–1983) – poet and essayist
43. Ion Creangă (1837–1889) – writer
44. Mădalina Manole (1967–2010) – pop singer
45. Corneliu Vadim Tudor (1949–2015) – ultranationalist politician, writer and journalist; founder and leader of the Greater Romania Party
46. Traian Vuia (1872–1950) – inventor, aviation pioneer
47. Lucian Blaga (1895–1961) – poet, playwright, and philosopher
48. George Emil Palade (1912–2008) – cell biologist, winner of the Nobel Prize for Physiology or Medicine (1974)
49. Ana Aslan (1897–1988) – biologist, physician and inventor, the author of essential research in gerontology
50. Adrian Mutu (1979– ) – football player
51. Florin Piersic (1936– ) – theater and film actor
52. Mihail Kogălniceanu (1817–1891) – politician and historian, first Prime Minister of the United Principalities of Romania
53. Iancsi Korossy (1926–2013) – jazz pianist
54. Dimitrie Cantemir (1673–1723) – Prince of Moldavia and prolific man of letters
55. Ilie Năstase (1946– ) – tennis player
56. Gheorghe Zamfir (1941– ) – musician, pan flute player
57. Gică Petrescu (1915–2006) – musician, folk and pop music composer and singer
58. Elisabeta Rizea (1912–2003) – anti-communist partisan
59. Bulă (fictional) – a stock character of Romanian jokes of the communist era
60. Amza Pellea (1931–1983) – theater and film actor
61. Matei Corvin (1443 (?) – 1490) – King of Hungary
62. Mircea cel Bătrân (1355–1418) – Prince of Wallachia
63. Titu Maiorescu (1840–1917) – literary critic and politician
64. Toma Caragiu (1925–1977) – theater and film actor
65. Mihai Trăistariu (1979– ) – pop singer
66. Andreea Marin (1974– ) – TV show host
67. Emil Racoviță (1868–1947) – biologist, co-founder of biospeleology and explorer of Antarctica
68. Victor Babeș (1854–1926) – biologist and early bacteriologist, one of the founders of microbiology
69. Nicolae Bălcescu (1819–1852) – leader of the 1848 Wallachian Revolution
70. Horia-Roman Patapievici (1957– ) – writer and essayist
71. Ion Iliescu (1930– 2025) – first President of Romania after the 1989 revolution
72. Marin Preda (1922–1980) – novelist
73. Eugen Ionescu (1909–1994) – playwright, one of the initiators of the theatre of the absurd
74. Dumitru Stăniloae (1903–1993) – Eastern Orthodox priest and theologian
75. Alexandru Todea (1905–2002) – Greek-Catholic bishop, victim of the communist regime
76. Tudor Gheorghe (1945– ) – singer and theater actor
77. Ion Țiriac (1939– ) – tennis player and businessman
78. Cleopa Ilie (1912–1998) – Eastern Orthodox archimandrite
79. Arsenie Boca (1910–1989) – Eastern Orthodox priest and theologian, victim of the communist regime
80. Bănel Nicoliță (1985– ) – football player
81. Dumitru Cornilescu (1891–1975) – Eastern Orthodox, then Protestant priest, translated the Bible into Romanian in 1921
82. Grigore Moisil (1906–1973) – mathematician and computing pioneer
83. Claudiu Niculescu (1976– ) – football player
84. Florentin Petre (1976– ) – football player
85. Marius Moga (1981– ) – pop music composer and singer
86. Nicolae Steinhardt (1912–1989) – writer
87. Laura Stoica (1967–2006) – pop and rock singer, composer and actress
88. Cătălin Hâldan (1976–2000) – football player
89. Anghel Saligny (1854–1925) – public works, chiefly railway engineer
90. Ivan Patzaichin (1949–2021) – flatwater canoer who won seven Olympic medals
91. Maria Tănase (1913–1963) – traditional and popular music singer
92. Sergiu Nicolaescu (1930–2013) – film director, actor and politician
93. Octavian Paler (1926–2007) – essayist
94. The Unknown Soldier – the Romanian soldier in the national Tomb of the Unknown Soldier
95. Ciprian Porumbescu (1853–1883) – composer
96. Nicolae Covaci (1947–2024 ) – founder of the Phoenix rock band
97. Dumitru Prunariu (1952– ) – first Romanian cosmonaut
98. Iancu de Hunedoara (c. 1387 – 1456) – Voivode of Transylvania, captain-general and regent of the Kingdom of Hungary
99. Constantin Noica (1909–1987) – philosopher and essayist
100. Badea Cârțan (1849–1911) – a shepherd who fought for the independence of the Romanians of Transylvania (then under Hungarian rule inside Austria-Hungary)

== Other editions ==
Other countries have produced similar shows; see Greatest Britons spin-offs
