= Conversations with Octavian Paler =

Conversations with Octavian Paler by Daniel Cristea-Enache was published at Corinth Publishing House days after the passing of Romanian writer and politician Octavian Paler.

== Summary ==
The book is a conversation between generations, from November 2005, when Octavian Paler had just been awarded the Opera Omnia of the Writers Union, to April 2007, the last recorded day being 29 April, just days before the writer's death. Writing to the proximity of death, Paler thought about the search for life's meaning and the maturity of old age, as in the statement: "Until old age we don’t have time to ask what is the meaning of life. We are too busy to live. At the old age we have time (even too much!) to do it, but then we face a painful discovery: life has meaning only if you’re not looking for it!" But this statement does not fade his love for life itself: "To love too much life is equal to no longer stand it."

== See also ==
- List of Romanian writers
