= Lisa, Brașov =

Lisa
- Commune
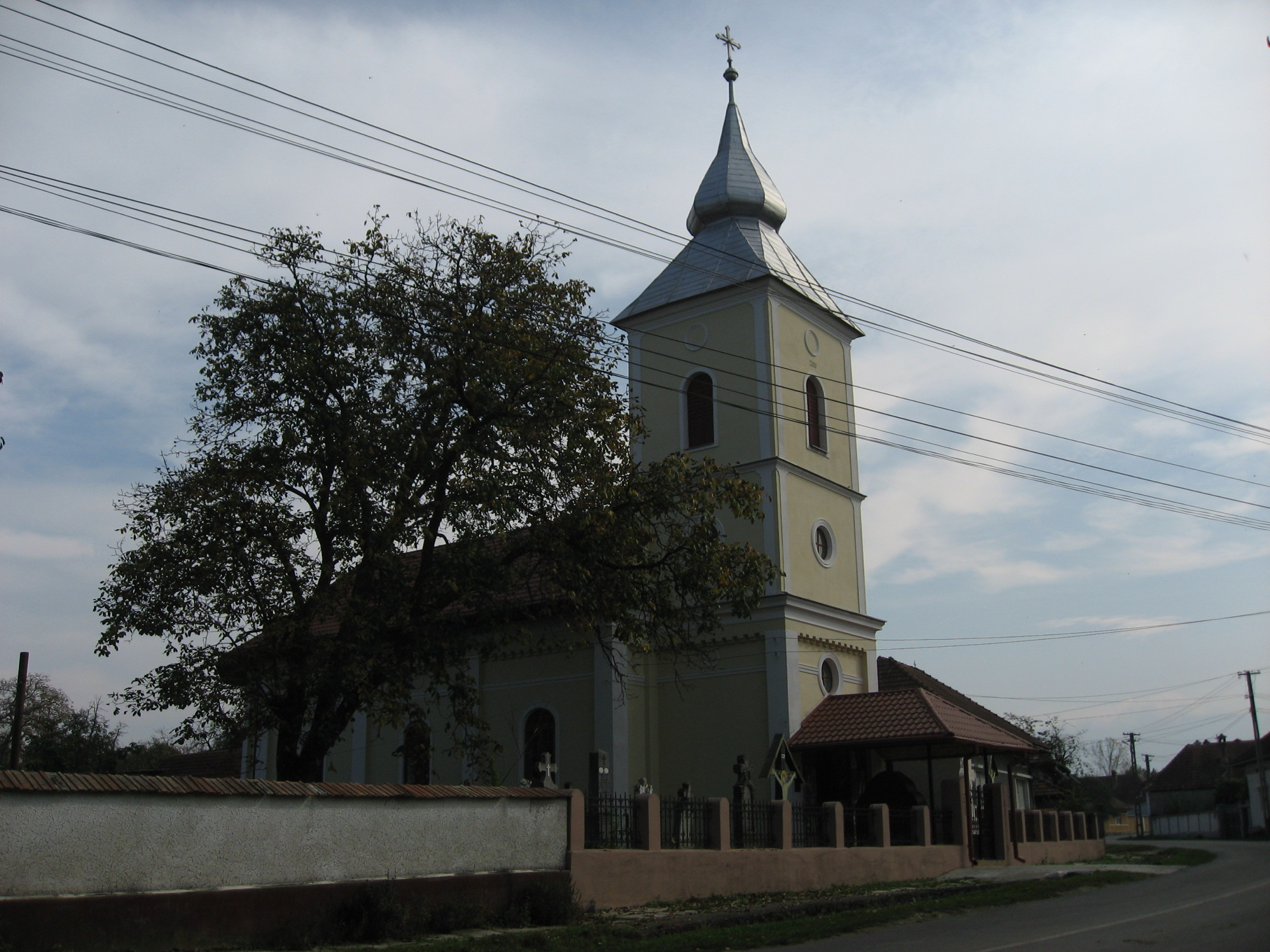
- Orthodox church in Pojorta

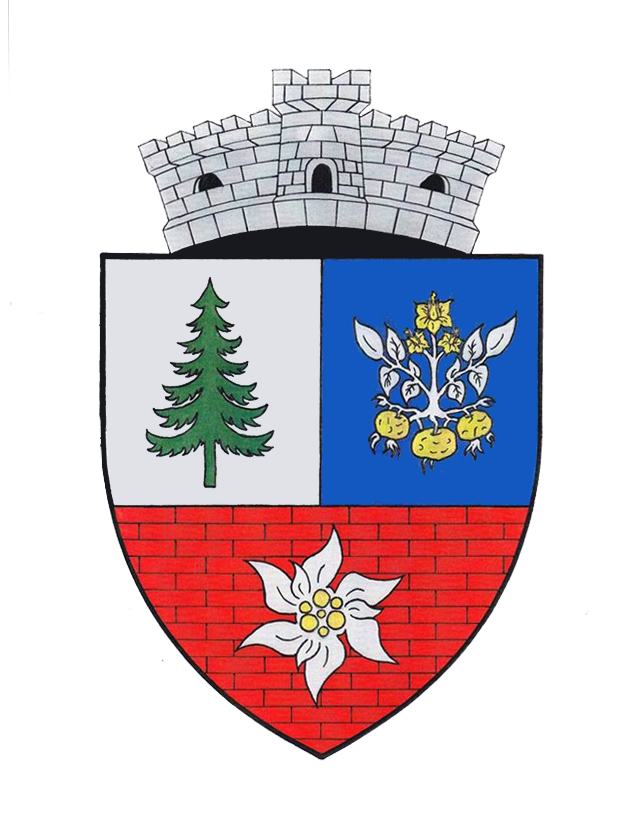
- Coat of arms

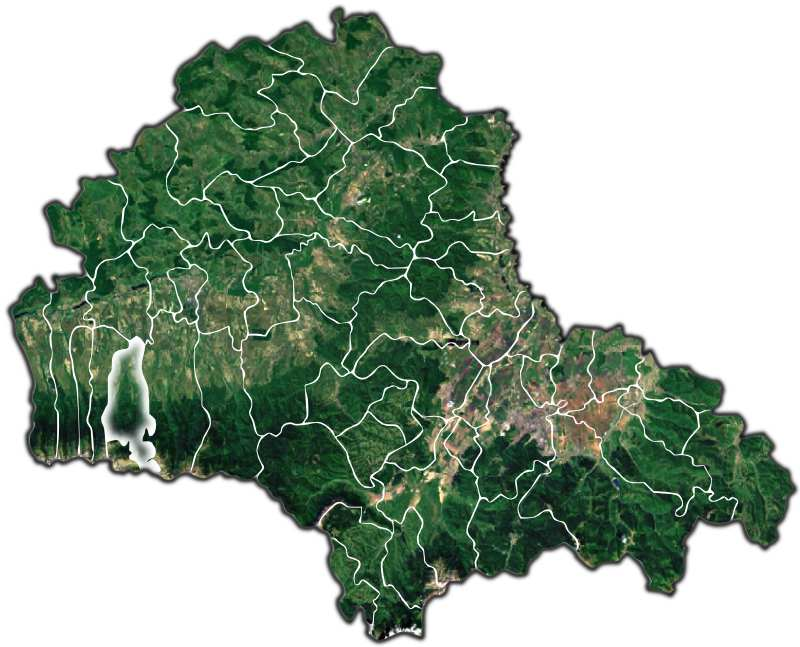
- Location in Brașov County

- Location in Romania
- Coordinates: 45°44′00″N 24°50′49″E
- Country: Romania
- County: Brașov

Government
  - Mayor (2020–2024): Gheorghe Moga (PSD)
- Area: 87.21 km^{2} (33.67 sq mi)
- Elevation: 535 m (1,755 ft)
- Population (2021-12-01): 1,800
  - Density: 21/km^{2} (53/sq mi)
- Time zone: UTC+02:00 (EET)
  - Summer (DST): UTC+03:00 (EEST)
- Postal code: 507115
- Area code: (+40) 02 68
- Vehicle reg.: BV
- Website: primaria-lisa.ro

Lisa (German: Lissa; Hungarian: Lisza) is a commune located in Brașov County, Transylvania, Romania, in the Făgăraș area. It is composed of three villages: Breaza (Breáza), Lisa and Pojorta (Posorta). The commune is well known in the area for its winter holidays customs (Ceata de Feciori).

Historical population
Year	Pop.	±%
1850	2,737	—
1910	2,985	+9.1%
2002	1,701	−43.0%
2011	1,744	+2.5%
2021	1,800	+3.2%
Source: Census data

The well-known Romanian writer Octavian Paler was born in Lisa, in 1926, where he graduated the primary school.

Lisa has a museum called La Vâltori, which hosts a 100-year-old installation for creating traditional wool blankets. The installation is powered with water from Lisa River.

Nearby Lisa a visitor can also find the Sâmbăta de Sus Monastery, and in Breaza, 4 km (2.5 mi) to the south, the remains of a medieval fortress.

During the 1950s, the village was severely oppressed by the communist regime, as a group of fighters against communism were active in the region. Many lost their lives or were imprisoned by the communist authorities. See the story of Ion Gavrilă Ogoranu, and the long list of fighters from Lisa.
