= Daniel Tătaru =

Romanian mathematician

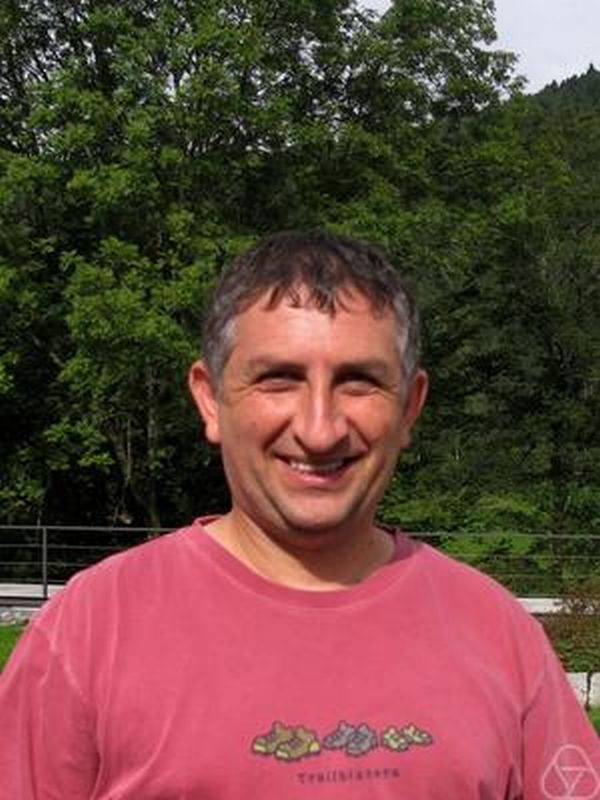
- Daniel Tătaru at Oberwolfach in 2010
- Born: May 6, 1967; Piatra Neamț, Socialist Republic of Romania
- Education: University of Iași; University of Virginia
- Awards: Bôcher Memorial Prize; National Order of Merit (Romania)
- Scientific career
- Fields: Mathematics
- Workplaces: Northwestern University; University of California, Berkeley
- Thesis: A priori pseudoconvexity energy estimates in domains with boundary and applications to exact boundary controllability for conservative P.D.E. (1992)
- Doctoral advisor: Irena Lasiecka
- Other academic advisors: Viorel P. Barbu
- Website: math.berkeley.edu/~tataru/

Daniel Ioan Tătaru (born 6 May 1967) is a Romanian mathematician at University of California, Berkeley.

He was born in Piatra Neamț. As a student at the Petru Rareș High School, he won the National Mathematical Olympiad three times and the International Mathematical Olympiad twice. He then studied mathematics at the University of Iași. His 1990 diploma thesis, supervised by Viorel P. Barbu, was on Hamilton–Jacobi equations in Banach spaces and nonlinear semigroups; it won the Gheorghe Țițeica Prize from the Romanian Academy of Sciences. Tătaru earned his doctorate from the University of Virginia in 1992, under supervision of Irena Lasiecka. The next year he joined the faculty at Northwestern University and in 2001 he moved to Berkeley.

He won the 2002 Bôcher Memorial Prize for his research on partial differential equations. In 2003, he was awarded the Romanian Order of Merit, Commander rank. In 2012 he became a fellow of the American Mathematical Society. In 2013 he was selected as a Simons Investigator in mathematics. In 2023, he was elected honorary member of the Romanian Academy.
