= Octavian Paler =

Romanian writer and politician (1926–2007)

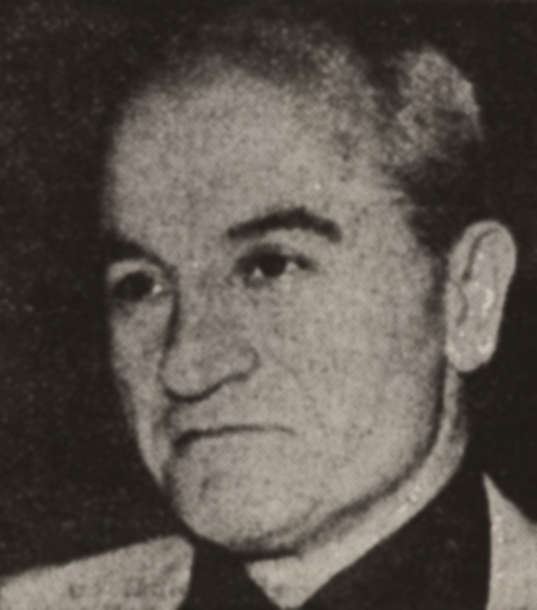
Paler in 1982

Octavian Paler (Romanian pronunciation: [oktaviˈan ˈpalər] or [ˈpaler]; 2 July 1926 – 7 May 2007) was a Romanian writer, journalist, politician in Communist Romania, and civil society activist in post-1989 Romania.

== Education ==
Paler was born on 2 July 1926 in Lisa, Brașov County. He was educated at Spiru Haret High School in Bucharest. In the summer of 1944, one week before graduating the 7th grade, he was forced to leave the school because of an argument with his uncle and Spiru Haret's school headmaster George Șerban. Octavian Paler moved on to Radu Negru High School in Făgăraș, where he studied literature for his final examination. He graduated in 1945 with magna cum laude and outstanding results in philosophy, Latin and Greek. He sat the final examination in Sibiu in the same year. Paler went on to study Philosophy and Law at the University of Bucharest between 1945 and 1949.

== Political activity ==
Paler was a substitute member in the Central Committee of the Romanian Communist Party from 1974 to 1979, and a member of the Great National Assembly for the Vaslui constituency from 1980 to 1985. However, he was persecuted by the Romanian secret service agency, the Securitate, because of his pro-western views and criticism of the Romanian Communist Party, including Nicolae Ceaușescu. He was not allowed to leave his home and suffered restrictions in his artistic work.

After the Romanian Revolution and the fall of Ceaușescu in 1989, Paler continued his anti-communist activity as a founding member of the Group for Social Dialogue (Grupul de Dialog Social), together with Ana Blandiana and Gabriel Liiceanu amongst others. During his last years he was an intense critic of Romanian politicians and politics.

== Journalism ==
The bulk of his career occurred during the Communist regime, as journalist at the Romanian Radio from 1949 to 1961, vice-president of the Romanian Radio and TV Broadcasting committee from 1965 to 1970, and president of the Romanian Journalists Council in 1976. He worked as a Senior Editor at the influential newspaper România Liberă from 1970 to 1983.

After 1989, Paler received public appreciation for his journalistic work and political activism and was appointed as the chief editor of România Liberă. He also published with Cotidianul and Ziua, and made appearances on public TV discussing politics and morality.

== Death ==
Paler died of a heart attack on 7 May 2007 at the age of 80, and was buried with military honours in the Sfânta Vineri Cemetery in Bucharest.

Conversations with Octavian Paler was published by Daniel Cristea-Enache days after his death. In his memory, a street in Făgăraș, the school in his native village, Lisa, and the municipal library in Făgăraș bear his name.

== Bibliography ==
- Umbra cuvintelor (Shadow Of Words) – 1970
- Drumuri prin memorie I (Egipt, Grecia) (Roads Through Memory I – Egypt, Greece) – 1972
- Drumuri prin memorie II (Italia) (Roads Through Memory II – Italy) – 1974
- Mitologii subiective (Subjective Mythologies) – 1975
- Apărarea lui Galilei (Galileo's Defense) – 1978
- Scrisori imaginare (Imaginary Letters) – 1979
- Caminante – 1980
- Viața pe un peron (Life On A Station Platform) – 1981
- Polemici cordiale (Cordial Polemics) - 1983
- Un om norocos (A Lucky Man) - 1984
- Un muzeu in labirint (A Museum in the labyrinth) - 1986 - (renamed by the author as "Eul detestabil"-"The detestable I" after 1995)
- Viața ca o coridă (Life As A Bullfight) - 1987
- Don Quijote în est (Don Quixote In The East) - 1993
- Vremea întrebărilor (Time Of Questions) - 1995
- Aventuri solitare (Solitary Adventures) - 1996
- Deșertul pentru totdeauna (Desert Forever) - 2001
- Autoportret într-o oglindă spartă (Self-Portrait In A Broken Mirror) – 2004
- Calomnii mitologice (Mythological Slander) – 2007
- Caminante. Jurnal și contrajurnal mexican (Caminante. A Mexican Diary And Counter-Diary) – 2010 (second edition)
- Eul detestabil (The Repugnant Self) - 2010
- Rugați-vă să nu vă crească aripi (Pray That You Don't Grow Wings) - 2010
- Definitions (poetry) 2011 also published into English by Istros Books London.

== Trivia ==
Octavian Paler came in 93rd in a poll conducted by TVR to find the "greatest Romanians of all time" in 2006.

== See also ==
- Conversations with Octavian Paler
