= Gheorghe Manoliu =

Romanian general

- Born: 21 May 1888; Piatra Neamț, Neamț County, Kingdom of Romania
- Died: 28 August 1980 (aged 92); Bucharest, Socialist Republic of Romania
- Education: Carol I National Defence University
- Military career
- Allegiance: Romania
- Branch: Romanian Army
- Service years: 1909–1945
- Rank: Major general
- Commands: 4th Mountain Division
- Conflicts: Second Balkan War; World War I; World War II; Eastern Front; Operation München; Battle of the Sea of Azov; Crimean Campaign; Siege of Sevastopol
- Awards: Order of the Crown; Order of Michael the Brave; Knight's Cross of the Iron Cross; Order of the Star of Romania

Gheorghe Manoliu (21 May 1888 – 28 August 1980) was a Romanian major general during World War II.

== Biography ==
He was born in 1888 in Piatra Neamț, the son of Vasile and Andromaca Manoliu, both civil servants, originally from the Ceahlău region. After graduating from Petru Rareș High School in his native city, he attended the Infantry School for Officers in Bucharest, graduating in 1909 with the rank of second lieutenant. Promoted to lieutenant in 1912, he served in 1913 in the Second Balkan War. After Romania entered World War I in August 1916 on the side of the Allies, Manoliu fought in the Romanian Campaign of 1916, commanding an infantry battalion. He fought in the Battle of Transylvania and then at First Battle of Oituz. He was promoted to captain in May 1917 and, after distinguishing himself at the Third Battle of Oituz, to major in September 1917.

After the war, he studied from 1919 to 1921 at the Higher War School in Bucharest. In 1925 he advanced to the rank of lieutenant colonel and took command of the 12th Mountain Battalion. After 5 years he became commanding officer of the Vânători de munte troops stationed in Sighetu Marmației and Satu Mare. Promoted to colonel in 1933, he served from 1934 to 1938 as commander of the 15th Infantry Regiment, based in Piatra Neamț. After advancing to brigadier general in 1938, he was appointed in 1939 commander of the 2nd Mixed Brigade Vânători de munte, garrisoned at Bistrița. In January 1941 he took command of the 4th Mixed Brigade.

In June 1941 Manoliu's brigade was relocated from Transylvania to an area north of Suceava. On June 22, Romania joined Operation Barbarossa in order to reclaim the lost territories of Bessarabia and Northern Bukovina, which had been annexed by the Soviet Union in June 1940. At the start of Operation München, on July 2, 1941, the 2nd Mixed Brigade passed to the attack in the direction Vicovu de Sus–Cernăuți–Hotin. On July 17, the brigade crossed the Dniester River at Ojeva, and then advanced towards the Bug River, in the direction Vapniarka–Voznesensk. After fighting at Mala Biloserka and Vladimirovka in late September, his brigade was tasked to secure the northern coastline of the Azov Sea during the Battle of the Sea of Azov. In November 1941, the 4th Mixed Brigade was reassigned to the Crimean Campaign. Manoliu spent New Year's Eve near the frontline, in a bombed-out hut, sharing with cavalry colonel Haralambie Fortunescu canned rations sprinkled with champagne.

In March 1942 the brigade was reorganized as the 4th Mountain Division and Manoliu was promoted to major general. On June 27, his division took the heavily fortified Red Army positions at Kegel in the Sakharnaya Golovka area (the last Soviet strong point in the Gaitani massif), during the last phase of the Siege of Sevastopol. The final assault was launched on July 1, with street combat lasting until July 4, when the remaining Soviet defenses were overrun and all organized resistance collapsed. Starting in September 1942, the 4th Mountain Division had the mission to secure and defend the Black Sea coastline of the Crimea, first from Feodosia to Simferopol, and later from Feodosia to Kerch.

In March 1943 Manoliu returned to Romania, and was named commander of the 4th Regional Corps, a position he held until March 1945, when he retired from the Army. In February 1949 he was condemned to 45 years imprisonment as a war criminal. In 1950 he was detained at Aiud Prison and in 1952–1954 at Jilava Prison, after which he was released. His wife, Otilia, was also arrested and detained at Jilava in 1953. Manoliu died in Bucharest in 1980.

A street in Vatra Dornei bears his name.

== Awards ==
- Order of the Crown of Romania, Commander Class on 9 May 1941.
- Order of Michael the Brave, 3rd Class on 17 October 1941.
- Knight's Cross of the Iron Cross on 30 August 1942 as Divisions-General of the 4th Romanian Mountain Division.
- Order of the Star of Romania, Officer class, 1943
