= Bulă =

Fictional stock character of Romanian humor

Bulă (Romanian pronunciation: [ˈbulə]) is a fictional stock character of Romanian humor.

Bulă, a young buffoon and trickster, was "born" during the Nicolae Ceaușescu regime of Communist Romania. The name, among other interpretations, is a one-letter deformation of "pulă", a Romanian vulgar slang for "penis". Bulă is young, different, funny, has an attitude, and has an answer for everything. He can be a modest hero or fail with dignity. He can be a genius, a prankster or just stupid, but always with a twist. Bulă is partly inspired by the folklore characters Păcală and Tândală, or more modern prank caharacters Ițic and Ștrul. Some of the jokes were a direct poke at the communist regime.

Silvian Centiu, commenting on his show, A Transylvanian in Silicon Valley, wrote: "When in San Francisco and in New York I mentioned Bula, the omnipresent character in Romanian jokes, I was delighted to hear audience members laugh before I finished the joke – I knew they were Romanians."

In 2006, TVR conducted a vote to determine whom the general public considers the 100 Greatest Romanians of all time. Bulă was voted to be the 59th greatest Romanian.

== Sample Bulă jokes ==
At school: "Children, who can tell what is the main goal of Socialism?" Bulă raises his hand. The teacher groans, "Oh no, Bulă, none of your nonsense." – "But I do know the answer! The main goal of socialism is the well-being and happiness of the man... And I even know who this man is."

Bulă's April Fool's Day joke: "Mommy, mommy! Dad hung himself in the garage!" – The mother rushes to the garage, finds nothing, and Bulă is laughing. – "Ha-ha fooled you! He hung himself in the attic."

Bulă was walking down the street one day and a man asked him: "Bulă, where are you going?" – "Huh, how do you know I'm not coming?"

== See also ==
- Vasya Pupkin, a Russian "average person", was voted the second most popular Russian politician, after Vladimir Putin
