= Breaza (Olt) =

- Location within Romania

Location
- Country: Romania
- Counties: Brașov County
- Villages: Breaza, Pojorta, Voivodeni, Voila

Physical characteristics
- Source: Făgăraș Mountains
- Mouth: Olt
  - location: Voila
  - coordinates: 45.8175°N 24.8214°E
- Length: 33 km (21 mi)
- Basin size: 65 km^{2} (25 sq mi)

Basin features
- Progression: Olt→ Danube→ Black Sea
- Tributaries
  - left: Brescioara

The Breaza is a left tributary of the river Olt in Romania. It discharges into the Olt in Voila. The source of the Breaza is in the Făgăraș Mountains. Its length is 33 km (21 mi) and its basin size is 65 km^{2} (25 sq mi).
