= Romanian humour =

Humour of the Romanian ethnic group

Romanian humour, like many other Romanian cultural aspects, has many affinities with four other groups: the Latins (namely the French and Italians), the Balkan people (Greeks, the Slavs, and Turks), the Germans and the Hungarians.

== Characters ==
The earliest Romanian character found in anecdotes is Păcală. His name is derived from a (se) păcăli ('to fool oneself/somebody') and, since this word cannot be found in any other related language, we can safely assume that his name is part of the pure Romanian humour.

The Ottoman influence brought the Balkan spirit and with it, other characters and situations. Anton Pann's character, Nastratin Hogea, is a classic example of an urban tradesman. As Jewish people settled in many Romanian regions, two other characters joined Romanian humour: Ițic and Ștrul, a pair of cunning Jews, mainly seen as ingenious, but avaricious shopkeepers.

With modernization and urbanization, especially during the Communist regime, Romanians needed a new character, different from the traditional Păcală, and he was found in Bulă, the tragicomic absolute idiot. In 2006 Bulă was voted the 59th greatest Romanian.

With the fall of communism and facing capitalism, a new kind of joke became popular: that of Alinuţa, a sadistic and stupid 10-year-old girl. Example: Alinuţa: "Mum, I don't like grandma." Mum: "Shut up, we eat what we have!"

Other popular characters are Ion and Maria, a pair of young married or engaged innocent peasants, sometimes depicted as gypsies. Almost all jokes including them are sexually oriented. Another well-known character is Badea Gheorghe, mainly depicted as an old shepherd with a very simplistic view of life, death and material possessions. The newest character is Dorel, the archetype of a careless construction worker, engineer or electrician. Originally the name of a clumsy and ill-experienced worker from a series of TV adverts, Dorel is often depicted as the sole author of weird construction works as door-less balconies or even stairs leading to nowhere or as the cause of blunders leading to comic incidents.

== Politics ==
Especially during the communist regime, political jokes were very popular, although they were illegal and dangerous to tell. In the democratic Romania, these jokes are still popular, although the themes changed: now the politicians are seen either, as hopelessly corrupt, greedy, or as nationalist madmen.

As Ben Lewis put it in his essay, "Communism was a humor-producing machine. Its economic theories and system of repression created inherently funny situations. There were jokes under fascism and Nazism too, but those systems did not create an absurd, laugh-a-minute reality like communism."

In Ceaușescu's time, a line is forming around the street's corner. A man passing by sees it and asks the last one in line: "What do they sell here?" "I have no idea", he replies, "go ask someone ahead". The man goes to the middle of the line and asks another person: "What do they sell here?" "I have no idea", the answer comes and he is sent farther ahead to seek for an answer. The man goes straight to the first person in line and asks him: "What do they sell here?" The other one answers: "Nothing, I just felt sick and took support on this wall." "Well then, why are you still here?", the man asked. "Because I've never been the first in such a long line", the answer came.

Bill Clinton, Boris Yeltsin and Ion Iliescu are invited to see an airplane built entirely out of gold. They are told that they can enter it and look around for as long as they like, but they can't take anything. Clinton goes first, stays five minutes, upon his exit the metal detector blares; Clinton had taken a screw and a nail with him. Yeltsin goes second, stays five minutes, upon his exit the metal detector blares again; Yeltsin had stolen a fistful of screws. Finally, Iliescu enters the plane, and stays there five minutes. And another five minutes. And another... Suddenly, the plane takes off.

Radio Yerevan: just like in the most countries of the former Eastern bloc, Radio Yerevan jokes were popular during the communist times.
