= Breazova =

Breazova may refer to several places in Romania:

- Breazova, a village in Sarmizegetusa Commune, Hunedoara County
- Breazova, a village in Margina Commune, Timiș County
- Breazova, a tributary of the Bârzava in Caraș-Severin County
- Breazova (Râul Galben), a river in Hunedoara County

== See also ==
- Breaza (disambiguation)
