= Zambada =

Zambada is a surname. Notable people with the surname include:

- Ismael Zambada García (born 1948), Mexican drug lord
- Serafín Zambada Ortiz (born 1990), U.S.-born Mexican drug trafficker
- Vicente Zambada Niebla (born 1975), Mexican drug trafficker
