= Voila, Brașov =

Voila
- Commune
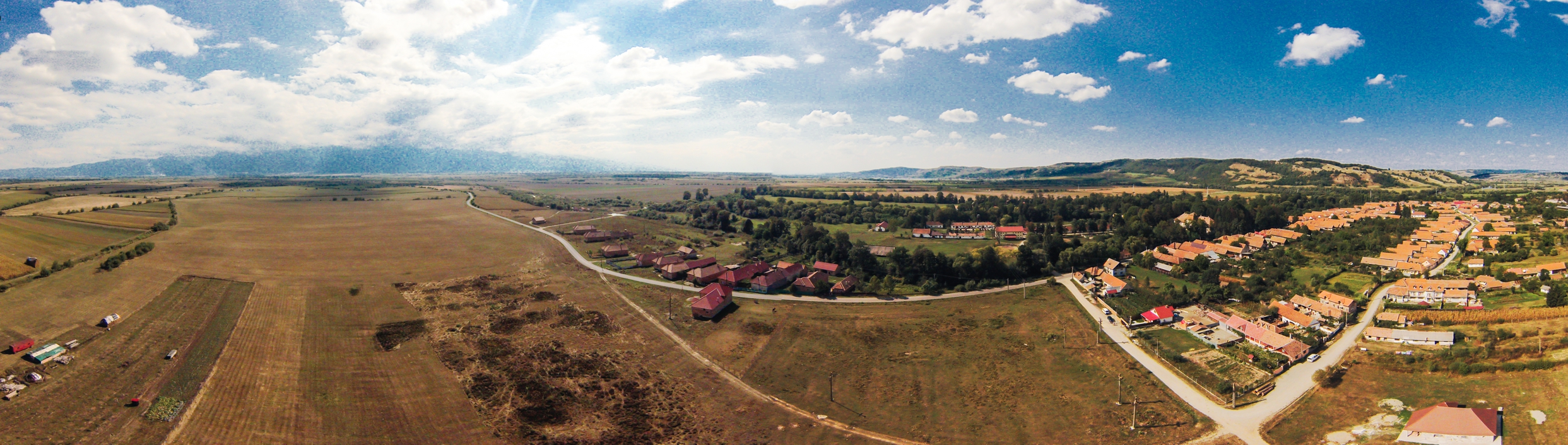
- Aerial view of Sâmbăta de Jos and the Făgăraș Mountains

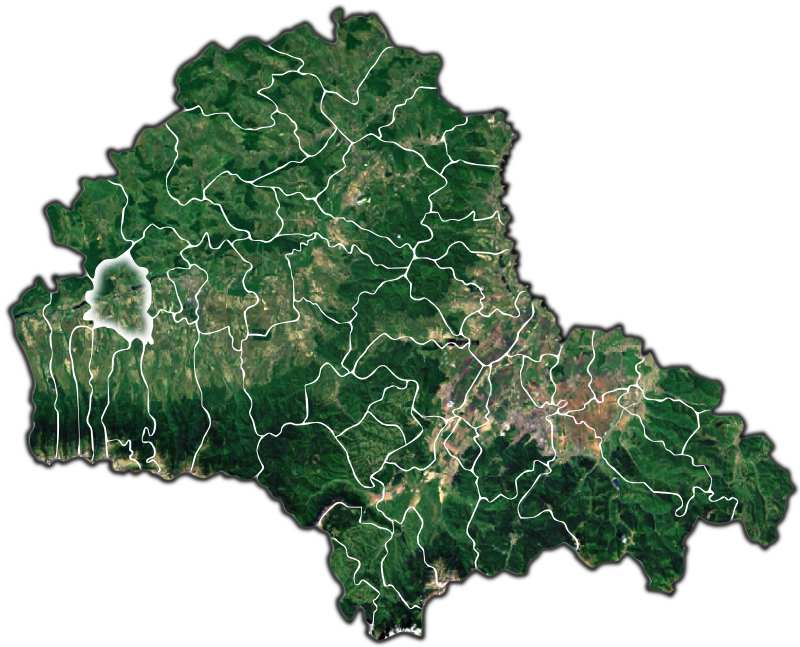
- Location within the county

- Location in Romania
- Coordinates: 45°49′N 24°51′E
- Country: Romania
- County: Brașov

Government
  - Mayor (2020–2024): Gheorghe-Marian Osalciuc (PNL)
- Area: 68.80 km^{2} (26.56 sq mi)
- Highest elevation: 440 m (1,440 ft)
- Lowest elevation: 420 m (1,380 ft)
- Population (2021-12-01): 2,863
  - Density: 41.61/km^{2} (107.8/sq mi)
- Time zone: UTC+02:00 (EET)
  - Summer (DST): UTC+03:00 (EEST)
- Postal code: 507260
- Area code: (+40) 02 68
- Vehicle reg.: BV
- Website: comunavoila.ro

Voila (German: Wolldorf; Hungarian: Voila) is a commune in Brașov County, Transylvania, Romania. It is composed of six villages: Cincșor (Kleinschenk; Kissink), Dridif (Dridif), Ludișor (Ludisor), Sâmbăta de Jos (Untermühlendorf; Alsószombatfalva), Voila, and Voivodeni (Nagyvajdafalva). It included Sâmbăta de Sus and Stațiunea Climaterică Sâmbăta villages until 2003, when these were split off to form Sâmbăta de Sus commune.

The Voila commune is located in the western part of the county, in the historic Țara Făgărașului region, on the left bank of the river Olt. The rivers Breaza and Sâmbăta discharge into the Olt at Voila. The Voila Hydropower Plant on the Olt River has a reservoir with a capacity of 10.3 million cubic metres (13.5×10^{6} cu yd) of water, which covers an area of 281.5 hectares (696 acres).

The commune is traversed by the DN1 road; it is 11 km (6.8 mi) west of Făgăraș and 67 km (42 mi) east of Sibiu. Of note is the Cincșor fortified church, which dates from the 13th century.

Historical population
Year	Pop.	±%
1850	5,717	—
1910	6,860	+20.0%
1941	6,377	−7.0%
1977	6,168	−3.3%
1992	4,794	−22.3%
2002	4,618	−3.7%
2011	2,660	−42.4%
2021	2,863	+7.6%
Source: Census data
