= János Kőrössy =

János Kőrössy (Cluj 26 December 1926 – Bucharest 21 January 2013) was a Romanian-American (naturalized) jazz musician of Hungarian descent. He was a piano player, composer and arranger.

He was born to an ethnic Hungarian family in Cluj. His first manager was pianist and conductor Teodor Cosma,father of film music composer Vladimir Cosma, of whom he said, "I owe him everything, and for me the beginning is everything, the rest comes by itself." Kőrössy was noted for combining the musical language typical of jazz with elements of local folk music, a trend referred to as ethno jazz. He arranged in jazz-style George Enescu's Romanian Rhapsody No. 1.

Kőrössy's first name is spelled in many different ways: Hansel, Jancy, Jancsy, Iancsi, Yancy and Yancey. He became a well known jazz musician in the European Eastern bloc in the 1960s, appearing at the International Jazz Festivals in Prague (1960), Warsaw (1961) and Budapest (1962). In 1969 he moved to West Germany and subsequently relocated to the United States, settling in Atlanta, Georgia. He played in Atlanta and in 1981 performed with Zoot Sims. After the Romanian Revolution, he returned to Romania, appearing in 1993 at the Costineşti and Galaţi jazz festivals and 2001 at the International Jazz Festival in Bucharest.
