= Ecrasite =

Explosive material

Ecrasite is an explosive material which is unaffected by moisture, shock or fire. It is a mixture of ammonium salts of cresol, phenol and various nitrocresols and nitrophenols principally trinitrocresol and picric acid. It was invented in 1888-1889 by two Austrian engineers named Siersch and Kubin, and used in Austria-Hungary to load artillery shells. Ecrasite was patented secretly, and its composition was once unknown.

Ecrasite is prepared by the partial nitration of a crude mixture of cresol and phenol with a mixture of concentrated sulfuric and nitric acids and the neutralisation of the product with ammonia to produce a crude salt similar to ammonium picrate.

Ecrasite is a bright yellow solid. It is waxy to touch and melts at about 100 °C. When subjected to open flame, it burns without detonation, unless confined. It is insensitive to friction. It requires a detonator for initiation. Its general adoption was hindered by several unexplained explosions during loading into shells, which might have been caused by creation of unstable metal salts of trinitrocresol and/or trinitrophenol when the explosive came in contact with metals or alloys such as copper, brass (widely used for manufacturing detonator parts) and possibly other ones.
