= Petru Rareș National College (Piatra Neamț) =

Coordinates: 46.93332°N 26.3698°E

Petru Rareș National College Romanian: Colegiul Național Petru Rareș

Location
- 4 Ștefan cel Mare Street; Piatra Neamț, Neamț County; Romania

Information
- Principal: Monica Calotă
- Website: www.cnpetrurares.ro

The Petru Rareș National College (Colegiul Național Petru Rareș) is the oldest high school in Piatra Neamț, Romania, located at 4 Ștefan cel Mare Street. At the 2024 evaluation of Romanian secondary schools, it came in 15th place, with a score of 9.41/10.

The school building dates to 1890–1892, and is classified as a historic monument by Romania's Ministry of Culture and Religious Affairs.

== Alumni ==
- Dumitru Almaș
- Dumitru Coroamă
- Ilie Crețulescu
- Nicolae Dăscălescu
- Constantin Lăcătușu
- Gheorghe Manoliu
- Gheorghe Răscănescu
- Daniel Tătaru
