= Babis Mta =

Mountain on the border of Georgia and Russia

Donguzorun
- Babis Mta
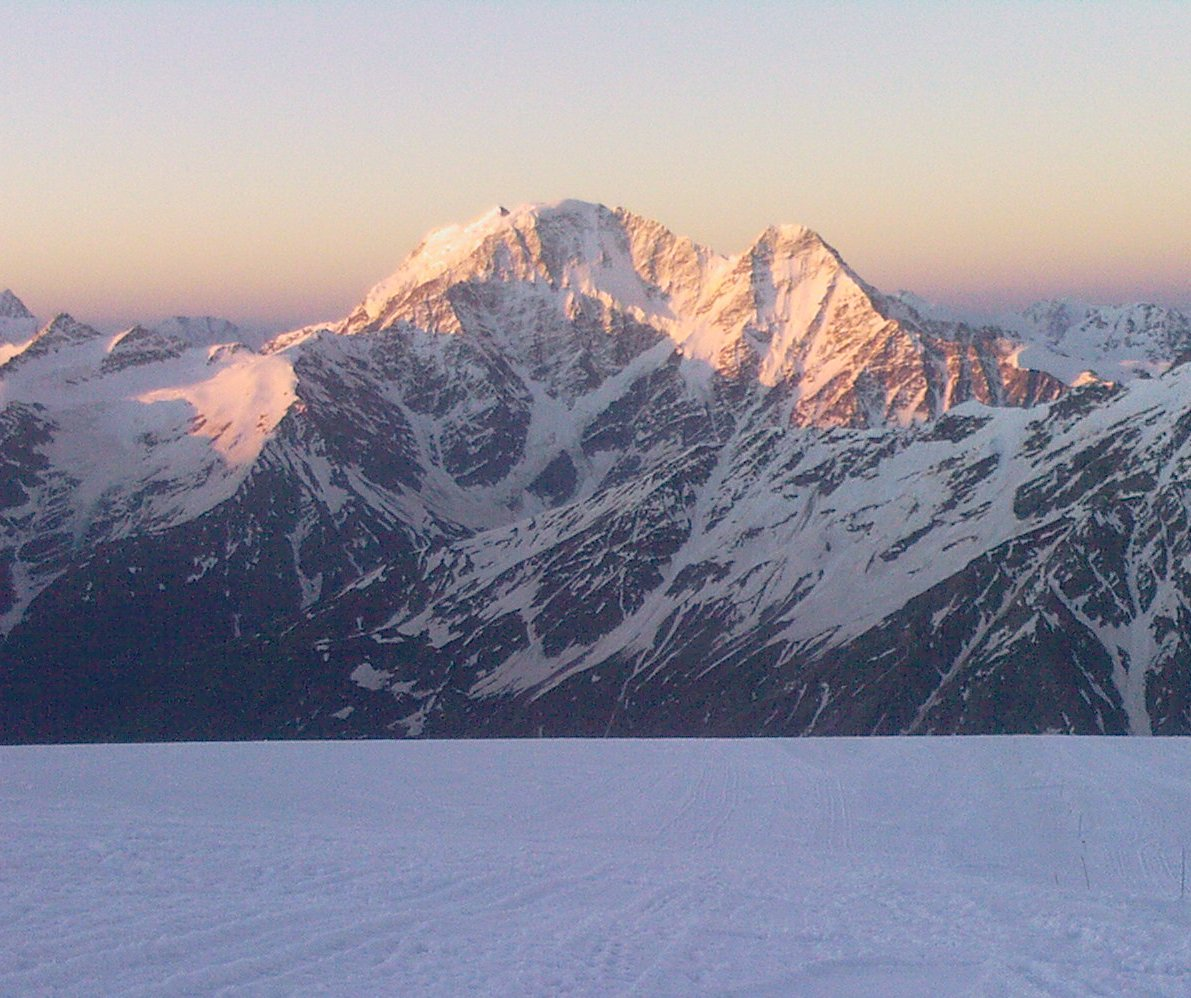
- View of Donguzorun from the Slope of Mt. Elbrus

Highest point
- Elevation: 4,454 m (14,613 ft)
- Prominence: 1,087 m (3,566 ft)
- Isolation: 14.06 km (8.74 mi)
- Listing: Ribu
- Coordinates: 43°11′41″N 42°30′54″E

Geography
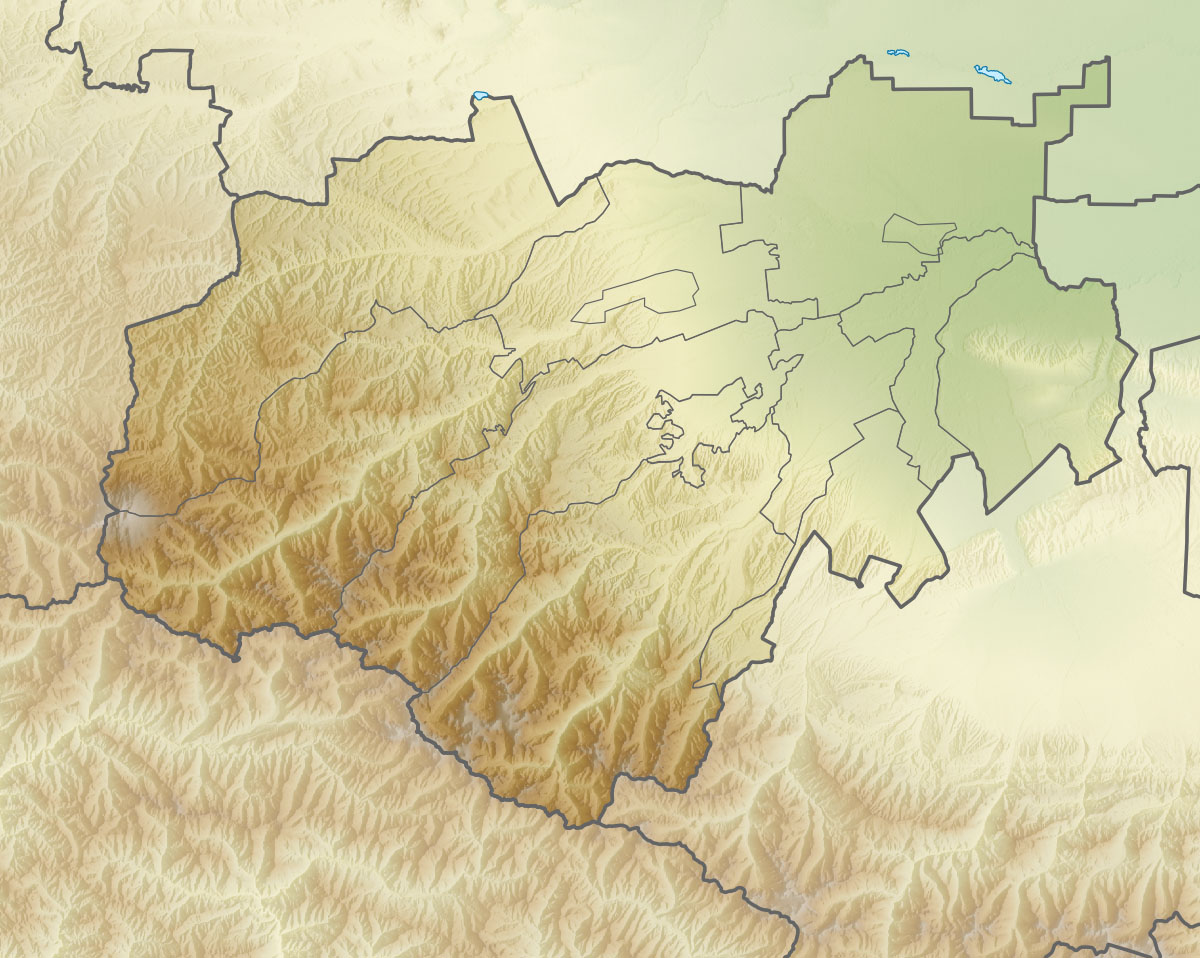
- Location within Samegrelo-Zemo Svaneti Location within Kabardino-Balkaria
- Location: Svaneti, Georgia; Kabardino-Balkaria, Russia
- Countries: Georgia and Kabardino-Balkaria
- Parent range: Caucasus Mountains

Climbing
- First ascent: South-east Peak, On August 17, 1888, Messrs. W. F. Donkin and H. Fox, with K. Streich and J. Fischer of Meiringen

Donguzorun (Russian: Донгузорун, Донгузорун-Чегет-Карабаши́, Georgian: ბაბისმთა, Babis Mta) is a peak in the central part of the Main Caucasian Range. The mountain is located on the border of Georgia and Kabardino-Balkaria, Russia. The elevation of the mountain is 4,454 metres (14,613 ft) above sea level. The Tsalgmili Range branches off from the southern flank of the mountain. The glaciers of Ledeshdvi, Dolra and Donguzorun descend from the slopes of Babis Mta.

== History ==
Donguzorun, or more precisely its eastern peak, was first climbed on August 7, 1888 by the British mountaineer W.F. Donkin and his companions.
