= Sâmbăta (river) =

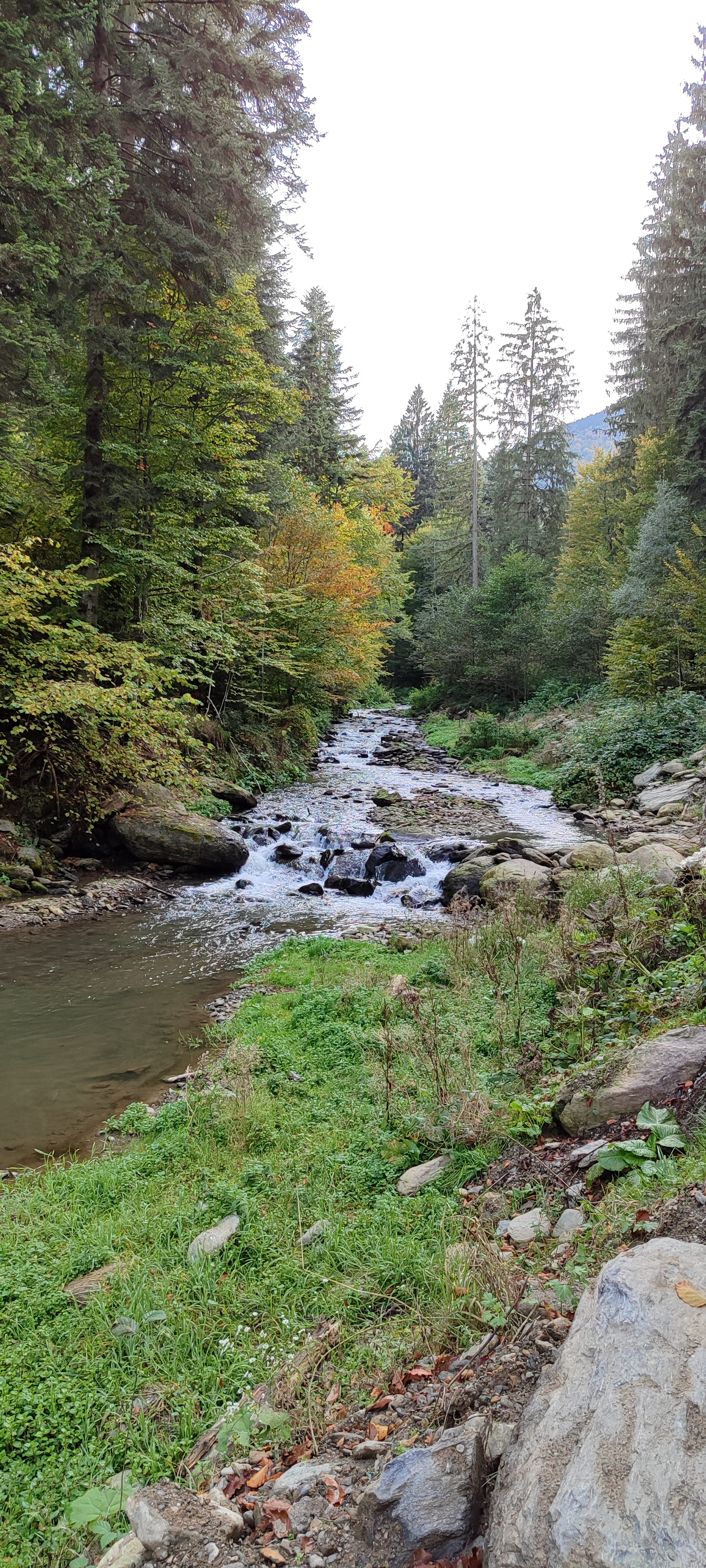

- Location within Romania

Location
- Country: Romania
- Counties: Brașov County
- Villages: Sâmbăta de Sus, Sâmbăta de Jos

Physical characteristics
- Source: Făgăraș Mountains
- Mouth: Olt
  - location: Sâmbăta de Jos
  - coordinates: 45.8161°N 24.8165°E
- Length: 26 km (16 mi)
- Basin size: 75 km^{2} (29 sq mi)

Basin features
- Progression: Olt→ Danube→ Black Sea
- Tributaries
  - right: Piatra Caprei, Pârâul Izvor, Lisa

The Sâmbăta is a left tributary of the river Olt in Romania. It discharges into the Olt in Sâmbăta de Jos. Its length is 26 km (16 mi) and its basin size is 75 km^{2} (29 sq mi).
