= Sâmbăta de Sus =

- Commune
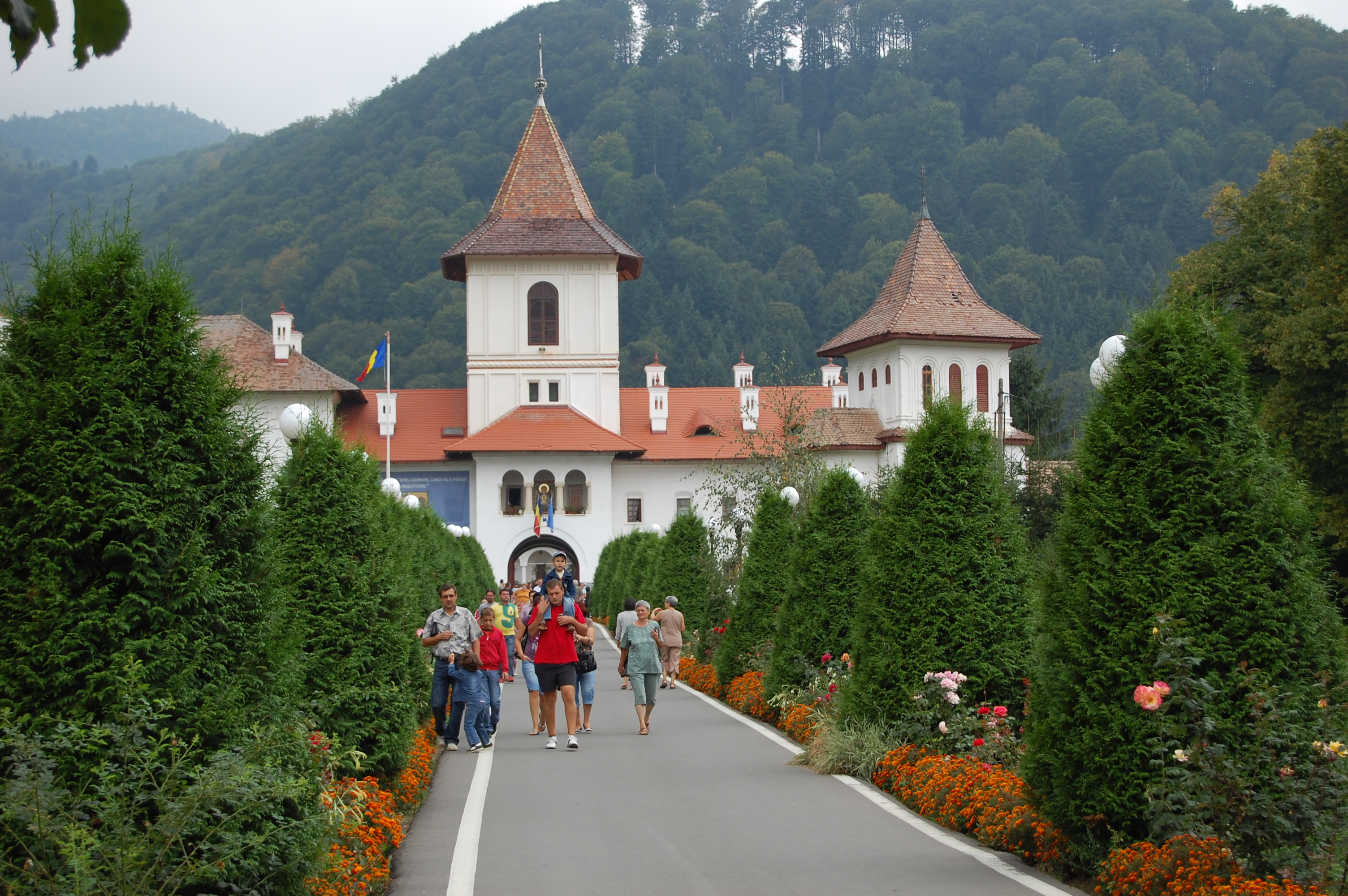
- Brâncoveanu Monastery

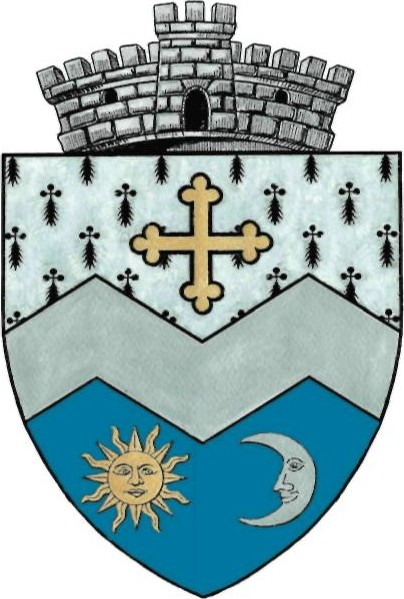
- Coat of arms

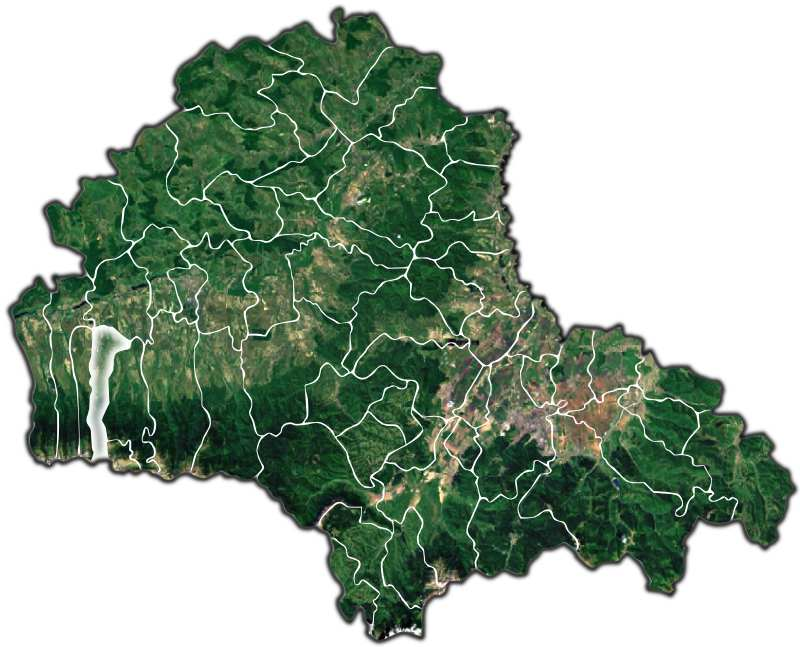
- Location within the county

- Location in Romania
- Coordinates: 45.75°N 24.8167°E
- Country: Romania
- County: Brașov

Government
  - Mayor (2020–2024): Nicolae Morariu (PNL)
- Area: 47.26 km^{2} (18.25 sq mi)
- Elevation: 490 m (1,610 ft)
- Population (2021-12-01): 1,610
  - Density: 34.1/km^{2} (88.2/sq mi)
- Time zone: UTC+02:00 (EET)
  - Summer (DST): UTC+03:00 (EEST)
- Postal code: 507266
- Area code: (+40) 02 68
- Vehicle reg.: BV
- Website: primariasambatadesus.ro

Sâmbăta de Sus (German: Obermühlendorf; Hungarian: Felsőszombatfalva) is a commune in Brașov County, Transylvania, Romania. It is composed of two villages, Sâmbăta de Sus and Stațiunea Climaterică Sâmbăta (Felsőszombatfalvi üdülőtelep). Formerly part of Voila commune, these villages were split off to form a separate commune in 2003.

== Geography ==
Sâmbăta de Sus is located in the western part of the county, on the northern slopes of the Făgăraș Mountains, in the historic Țara Făgărașului region. It lies 19 km (12 mi) southwest of Făgăraș, 85 km (53 mi) northwest of the county seat, Brașov, and 70 km (43 mi) east of Sibiu. The river Sâmbăta flows north through the commune, discharging into the Olt River in Sâmbăta de Jos.

The commune is traversed by county road DJ104A, which connects Șinca commune, 32 km (20 mi) to the east, to the town of Victoria, 12 km (7.5 mi) to the west. County road DJ105B runs from Sâmbăta de Sus to Sâmbăta de Jos, 6 km (3.7 mi) to the north, where it ends in national road DN1.

The early 18th-century Sâmbăta de Sus Monastery (also known as the Brâncoveanu Monastery) is located in Stațiunea Climaterică Sâmbăta village. The monastery was designed in the Brâncovenesc style, and construction was sponsored by Prince Constantin Brâncoveanu, of the Ottoman-dominated Principality of Wallachia.

== Demographics ==
Historical population
Year	Pop.	±%
1850	1,632	—
1920	1,571	−3.7%
1941	1,912	+21.7%
1977	2,043	+6.9%
1992	1,524	−25.4%
2002	1,511	−0.9%
2011	1,581	+4.6%
2021	1,610	+1.8%
Source: Census data

At the 2021 census, the commune had a population of 1,610; of those, 88.7% were Romanians and 5.34% Roma.

== Natives ==
- Laurențiu Streza (born 1947), cleric, a metropolitan bishop in the Romanian Orthodox Church.
