= Ilie Crețulescu =

Romanian general

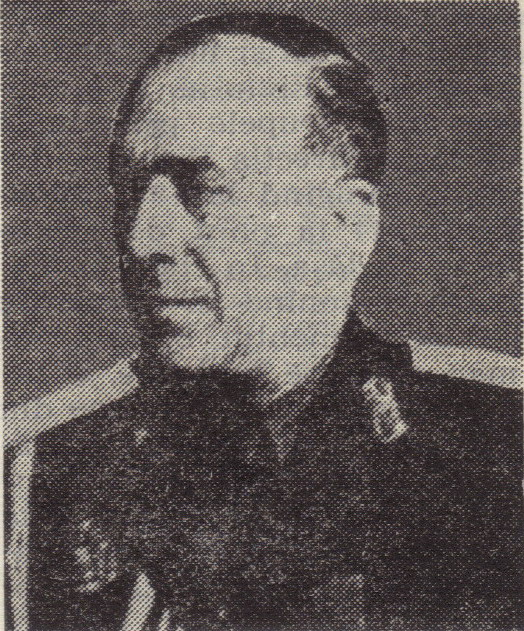
- Born: October 2, 1892; Ploiești, Kingdom of Romania
- Died: November 30, 1971 (aged 79); Bucharest, Socialist Republic of Romania
- Burial place: Bellu Cemetery, Bucharest, Romania; 44.40622°N 26.09706°E
- Education: Military School for Infantry Officers; Higher War School
- Spouse(s): Adina Străjescu, née Anastasiu (m. 1941)
- Military career
- Allegiance: Kingdom of Romania; Romanian People's Republic
- Branch: Army
- Service years: 1913–1948
- Rank: Colonel general
- Commands: 4th Army Corps; 9th Infantry Brigade; 104th, 103rd, and 4th Mountain Divisions
- Awards: Order of the Crown (Romania); Order of the Star of Romania; Order of Michael the Brave; Order of the White Eagle (Serbia); Military Order of the White Lion; Order of 23 August
- Other work: Prefect of Neamț County (1939); Under-Secretary of State for Land Forces (4 November–6 December 1944); Vice Chief of the General Staff (6 December 1944–15 August 1945)

Ilie Crețulescu (2 October 1892 – 30 November 1971) was a Romanian major-general during World War II.

== Biography ==
=== Early days ===
He was born in Ploiești in 1892 (other sources place his birthplace in Piatra Neamț). After attending elementary school in his native city, his family moved to Piatra Neamț, where he graduated from the Petru Rareș High School in 1911. He then went to Bucharest, where he graduated from the Military School for Infantry Officers in June 1913 with the rank of second lieutenant. He was named platoon commander in the 15th Infantry Regiment Războieni, garrisoned in Piatra Neamț.

=== World War I ===
After Romania entered World War I on the side of the Allies, Crețulescu served in the Romanian Army from August 1916 to July 1918, and again from October 1918 to March 1921. He was promoted to lieutenant in July 1916 and captain in July 1917. For valor on the battlefield, he was awarded the Order of the Star of Romania, Knight class and the Order of the Crown, Officer class.

=== The interwar ===
In the fall of 1923 he enrolled in the Higher War School, graduating in 1925. He then worked for six years at the General Staff, being promoted to major in 1929. From 1931 to 1937 he served as military attaché to the Kingdom of Yugoslavia in Belgrade, and advanced in rank to lieutenant colonel in 1933 and to colonel in 1938. From April 1938 to February 1939, he was Commanding Officer of the 15th Infantry Regiment in Piatra Neamț. In 1939, he served as prefect of Neamț County. In June 1940, he was awarded the Order of the Star of Romania, Officer class.

=== World War II ===
In September 1940, Crețulescu was appointed Chief of Staff of the 4th Army Corps, with headquarters in Iași, while in June 1941 he was named Commanding Officer of the 9th Infantry Brigade Mărășești, based in Constanța, which he led until April 1944. He advanced in rank to brigadier general in March 1943. From April to November 1944, he held a series of positions: General Officer Commanding 104th Mountain Command, General Officer Commanding 103rd Mountain Division, and General Officer Commanding 4th Mountain Division (Vânători de munte). In the wake of the 23 August coup d'état, Romania switched sides to the Allies. In September 1944, during the Battle of Turda, he fought with the 103rd Mountain Division against Axis forces in Transylvania, in the Ciuc Mountains and on to the Mureș River.

Subsequently, Crețulescu served as Under-Secretary of State for Land Forces (November–December 1944), and then Vice Chief of the General Staff (December 1944–August 1945). During that time, he coordinated the operations of the Romanian 1st and 4th Armies in Czechoslovakia and Austria. For his wartime activities, he was awarded the Order of Michael the Brave, 3rd class, the Order of the White Eagle (Serbia), and the Military Order of the White Lion.

=== After the war ===
From August 1945 to June 1947, he was General Officer Commanding Frontier Troops. On 23 August 1946 he was promoted to major general. In 1947, Crețulescu served as Deputy General Officer Commanding the 1st Military Region and then Chief of Staff of the 1st Military Region. He retired in 1948, and was promoted to colonel general (retired) in 1960. In 1964 he was awarded the Order of 23 August, 2nd class, and in 1968 he published his memoirs.

=== Personal life ===
In 1941 he married Adina Străjescu, the daughter of General Ioan Anastasiu and the widow of Colonel Paul Străjescu. Crețulescu died in Bucharest in 1971, and was buried in the city's Bellu Cemetery. The funeral monument of the family features statues of Saints Peter and Paul by Ion Jalea.
