= Sâmbăta de Sus Monastery =

Monastery in Sâmbăta de Sus, Brașov County, Romania

- Mănăstirea Sâmbăta de Sus
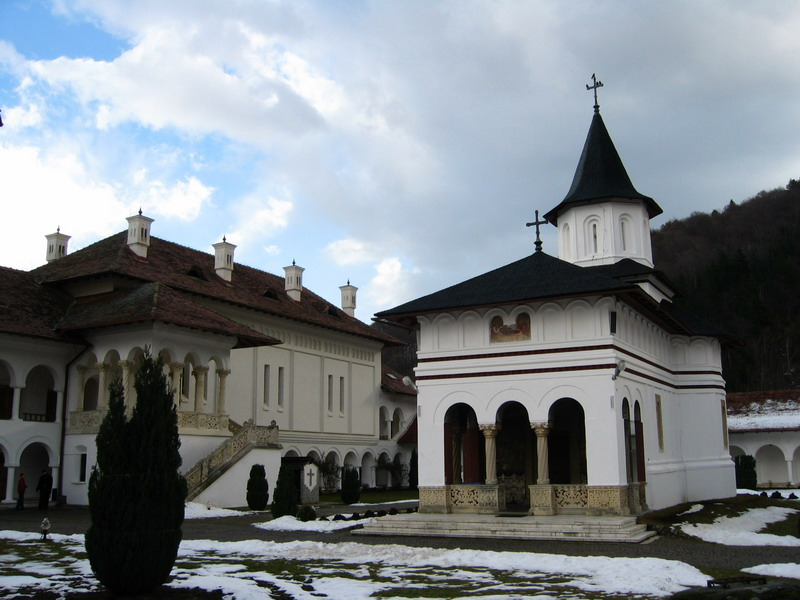
- Interactive map of Sâmbăta de Sus Monastery

Monastery information
- Denomination: Romanian Orthodox
- Established: 1701
- Dedication: Dormition of the Mother of God
- Consecrated: 1946
- Diocese: Sibiu

People
- Founder: Constantin Brâncoveanu

Architecture
- Heritage designation: Historic Monument

Site
- Location: Sâmbăta de Sus
- Country: Romania
- Coordinates: 45.6901°N 24.7947°E
- Website: www.manastireabrancoveanu.ro

Sâmbăta de Sus Monastery (Romanian: Mănăstirea Sâmbăta de Sus) is a Romanian Orthodox monastery in Sâmbăta de Sus, in the Brașov County of Transylvania, Romania. Dedicated to the Dormition of the Mother of God, it is also known as the Brâncoveanu Monastery (Mănăstirea Brâncoveanu).

== History ==
There is evidence of skete monasticism being practiced in the area by the early 17th century. Sâmbăta de Sus village and surrounding land entered into the Brâncoveanu family's possession in 1654. Constantin Brâncoveanu, Prince of Wallachia, built a stone and brick church in place of an older wooden one around 1696, with the monastery established by 1701. Part of his motivation was to strengthen the Orthodox presence in the region and guard against encroaching Catholicism, which had become a more pressing issue after 1683 and the consolidation of Habsburg domination over Transylvania. Concurrent with the monastery's establishment, the Romanian Greek-Catholic Church was founded, drawing numerous Transylvanian Orthodox under Papal authority. Brâncoveanu also established a school for secretaries, a workshop for fresco paintings and a small printing press at the monastery site.

Over the course of the 18th century, there was pressure on the monks to accept union with Rome. In 1761, Adolf von Buccow, Governor of Transylvania, ordered the destruction of all Orthodox monasteries under his jurisdiction. Sâmbăta de Sus was spared, probably following an intervention by the Brâncoveanu family. Its prestige grew, as it remained the only Orthodox monastery in Țara Făgărașului. The gilt interior frescoes were painted in 1766. From 1772 to 1802, the Brâncoveanus lost control over the property due to failure to pay a debt, rendering its destruction easier. Greek-Catholic Bishop Grigore Maior insisted it be suppressed, as its monks not only refused to convert, but also urged local inhabitants not to do so. In 1782, an order from the imperial court in Vienna decreed that all monasteries whose inhabitants led lives only of contemplation should be disbanded. Despite pleas from the Brâncoveanus, the monastery was destroyed in November 1785. The church was severely damaged although not demolished, and the monks most likely crossed the Carpathians into Wallachia.

In 1922, following the union of Transylvania with Romania and subsequent land reform, the Romanian government transferred the property from the Brâncoveanu family to the Sibiu Archdiocese. Nicolae Bălan, then Sibiu's archbishop as well as Metropolitan of Transylvania, decided to restore the monastery. Work began in 1926, with the rebuilt church and other structures consecrated in 1946. A number of further restorations followed, with a major one concluding in 1993. The monastery is classified as a historic monument by Romania's Ministry of Culture and Religious Affairs. In addition, three individual properties are listed as such: the church, the annexes and the park.

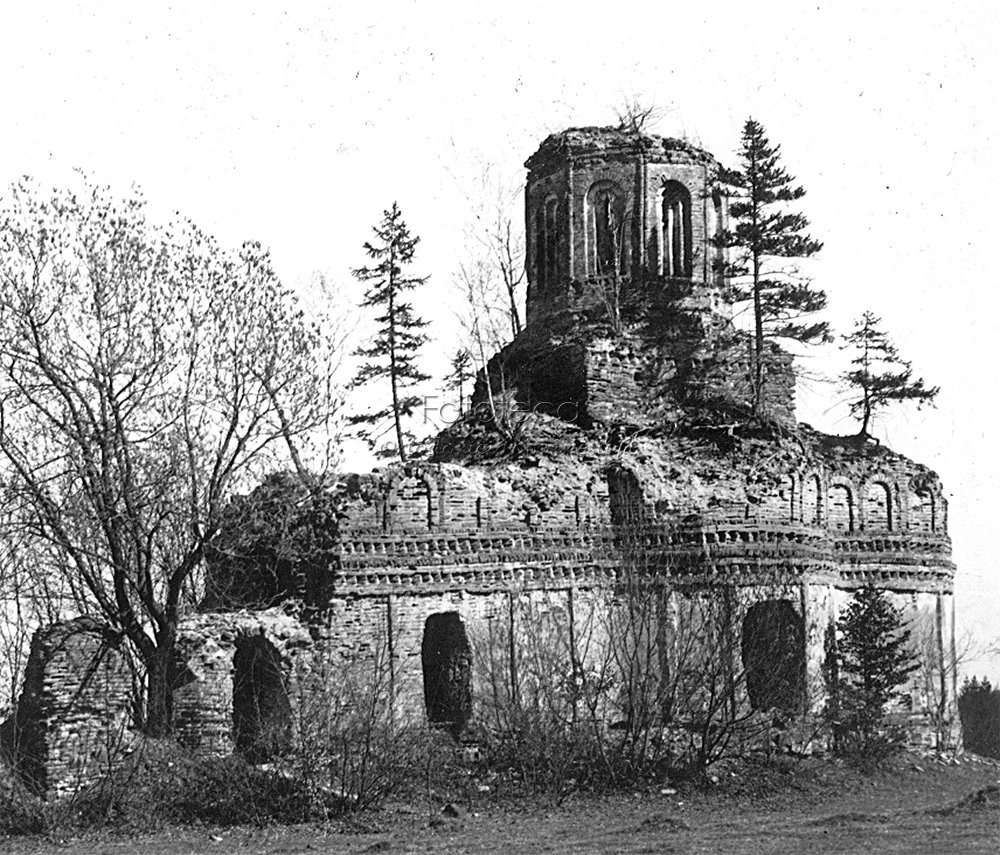
The church in ruins (late 19th century)

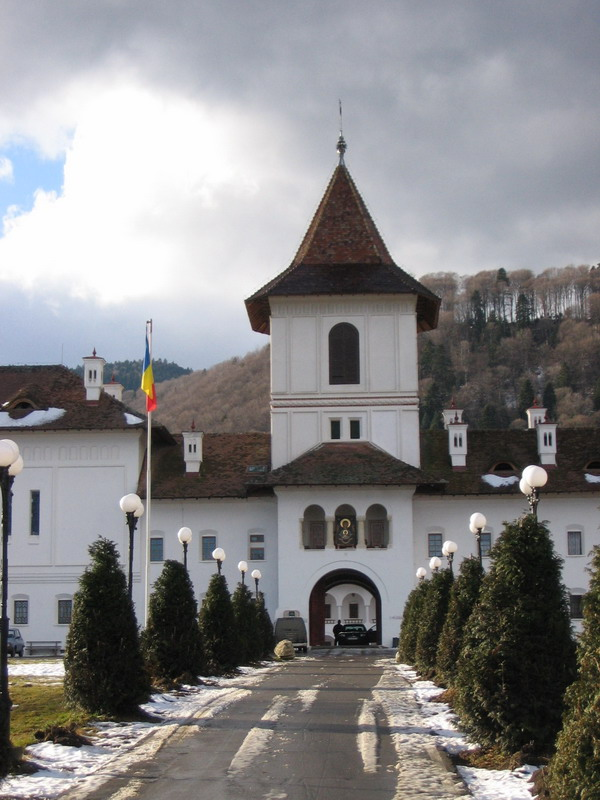
Entrance

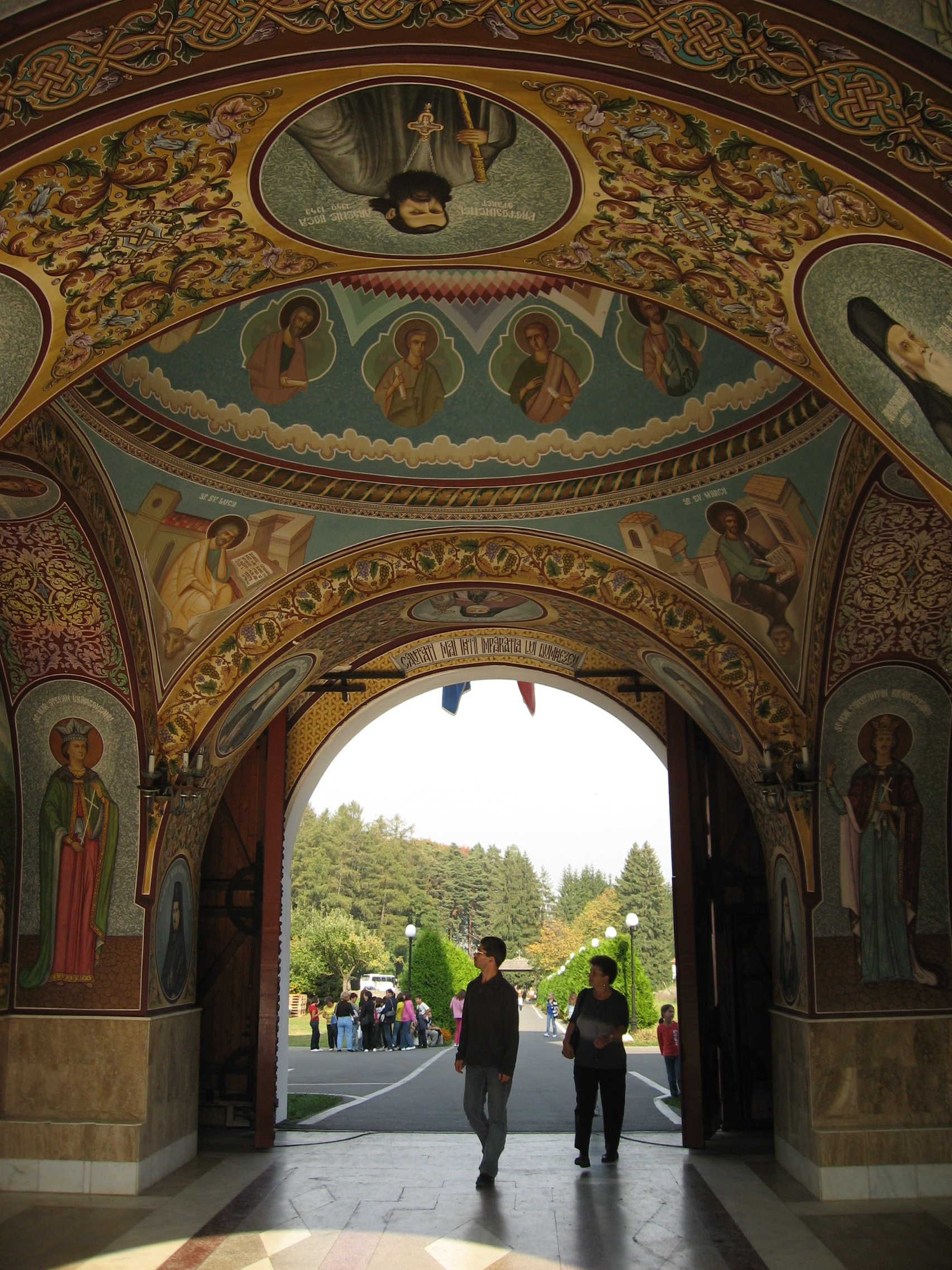
Beneath the gate

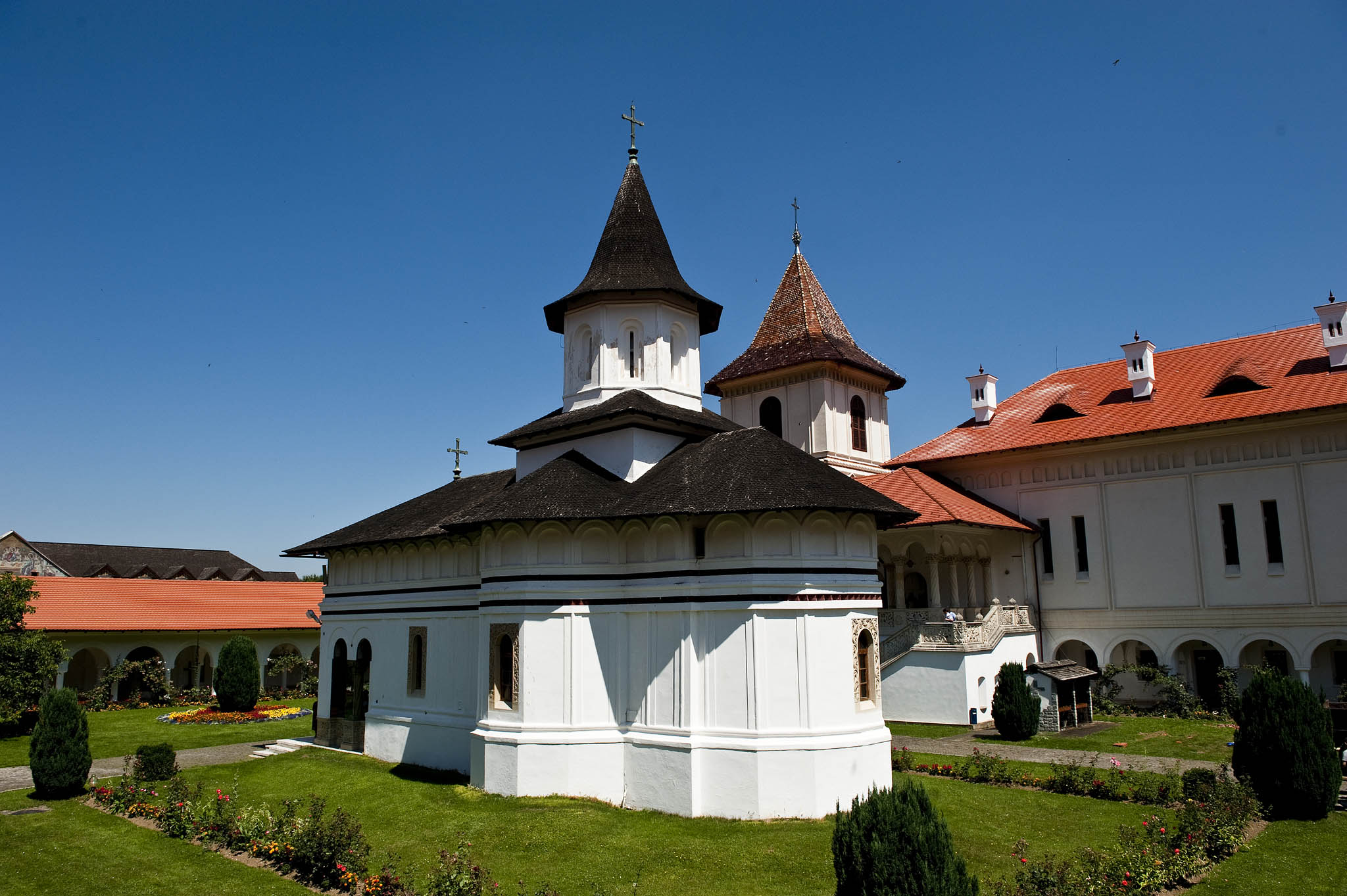
Church exterior

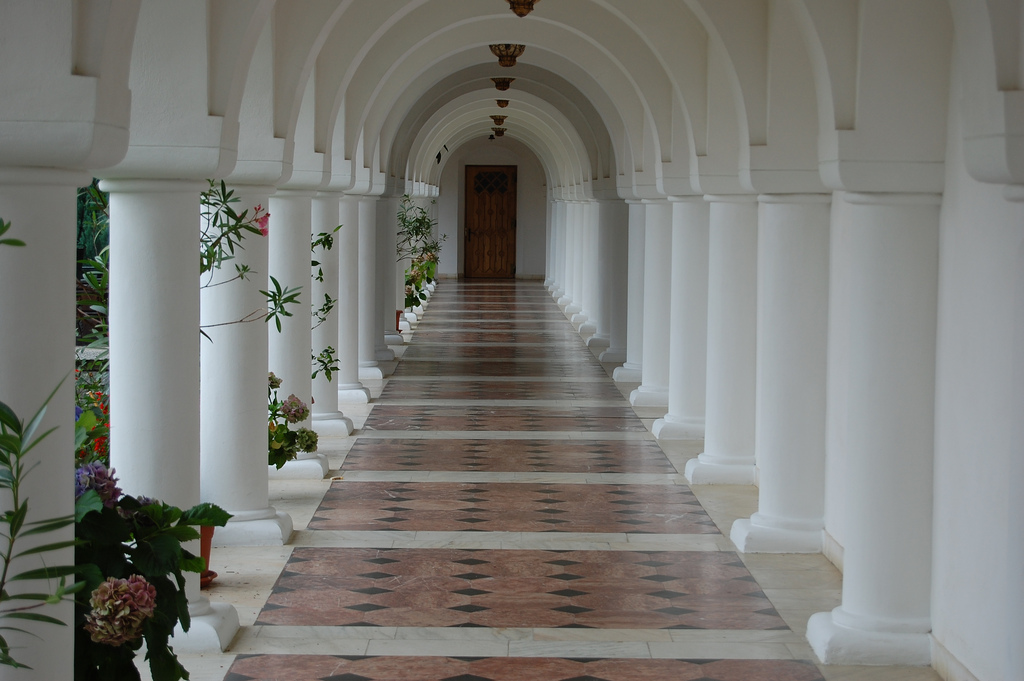
Arcade

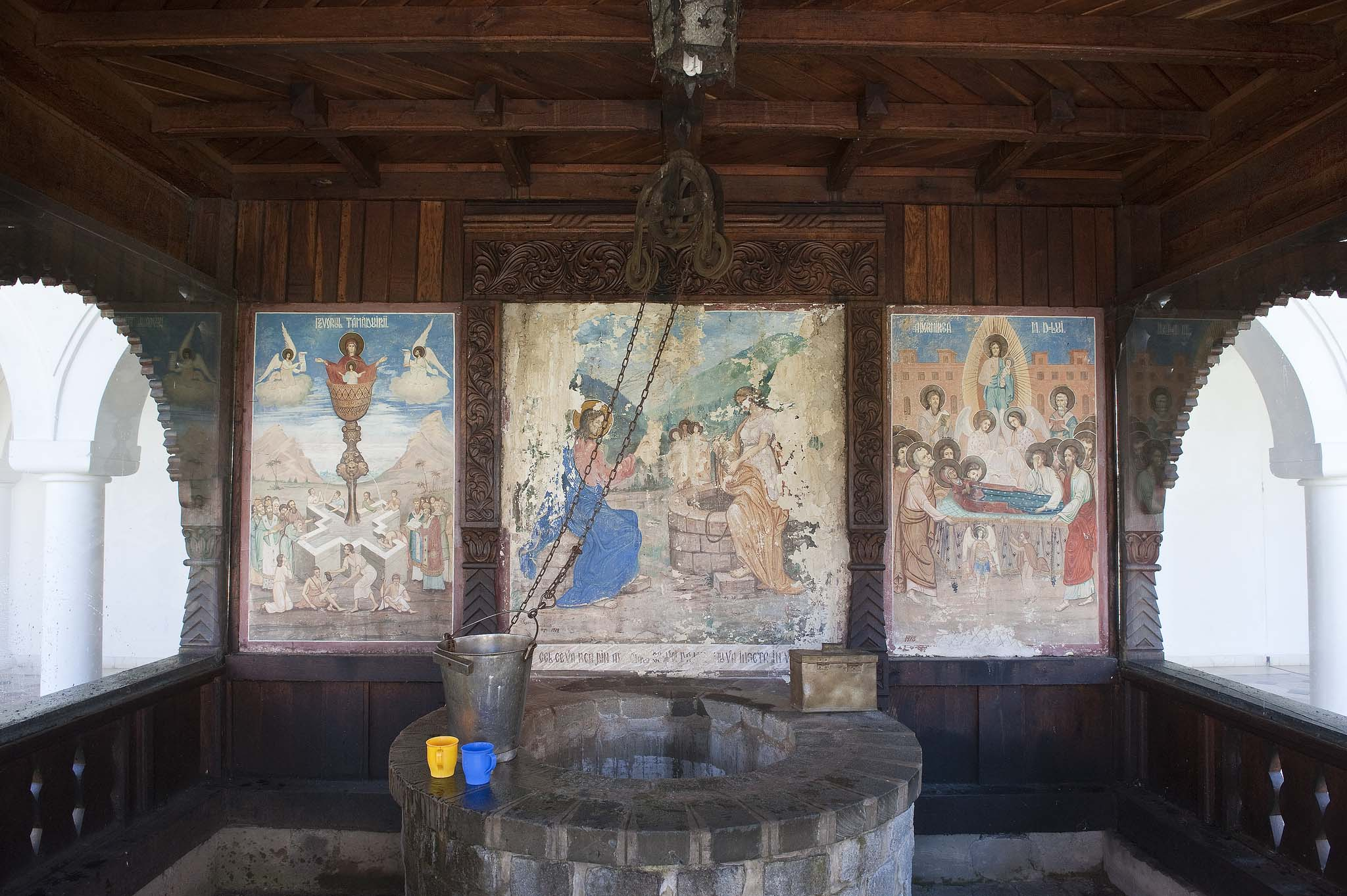
Spring of life fountain

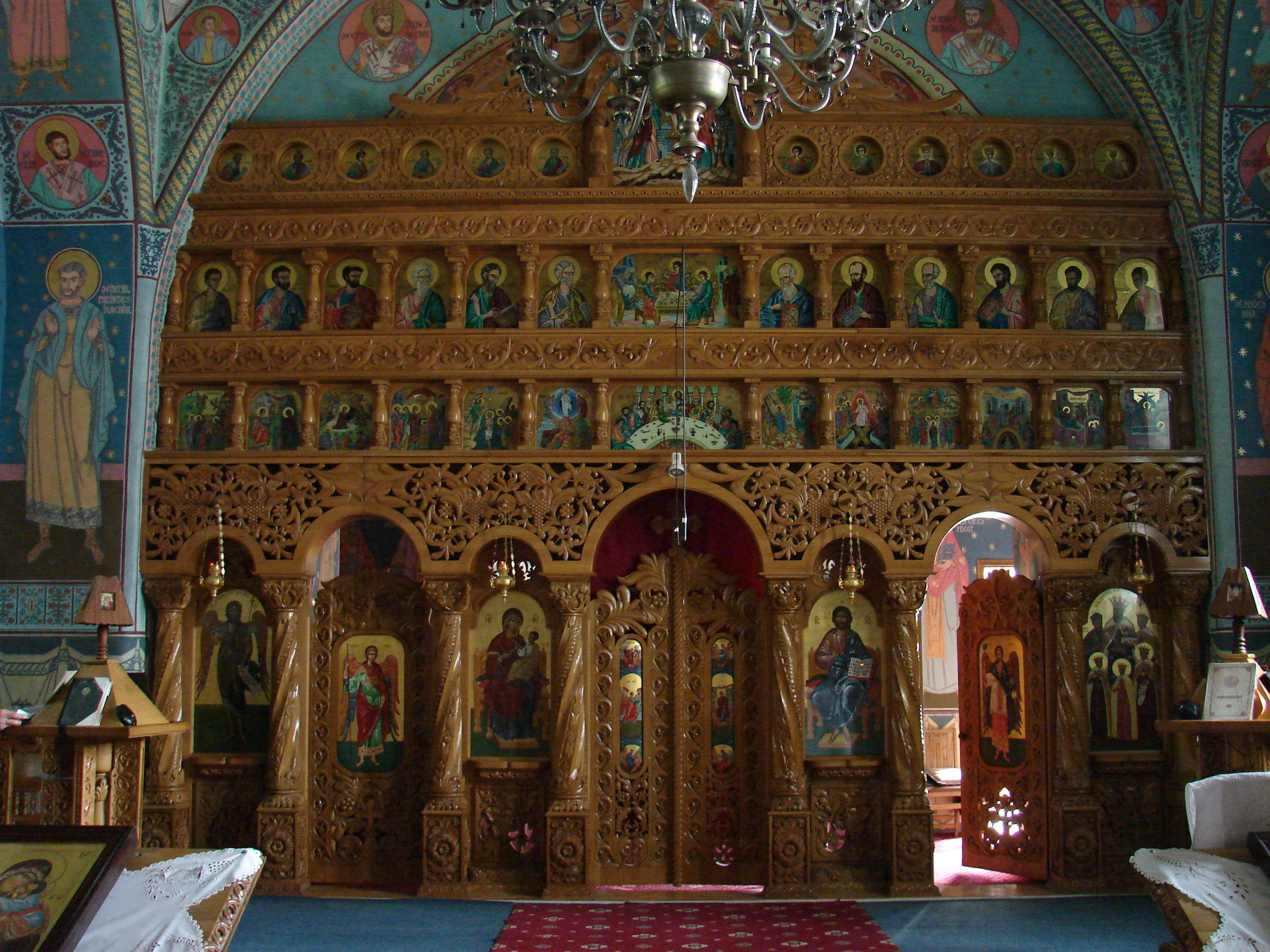
Iconostasis

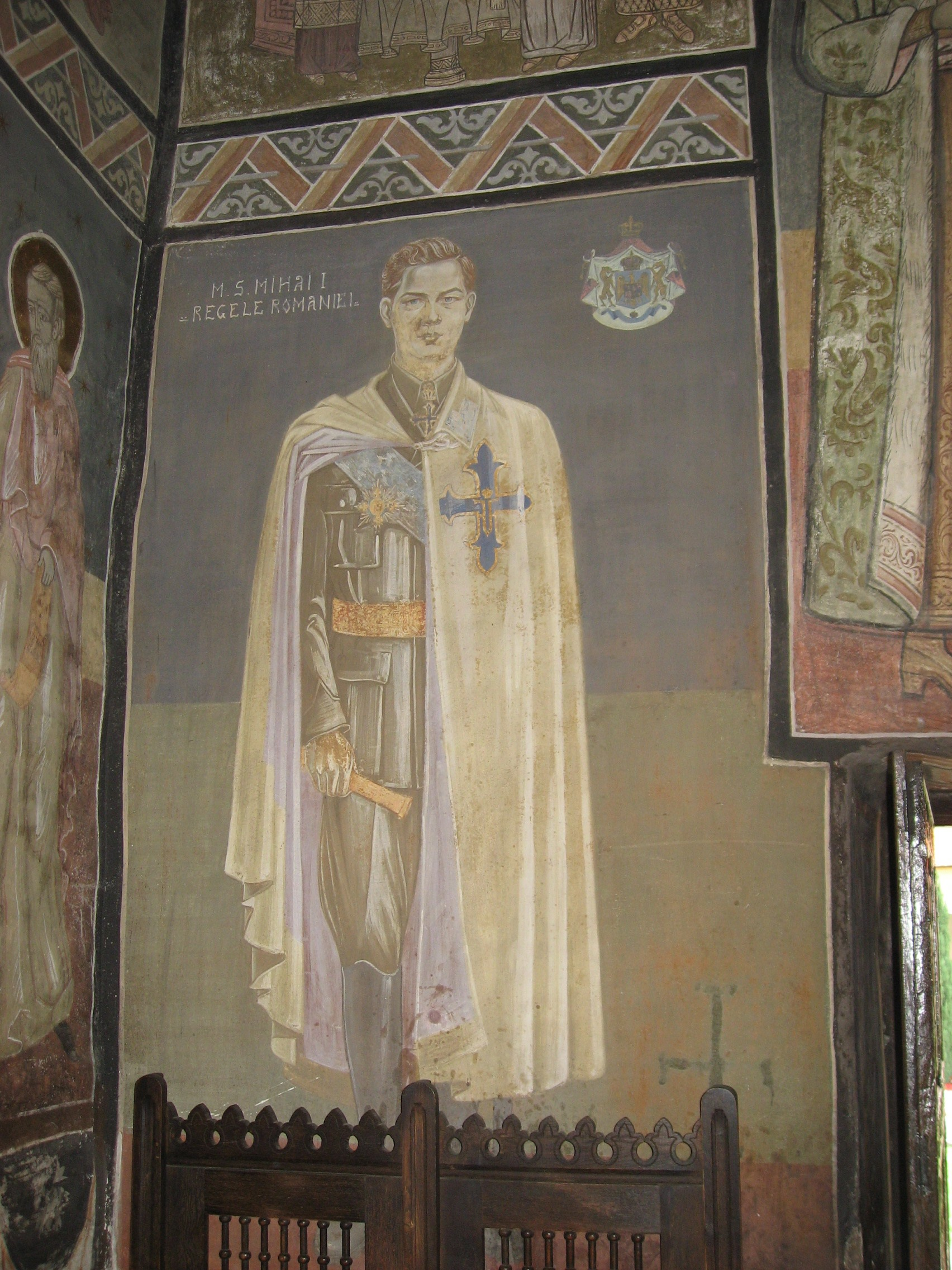
Portrait of King Michael, who was on the throne when the monastery reopened
