= List of foreign recipients of the Knight's Cross of the Iron Cross =

In total, 43 individuals in the military of allies of Nazi Germany, excluding non German units, were awarded the Knight's Cross of the Iron Cross (German: Ritterkreuz des Eisernen Kreuzes), the highest award in the military of Nazi Germany during World War II. Eight of these men were also honoured with the next higher grade, the Oak Leaves to the Knight's Cross, and one senior naval officer, Fleet Admiral Isoroku Yamamoto, was additionally awarded the Swords to the Knight's Cross with Oak Leaves. Among the recipients were eighteen Romanians, nine Italians, eight Hungarians, two Slovaks, two Japanese, two Spaniards, two Finns, one Dutch man, and one Belgian. (Note: Léon Degrelle from Belgium had received the Knight's Cross of the Iron Cross while subordinated to the Wehrmacht. Degrelle had received the Knight's Cross as SS-Hauptsturmführer der Reserve and leader of the 5. SS-Freiwilligen-Brigade "Wallonien" on 20 February 1944.)

Colonel General Dezső László of Hungary became the last foreign recipient of the award on 3 March 1945. The last surviving foreign recipient of the award was Belgian politician Léon Degrelle, who died on 31 March 1994, fifty years after receiving the medal from Hitler's hands.

== Background ==
The Oberkommando der Wehrmacht kept separate Knight's Cross lists, one for each of the military branches, Heer (Army), Kriegsmarine (Navy), Luftwaffe (Air force) and for the Waffen-SS. Within each of these lists a unique sequential number was assigned to each recipient. The same numbering paradigm was applied to the higher grades of the Knight's Cross, one list per grade. Once the four lists of the Knight's Cross recipients were merged into one listing, the chronological order was abandoned and the list was converted to an alphabetical list of recipients. Foreign recipients were never integrated into this list. The Wehrmacht also refrained from assigning a numbering scheme to the different lists of foreign recipients. Two principles were retained: the foreign Knights Cross recipients were ordered alphabetically and the recipients of the higher grades were ordered chronologically.

The Knight's Cross of the Iron Cross and its higher grades were based on four separate enactments. The first enactment Reichsgesetzblatt I S. 1573 of 1 September 1939 instituted the Iron Cross (Eisernes Kreuz) and the Knight's Cross of the Iron Cross. As the war progressed, some of the recipients distinguished themselves further and a higher grade, the Oak Leaves to Knight's Cross of the Iron Cross, was instituted. The Oak Leaves, as they were commonly referred to, were based on the enactment Reichsgesetzblatt I S. 849 of 3 June 1940. In 1941, two higher grades of the Knight's Cross were instituted. The enactment Reichsgesetzblatt I S. 613 of 28 September 1941 introduced the Knight's Cross of the Iron Cross with Oak Leaves and Swords and the Knight's Cross of the Iron Cross with Oak Leaves, Swords and Diamonds. At the end of 1944 the final grade, the Knight's Cross of the Iron Cross with Golden Oak Leaves, Swords, and Diamonds (Ritterkreuz des Eisernen Kreuzes mit goldenem Eichenlaub, Schwertern und Brillanten), based on the enactment Reichsgesetzblatt 1945 I S. 11 of 29 December 1944, concluded the variants of the Knight's Cross.

== Recipients ==
The recipients of the Knight's Cross of the Iron Cross are initially ordered alphabetically whereas the recipients of the higher grades are initially ordered chronologically. The rank listed is the recipient's rank at the time the Knight's Cross or the Oak Leaves were awarded.

This along with the * (asterisk), indicates that the Knight's Cross was awarded posthumously.

=== Recipients of the Knight's Cross of the Iron Cross with Oak Leaves and Swords ===
The Knight's Cross with Oak Leaves and Swords is based on the enactment Reichsgesetzblatt I S. 613 of 28 September 1941 to reward those servicemen who had already been awarded the Oak Leaves to the Knight's Cross of the Iron Cross. Isoroku Yamamoto was the sole non-German combatant to be honoured with the Swords to the Knight's Cross with Oak Leaves.

| Name | Country | Rank | Role and unit | Date of award | Notes | Picture |
|---|---|---|---|---|---|---|
| Isoroku Yamamoto | Japan | Admiral | Commander-in-chief of the IJN Combined Fleet | 27 May 1943* | Killed in action 18 April 1943 | |

=== Recipients of the Knight's Cross of the Iron Cross with Oak Leaves ===
The Knight's Cross with Oak Leaves was based on the enactment Reichsgesetzblatt I S. 849 of 3 June 1940.

| Name | Country | Rank | Role and unit | Date of award | Notes | Picture |
|---|---|---|---|---|---|---|
| Mihail Lascăr | Romania | Major General (General de divizie) | Commander of the Romanian 6th Infantry Division of the 3rd Romanian Army | 22 November 1942 | — | |
| Agustín Muñoz Grandes | Spain | Lieutenant General | Commander of the Spanish Blue Division (250. Infantry Division) | 13 December 1942 | — | |
| Isoroku Yamamoto | Japan | Admiral | Commander-in-chief of the IJN Combined Fleet | 27 May 1943* | Awarded Swords 27 May 1943 | |
| Corneliu Teodorini | Romania | Brigadier General (General de brigadă) | Commander of the Romanian 6th Cavalry Division | 8 December 1943 | — | |
| Petre Dumitrescu | Romania | Lieutenant General (General de armată) | Commander-in-chief of the Romanian 3rd Romanian Army | 4 April 1944 | — | |
| Mineichi Koga | Japan | Admiral | Japanese Chief of Fleet | 12 May 1944* | Killed in action 31 March 1944 | |
| Carl Gustaf Emil Mannerheim | Finland | Marshal of Finland | President and Commander-in-chief of Finnish Defense Forces | 5 August 1944 | — | |
| Léon Degrelle | Belgium | SS-Sturmbannführer | Commander of 5th SS Volunteer Sturmbrigade Wallonien | 27 August 1944 | — | |

=== Recipients of the Knight's Cross of the Iron Cross ===
The Knight's Cross of the Iron Cross is based on the enactment Reichsgesetzblatt I S. 1573 of 1 September 1939 Verordnung über die Erneuerung des Eisernen Kreuzes (Regulation of the renewing of the Iron Cross).

| Name | Country | Rank | Role and unit | Date of award | Notes | Picture |
|---|---|---|---|---|---|---|
| Ion Antonescu | Romania | General (General de armată) | Commander-in-chief of the Military of Romania | 6 August 1941 | First non-German to receive this award | |
| Ugo de Carolis | Italy | Brigadier General (Generale di Brigata) | Commander of the Italian 52nd Infantry Division "Torino" | 9 February 1942* | Killed in action 12 December 1941 | |
| Ugo Cavallero | Italy | General (Generale di Corpo d'Armata designato d'Armata) | Chief of the Italian Supreme Command | 14 February 1942 | — | |
| Corneliu Dragalina | Romania | Lieutenant General (General de divizie) | Commanding general of the Romanian 6th Army Corps | 6 August 1942 (Note: According to Von Seemen on 9 August 1942.) | — | |
| Ioan Dumitrache | Romania | Major General (General de brigadă) | Commander of the Romanian 2nd Romanian Mountain Division | 21 November 1942 | — | |
| Petre Dumitrescu | Romania | General (General de armată) | Commander-in-chief of the 3rd Romanian Army | 1 September 1942 | Awarded Oak Leaves 4 April 1944 | |
| Emilio Esteban Infantes | Spain | Lieutenant General | Commander of the Spanish Blue Division (250. Infantry Division) | 3 October 1943 | — | |
| Carlo Fecia di Cossato | Italy | Frigate Captain (Capitano di Fregata) | Commander of the Italian submarine Enrico Tazzoli | 19 March 1943 | — | |
| Italo Gariboldi | Italy | General (Generale di Corpo d'Armata designato d'Armata) | Commander-in-chief of the 8th Italian Army | 1 April 1943 | — | |
| Gianfranco Gazzana-Priaroggia | Italy | Corvette Captain (Capitano di Corvetta) | Commander of the Italian submarine Archimede | 26 May 1943* | Killed in action 24 May 1943 | |
| Ermil Gheorghiu | Romania | Major General (General de escadră) | Chief of General Staff of the Romanian Air Force | 4 April 1944 | — | |
| Fedele De Giorgis | Italy | Major General (Generale di Divisione) | Commander of the Italian 55 Infantry Division Savona | 9 January 1942 | — | |
| Enzo Grossi | Italy | Frigate Captain (Capitano di Fregata) | Commander of the Italian submarine Barbarigo | 7 October 1942 | — | |
| Erik Heinrichs | Finland | General of the Infantry | Chief of Finnish General Staff | 5 August 1944 | — | |
| József Heszlényi | Hungary | Lieutenant field marshal (Altábornagy) | Leader of the 3rd Hungarian Army | 28 October 1944 | — | — |
| Nikolaus von Horthy und von Nagybánya | Hungary | Admiral (Tengernagy) | Commander-in-chief of the Military of Hungary | 10 September 1941 | — | |
| Ioan L. Hristea | Romania | Colonel | Commander of the Romanian 2nd Călărași Cavalry Regiment | 28 March 1943 | — | — |
| Mihály von Ibrányi | Hungary | Lieutenant field marshal (Altábornagy) | Commander of the Hungarian 1st Cavalry Division | 26 November 1944 | — | |
| Gusztáv Jány | Hungary | Lieutenant field marshal (Altábornagy) | Commander-in-chief of the 2nd Hungarian Army | 31 March 1943 | — | |
| Emanoil Ionescu | Romania | Major General (General de escadră) | Commanding general of the Romanian Air Force's Corpul I Aerian | 10 May 1944 (Note: According to Scherzer on 28 April 1944.) | — | |
| Mineichi Koga | Japan | Admiral | Japanese Chief of Fleet | 12 May 1944* | Oak Leaves 12 May 1944 | |
| Radu Korne | Romania | Colonel | Commander of the Romanian 8th Cavalry Division | 18 December 1942 | — | |
| Geza Lakatos Edler de Csíkszentsimon | Hungary | Colonel General (Vezérezredes) | Commander-in-chief of the 1st Hungarian Army | 24 May 1944 | — | |
| Mihail Lascar | Romania | Major General (General de brigadă) | Commander of the Romanian 1st Mountain Brigade | 18 January 1942 | Awarded Oak Leaves 22 November 1942 | |
| Dezső László | Hungary | Colonel General (Vezérezredes) | Commander-in-chief of the 1st Hungarian Army | 3 March 1945 | — | |
| Horia Macellariu | Romania | Rear Admiral (Contraadmiral) | Commander-in-chief of the Romanian Naval Forces | 21 May 1944 | — | |
| Augustín Malár | Slovakia | Major General | Commander of the Slovak Fast Division | 23 January 1942 | — | |
| Baron Carl Gustaf Emil Mannerheim | Finland | Field Marshal | Commander-in-chief of the Finnish Defense Forces | 30 August 1941 | Awarded Oak Leaves 5 August 1944 | |
| Gheorghe Manoliu | Romania | Lieutenant General (General de divizie) | Commander of the Romanian 4th Mountain Division | 30 August 1942 | — | — |
| Giulio Martinat | Italy | Brigadier General (Generale di Brigata) | Chief of Staff of the Italian Alpini Corps (Corpo d'Armata Alpino) | 3 April 1943* | Killed in action 26 January 1943 | |
| Giovanni Messe | Italy | Lieutenant General (Generale di Corpo d'Armata) | Commanding general of the Italian Expeditionary Corps in Russia | 23 January 1942 | — | |
| Béla Miklós de Dálnok | Hungary | Lieutenant field marshal (Altábornagy) | Commanding general of the Hungarian Fast Corps | 4 December 1941 | — | |
| Leonard Mociulschi | Romania | Major General (General de brigadă) | Commander of the Romanian 3rd Mountain Division | 19 December 1943 | — | |
| Agustín Muñoz Grandes | Spain | Lieutenant General | Commander of the Spanish Blue Division (250. Infantry Division) | 12 March 1942 | Awarded Oak Leaves 13 December 1942 | |
| Ioan Pălăghiţă | Romania | Major | Commander of the Romanian I./Infantry Regiment 94 | 7 April 1943 | — | |
| Ioan Mihail Racoviţă | Romania | General of the Cavalry (General de corp de armată) | Commander-in-chief of the 4th Romanian Army | 8 July 1944 | — | |
| Edgar Rădulescu | Romania | Major General (General de brigadă) | Commander of the Romanian 11th Infantry Division | 3 July 1944 | — | — |
| Gheorghe Răscănescu | Romania | Major | Commander of the Romanian I./Infantry Regiment 15 | 4 December 1942 | — | |
| Zoltán Szügyi | Hungary | Colonel (Ezredes) | Commander of the Hungarian Infantry Division Szent László | 12 January 1945 | — | |
| Nicolae Tătăranu | Romania | Major General (General de divizie) | Commander of the Romanian 20th Infantry Division | 17 December 1942 | — | — |
| Corneliu Teodorini | Romania | Colonel | Commander of the Romanian 6th Cavalry Division | 27 August 1943 | Awarded Oak Leaves 8 December 1943 | |
| Jozef Turanec | Slovakia | Major General | Commander of the Slovak Fast Division | 7 August 1942 | — | — |
| Isoroku Yamamoto | Japan | Admiral | Commander-in-chief of the IJN Combined Fleet | 27 May 1943* | Awarded Oak Leaves 27 May 1943; Awarded Swords 27 May 1943 | |
