= Ioan Dumitrache =

Romanian general

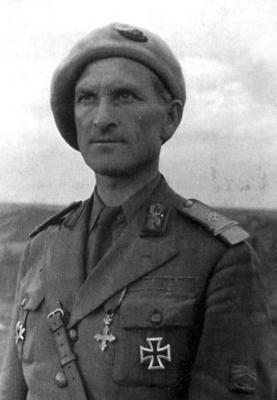
- Born: 25 August 1889; Ciorăști, Râmnicu Sărat County, Kingdom of Romania
- Died: 6 March 1977 (aged 87); Brașov, Socialist Republic of Romania
- Burial place: Groaveri Cemetery, Șcheii Brașovului, Brașov, Romania
- Education: Carol I National Defence University
- Military career
- Allegiance: Romania
- Branch: Romanian Army
- Service years: 1911–1947
- Rank: Lieutenant general
- Commands: 2nd Mountain Division
- Conflicts: Second Balkan War; World War I; World War II; Eastern Front; Operation München; Battle of the Sea of Azov; Battle of the Caucasus; Kuban bridgehead; Crimean offensive; Battle of Turda
- Awards: Order of the Crown; Order of Michael the Brave; Knight's Cross of the Iron Cross

Prefect of Năsăud County
- In office 11 February 1938 – 6 March 1939
- Prime Minister: Miron Cristea

Ioan Dumitrache (25 August 1889 – 6 March 1977) was a Romanian major general during World War II, in command of the 2nd Mountain Division. His troops (vânători de munte) were recognized as the elite troops of the Romanian Army throughout the campaign on the Eastern Front. He was a recipient of the Knight's Cross of the Iron Cross of Nazi Germany, awarded to him for capturing Nalchik on November 2, 1942.

== Biography ==
=== Early life ===
He was born in Ciorăști in 1889, in what was then Râmnicu Sărat County (now Vrancea County), in the Muntenia region of Romania, the son of Gheorghe and Ioana Dumitrache. He attended the gymnasium in Râmnicu Sărat and the Alexandru Ioan Cuza High School in Focșani. In 1909 he was admitted to the Military School of Infantry Officers in Bucharest, from which he graduated in 1911 with the rank of second lieutenant. In 1913 he participated in the Second Balkan War, and was promoted to lieutenant in 1914.

=== World War I and the interwar ===
After Romania entered World War I on the side of the Entente, Dumitrache took part in the Flămânda Offensive in 1916. He was wounded in the battles of 1916 and 1917, and advanced to the rank of captain in 1917. After the war, he was admitted to the Higher War School in 1919. Promoted to major in 1920, he graduated in 1921 and was assigned as staff officer with the 1st Vânători de munte Division in Arad. In 1924 he was reassigned to the 1st Mountain Division in Sinaia. In May 1929 he was promoted lieutenant colonel and named commanding officer of the 2nd Mountain Battalion in Caransebeș.

Reassigned after two years to the Inspectorate-General of Territorial Command in Bucharest, he was promoted to colonel in October 1935, and put in command of the 4th Mountain Group in Bistrița. Between February 1938 and March 1939 he also served as prefect of Năsăud County, being appointed to this position by Prime Minister Miron Cristea. In the fall of 1939 he was appointed commander of the 2nd Mixed Mountain Brigade, which covered the Tisa–Maramureș sector. After Northern Transylvania was ceded to Hungary in the wake of the Second Vienna Award, his unit withdrew to the Alba Iulia–Hațeg area, with the command post in Deva.

=== World War II ===
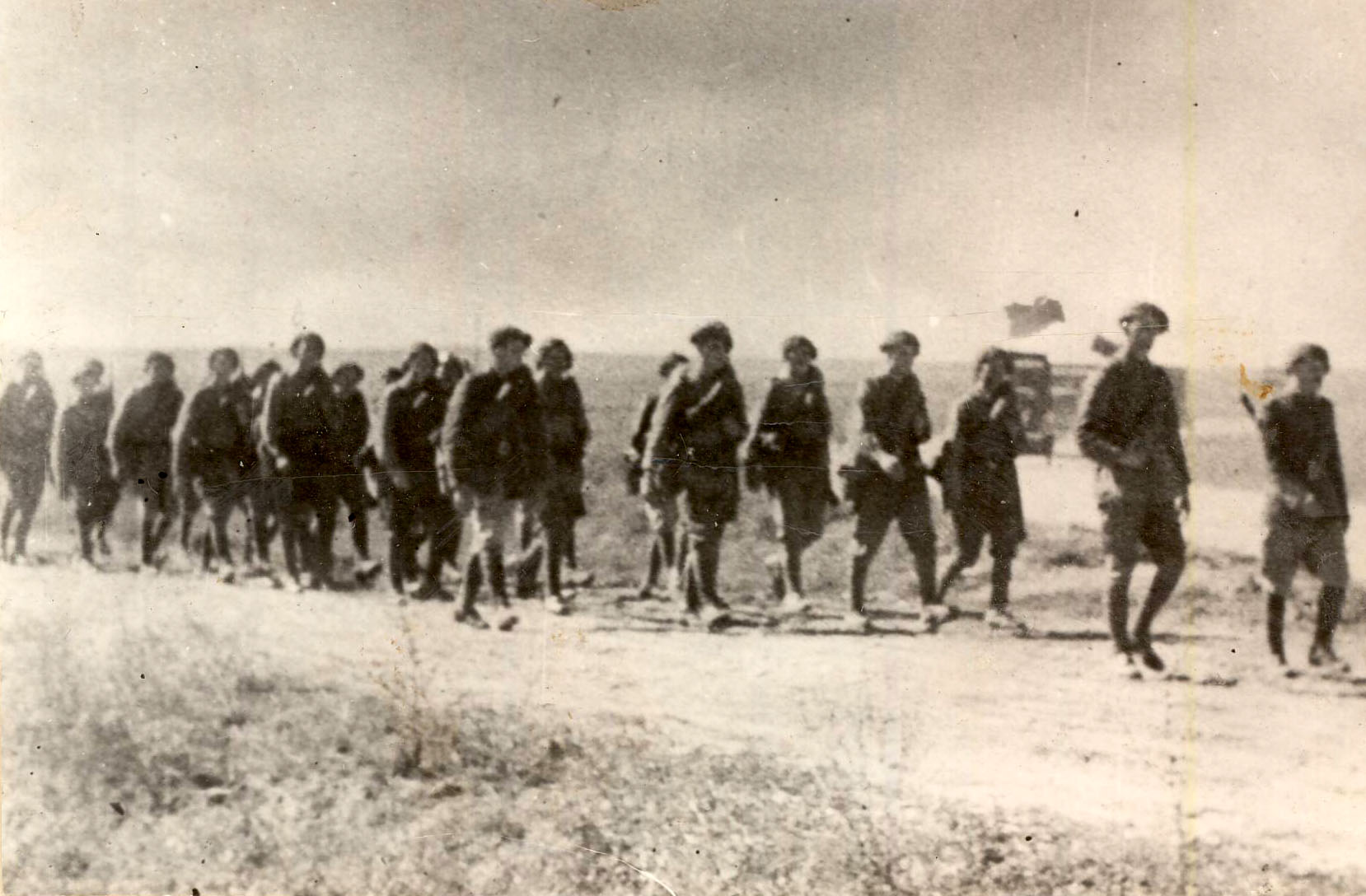
Vânători de munte on the Eastern Front in 1941

On 10 May 1941 he became brigadier general and was named commanding officer of the 2nd Mountain Brigade, subordinated to the Mountain Corps of the Romanian 3rd Army, under the command of General Petre Dumitrescu. From 20 June, the Mountain Corps, commanded by General Gheorghe Avramescu passed under the operational command of the Wehrmacht's 11th Army. Romania joined Operation Barbarossa on 22 June in order to reclaim the lost territories of Bessarabia and Northern Bukovina, which had been annexed by the Soviet Union in June 1940. The 3rd Army started the offensive in Northern Bukovina on 2 July as part of Operation München, attacking in the direction of Rădăuți–Cernăuți–Hotin. Dumitrache's 2nd Mountain Brigade was the spearhead of the attack on Cernăuți, which was taken on 4 July. Together with the 8th Cavalry Division, it forced the Prut River and liberated the Herța region; by 9 July, the entire northern part of Bukovina was under control of the Romanian Army. The 3rd Army carried out heavy fights for Hotin with the retreating forces of the Soviet 12th Army. Dumitrache was awarded in October 1941 the Order of Michael the Brave 3rd class for his actions in the reoccupation of Hotin.

Upon arriving at the Dniester River, the German 11th Army was subordinated to the Army Group South led by Marshal Gerd von Rundstedt. On 19 July, the 2nd Mountain Brigade crossed the Dniester and advanced towards the Bug River, fighting with the rear echelons of the Soviet 18th Army. On 10 August the mountain troops reached the Bug River, and then advanced towards the Dnieper River, securing the left flank of the Wehrmacht's XXX Army Corps. In mid-September, the 2nd Mountain Brigade crossed the Dnieper at Beryslav, and then was deployed in defense in Ulianovka and Mala Biloserka. The counteroffensive of the Soviet 9th and 18th Armies north of the Sea of Azov started on 23 September, but the 2nd Mountain Brigade offered stubborn resistance during the Battle of the Sea of Azov. At the beginning of October, the two Soviet Armies were surrounded by German and Romanian troops, resulting in a complete Axis victory over the Red Army. In November the Mountain Corps was rotated back to Romania; after almost five months of combat, Dumitrache's brigade had suffered 1,926 casualties.

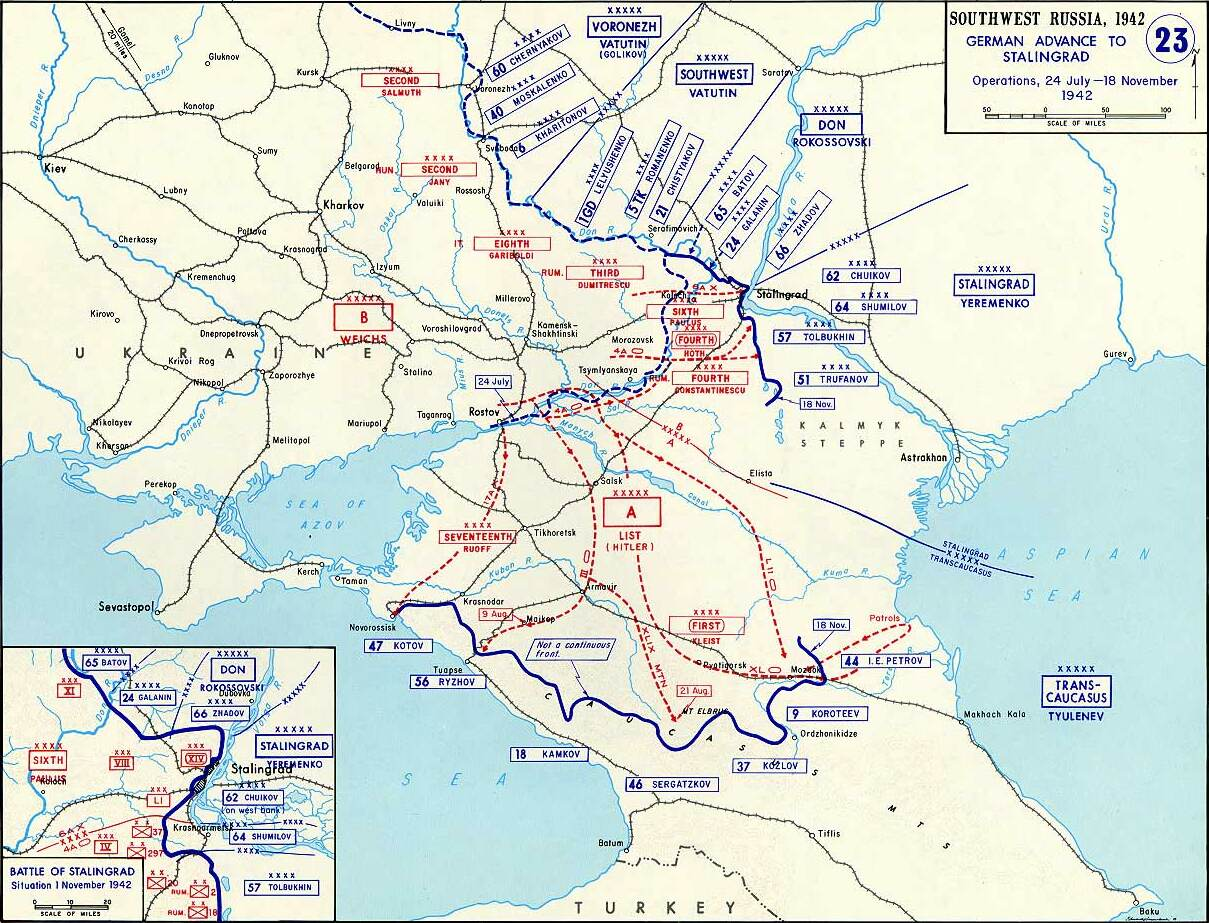
The front from July to November 1942

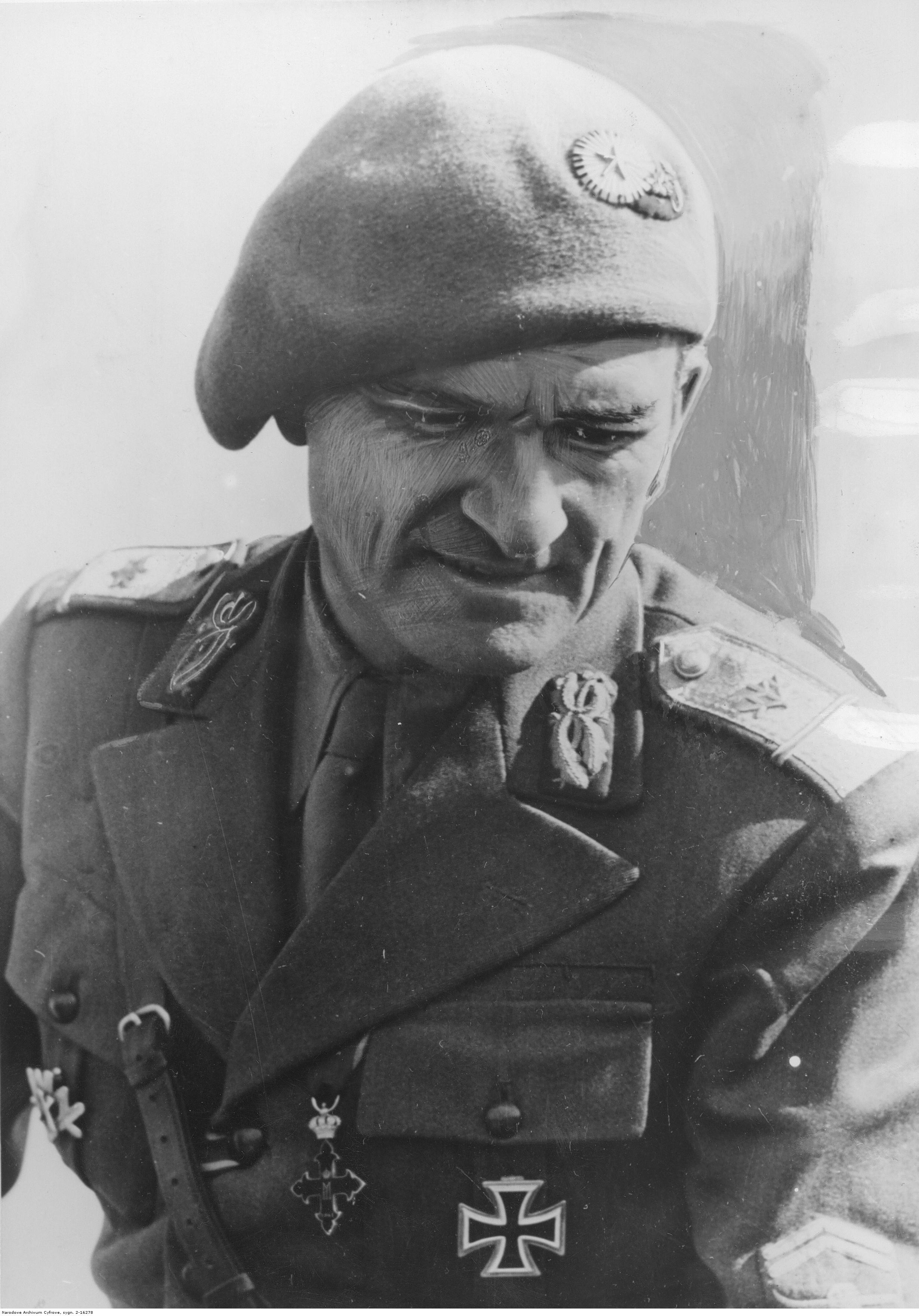
General Dumitrache in November 1942

The 2nd Mountain Brigade was upgraded to a Division on 15 March 1942, and Dumitrache became its commanding officer. The 2nd Mountain Division left for the front on 6 July, at the start of the Battle of the Caucasus. On 31 July it was in combat disposition with the 3rd Army in the Rostov area, from where it crossed the Don River and advanced southwards, subordinated to the 1st Panzer Army under the command of General Paul von Kleist. The first serious fighting occurred during the forcing of the Baksan River and the establishment of a bridgehead beyond it on Height 910. In mid-October, the mountain division started a strong offensive, occupying the village of Saiukovo, and taking 400 POWs. On 25 October Dumitrache's troops started the offensive towards Nalchik, in the foothills of the Caucasus Mountains, forcing the Baksan River once again. The front was broken between the Soviet 295th Rifle and 2nd Guards Rifle Divisions; on 28 October, after fierce fighting in the hills and forests near Nalchik, the 2nd Mountain Division taking its objective. The Battle of Nalchik ended as one of the biggest Romanian victories on the Eastern Front, with the capture of 3,079 prisoners and a large amount of weaponry and war materiel. In the battles of Baksan and Nalchik, the 2nd Mountain Division lost 820 soldiers (157 dead, 647 wounded and 16 missing). For this action, Dumitrache received 2 November 1942 the Knight's Cross of the Iron Cross, in the rank of Knight, the highest Order of the Third Reich.

The 2nd Mountain Division continued their offensive towards Alagir and Ordjonikidze, reaching on 15 November about 20 km (12 mi) from the Grozny oil center. Dumitrache's incursion constituted the farthest advance of the Axis powers in the Caucasus and the entire Eastern campaign. Later that month, the Red Army started its offensive in the Caucasus, surrounding the 13th Panzer Division near Mayramadag. Dumitrache's troops retook the Ordzonikidze–Alagir highway and allowed the German armored units to pull out. For its actions in the Battle of the Caucasus, the 2nd Mountain Division was nicknamed the "Flint Division". On 1 January 1943 Dumitrache was promoted to major general, and on 15 February he was awarded the Order of Michael the Brave, 2nd Class.

After the Soviet breakthroughs at the Battle of Stalingrad, the Axis forces in the Caucasus were put on the defensive, and began to withdraw. The 2nd Mountain Division arrived at the Taman Peninsula on 28 January 1943; subordinated to the German 52nd Corps from the 17th Army, it established defensive positions in the Kuban bridgehead, on the western bank of the Beysug River. After several more weeks of fighting, Dumitrache's mountain division was removed from the front line on 20 March, and was sent to the Alma Valley in Crimea for reorganization. Between July and October, the 2 Mountain Division carried out wear and tear battles with the Red Army and partisan detachments. On 10 November, after the 4th Ukrainian Front started its offensive on the North Crimean Canal, Dumitrache took over the command of a Romanian detachment, made up of troops from the 1st and 2nd Mountain, as well as 10th and 19th Infantry Divisions, that contained a Soviet bridgehead south of the Sivash Bay. After being relieved on 12 December by the German 336th Infantry Division, Dumitrache returned to the 2nd Mountain Division, and, together with a detachment led by Leonard Mociulschi, eliminated over 3,700 partisans in the Yaila Mountains. During the 4th Ukrainian Front's Crimean Offensive from April 1944, when the Soviet troops broke into Crimea, Dumitrache's division was divided in two: one part at Sevastopol, where it repulsed 24 Soviet attacks between 15 and 30 April 1944, while the other part was sacrificed by the German command in order to allow the retreat of the Axis troops from the Kerch Peninsula. During the last days of the battle for Sevastopol, the remnants of the 2nd Mountain Division were evacuated, and Dumitrache returned to Romania.

On 1 August 1944, Dumitrache was appointed to the command of the newly reorganized Mountain Corps that was deployed on the Romanian-Hungarian frontier in Southwestern Transylvania. The day after King Michael's Coup of 23 August 1944, when Romania switched sides and joined the Allies, the German troops occupied key positions in Brașov. Dumitrache's detachment reacted quickly, and on 25 August, cleared the city of German troops, capturing 500 POWs and 6 guns. For the next few days his Mountain Corps, together with General Grigore Bălan's 1st Mountain Division, defended the front line between Întorsura Buzăului and Homorod, repulsing attacks of German and Hungarian troops, and blocking the roads for the Germans retreating northward from Muntenia. At the beginning of September, the Mountain Corps (which was subordinate to the 4th Army, under the command of Gheorghe Avramescu) went on the offensive, in cooperation with the Soviet 33rd Army, the subordinate of which was the Tudor Vladimirescu Division. During the Battle of Turda, Sfântu Gheorghe was liberated on 8 September and Târgu Mureș on 28 September. The next offensive started on 9 October; Dumitrache's Mountain Corps pursued the retreating German 8th Army westwards, entering Gherla on 14 October. The next day, the corps units were withdrawn to Brașov and Sinaia, while the 2nd and 3rd Mountain Divisions continued the offensive towards Hungary. On 22 November, Dumitrache was decorated by King Michael I with the Order of Michael the Brave, 3rd class with swords "for the way in which he distinguished himself in the heavy but successful actions during the period 24 August–12 October 1944, undertaken in Brașov, Sfântu Gheorghe, Târgu Mureș, Gherla, for the liberation of Transylvania." Only two other Romanian generals (also mountain troops commanders) received the model 1941 3rd and 2nd classes and the model 1944 3rd class of the order.

=== After the war ===
On 7 March 1945, Radio Moscow transmitted an informative note by which Dumitrache was accused of ordering, in October 1942, the killing of 600 prisoners, partisans, women, and children at Nalchik, as well as ordering the transport of materiel to Romania. As a result of this accusation, he was arrested on suspicion of war crimes, and held under house arrest in Brașov until 15 August 1946. Cleared of the charges, he returned as commander of the Mountain Corps with the approval of General Ivan Susaikov, the President of the Allied Control Commission in Romania. On 23 August 1947 Dumitrache was promoted to lieutenant general; he retired from the Army a week later.

In the fall of 1948, the Securitate resumed its persecutions, calling him more frequently for interrogations. In February 1949 he was arrested again by the Communist authorities for presumed war crimes, based on a referral prepared by Securitate General Alexandru Nicolschi. Dumitrache was held at Aiud, Jilava, and Văcărești prisons, ultimately being released in October 1950 for lack of evidence. Dumitrache settled down in Brașov, where he lived in obscurity, under surveillance by the Securitate. He spent many years writing his memoirs; the typed text was donated to the Brașov Museum of History and Archaeology, and was published twenty years after his death in 1977. He is buried at Saint Paraschiva Church's Groaveri Cemetery in Șcheii Brașovului.

Streets in Brașov and Târgu Mureș, as well as an alley in Buzău are named after him.

== Awards ==
- Order of the Crown, Commander class (8 June 1940)
- Order of Michael the Brave
  - 3rd Class (17 October 1941)
  - 2nd Class (15 February 1943), with swords
  - 3rd Class (22 November 1944), with swords
- Iron Cross (1939) 2nd and 1st Class
- Knight's Cross of the Iron Cross (2 November 1942)
- Order of the Star of Romania, Knight class
- Order of the Cross of Liberty, Finland
- Avântul Țării Medal
- Order of Cultural Merit
