= Alexandru Ioan Cuza National College =

Alexandru Ioan Cuza National College (Romanian: Colegiul Naţional "Alexandru Ioan Cuza") may refer to one of three educational institutions in Romania:

- Alexandru Ioan Cuza National College (Focșani)
- Alexandru Ioan Cuza National College (Galați)
- Alexandru Ioan Cuza National College (Ploiești)
