= Viorel Hrebenciuc =

Member of the Chamber of Deputies of Romania

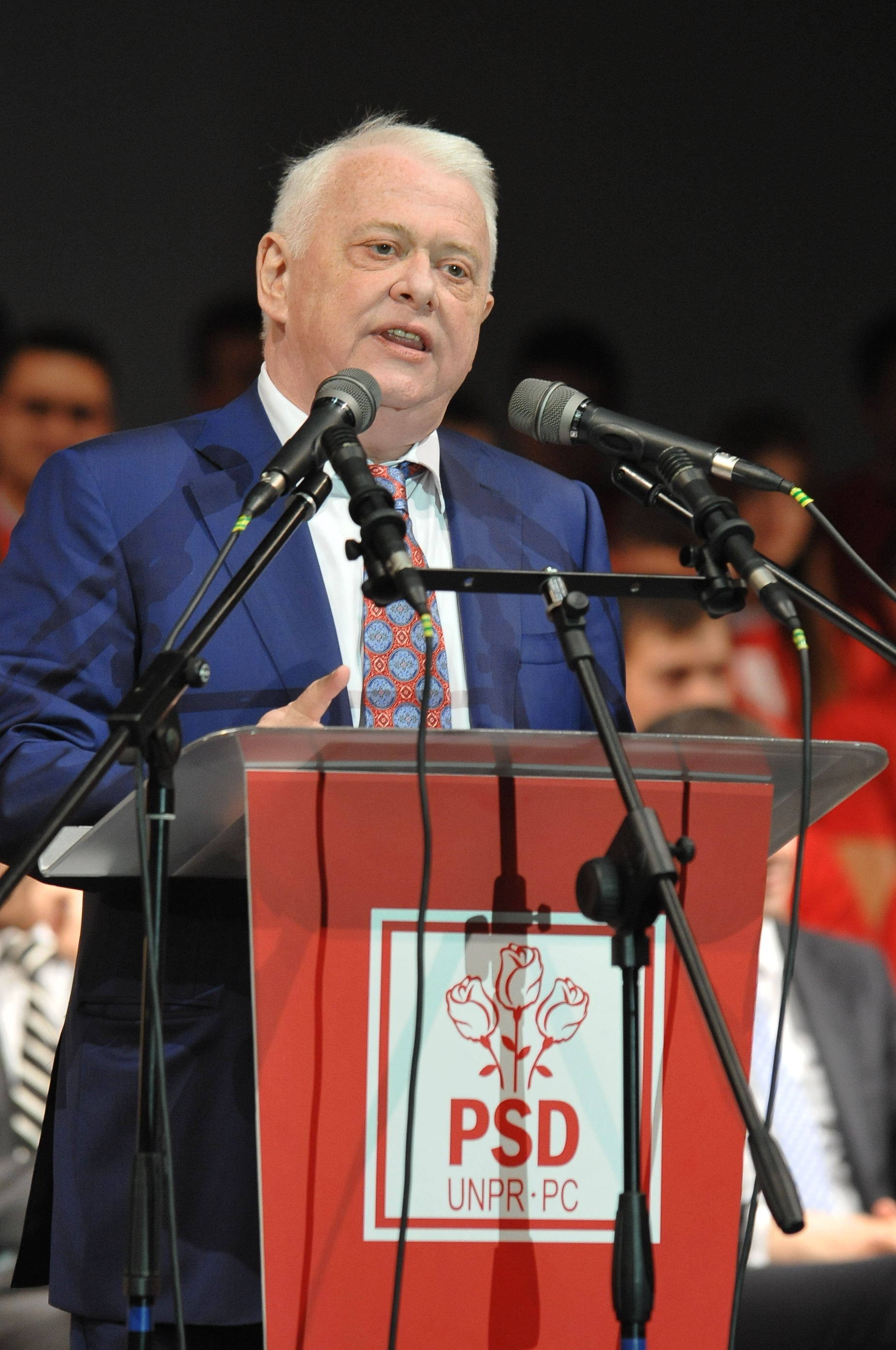
Hrebenciuc in 2014

Viorel Hrebenciuc (Romanian pronunciation: [vi.oˈrel hrebenˈt͡ʃjuk]; born 7 August 1953) is a Romanian politician and statistician. A member of the Social Democratic Party (PSD), he was also a member of the Chamber of Deputies of Romania for Bacău County from 1996 to 2014.

== Biography ==
He was born in Siminicea, Suceava County, and from 1973 to 1977, attended the Economic Cybernetics and Statistics Faculty of the Bucharest Academy of Economic Studies (ASE). From 1977 to 1980, he directed organizational planning at a Bacău firm. From 1980 to 1982, he was specialty inspector at the Bacău County Statistical Directorate, holding the same position at the Bacău County Council from 1982 to 1989. In 1979, the Bacău city-level Romanian Communist Party (PCR) organization recruited him as an economic affairs activist. Shortly thereafter, he was promoted to the county level, and remained in the role until 1989. Entering democratic politics following the Romanian Revolution of 1989, he served as Mayor of Bacău in 1990 and as Prefect of Bacău County from 1990 to 1992. From that year until 1996, he was secretary general of the Romanian government. Entering the Chamber in 1996, he has sat on the following committees: human rights, religious affairs and national minorities (1996–2000); European integration (2002–2006; president from 2003); and European affairs (2004–; president), also heading a joint committee for drafting new election laws (2003–2004).

He was the vice president of the Chamber from 2000 to 2004, and led the PSD group there from 2000 to 2010, except between 2004–2005, when he was deputy leader. He again became vice president in 2012, continuing after the December election.

In autumn 2014, the National Anticorruption Directorate charged Hrebenciuc in two cases: one involved corruption targeting forested land, while another alleged influence peddling with party colleague Dan Șova. The charges prompted him to resign from the Chamber and thus lose his parliamentary immunity. In September 2021, having been convicted of illegally intervening for a broadcast television license on behalf of Gheorghe Ștefan, he was sentenced to three years in prison.

Hrebenciuc was prominent within his party, with a reputation as an éminence grise, a negotiator, a creator of intrigues and instigator of personal attacks in the media. One consistent theme during the Presidency of Traian Băsescu was his feud with the head of state, described as Hrebenciuc's "mortal enemy". He actively participated in the unsuccessful 2007 referendum campaign to impeach Băsescu; during the same period, his son Andrei was dating Băsescu's daughter Elena. The relationship drew comparisons to the story of Romeo and Juliet, occurring as it did while the President called Hrebenciuc a "rose-coloured rat" and mentioned his "profound contempt" for the latter due to his behaviour in politics. He helped create the 2007–2008 alliance between the PSD and the National Liberal Party (PNL) after the latter had left the Băsescu-supported Justice and Truth Alliance (DA), and with the same party unsuccessfully pushed for Băsescu to appoint Klaus Iohannis as Prime Minister in 2009. He also headed the campaign of Mircea Geoană to unseat Băsescu later that year, a race Geoană narrowly lost, and led an effort to claim the election had been marred by fraud.

At one point before the election, he alleged that "everyone" knows Băsescu to be an alcoholic. In turn, Băsescu has criticised Hrebenciuc, labelling him "oligarch", "mafioso" and "string-puller" and contrasting him with himself. During their campaigns, Băsescu and the Democratic Liberal Party (PDL) that backs him have mentioned Hrebenciuc alongside the moguls Sorin Ovidiu Vântu and Dan Voiculescu and the controversial mayor Marian Vanghelie. When Iohannis was being promoted as a potential Prime Minister, Băsescu promised he would nominate someone independent of his predecessor Ion Iliescu, Hrebenciuc, Voiculescu and Vântu.

He is married, and Andrei is the couple's only child.
