= Mihail Lascăr =

Romanian general and Minister of Defense (1889–1959)

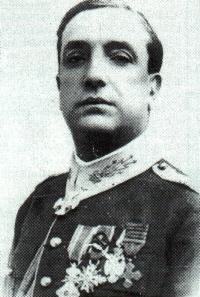
- Born: November 8, 1889; Târgu Jiu, Kingdom of Romania
- Died: July 24, 1959 (aged 69); Bucharest, Romanian People's Republic
- Military career
- Branch: Romanian Army
- Service years: 1910–1950
- Rank: General
- Commands: 1st Mountain Brigade; 6th Division; Horia, Cloșca și Crișan Division; Fourth Army
- Conflicts: Second Balkan War; World War I; World War II; Operation Barbarossa; Battle of the Sea of Azov; Battle of Crimea; Battle of Stalingrad
- Awards: Iron Cross, 1st class Knight's Cross with Oak Leaves; Order of Michael the Brave, 2nd class

69th Minister of Defense
- In office 29 November 1946 – 27 December 1947
- Prime Minister: Petru Groza
- Preceded by: Constantin Vasiliu-Rășcanu
- Succeeded by: Emil Bodnăraș

Mihail Lascăr (Romanian pronunciation: [mihaˈil ˈlaskər]; November 8, 1889 – July 24, 1959) was a Romanian general during World War II and Romania's Minister of Defense from 1946 to 1947.

He was born in Târgu Jiu, Gorj County, Kingdom of Romania, and graduated from the Infantry Officer School in 1910 with the rank of 2nd lieutenant. Lascăr fought in the Second Balkan War, being promoted to lieutenant in 1913. After Romania entered World War I in August 1916, he fought in the Romanian Campaign and was promoted to captain in November 1916. He distinguished himself in the battles of the 1917 Campaign and was promoted to major in September 1917. He then attended the Higher War School from 1919 to 1921 and advanced in rank to lieutenant colonel (1927), colonel (1934), and brigadier general (1939).

On January 10, 1941, he was appointed commanding officer of the 1st Mountain Brigade, an elite military unit of the Third Army. On June 22, 1941, Operation Barbarossa (the invasion of the Soviet Union by Nazi Germany and its allies) commenced, with the Mountain Brigade entering Northern Bukovina. From there, Lascăr and his unit swung East, crossing the rivers Dniester, Bug, and Dnieper. He fought in the Battle of the Sea of Azov, and then in the Battle of Crimea, remaining in charge of the Mountain Brigade until February 10, 1942. On March 11, 1942, he took charge of the 6th Division of the Romanian Third Army, being promoted to major general on October 25, 1942. The next month, he fought at the Battle of Stalingrad. After the Romanian front was broken at the Battle of Stalingrad, General Lascăr took command of the remains of the Romanian Third Army and kept fighting for 4 days. The only unit under his command that managed to escape encirclement was the battalion led by major Gheorghe Răscănescu. Lascăr was taken prisoner on November 22, 1942, but was promoted to Lieutenant-General in February 1943, dated back to the day he was captured. He spent the years 1943–1945 in captivity in the Soviet Union.

On April 12, 1945, Lascăr became commander of the Horia, Cloșca și Crișan Division; the political commissar attached to this Soviet-organized unit was the Communist activist Valter Roman. On September 12, 1945, Lascăr was named commander of the Fourth Army. He was a leader of the Electoral Commission of the Army, in advance of the general election of November 19, 1946. After a coalition led by the Romanian Communist Party won the election (through widespread intimidation tactics and electoral fraud), he was appointed Minister of Defense, holding this ministerial portfolio from November 29, 1946 until December 27, 1947, when he was replaced by Emil Bodnăraș. He was promoted to General on September 23, 1947.

On June 7, 1947, he signed the decree establishing the football club Asociația Sportivă a Armatei București, now CSA Steaua București. In 1949 he served as commander of the Military Academy in Bucharest. He was then Inspector-General of the Romanian Army until January 12, 1950, when he was discharged from active duty. He died in Bucharest in 1959.

== Awards ==
- German Iron Cross (1939) 2nd Class & 1st Class (7 January 1942)(24 September 1941)
- Knight's Cross of the Iron Cross with Oak Leaves (the first foreign recipient of this decoration)
- Order of Michael the Brave, 2nd class (31 December 1942)
