= Siminicea =

- Commune
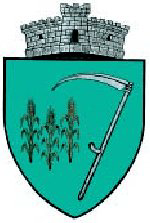
- Coat of arms

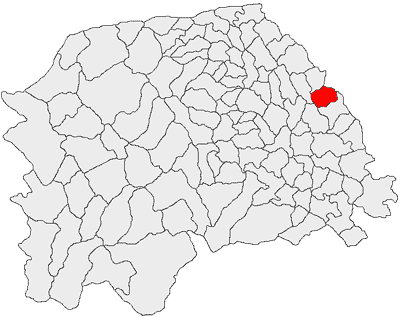
- Location in Suceava County

- Location in Romania
- Coordinates: 47°42′N 26°24′E
- Country: Romania
- County: Suceava

Government
  - Mayor (2020–2024): Vasile Clim (PNL)
- Area: 40.35 km^{2} (15.58 sq mi)
- Elevation: 296 m (971 ft)
- Population (2021-12-01): 2,595
  - Density: 64/km^{2} (170/sq mi)
- Time zone: EET/EEST (UTC+2/+3)
- Postal code: 727485
- Area code: +(40) 230
- Vehicle reg.: SV
- Website: siminicea.ro

Siminicea is a commune located in Suceava County, Western Moldavia, northeastern Romania. It is composed of two villages, Grigorești and Siminicea.

The commune is located in the eastern part of the county, 15 km (9.3 mi) northeast of the county seat, Suceava, just east of the Suceava Ștefan cel Mare International Airport and on the border with Botoșani County.

== Politics and local administration ==
=== Communal council ===
The commune's current local council has the following political composition, according to the results of the 2020 Romanian local elections:

Party	Seats	Current Council
National Liberal Party (PNL)	5	
Social Democratic Party (PSD)	3	
Save Romania Union (USR)	1	
Save Romania Union (PMP)	1	
Union for Bucovina (UpB)	1	

== Demographics ==
At the 2021 census, Siminicea had a population of 2,595; of those, 92% were Romanians.

== Natives ==
- Viorel Hrebenciuc (born 1953), politician
- Leonard Mociulschi (1889 – 1979), general during World War II
