= Leonard Mociulschi =

Romanian Major General of Polish origin (1889-1979)

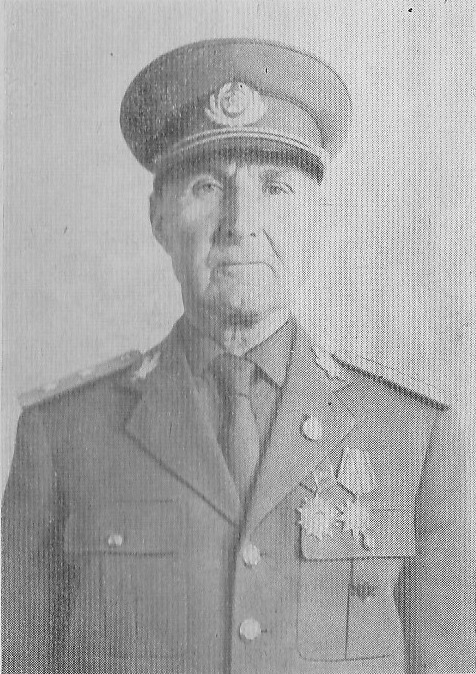
- Born: 27 March 1889; Siminicea, Kingdom of Romania
- Died: 15 April 1979 (aged 90); Brașov, Socialist Republic of Romania
- Military career
- Allegiance: Romanian Army
- Branch: Infantry, Vânători de munte
- Service years: 1910–1947
- Rank: Sublocotenent (1912); Locotenent (1916); Căpitan (1917); Maior (1920); Locotenent-colonel (1932); Colonel (1937); General de brigadă (1942); General de divizie (1944)
- Conflicts: Second Balkan War; World War I; First Battle of Oituz; Battle of Mărășești; World War II; Operation München
- Awards: Order of the Crown, Knight Class; Croix de Guerre; Order of the Star of Romania, Knight Class; Order of Michael the Brave, 2nd and 3rd Class; Iron Cross, 1st and 2nd Class; Knight's Cross of the Iron Cross; Order of the Cross of Liberty
- Website: www.general.mociulschi.ro

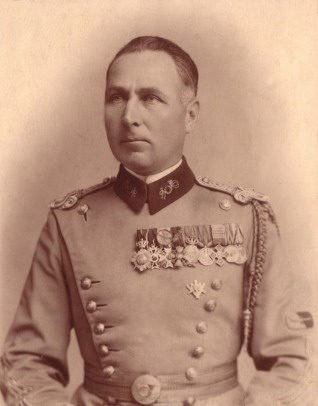
Captain Mociulschi, after being awarded the Order of the Star of Romania in 1919

Leonard Mociulschi (Romanian pronunciation: [le.oˈnard moˈt͡ʃjul.ski]) (Leonard Moczulski) (27 March 1889 – 15 April 1979) was a Romanian Major General of Polish origin during World War II.

== Biography ==
=== Early days ===
Mociulschi was born in Siminicea, Botoșani County (now in Suceava County), a descendant of Polish nobility that had been naturalized Romanian citizens. He started his military career with the 13th Regiment in Iași, and in 1910 he pursued his military training in Bucharest, at the Infantry Officers' School. Upon graduating in 1912 with the rank of Second Lieutenant (Sublocotonent), he was assigned as a platoon commander with the 8th Infantry Regiment in Botoșani. In 1913 he took part in the Second Balkan War.

=== World War I and the interwar ===
In 1916, at the beginning of the Romanian campaign of World War I, Mociulschi was in command of the 10th Company of the 29th Infantry Regiment (Dorohoi), holding the rank of lieutenant. Mociulschi participated in the Battle of Transylvania with the North Army and fought at the First Battle of Oituz in the fall of 1916. In the summer of 1917, he fought at the Battle of Mărășești with the Romanian 2nd Army. For his valor during the Oituz and Soveja battles he was decorated by King Ferdinand I of Romania and General Henri Mathias Berthelot, the commander of the French Military Mission in Romania, and promoted to the rank of captain.

After the end of the war, Mociulschi was promoted to major, and in 1932 he was given the command of a mountain battalion in Sighetu Marmației, with the rank of lieutenant colonel. In 1937 Mociulschi was promoted to colonel. On 10 February 1941, he was appointed deputy commander of the 1st Mountain Brigade, which was under the command of Brigadier General Mihail Lascăr and attached to the Romanian 3rd Army.

=== World War II ===
On 22 June 1941 Romania joined Operation Barbarossa on the side of the Axis, to reclaim the lost territories of Bessarabia and Northern Bukovina, which had been annexed by the Soviet Union in June 1940. At the beginning of July 1941, Mociulschi participated in Operation München, engaging Red Army forces in Northern Bukovina, in the Cernăuți area. During World War II Mociulschi fought on the Eastern Front against the Soviet Union and was promoted to brigadier general in 1942 and to major general in 1944.

After the coup d'état of 23 August 1944, Romania switched sides and became an enemy of Germany. On 20 September 1944, together with the Tudor Vladimirescu Division and the 337th Soviet Infantry Division, his Mountain Corps went on the offensive against the Axis forces, reaching the western border of Romania on October 13. For 70 days, starting on 20 December 1944, Mociulschi carried out combat operations in the Javořina massif and the White Carpathians of Czechoslovakia.

=== During the Communist era ===
On 12 August 1948, he was arrested by the Communist authorities in Codlea and sent without trial to penal colonies at the Danube–Black Sea Canal (Castelu), Onești, and Târgu Ocna. In 1955 the Military Tribunal dropped the case against him and assigned him to a forced domicile in Balș. He was rehabilitated in 1964 and died in Brașov in 1979. According to his wish, he was cremated, and his ashes were scattered by scouts of the 2nd Mountain Troops Brigade on the Moldoveanu, Pietrosul Rodnei, and Omu peaks.

== Bibliography ==
- Mociulschi, Leonard (1967). Asaltul vînătorilor de munte (in Romanian). București: Editura Militară. OCLC 38772429.

== Legacy ==
In Sighetu Marmației, the city where Mociulschi was garrisoned between 1932 and 1940, there is a statue in his memory. There are streets named after him in Beiuș, Botoșani, Brașov, Călărași, Oradea, Sighetu Marmației, and Suceava.

The 21st Mountain Hunters Battalion "General Leonard Mociulschi" bears his name. Founded in January 1940 and initially located in Baia Sprie, it is now based in Predeal and subordinated to the 2nd Mountain Troops Brigade that Mociulschi once commanded.

== Awards ==
- Avântul Țării (1913)
- Order of the Crown, Knight Class with spades (1917)
- Croix de Guerre (1918)
- Order of the Star of Romania, Knight Class (1919)
- Order of Michael the Brave
  - 3rd Class (17 October 1941)
  - 2nd Class (19 February 1944)
  - with Swords 3rd Class (23 March 1945)
- Iron Cross (1939) 2nd and 1st Class
- German Cross in Gold (25 October 1942)
- Knight's Cross of the Iron Cross (18 December 1943)
- Order of the Cross of Liberty (1943)

== Ginta massacre ==
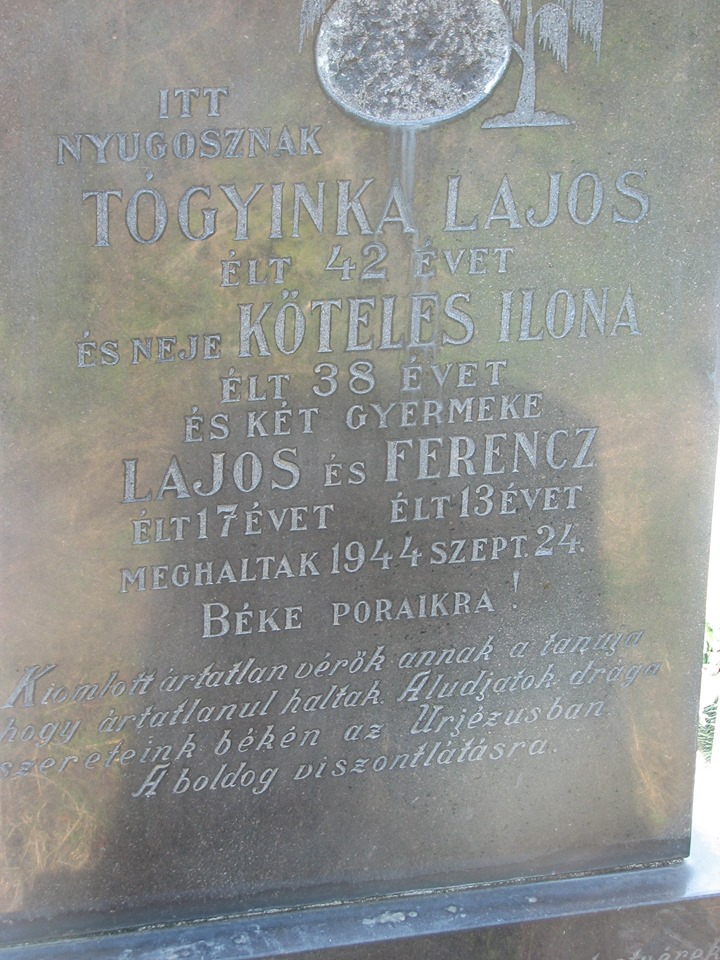

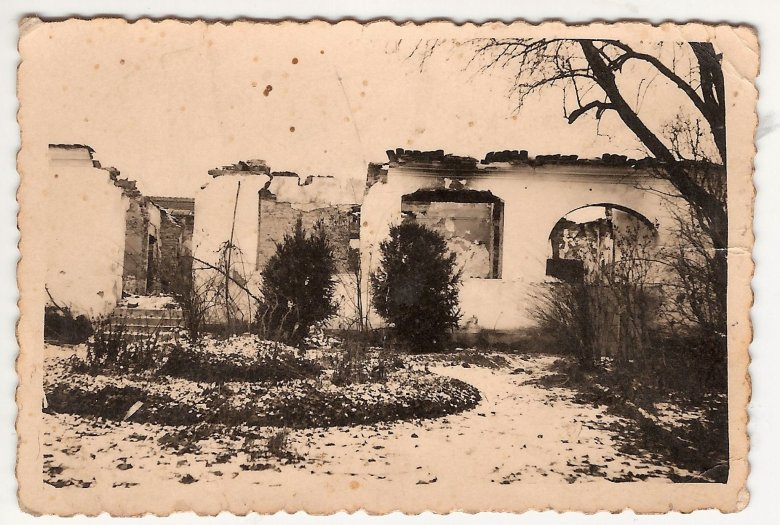
The day after the massacre in Gyanta

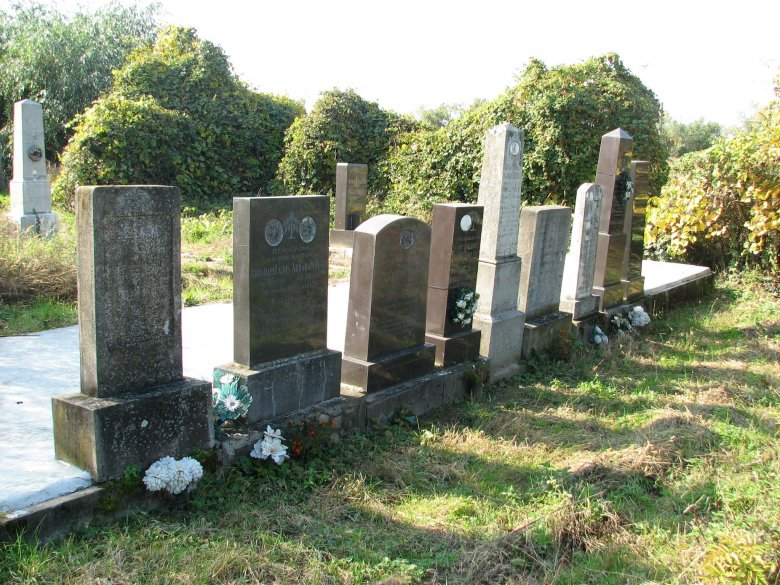
The mass grave of the civilians murdered by the Romanian Army in Gyanta

Leonard Mociulschi was the commander of the Romanian troops (6th and 11th Vânători de munte battalions) that entered on 24 September 1944 the village of Ginta (Hungarian: Gyanta). The majority of the villagers in Ginta were Hungarians (86% out of 358 inhabitants), with some Romanian families living there as well. Located in Southern Transylvania after the Second Vienna Award, Ginta had been occupied shortly by Hungarian forces when on 23 September 1944 a Romanian soldier was shot out of a window in the village. According to another source, fierce street fighting took place in the village on 24 September.

Under the pretext that the village was resisting the Romanian Army (when only a small unit left behind by the Hungarian Army to slow down the advance of the Romanians had put up resistance), Mociulschi allegedly ordered as retaliation the burning of the village. The Romanian Captain Teodor Brîndea, (spelled as Bridea or Bride by different sources) another officer and a soldier with a machine gun gathered the people from the streets, their yards and houses, took them to the edge of the village and executed them. Two days after the massacre the Romanian Army did not give the dead a proper burial and instead dumped the bodies of the villagers in a mass grave. It has been alleged that Mociulschi was responsible for the death of at least 47 unarmed civilians in the village, from the age of 2 to the age of 71, although other sources mention that the massacre was perpetrated by the Tudor Vladimirescu Division. Mociulschi was never charged for the massacre.

Zoltán Boros (now a filmmaker and composer), the son of the local Reformed priest and a survivor of the massacre, was then 5 years old. On that day his father was in a labor camp. He recalled that a local Romanian doctor, Augustin Pop, hid him and his then-seven-year-old sister in a dark room, and they were asked by their mother not to make any noise. Later on, his mother told him that the doctor dressed her as a maid so that it would not raise any suspicion when the Romanian officers arrived. One of the officers asked, "Well, we know the priest is in the camp, but where's his wife?" The doctor answered that she had already left with the retreating Hungarians. During the Ginta massacre, a villager named Lájos Togyinka showed what "Until death do us part" means because Togyinka was Romanian and the Romanian soldiers did not want to execute him, however his wife was Hungarian and Togyinka instead of fleeing chose death by the side of his wife. The officer in charge of the execution, Bridea, also ordered the 13 and 17-year-old-sons of Togyinka to be executed. The grave of the murdered Togyinka family reads: "Kioltott ártatlan vérök annak a tanúja, hogy ártatlanul haltak. Aludjatok drága szereteink békén az Úrjézusban. A boldog viszontlátásra" (translated to English: "Their spilled innocent blood is the proof that they died innocent. Sleep our beloved ones in God Allmighty. A blissful good bye.")
