= 2nd Mountain Troops Brigade =

2nd Mountain Troops Brigade "Sarmizegetusa"
- Brigada 2 Vânători de munte "Sarmizegetusa"
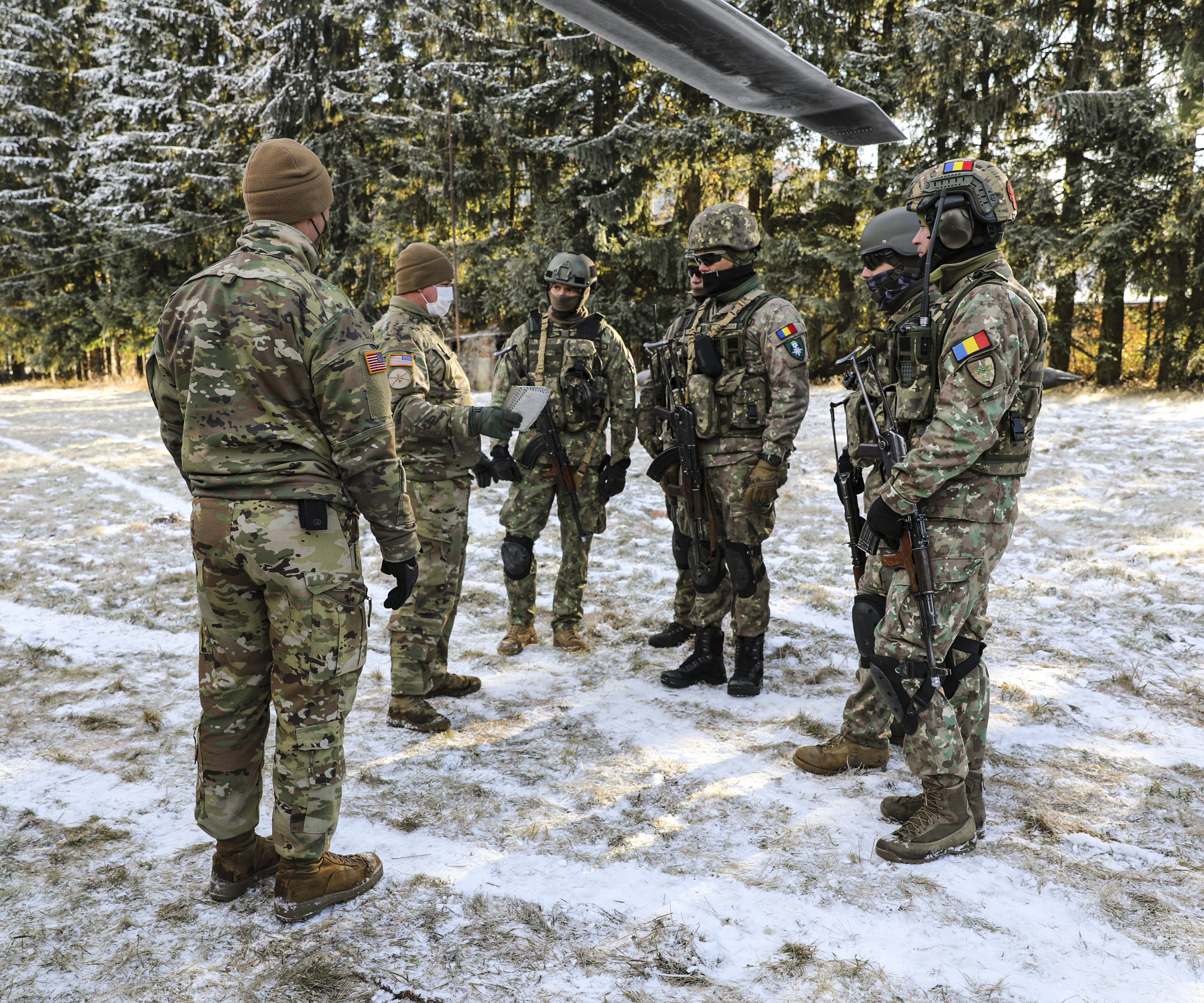
- Soldiers from the 206th Reconnaissance Company, 2nd Mountain Troops Brigade, and the 101st Combat Aviation Brigade during Operation Wolf Strike
- Active: 1 July 1923 – present
- Country: Romania
- Branch: Romanian Land Forces
- Type: Mountain troops
- Size: 6 battalions + other supporting companies
- Part of: 4th Infantry Division "Gemina"
- Garrison/HQ: Brașov, Romania
- Nickname: Divizia de cremene (Flint Division – during World War II)
- Anniversaries: 1 July
- Engagements: World War II: Operation München; Battle of the Sea of Azov; Battle of the Caucasus; Crimean offensive; Battle of Debrecen; Bratislava–Brno offensive; Prague offensive; Kosovo Force; Iraq War; Afghanistan War

Commanders
- Current commander: Colonel Florin George Cornea
- Notable commanders: Lieutenant general Ioan Dumitrache

Insignia
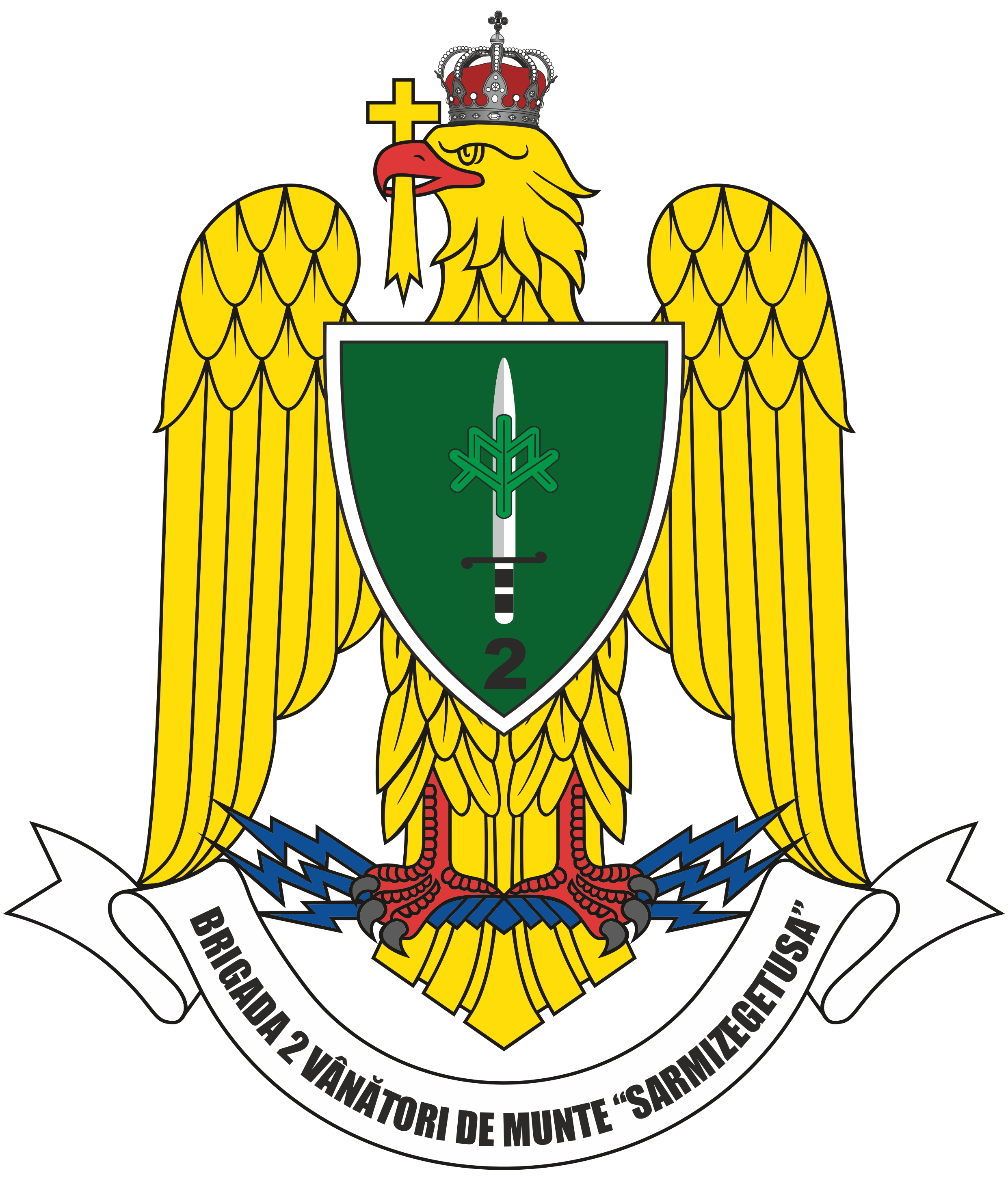
- Coat of Arms

The 2nd Mountain Troops Brigade "Sarmizegetusa" (Brigada 2 Vânători de Munte "Sarmizegetusa") is a mountain troops brigade of the Romanian Land Forces. The brigade was initially formed as the 2nd Mountain Troops Division on 1 July 1923. The unit distinguished itself in the campaigns of World War II from 1941 to 1945, receiving the nickname "Flint Division" (Divizia de cremene). It is now named after the most important Dacian military, religious and political centre. The 2nd Mountain Troops Brigade is currently subordinated to the 4th Infantry Division and has its headquarters in Brașov.

== History ==
On 1 July 1923, the 2nd Mountain Troops Division (Divizia 2 Vânători de Munte) was formed in Bistrița. In 1937, the two existing Mountain Divisions were converted to the 1st and 2nd Mountain Brigades. The same year, the 2nd Brigade was renamed to the 2nd Mixed Mountain Brigade and until 1940, it guarded the northern border of the country.

=== World War II ===
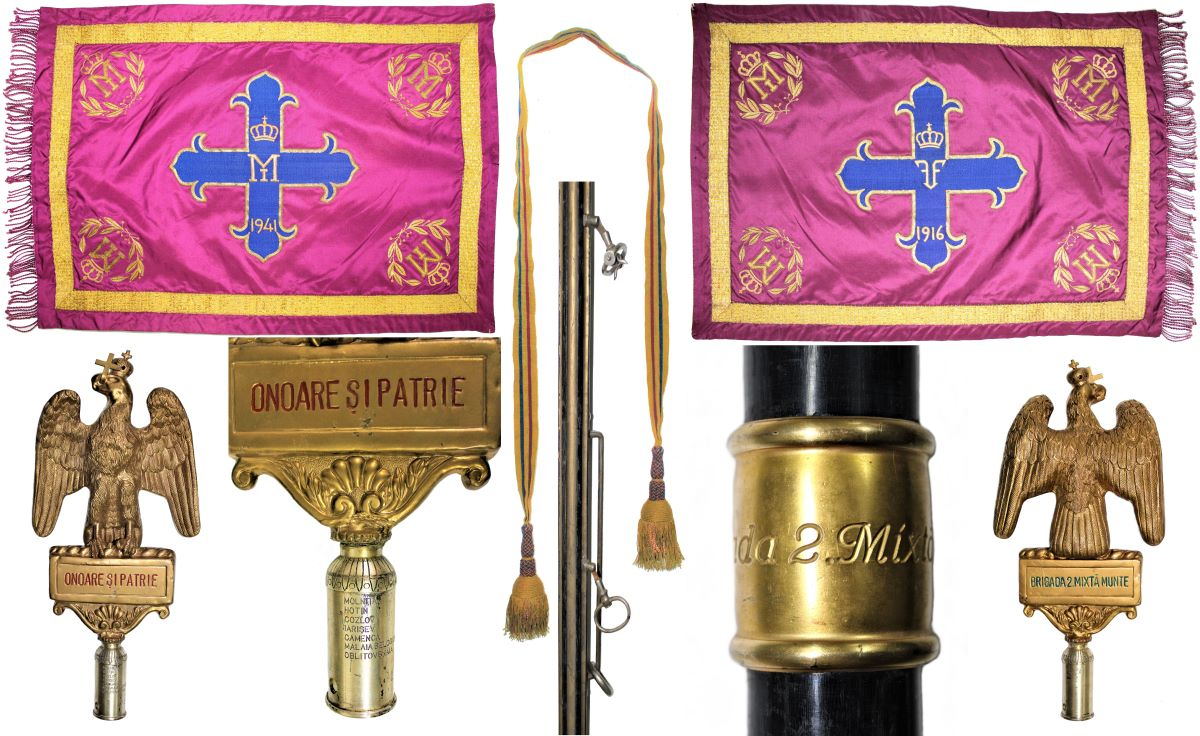
Command standard of the 2nd Mixed Mountain Brigade

After Romania entered the war in 1941, the 2nd Mixed Mountain Brigade under the command of General Ioan Dumitrache and assigned to the Mountain Corps joined the offensive in Bessarabia on the Mihăileni–Hotin direction and participated in the crossing of the Dniester, Bug, and Dnieper rivers. By autumn, the brigade reached the Sea of Azov where it managed to resist the counter-offensive of the Soviet 9th and 18th Armies. Although the Soviets eventually broke through the front in several places, the brigade rearranged itself on new defensive positions and held out against further attacks. Until 5 November, the brigade cleared other Red Army forces in the Berdiansk sector in the aftermath of the Battle of the Sea of Azov. On 7 December the 2nd Brigade was recalled to the country to recover from the losses it suffered.

On 15 March 1942, the 2nd Mixed Mountain Brigade was transformed into the 2nd Mountain Division (Divizia 2 Munte) which had the following organization for the remainder of the war:

- 4th Mountain Group
  - 7th Mountain Battalion "Ioan Buteanu"
  - 8th Mountain Battalion
  - 15th Mountain Battalion
- 5th Mountain Group
  - 9th Mountain Battalion
  - 10th Mountain Battalion
  - 16th Mountain Battalion
- 2nd Mountain Artillery Group
  - 2nd Mountain Howitzer Battalion
  - 4th Mountain Gun Battalion
  - 5th Mountain Gun Battalion

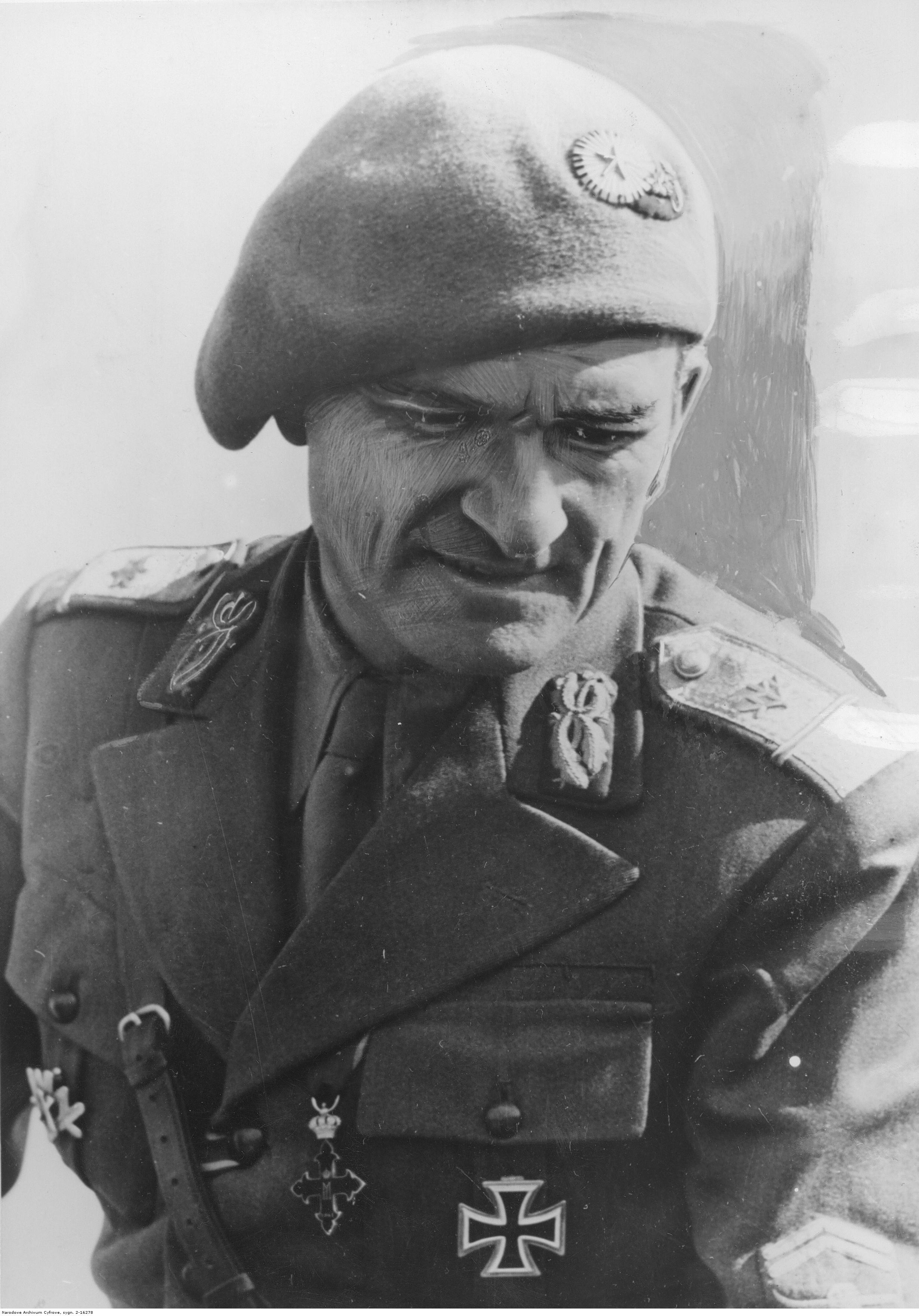
General Ioan Dumitrache in November 1942

The division was sent to the Caucasus front in July 1942. Under the 1st Panzer Army, the 2nd Mountain Division forced the crossing of the Baksan River and established a bridgehead near the village of Kysburun. In October, the division launched an offensive towards Nalchik and after heavy fighting, the division broke through the Soviet lines and reached its objective on 28 October. Suffering only 820 casualties, the Vânători de Munte inflicted heavy losses on the enemy and took 3,079 prisoners.

Continuing with the offensive, the 2nd Mountain Division under the command of Ioan Dumitrache reached the easternmost point of the campaign on the Eastern Front, about 20 km (12 mi) away from Grozny. After the Battle of Stalingrad, the Soviet armies began their offensive. Supplied with new types of American weaponry and equipment, the Soviet armies encircled the German 13th Panzer Division south of the village of Mayramadag, but the soldiers of the 4th Mountain Group managed to secure the Alagir-Ordzhonikidze road which allowed the German tanks to retreat. On 28 January 1943, the 2nd Mountain Division crossed the Kuban bridgehead and, while subordinated to the 17th German Army, it continued fighting until March. On 28 March, the division was moved to Crimea for recovery.

Having participated in an uninterrupted campaign for 203 days, the division earned the nickname "Flint Division", while its soldiers were nicknamed "the green devils" by their Soviet adversaries. The division received praises from both the Romanian command and the German allies, with more than 400 Iron Crosses being awarded to its soldiers.

Between December 1943 and January 1944, the 2nd Mountain Division acted in the Yayla Mountains, eliminating over 3,700 partisans in the region. By April 1944, the division was split in two, with one part remaining at Sevastopol to defend the city. The units of the division that remained in Sevastopol, the 9th and 10th Mountain Battalions, covered the retreat of the German and Romanian forces during Operation 60,000, the Romanian code name for the evacuation of Crimea. The two battalions, along with the 2nd Mountain Group of the 1st Mountain Division could not be evacuated due to the Soviet artillery fire and had to fight until the end. Retreating to Romania, the division was placed on the flank of the Romanian 1st Army in August 1944. After the 23 August coup, the division fought against German units in Transylvania and in September participated in the liberation of Cluj.

The division continued fighting in Hungary, crossing the Tisza on 7 November and by the end of the year reaching the Mátra and Bükk mountains. In 1945, the 2nd Mountain Division entered Czechoslovakia and fought in the Tatra Mountains, nearly reaching Prague by 12 May. After the war, the 2nd Division was regrouped north of Brno.

=== Post-war to present day ===
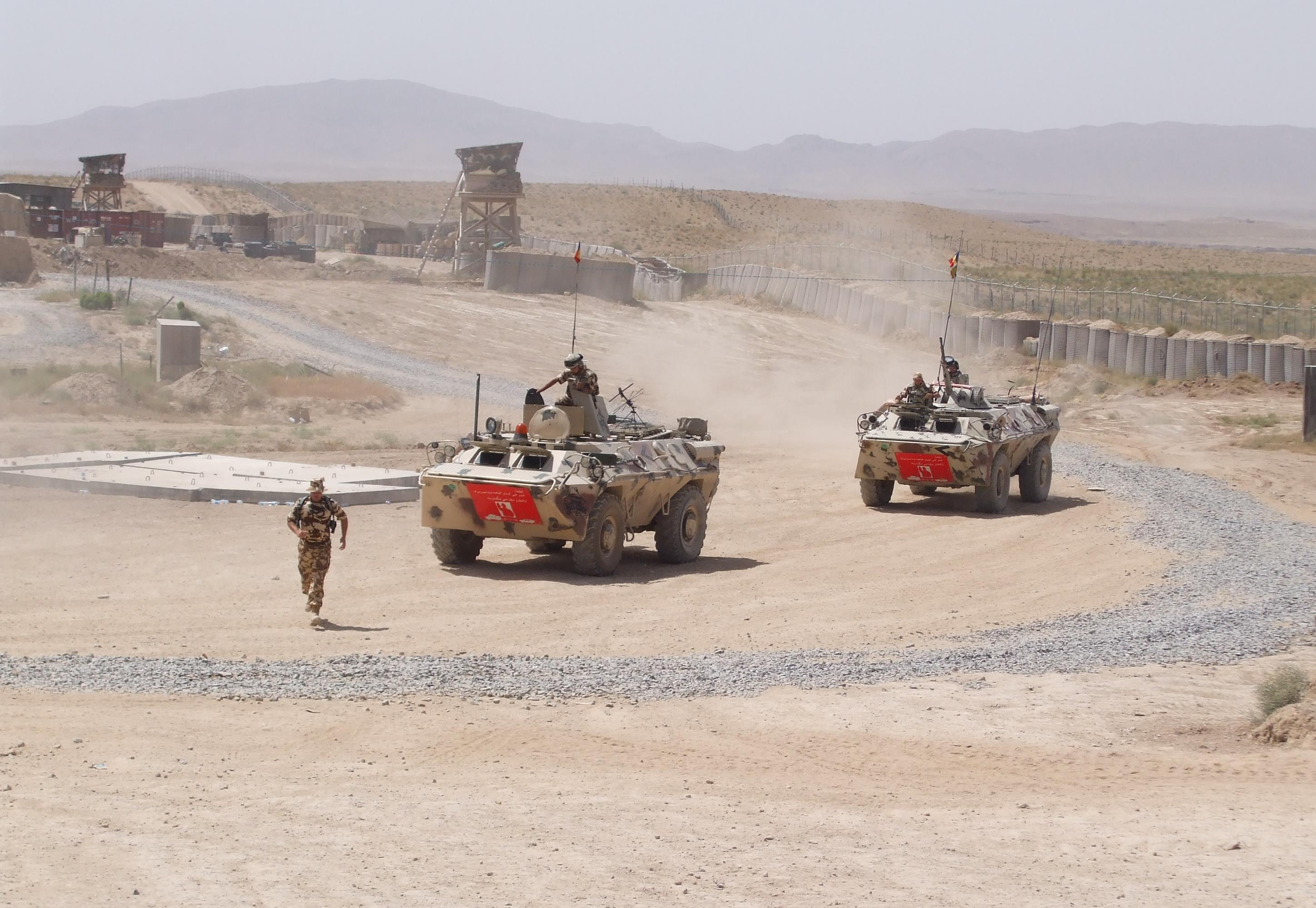
The 33rd Battalion of the 2nd Brigade in Afghanistan in 2007

After the war, the division was disbanded in 1947 and merged with the 1st Mountain Division. In 1951, it was reestablished with the name of 14th Mountain Division then reorganized as the 2nd Mountain Troops Brigade (Brigada 2 Vânători de Munte) in 1958. It was disbanded again in 1961 only to be reestablished three years later. In 1974, it received the honorific name "Sarmizegetusa". After the Romanian revolution of 1989, the 2nd Mountain Troops Brigade underwent a restructuring period. The structural reorganization process of the brigade was completed in early 2003, with the subordination of the 33rd Mountain Troops Battalion.

Between 2005 and 2007, the units of the brigade went through a NATO certification process and began to be deployed in the theaters of operations outside of Romania. The 33rd Mountain Troops battalion was deployed in Afghanistan as part of the ISAF. The 2nd Mountain Troops Brigade is affiliated with NRDC-GR.

Units from the brigade were often deployed to peacekeeping missions as part of KFOR in Kosovo, UNAMI in Iraq, and ISAF in Afghanistan. During its deployments to Afghanistan, eight soldiers of the brigade lost their lives. Until 2015, the 2nd Mountain Troops Brigade was subordinated to the 1st Infantry Division when the division was reorganized as the Multinational Division Southeast. On 30 June 2023, festivities were held in Brașov's Piața Sfatului to commemorate the 100th anniversary of the founding of the brigade.

== Organization ==
- 2nd Mountain Troops Brigade "Sarmizegetusa", in Brașov
  - 21st Mountain Troops Battalion "General Leonard Mociulschi", in Predeal, with Otokar Cobra II
  - 30th Mountain Troops Battalion "Dragoslavele", in Câmpulung, with Otokar Cobra II
  - 33rd Mountain Troops Battalion "Posada", in Curtea de Argeș, with Otokar Cobra II
  - 206th Artillery Battalion "General Mihail Lăcătușu", in Ghimbav
  - 228th Anti-aircraft Defence Battalion "Piatra Craiului", in Brașov, with Oerlikon GDF-003 AA guns and KP-SAM Chiron
  - 229th Logistic Support Battalion, in Brașov
  - 206th Reconnaissance Company, with Otokar Cobra II
  - 230th Support Company
  - 231st Military Police Company
  - 249th Communications and Information Technology Company
  - 363rd Engineer Company
  - 391st CBRN Defence Company

== Decorations ==
Pre–1989

The 2nd Mountain Brigade has received the following decorations:

- Order of Michael the Brave (1941)

Post–1989

The 2nd Mountain Troops Brigade has received the following decorations:

- Order of Military Virtue, Peacetime (Knight – 2008; Officer – 2016; Commander – 2023)

== Bibliography ==
- Suman, Gheorghe; Negrea, Cristian (2014). "Vânătorii de munte | Al doilea război mondial". Tactică și Strategie (in Romanian). Baia Mare: Editura Marist. ISSN 2360-0039.
