= Zoltán Szügyi =

Hungarian officer during World War II

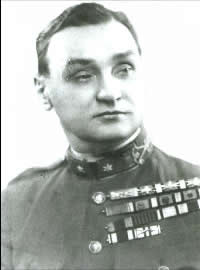
Zoltán Szügyi

Zoltán Szügyi (9 February 1896, Huszt, Kingdom of Hungary – 23 November 1967, Budapest, Hungarian People's Republic) was a Hungarian officer during World War II. He was a recipient of the Knight's Cross of the Iron Cross of Nazi Germany.

Szügyi commanded the Szent László Infantry Division during its entire existence between October 1944 and May 1945. He surrendered to the British Army around Klagenfurt, but was handed over to the Hungarian authorities in March 1946. Following his capture, he was sentenced to 10 years imprisonment on 28 November 1949 as a war criminal, and released in 1957.

== Awards ==
- Iron Cross (1939) 2nd and 1st Class
- Knight's Cross of the Iron Cross (12 January 1945)
