= Szent László Infantry Division =

Hungarian Infantry Division during World War II

- Szent László hadosztály
- Active: October 1944 – 1945
- Allegiance: Hungary
- Role: Infantry
- Size: Division
- Patron: Saint László
- Engagements: World War II: Siege of Budapest; Vienna Offensive

The Szent László Infantry Division (Hungarian: Szent László hadosztály; English: Saint Ladislaus Infantry Division) was a Hungarian infantry unit formed in the final year of World War II. It was made up of a mix of army and air force personnel. The division saw action at Budapest, in western Hungary, and in southeastern Austria.

== Unit History ==
In October 1944, the Szent László Infantry Division was formed. Elements of the division saw action for the first time on 19 December when they were used as emergency troops to plug gaps in the front. This was just before the Battle of Budapest. The units engaged suffered heavy losses during the fighting in Hungary.

The unit did not fight as a division until April, 1945. By then, it had received manpower from several other divisions to cover its earlier losses.

The division continued to fight in northern Croatia and southern Austria until the end of the war. At that point, the division crossed the Carnic Alps and entered Carinthia where it surrendered to British forces.

The personnel of the Szent László Infantry Division were allowed to keep their weapons until discussions between the British and Yugoslav partisans were settled. Subsequently, the division's remaining personnel were transferred to regular prisoner of war camps in Germany.

The Szent László Infantry Division was named for Saint László (also known as Ladislaus). Saint László was the King of Hungary from 1077-1095, as well as the patron saint of military men and exiles.

== Commanders ==
- Major-General Zoltán Szügyi (born 1896; died 1967) - 12 October 1944 to 8 May 1945

== Sources ==
- Niehorster, Leo W. G. - The Royal Hungarian Army 1920–1945, 313 pages, ISBN 1-891227-19-X

== See also ==
- Vienna Offensive
