= Alexandru Ioan Cuza National College (Focșani) =

Coordinates: 45.7028845°N 27.190465°E

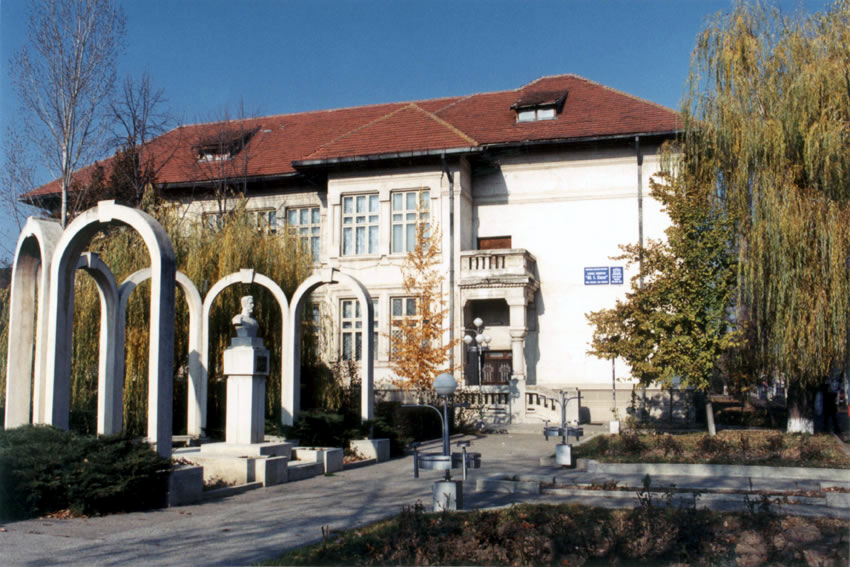
Alexandru Ioan Cuza National College

Alexandru Ioan Cuza National College (Romanian: Colegiul Național "Alexandru Ioan Cuza") is a high school in Focșani, Vrancea County, Romania. It was founded in 1864, after Alexandru Ioan Cuza, the first Domnitor of the United Principalities of Moldavia and Wallachia, enacted a Law on Education, establishing tuition-free and compulsory public education for primary schools.

The main building dates to 1930–1931. It is listed as a historic monument by Romania's Ministry of Culture and Religious Affairs.

== Alumni ==
- Ioan Dumitrache
