= Vânători de munte =

Mountain infantry of the Romanian Army

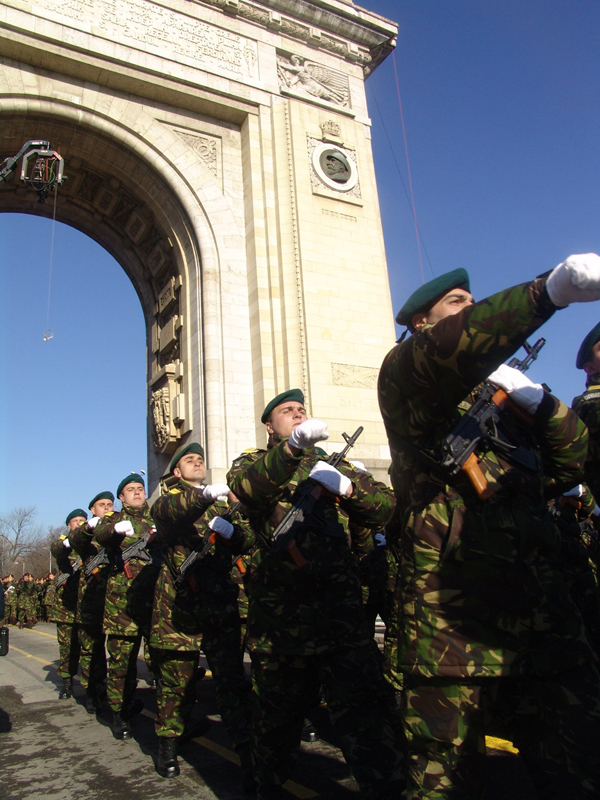
- Active: Since 1916
- Country: Romania
- Branch: Romanian Land Forces
- Type: Mountain troops
- Size: Two brigades
- Garrison/HQ: 2nd Mountain Troops Brigade - Brașov; 61st Mountain Troops Brigade - Miercurea Ciuc

Insignia
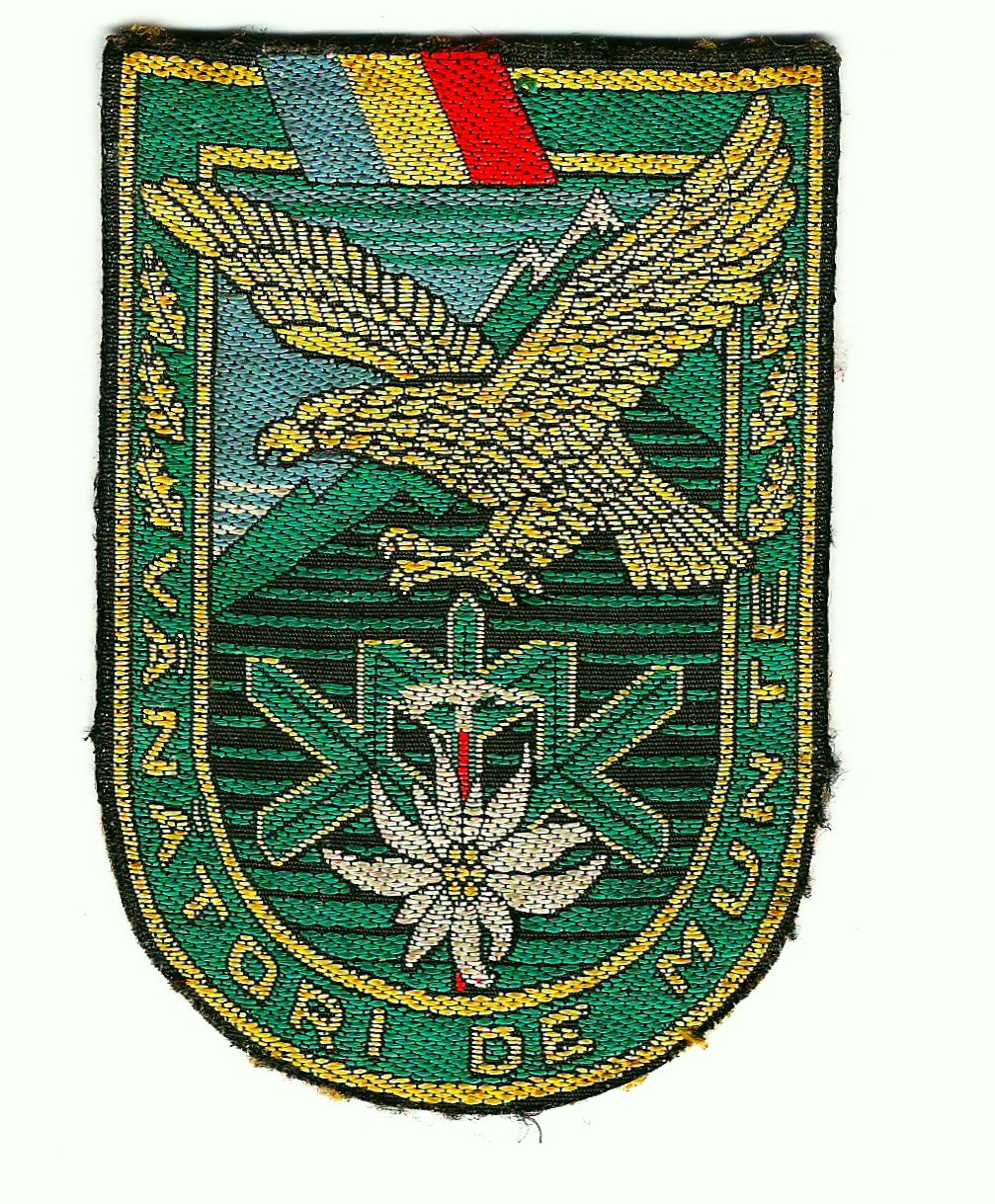
- Shoulder patch

The vânători de munte (Romanian pronunciation: [vɨnəˈtorʲ de ˈmunte], transl. "Mountain Huntsmen") are the elite mountain troops of the Romanian Land Forces. They were first established as an independent Army Corps in 1916 during World War I, and became operational in 1917 under Corpul de Munte designation.

== History ==
=== Origins and World War I ===
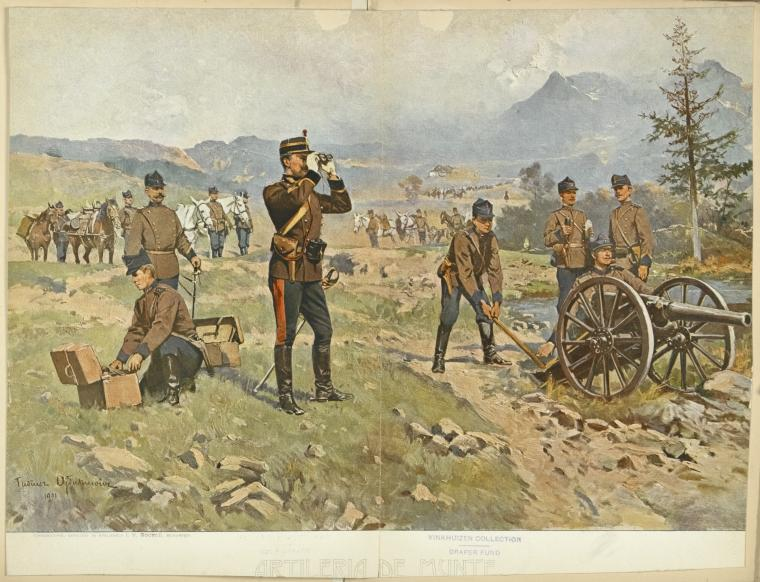
Romanian 63 mm Armstrong mountain gun, 1880s-90s

In 1883, the Mountain Artillery was formed with one battery assigned to each of the four Army Corps. In 1913 and 1915, two divizions of Mountain Artillery were formed, each with 4 batteries. These were further integrated into the 1st Mountain Artillery Regiment in 1916, with the headquarters in Târgu Jiu. Another 8 batteries were added to the Regiment before Romania's entry in World War I.

Despite several initiatives starting in 1889, the first mountain troops were formed in November 1916. Through Order no. 294, the Military School of Skiing was transformed in the "Corps of Mountain Hunters" (Corpul Vânătorilor de munte). It was organized in three battalions, each with three companies. In January 1917, the Corps was reorganized into the "Mountain Hunter Battalion" (Batalionul Vânătorilor de Munte). It consisted of 5 infantry companies, 2 machine gun companies and a wireless telegraphy section. Each company took a nickname: the 1st was nicknamed Tigrii, the 2nd Șoimii, the 3rd Haiducii, the 4th Leii, and the 5th Pandurii, while the 1st and 2nd machine gun companies were nicknamed Smeii and Balaurii respectively. This tradition was kept until after the Second World War.

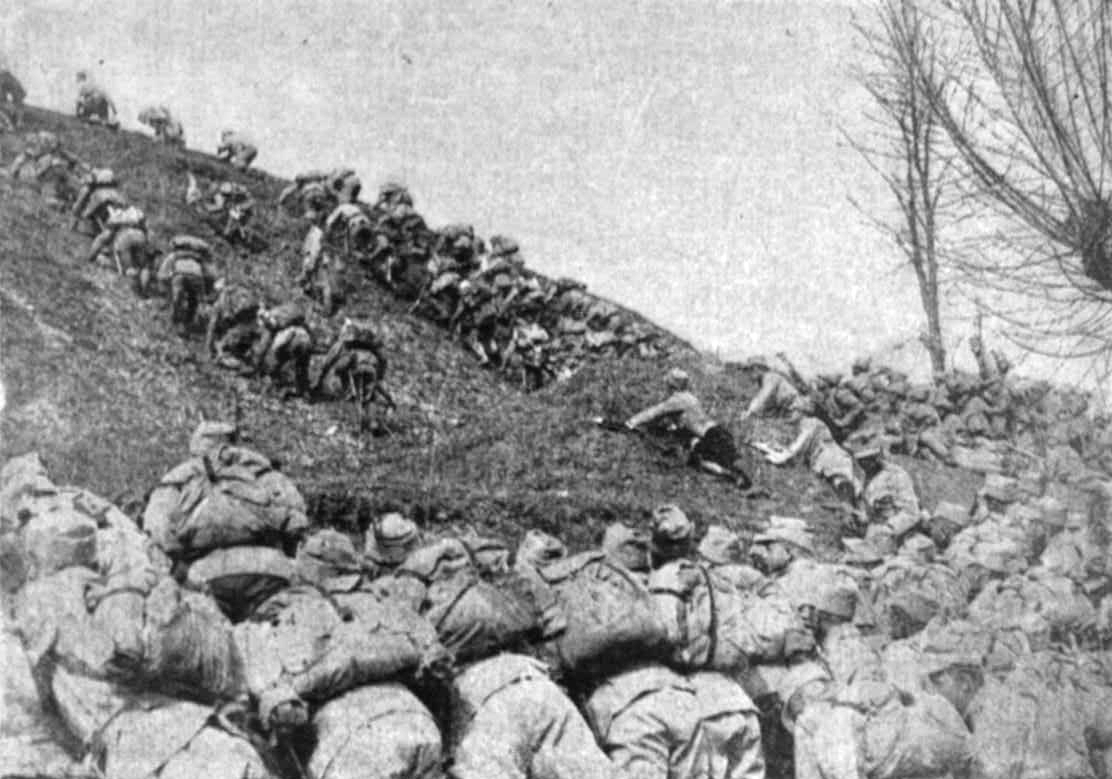
The vânători de munte at Cireșoaia

The Mountain Hunter Battalion first saw combat during the Third Battle of Oituz. The vânători de munte companies were deployed at Cireșoaia and Coșna, where between 20th and 26 August 1917 they fought against the Württemberg mountain battalion of the German Alpenkorps, winning the engagement. The Germans eventually managed to take the two peaks, but failed to break the Romanian lines further. On 30 October 1917, the Battalion was transformed into a Regiment, and Prince Carol was named as its honorific commander. From March 1919, the Regiment participated in the Hungarian–Romanian War.

=== Interwar to World War II ===
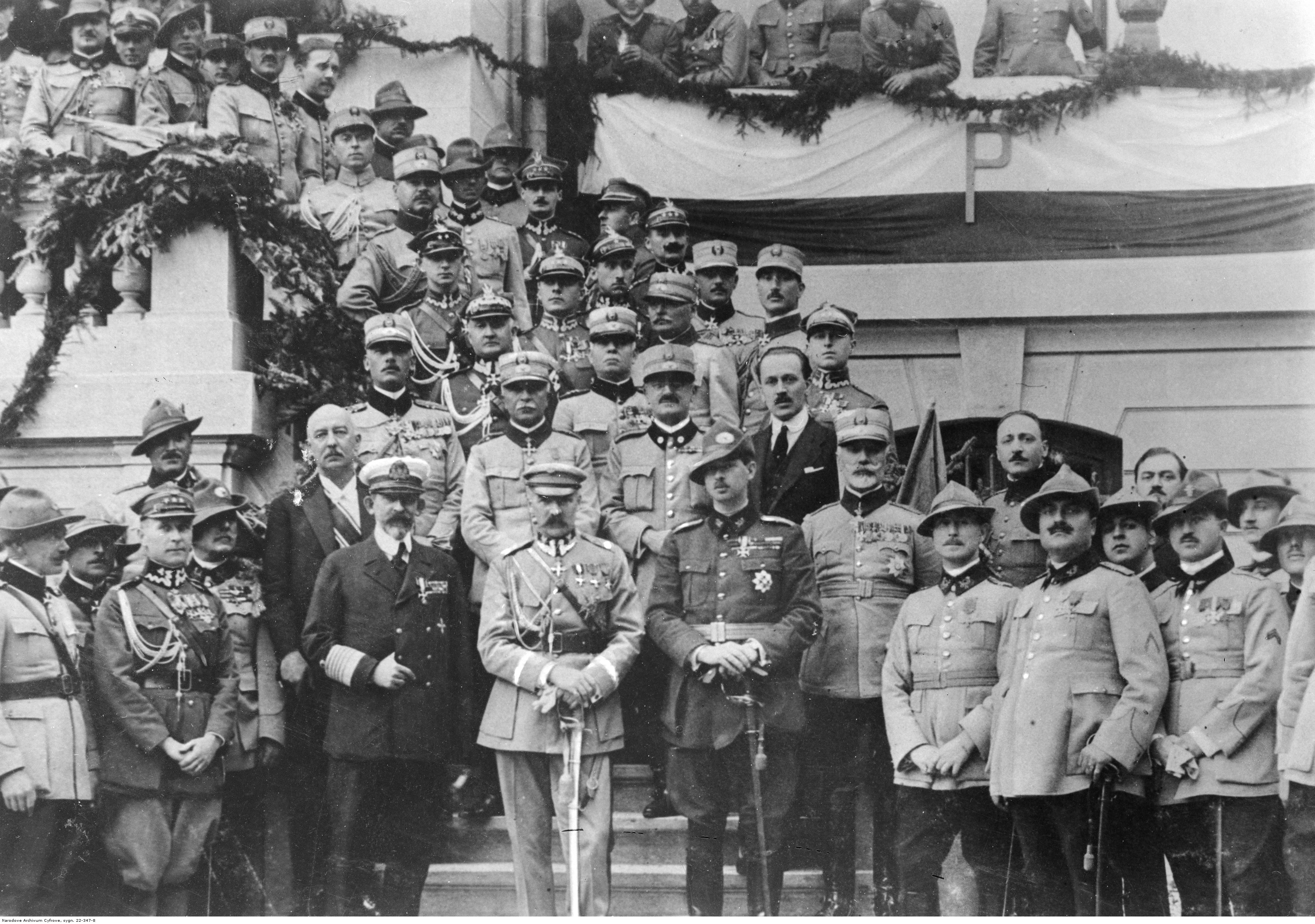
Prince Carol and the honorary company of the mountain troops during Józef Piłsudski's visit in 1922 at Sinaia

In 1923, the first two vânători de munte divisions were formed: the 1st Division at Brașov, and the 2nd Division at Bistrița. The foundations of training, rules and principles of fighting in the mountains were also laid out.

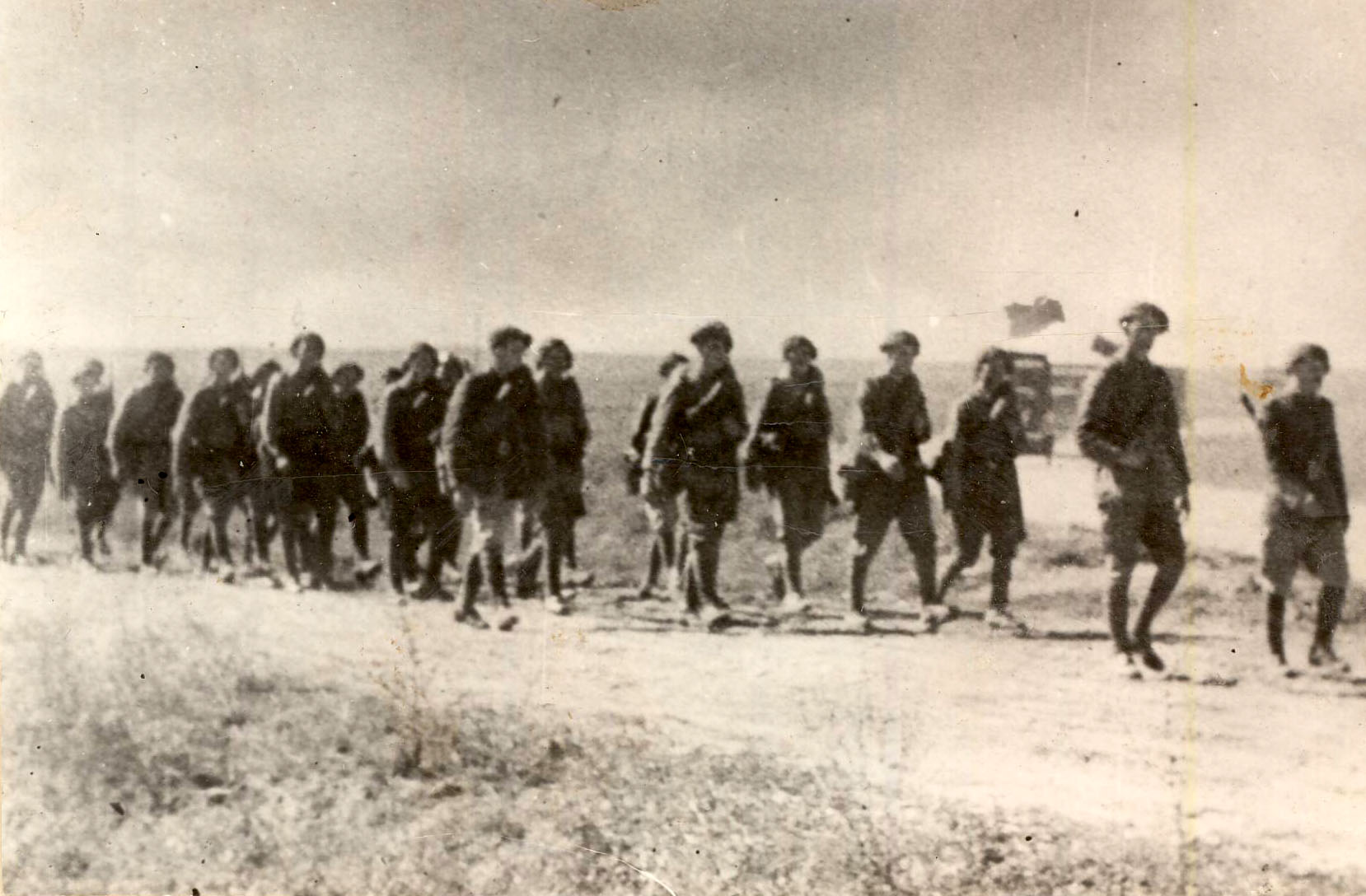
On the Eastern Front, 1941

The Romanian vânători de munte saw action in World War II on the Eastern Front in some of the harshest battles — including the sieges of Sevastopol and Stalingrad — where their performance lived up to their reputation: virtually all their commanders from brigade level and up received the Knight's Cross of the Iron Cross, with general Mihail Lascăr being the first foreigner to receive Oak Leaves on 22 November 1942 (see List of foreign recipients of the Knight's Cross). The greatest single achievement of the vânători de munte was the capture of Nalchik on 2 November 1942, the farthest point of the Nazi Germany advance into the Caucasus. This victory earned Romanian Brigadier General Ioan Dumitrache the Knight's Cross of the Iron Cross. After the coup d'état of 23 August 1944, the vânători de munte fought on the Soviet side, notably in the Tatra Mountains.

After the end of the war, one of the first measures taken by the Soviets in occupied Romania was to disband the mountain troops. Shortly after the Soviet occupation troops left Romania in 1958, the vânători de munte were re-established again as a distinct branch of Communist Romania's People's Ground Forces.

There are currently two brigades operational, one subordinated to the 2nd Infantry Division (the 2nd Mountain Troops Brigade "Sarmizegetusa"), and another one subordinated to the 4th Infantry Division (the 61st Mountain Troops Brigade "General Virgil Bădulescu"). Mountain troops units participated in the occupation of Iraq and Afghanistan.

== Image gallery ==
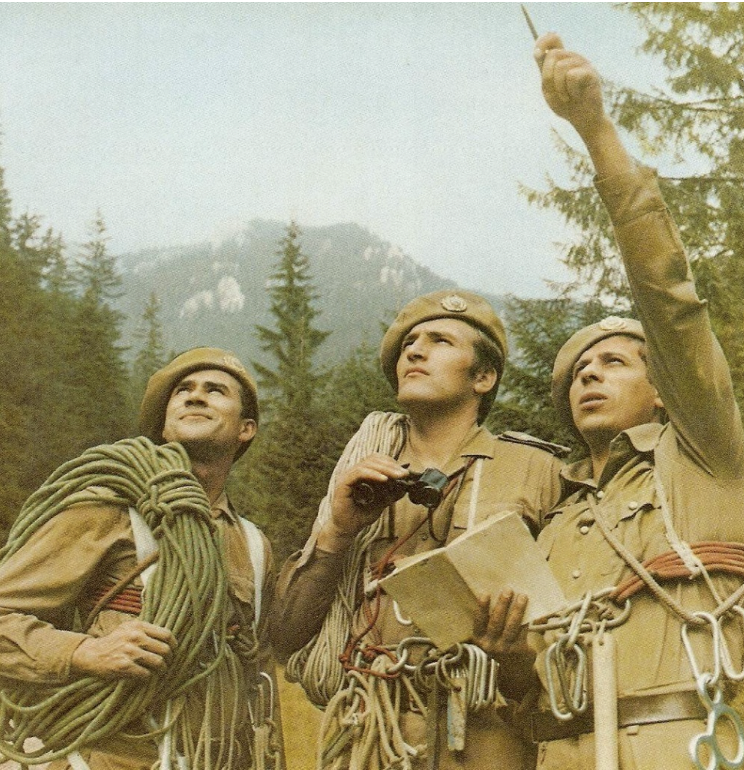
Romanian mountain troops 1970s

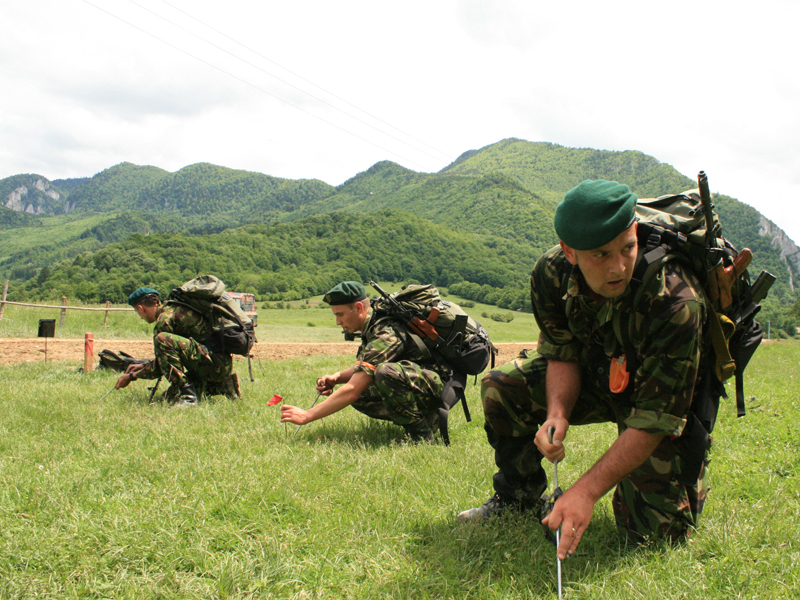
Vânători de munte during a military competition

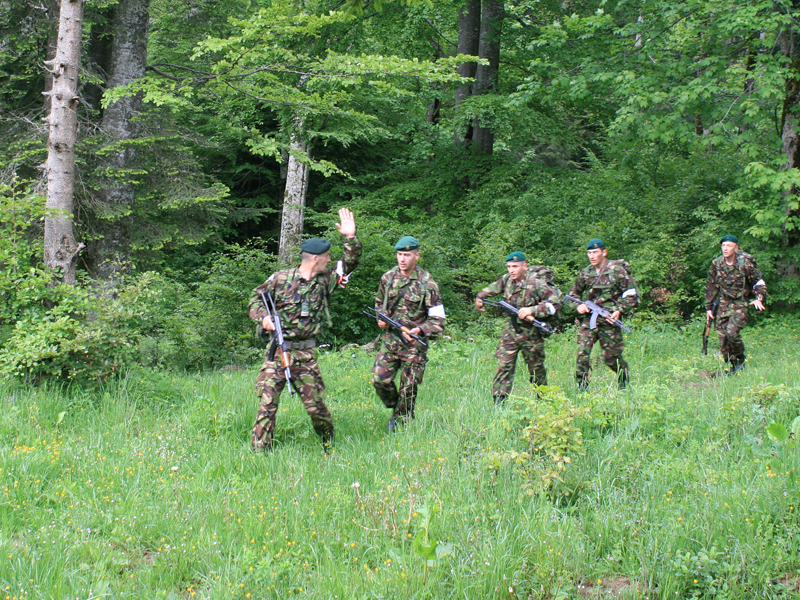
Troops from the 2nd and 61st Mountain Troops Brigade during a military competition

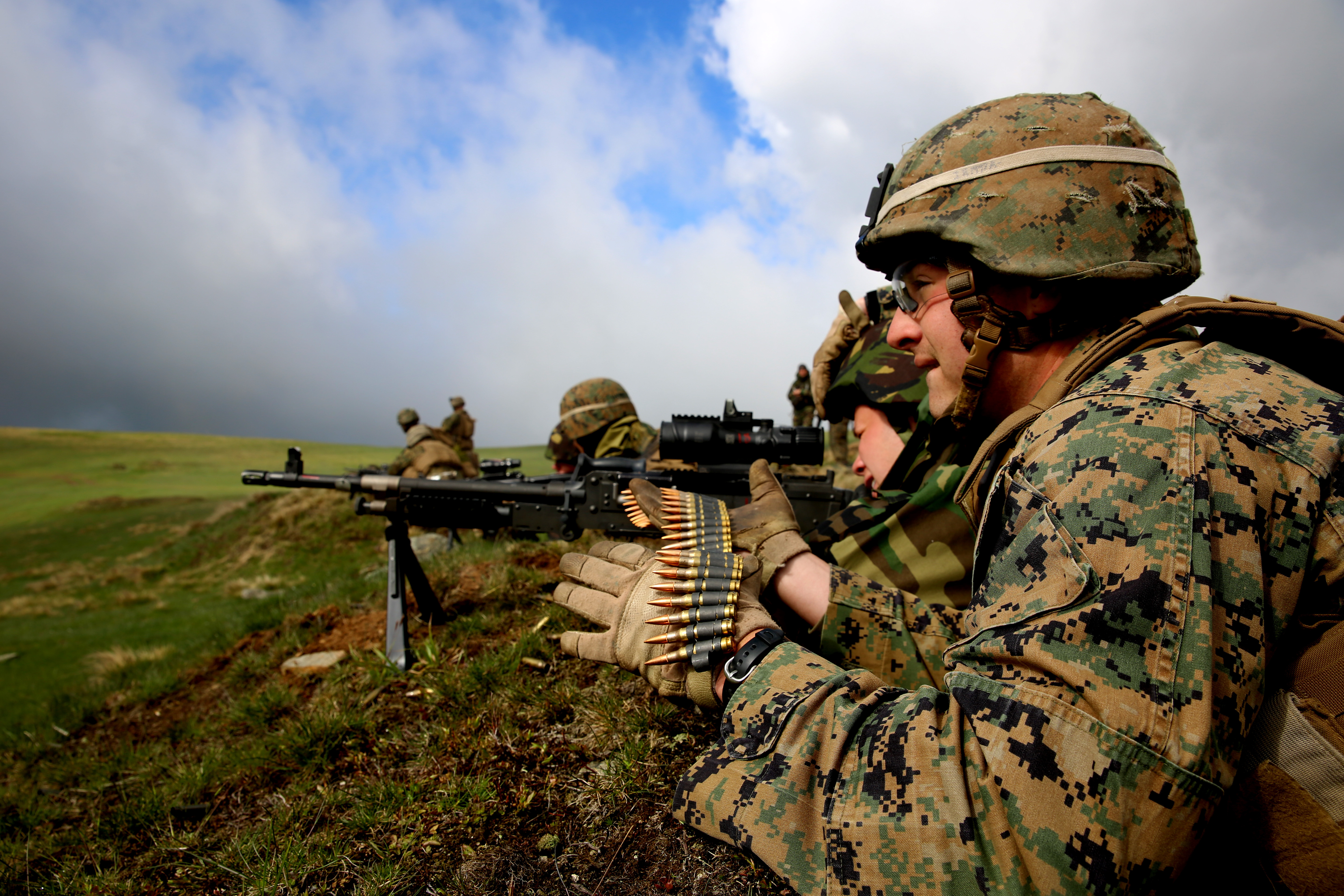
A soldier with the 17th Mountain Troops Battalion fires an M240B machine gun with a U.S. Marine of the Black Sea Rotational Force, 2014

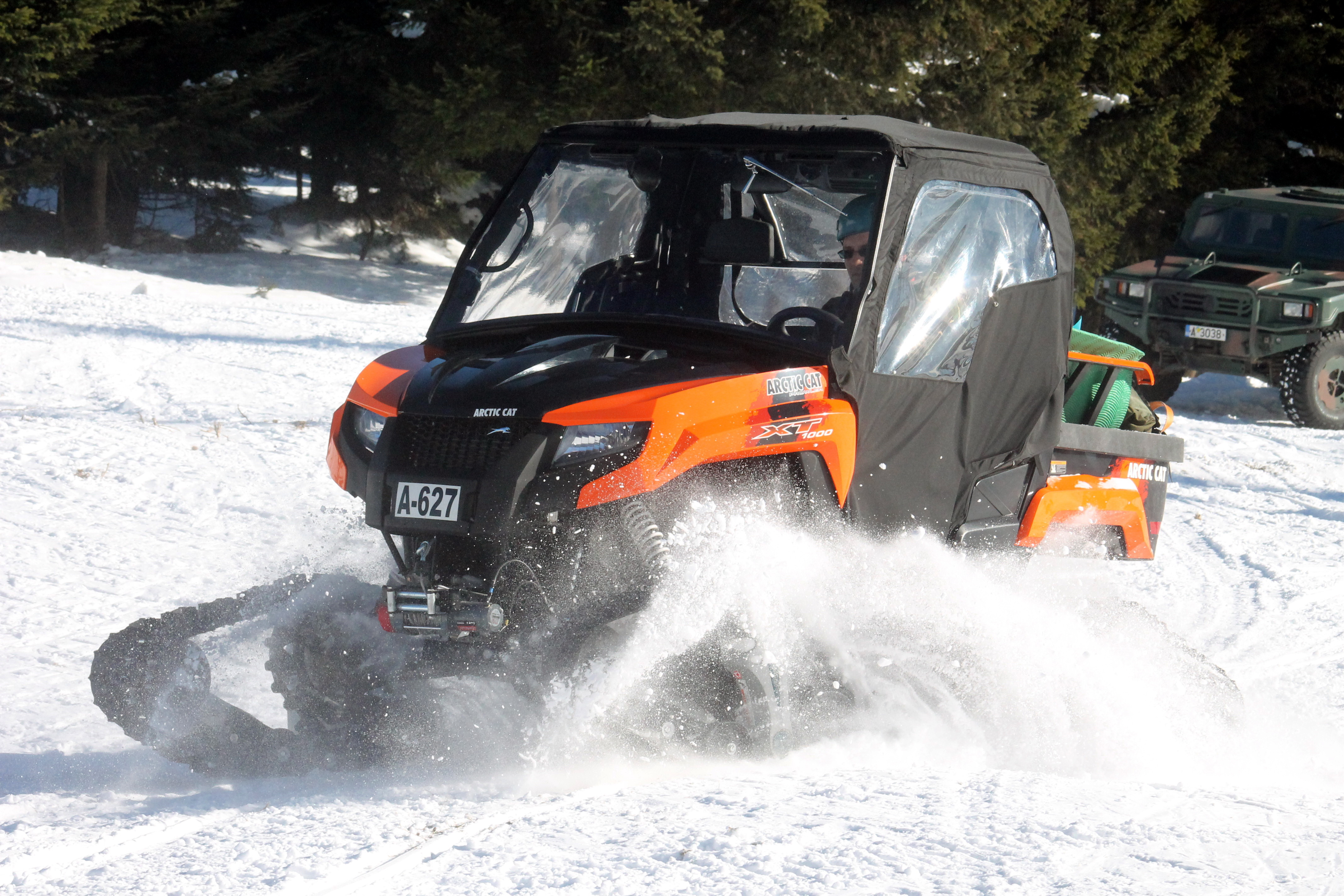
An Arctic Cat Prowler used by the 21st Mountain Hunters Battalion during a training exercise, 2017

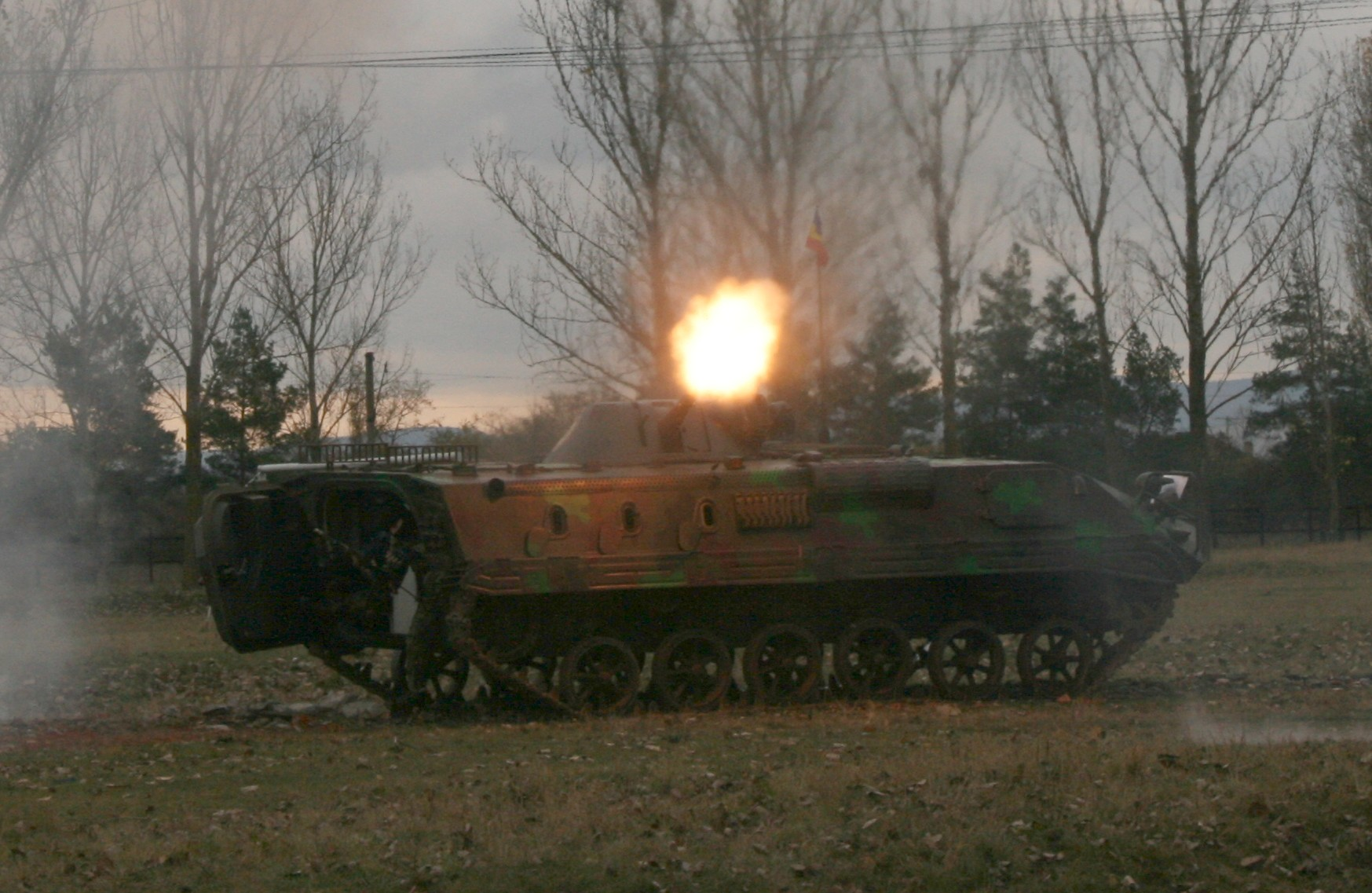
An MLVM armoured personnel carrier firing during a military demonstration

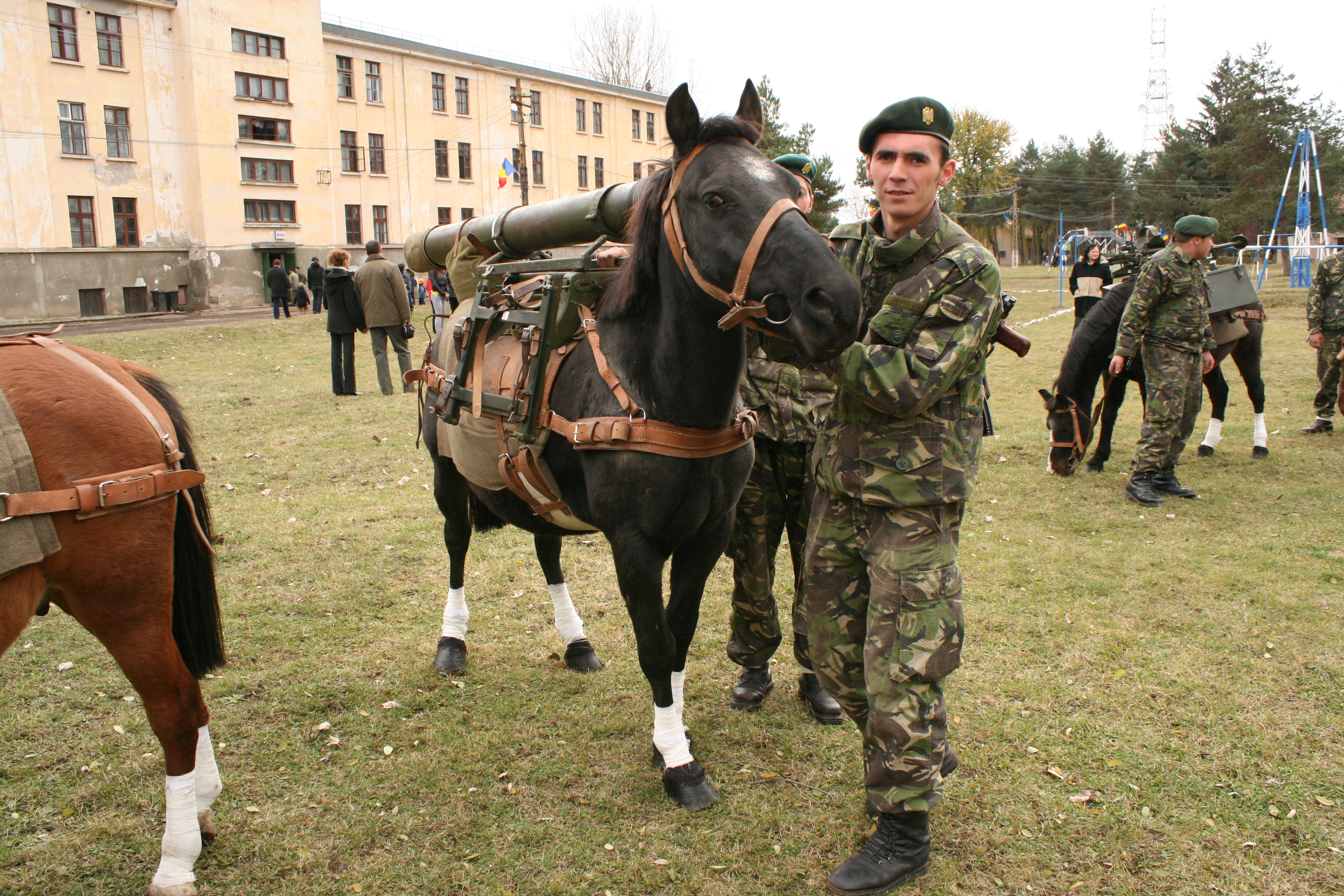
Soldiers of the 22nd Mountain Troops Battalion with Huțul ponies

== See also ==
- List of mountain warfare forces
- Mountain warfare
- Ski warfare
- French Chasseurs Alpins
- German Gebirgsjäger
- Italian Alpini
- Polish Podhale rifles
- 10th Mountain Division (United States)

== Bibliography ==
- Suman, Gheorghe (2014). "Vânătorii de munte | Primul război mondial". Tactică și Strategie (in Romanian). Baia Mare: Editura Marist. ISSN 2360-0039.
