= Battle of the Sea of Azov =

World War II battle in 1941

- Part of the Eastern Front of World War II
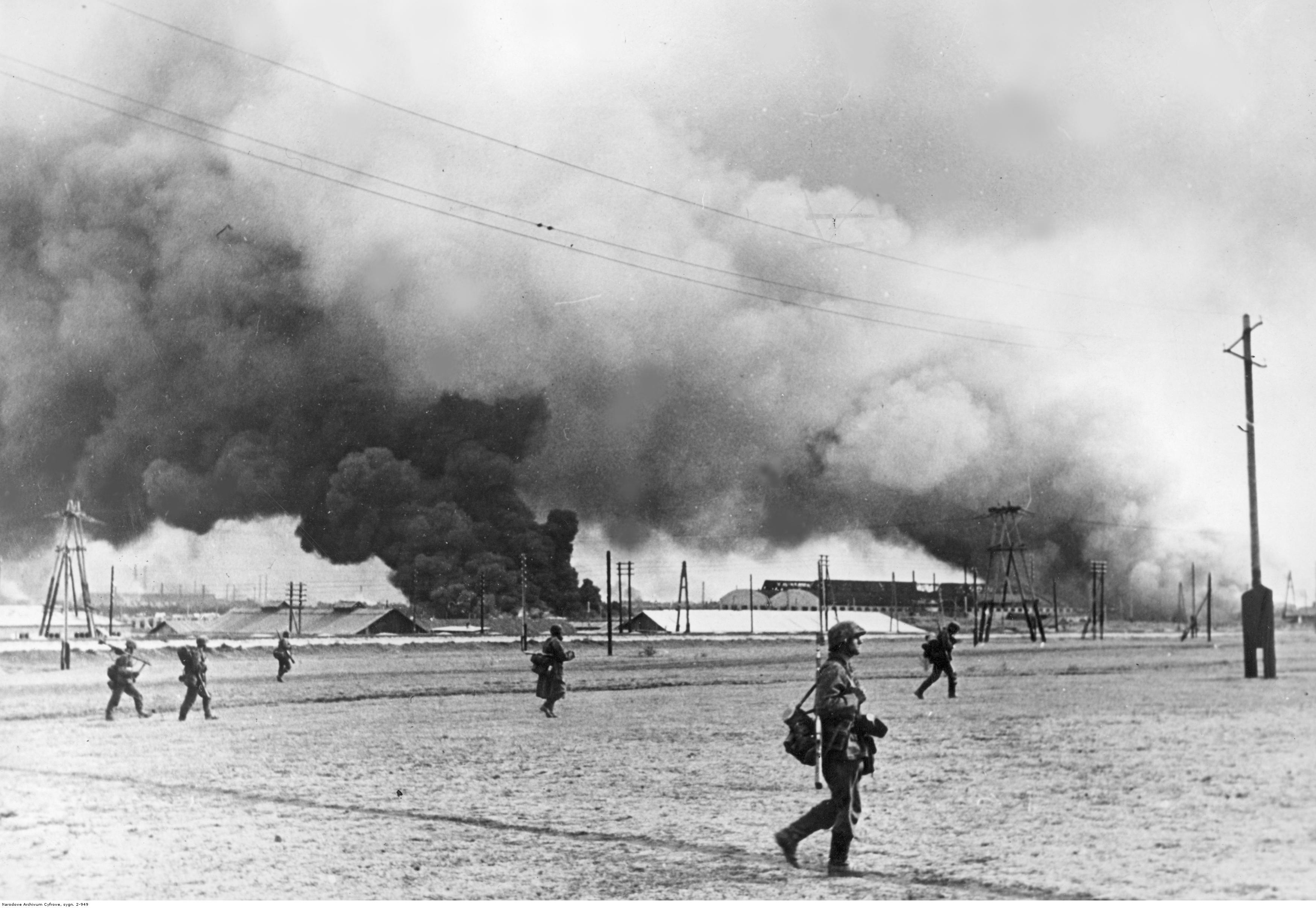
- Members of Leibstandarte SS Adolf Hitler enter Taganrog, October 1941
Date	26 September 1941 – 11 October 1941 (2 weeks and 1 day)
Location	Northern shore of the Sea of Azov
Result	Axis victory: Encirclement & destruction of Soviet 9th & 18th Armies; German forces advance on Crimea, Kharkov, and Rostov

Belligerents
Germany; Romania	Soviet Union

Commanders and leaders
(Nazi Germany) Gerd von Rundstedt (Nazi Germany) Erich von Manstein (Nazi Germany) Ewald von Kleist (Kingdom of Romania) Petre Dumitrescu	(Soviet Union) Semyon Timoshenko (Soviet Union) Dmitry Ryabyshev (Soviet Union) Yakov Cherevichenko

Units involved
(Nazi Germany) Army Group South: (Nazi Germany) 11th Army; (Nazi Germany) 1st Panzer Group; (Kingdom of Romania) 3rd Army	(Soviet Union) Southern Front: (Soviet Union) 9th Army; (Soviet Union) 18th Army

Strength
Unknown	Unknown

Casualties and losses
2,456 killed 9,699 wounded 266 missing Total: 12,421 (21 September–10 October)	106,332 captured 212 tanks destroyed or captured 772 guns captured

The Battle of the Sea of Azov, also known as the Chernigovka pocket, was an Axis military campaign fought between 26 September 1941 and 11 October 1941 on the northern shores of the Sea of Azov on the Eastern Front of World War II during Operation Barbarossa. It resulted in a complete Axis victory over the Red Army.

After destroying five Soviet armies at Kiev in late September 1941, the German Army Group South advanced east and south to capture the industrial Donbas region and the Crimea. Within days of the battle of Kiev's conclusion, the Soviet Southern Front launched an attack on 26 September with two armies on the northern shores of the Sea of Azov against elements of the German 11th Army, which was simultaneously advancing into the Crimea. After initially pushing back the Romanian 3rd Army, which fought under German command, the Soviet advance ground to a halt when the Leibstandarte SS Adolf Hitler Brigade (LSSAH) arrived to reinforce their Axis allies. On 1 October the 1st Panzer Group under Ewald von Kleist swept south to isolate the two Soviet armies. The offensive caught the Red Army completely by surprise, forcing them to retreat on 3 October to avoid encirclement.

The Germans now attacked from the west, north, and east, isolating the Soviets on 7 October after capturing Melitopol and Berdiansk. The Soviet 9th and 18th Armies were cut off and destroyed in four days. The Soviet defeat was total; 106,332 men captured, 212 tanks destroyed or captured in the pocket alone as well as 766 artillery pieces of all types. All units of the German 11th Army and the 1st Panzer Group lost 12,421 men combined from 21 September to 10 October; actual German losses in the battle were lower as only parts of both armies fought in the battle.

The death or capture of two-thirds of all Southern Front troops in four days unhinged the Front's left flank, allowing the Germans to capture Kharkov on 24 October. Kleist's 1st Panzer Army took the Donbas region that same month, while Von Manstein's 11th Army was freed to conquer Crimea with its full strength from 18 October onward.

== The battle ==
After concluding the Battle of Kiev in September 1941, the German Army Group South advanced from the Dnieper to the Sea of Azov coast. The city of Rostov was assigned as the objective for the 11th Army now commanded by General Eugen Ritter von Schobert, however he died in a crash the same day due to landing his liaison Fieseler Storch aircraft in a minefield. To replace him, General of Infantry Erich von Manstein was ordered to travel from the Leningrad sector of the front to the extreme southern sector. He would also receive support from the 4th Luftwaffe Air Fleet.

At this time the LIV Army Corps of the 11th Army were still engaged in the Crimea, and because the Romanian forces were still engaged in the Siege of Odessa, the Army's resources for the Rostov objective were severely limited, even though Red Army troops were in retreat. For this reason, von Manstein initially replaced the LIV Corps with the smaller XXX Army Corps and XLIX Mountain Corps and ordered the LIV Corps into the first echelon in the advance to Rostov.

Late in September the 3rd Romanian Army, under the command of Lieutenant General Petre Dumitrescu, joined the 11th Army in the advance towards Rostov, but were severely depleted by the attacks of the Soviet 9th and 18th Armies on 26 September. This forced a halt to the Army's advance to safeguard its flank and obliged Von Manstein to use his only mobile reserve unit, the Leibstandarte Brigade, to shore up Romanian defences.

After the LSSAH had stabilized the Romanian sector, the Soviets increased the pressure on XXX Army Corps. The Soviets did not respond to the build-up of the 1st Panzer Group on their northern flank. On 1 October the Germans started their counterattack from the north and west. The rapid advance of German armoured and motorized forces from the north compelled the Soviets to retreat on October 3. The 11th Army took up the pursuit, with the Leibstandarte's attack eliminating the Soviet 30th Rifle Division's HQ section and dispersing its subordinate formations. Melitopol was captured by III Panzer Corps on 5 October. The LSSAH reconnaissance battalion under Kurt Meyer captured Berdiansk on 6 October. The XIV motorized Army Corps under Gustav Anton von Wietersheim linked up with the Leibstandarte to encircle seven Red Army divisions in the Mariupol-Berdiansk area on October 7. Four days later the battle was over. Caught in the pocket, 150,000 troops of the 9th and 18th Army were killed or captured. The Germans took more than 106,332 prisoners, both in the pocket and during the pursuit, along with 212 tanks and 772 guns of all types. Smirnov, the 18th Army commander, was killed in action and buried with full military honours by the Germans.

== Aftermath ==
=== First battle of Rostov ===
The assault on Rostov began on 17 November, and on 21 November the Germans took Rostov. However, the German lines were over-extended, and von Kleist's warnings that his left flank was vulnerable and that his tanks were ineffective in the freezing weather were ignored. On 27 November the Soviet 37th Army, commanded by Lieutenant-General Anton Ivanovich Lopatin, as part of the Rostov Strategic Offensive Operation (17 November 1941 – 2 December 1941), counter-attacked the 1st Panzer Group's spearhead from the north, forcing them to pull out of the city. Adolf Hitler countermanded the retreat. When von Rundstedt refused to obey, Hitler sacked him, and replaced him with von Reichenau. However, von Reichenau saw at once that von Rundstedt was right and succeeded in persuading Hitler, via Franz Halder, to authorise the withdrawal, and the 1st Panzer Army was forced back to the Mius River at Taganrog. It was the first significant German withdrawal of the war.

=== Renewed offensive ===
The offensive along the Azov coast was resumed in the summer of 1942, during Fall Blau. With air support from the Ju 87s of Sturzkampfgeschwader 77, Wilhelm List's Army Group A recaptured Rostov, the "gate to the Caucasus", on 23 July 1942 relatively easily.

Further South along the coast, the remaining small ports and coastal areas still in Soviet hands were captured by Romanian Cavalry. Yeysk fell to the Romanians on 8 August. The campaign came to an end on 23 August, when the Romanians captured the port of Temryuk after bitter house-to-house fighting against Soviet naval infantry. As Romanian troops entered the last Soviet-held Azov port, the main warships of the Soviet Azov Flotilla were scuttled to avoid capture: gunboats Bug, Don and Dniester (each of 840 tons and armed with two 130 mm guns).

With the Sea of Azov secured, the Axis proceeded to launch a massive amphibious operation (Fall Blücher) in a bid to wipe out Soviet resistance on the Taman Peninsula and open the sea route to the Crimea.
