= List of generals of the Romanian Armed Forces =

This article provides a list of general officers and marshals of the Romanian Armed Forces, along with an overview of their service, major battles and awards, and other select biographical details. A general officer, or general, is an officer of high rank in an army. The Romanian Armed Forces have four ranks of general officer, in ascending order of rank: Brigadier General, Major General, Lieutenant General, General.

In cases of exceptional military service, the President of Romania may award a general the rank of Mareșal, or Marshal of Romania, the highest military rank in the Romanian Armed Forces.

== Marshals of Romania ==
Image	Name	Rank	Service record	Notes
	Ion Antonescu (1882–1946)	Marshal of Romania	1904 – enlisted; Served during; Second Balkan War; World War I; World War II; 1944 – ousted	Nickname – Câinele Roșu ("Red Dog"); Served as 43rd Prime Minister of Romania; Executed in 1946 for treason; Major awards: Order of Michael the Brave; Knight's Cross of the Iron Cross
	Alexandru Averescu (1858–1938)	Marshal of Romania	1876 – enlisted; Served during; War of Independence; Second Balkan War; World War I; 1918 – promoted to Prime Minister	Served as 24th Prime Minister of Romania; Major battles: Battle of Turtucaia; Flămânda Offensive; Battle of Mărăști; Battle of Mărășești; Major awards and honors: Honorary member of the Romanian Academy; Order of Michael the Brave
	Michael I of Romania (1921–2017)	Marshal of Romania	1941 – honorary title awarded by Ion Antonescu	King of Romania from 20 July 1927 to 8 June 1930, and 6 September 1940 to 30 December 1947
	Constantin Prezan (1861–1943)	Marshal of Romania	1883 – enlisted; Served during: World War I; Hungarian–Romanian War; 1920 – placed in reserve	Appointed Marshal of Romania in 1930 in recognition of service; Major awards: Honorary member of the Romanian Academy; Order of Michael the Brave

== Generals ==
Image	Name	Rank	Service record	Notes
	Aurel Aldea (1887–1949)	Lieutenant General	Served during: Second Balkan War; World War I; World War II; 1941 – retired; 1944 – recalled; 1945 – retired, second time	Coordinated a "National Resistance Movement" in opposition to the communist regime; Died in detention at Aiud Prison
	Paul Alexiu (1893–1963)	Major General	Served during: World War II; 1950 – retired	
	Barbu Alinescu (1890–1952)	Brigadier General	Served during: World War II; 1942 – retired	
	Anghel Andreescu (1950 – )	General		Member of the Romanian Academy of Scientists, Military Department
	Constantin Anton (1894–1993)	Brigadier General	Served during: World War II; 1947 – retired	Served with the Romanian Gendamerie
	Ilie Antonescu (1894–1974)	Major General	Served during: World War II; 1945 – in reserve; 1948 – retired	
	Petre Antonescu (1891–1957)	Brigadier General	Served during: World War II; 1945 – in reserve; 1948 – retired	
	Ioan Arbore (1892–1954)	Major General	Served during: World War I; World War II; 1945 – retired	Major battles: Battle of Stalingrad; Arrested in 1946 and imprisoned in 1948 as a traitor; Died in prison in 1954
	Gheorghe Argeșanu (1883–1940)	General (posthumous)	Served during: World War I; World War II; 1940 – arrested	Served as 40th Prime Minister of Romania; Killed during the Jilava prison massacre of 1940; Posthumously promoted to General in 1945
	Ioan Arhip (1890–1980)	Major General	Served during: World War II; 1945 – retired	
	Constantin Atanasescu (1885–1949)	General	Served during: World War II; 1940 – retired	Retired as a lieutenant general but promoted to general while still on reserve in 1947
	Vasile Atanasiu (1886–1964)	General	Served during: World War I; World War II; 1948 – retired	Major awards: Order of Michael the Brave; Order of the White Lion; Order of Suvorov
	Gheorghe Avramescu (1888–1945)	General	Served during: Second Balkan War; World War I; World War II; 1945 – arrested	Killed by German airstrike while in Soviet custody; Major awards: German Cross in Gold; Order of Michael the Brave, 2nd class
	Constantion Bădescu (1892–1962)	Brigadier General	Served during: World War II; 1947 – retired	
	Gheorghe Băgulescu (1886–1963)	Brigadier General	Served during: World War I; World War II; 1940 – retired	Served with a vânători de munte unit in World War I; Served as ambassador and military attaché to Tokyo from 1934 to 1939; Ambassador and military attaché to Tokyo & Nanking-China from 1941 to 1943; Major awards: Order of Michael the Brave, 3rd class; Order of the Sacred Treasure, 3rd class
	Ștefan Balaban (1890–1962)	Brigadier General	Served during: World War II; 1947 – reserve	
	Grigore Bălan (1896–1944)	Brigadier General	Served during: World War II; 1944 – killed in action	
	Radu Băldescu (1888–1953)	Major General	Served during: World War II; 1947 – retired	
	Ștefan Bardan (1892 – unknown)	Major General	Served during: World War II; 1947 – retired	
	Emanoil Bârzotescu (1888–1968)	Major General	Served during: World War II; 1947 – retired	Arrested in 1950; Released in 1953
	Alexandru Batcu (1892–1964)	Brigadier General	Served during: World War II; 1948 – retired	
	Ioan Beldiceanu (1892–1982)	Major General	Served during: World War II; 1947 – retired	
	George Bengescu-Dabija (1844–1916)	General	1859 – enlisted	Also a poet and playwright; Served as Senator for Fălciu County; Member of Junimea literary society
	Ioan Bengliu (1881–1940)	Lieutenant General	Served during: World War II; 1940 – retired	Served with the Romanian Gendarmerie
	Anton Berindei (1838–1899)	Division General		Served as War Minister in the cabinet of Petre S. Aurelian from 1896 to 1899.
	Emil Bodnăraș (1904–1976)	General		Served as a Soviet agent from 1931 to 1935; Participated in the 1944 coup led by King Michael against the government of Ion Antonescu; Minister of War, 1947–1955
	Ion Boițeanu (1885–1946)	Lieutenant General	Served during: World War II; 1945 – retired	
	Constantin Brătescu (1892–1971)	Major General	Served during: World War II; 1943–1948 – Soviet prisoner of war; 1948 – retired	Served as a liaison officer to the German military; Major battles: Operation Barbarossa; Operation Blue; Battle of Stalingrad.
	Ernest Broșteanu (1869–1932)	Division General	Served during: Second Balkan War; World War I; 1930 – retired	Major battles: Battle of Mărășești; Major awards: Order of Michael the Brave, 3rd class
	Constantin Budișteanu (1838–1911)	Division General	Served during: Romanian War of Independence; 1897 – retired	Served as Senate President after military career; Major battles: Siege of Plevna; Major awards: Military Virtue Medal; Order of the Star of Romania; Danube Crossing Cross
	Ștefan Burileanu (1874–1944)	Division General	Served during: World War I	Inventor of the Burileanu 57mm anti-aircraft artillery; Member of the Romanian Academy of Sciences
	Corneliu Calotescu (1889–1970)	Major General	Served during: World War I; World War II; 1945 – retired	
	Mihail Cămărașu (1891–1962)	Lieutenant General	Served during: World War II; 1948 – retired	
	Nicolae Cambrea (1899–1976)	Major General	Served during: World War II; 1942–1943 – Soviet prisoner of war; 1950 – retired	Served with the Tudor Vladimirescu Division after release from Soviet captivity
	Petre Cameniță (1889–1962)	Major General	Served during: World War II; 1945 – retired	
	Alexandru Candiano-Popescu (1841–1901)	General of Cavalry	Served during: Romanian War of Independence	Participated in the Republic of Ploiești revolt of 1870
	Sava Caracaș (1890–1945)	Brigadier General	Served during: World War II; 1945 – died in military hospital	
	Dumitru Carlaonț (1888–1970)	Major General	Served during: World War II; 1945 – retired	Arrested and released by the Communist government three times between 1948 and 1960
	Ioan Carlaonț (1885–1952)	Major General	Served during: World War I; World War II; 1940 – retired	Led the "National Resistance Movement" in Oltenia, in opposition to the communist regime; Died in detention at Aiud Prison
	Corneliu Carp (1895–1982)	Brigadier General	Served during: World War II; 1947 – retired	
	Gheorghe Catrina (1953 – )	General		Served as the Chief of the Romanian Air Force Staff from 2003 to 2007
	Ilie Ceaușescu (1926–2002)	Lieutenant General		Brother of Romanian president Nicolae Ceaușescu; Served as Deputy Minister of Defense from 1982 to 1989
	Marin Ceaușu (1891–1954)	Brigadier General	Served during: World War II; 1947 – retired	
	Alexandru Cernat (1828–1893)	General	1851– enlisted; Served during: Romanian War of Independence; 1891 – retired	Served as Minister of War in 1878
	Mircea Chelaru (1949 – )	Lieutenant General		Last leader of the Romanian National Unity Party
	Mihai Chițac (1928–2010)	Lieutenant General		Served as Minister of the Interior between 1989 and 1990; Convicted of aggravated manslaughter in 2008 for the shooting deaths of pro-democracy protesters
	Platon Chirnoagă (1894–1974)	Brigadier General	Served during: World War II; 1945 – American prisoner of war; 1947 – left Romania	
	Vasile Chițu (1896–1968)	Brigadier General	Served during: World War II; 1944 – retired	
	Gheorghe Cialâk (1886–1977)	Lieutenant General	Served during: World War II; 1945 – retired	
	Henri Cihoski (1871–1950)	Division General	Served during: Second Balkan War; World War I	Major awards: Cross of Sanitary Merit; Order of the Star of Romania; Order of Michael the Brave; Order of the Crown of Romania; Order of St. George
	Nicolae Ciupercă (1882–1950)	General	Served during: World War I; World War II; 1941 – retired	Served as Minister of Defense between 1938 and 1939
	Tudorancea Ciurea (1888–1971)	Brigadier General	Served during: World War II; 1944 – retired	
	Constantin Coandă (1857–1932)	General	Served during: Romanian War of Independence	Served as the 26th Prime Minister of Romania; Injured in a 1920 bombing by anarchist Max Goldstein
	Traian Cocorăscu (1888–1970)	Brigadier General	Served during: World War II; 1942 – retired	
	Ion Codreanu (1891–1960)	Brigadier General	Served during: World War II; 1947 – retired	
	Dumitru Coliu (1907–1979)	General		
	Simion Coman (1890–1971)	Brigadier General	Served during: World War II; 1947 – retired	
	Nicolae M. Condiescu (1880–1939)	Brigadier General	Served during: Second Balkan War; World War I; 1926 – reserve status	Also a novelist after his military career ended
	Constantin S. Constantin (1889–1948)	Major General	Served during: World War II; 1945 – retired	
	Constantin Constantinescu-Claps (1889–1948)	Major General	Served during: World War II; 1943 – retired	
	Ion Constantinescu (1896 – unknown)	Brigadier General	Served during: World War II; 1947 – retired	
	Tancred Constantinescu (1876–1951)	General	Served during: World War II	Served as Minister of Industry between 1923 and 1926; Major battles: Operation Barbarossa
	Vladimir Constantinescu (1895–1965)	Brigadier General	Served during: World War II; 1947 – retired	
	Constantin Constantiniu (1894–1971)	Brigadier General	Served during: World War II; 1952 – retired	
	Mihail Corbuleanu (1894–1973)	Major General	Served during: World War II; 1947 – retired	
	Dumitru Coroamă (1885–1956)	Major General	Served during: World War II; 1944 – arrested	
	Gheorghe Cosma (1892–1969)	Major General	Served during: World War II; 1947 – retired	
	Nicolae Costescu (1888–1963)	Major General	Served during: World War II; 1942 – retired	
	Grigore C. Crăiniceanu (1852–1935)	Division General	Served during: World War I	Served as War Minister from 1909 to 1910
	Ilie Crețulescu (1892–1971)	Major General	Served during: World War II; 1948 – retired	
	Constantin Cristescu (1866–1923)	General	Served during: World War I	
	Constantin Croitoru (1952 – )	Lieutenant General		Served as the Chief of the Romanian Air Force Staff from 2007 to 2009
	Ioan Culcer (1853–1928)	General	Served during: Romanian War of Independence; Second Balkan War; World War I; 1916 – relieved of command	Served as Governor of the Southern Dobruja; Served as Minister of Public Works in 1918
	Dumitru Dămăceanu (1896–1978)	Brigadier General	Served during: World War II; 1949 – retired	Major participant in King Michael's Coup of 1944
	Dorin Dănilă (1953 – )	Vice Admiral		Served as the Chief of the Romanian Naval Forces Staff from 2006 to 2010
	Nicolae Dăscălescu (1884–1969)	Lieutenant General	Served during: World War I; Hungarian–Romanian War; World War II; 1945 – retired	Commander of the 2nd Corps (1942–1945); Commander of the 4th Army (March–June 1945)
	Ion Dincă (1928–2007)	General		Served as Mayor of Bucharest
	Constantin Doncea (1904–1973)	Major General		Fought with the International Brigades in the Spanish Civil War
	Corneliu Dragalina (1887–1949)	Lieutenant General	Served during: World War II; 1945 – retired	Major awards: Order of Michael the Brave; Knight's Cross of the Iron Cross; Iron Cross
	Ion Dragalina (1860–1916)	Division General	Served during: World War I	Major battles: Battle of Orșova
	Alexandru Drăghici (1913–1993)	Major General		Served as Interior Minister and State Security Minister
	Ioan Dumitrache (1889–1977)	Lieutenant General	Served during: World War II; 1947 – retired	Major awards: Order of Michael the Brave; Knight's Cross of the Iron Cross; Iron Cross
	Petre Dumitrescu (1882–1950)	General	Served during: World War II; 1944 – retired	Major awards: Order of Michael the Brave; Knight's Cross of the Iron Cross with Oak Leaves; Iron Cross
	Ștefan Fălcoianu (1835–1905)	Division General	1856 – enlisted; 1872 – placed in reserve	Author of several books on military theory and history; Major awards: Order of Osmanieh; Order of the Star of Romania; Order of the Crown of Romania
	Ion Emanuel Florescu (1819–1893)	General		Served as the 13th Prime Minister of Romania
	Teodor Frunzeti (1955 – )	Lieutenant General		Served as chief of the Romanian Land Forces Staff from 2006 to 2009; Author of several books and articles on military activity
	Ermil Gheorghiu (1896–1977)	Major General	Served during: World War II; 1947 – arrested	Commander of the Romanian Air Force during World War II; Major awards: Knight's Cross of the Iron Cross
	Dan Ghica-Radu (1955 – )	Lieutenant General		Served as chief of the Romanian Land Forces Staff from 2009 to 2011
	Eremia Grigorescu (1863–1919)	General	Served during: World War I	Major battles: Battle of Mărășești; Major awards and honors: Order of Michael the Brave; Awarded a sword by Emperor Yoshihito of Japan
	Ștefan Gușă (1940–1994)	Major General		Served as Chief of the General Staff of the Romanian Armed Forces from 1986 to 1989
	Nicolae Haralambie (1835–1908)	Brigadier General	Served during: Romanian War of Independence	Participated in the dethronement of Prince Alexandru Ioan Cuza in 1866; Served as War Minister between 1866 and 1867
	Emanoil Ionescu (1887–1949)	Lieutenant General	Served during: World War II; 1948 – retired	Commander of the Romanian Air Force 1st Air Corps; Major awards: Iron Cross; Knight's Cross of the Iron Cross; Order of Suvorov
	Radu Korne (1895–1949)	Brigadier General	Served during: World War II; 1945 – retired	Major awards: Order of Michael the Brave; Iron Cross; Knight's Cross of the Iron Cross
	Iacob Lahovary (1846–1907)	Brigadier General		Served as Minister of War and Minister of Foreign Affairs
	Mihail Lascăr (1889–1959)	General	Served during: Second Balkan War; World War I; World War II; 1950 – retired	Major battles: Operation Barbarossa; Crimean Campaign (1941); Battle of Stalingrad; Major awards: Order of Michael the Brave; Iron Cross; Knight's Cross with Oak Leaves
	Horia Macellariu (1894–1989)	Counter Admiral	Served during; World War II	Served as the commander of the Royal Romanian Navy during World War II
	Gheorghe Magheru (1802–1880)	General	Served during: Russo-Turkish War (1828–1829); 1947 – retired	Major awards: Gold Sword for Bravery; Order of Saint Anna
	Gheorghe Manoliu (1888–1980)	Major General	Served during: World War II; 1945 – retired	Major awards: Knight's Cross of the Iron Cross
	Gheorghe Manu (1833–1911)	General	Served during: Romanian War of Independence	Major awards: Military Virtue Medal
	Gheorghe Mihail (1887–1982)	General	Served during: Second Balkan War; World War I; World War II; 1947 – retired	Major awards: Order of Michael the Brave
	Vasile Milea (1927–1989)	General		Served as Chief of the Romanian General Staff between 1980 and 1985
	Nicolae Militaru (1925–1996)	General		Served as Defence Minister from 1989 to 1990
	Leonard Mociulschi (1889–1979)	Major General	Served during: Second Balkan War; World War I; World War II; 1947 – retired	Major awards: Order of Michael the Brave; Iron Cross; Knight's Cross of the Iron Cross
	Traian Moșoiu (1868–1932)	General	Served during: World War I; Hungarian–Romanian War	
	Ilie Năstase (1946 – )	Major General		Best known as a former ATP no. 1 ranked tennis player; Rank granted by presidential decree in December 2008
	Serghei Nicolau (1905–1999)	Lieutenant General		Led the military espionage bureau of the Romanian General Staff
	Constantin Nicolescu (1887–1972)	Lieutenant General	Served during: Second Balkan War; World War I; World War II; 1948 – retired	Major awards: Order of Michael the Brave; Legion of Honour
	Alexandru Nicolschi (1915–1992)	Lieutenant General		Served with the Romanian Securitate
	Neculai Onțanu (1949 – )	Major General		Served as mayor of Bucharest's Sector 2
	Gabriel Oprea (1961 – )	General		Served as Minister of National Defense between 2009 and 2012; Served as Minister of Internal Affairs between 2014 and 2015
	Ion Mihai Pacepa (1928–2021)	Lieutenant General		Served with the Romanian Securitate; Defected to the United States in 1978; Worked with the CIA subsequent to defection
	Nicolae Păiș (1887–1952)	Vice Admiral	Served during: World War II	Served as the Minister of Air and Marine Forces in 1940
	Gheorghe Pănculescu (1903–2007)	General	Served during: World War I; World War II	Was the final surviving Romanian World War I veteran at his death in 2007
	Constantin Petrovicescu (1883–1949)	Division General		
	Artur Phleps (1881–1944)	Major General	Served during: World War I; Hungarian-Romanian War of 1919; World War II	Also served with the Waffen-SS and the Austro-Hungarian Army; Major awards: Knight's Cross of the Iron Cross with Oak Leaves; German Cross in Gold
	Gheorghe Pintilie (1902–1985)	Lieutenant General		Served as the first Director of the Romanian Securitate
	Nicolae Pleșiță (1929–2009)	Major General		Led the Foreign Intelligence Service of the Securitate from 1980 to 1984
	David Popescu (1886–1955)	Brigadier General	Served during: World War II; 1941 – retired	
	Ioan Popovici (1857–1956)	Divisional General	Served during: World War I; 1916 – retired	* Nicknamed Provincialul ("the Provincial") due to ineptitude
	Ioan Popovici (1865–1953)	Brigadier General	Served during: World War I; 1948 – arrested; 1953 – died in prison	* Nicknamed Epure to distinguish him from another general also named Ioan Popivici
	Dumitru Prunariu (1952 – )	Lieutenant General		Best known as Romania's first cosmonaut; Major awards and honors: Order of the Star of Romania; Order of Aeronautical virtue; Asteroid 10707 Prunariu was named in his honor in 2017
	Ioan Mihail Racoviță (1889–1954)	General	Served during: World War II; 1947 – retired	Major awards: Order of Michael the Brave; Iron Cross; Knight's Cross of the Iron Cross
	Nicolae Rădescu (1874–1953)	General	Served during: World War I; World War II; 1945 – left Romania	Served as the 45th Prime Minister of Romania
	Edgar Rădulescu (1890–1977)	Brigadier General	Served during: World War II; 1945 – retired	Major awards: Knight's Cross of the Iron Cross; Iron Cross
	Aristide Razu (1868–1950)	Division General	Served during: World War I; 1928 – retired	Major battles: Battle of Bran-Câmpulung
	Valter Roman (1913–1983)	Major General		Served with the International Brigades in the Spanish Civil War; High-ranking member of the Romanian Communist Party
	Radu R. Rosetti (1877–1949)	Brigadier General	Served during: World War I; 1924 – retired	Author of several books and articles on military history
	Leontin Sălăjan (1913–1966)	General		Served as Chief of the Romanian General Staff between 1950 and 1954
	Constantin Sănătescu (1885–1947)	General	Served during: Second Balkan War; World War I; World War II; 1947 – retired	Served as the 44th Prime Minister of Romania
	Bartolomeu Constantin Săvoiu (1945 – )	General (reserves)		Grandmaster of the Romanian National Grand Lodge
	Costică Silion (1955 – )	General		Served as the General Inspector of the Romanian Gendarmerie from 2005 to 2009
	Ioan Sion (1890–1942)	Brigadier General (posthumous)	Served during: World War I	
	Ion-Aurel Stanciu (1955 – )	General		Served as the Chief of the Romanian Air Force Staff from 2009 to 2011
	Victor Stănculescu (1928–2016)	General		Served as Minister of National Defence between 1990 and 1991; Convicted of aggravated manslaughter in 2008 for the shooting deaths of pro-democracy protesters
	Ilie Șteflea (1888–1946)	Lieutenant General	Served during: World War I; World War II; 1945 – retired	Major awards: Order of the Crown of Romania; Order of the Star of Romania; Order of Michael the Brave; Iron Cross
	Ioan Talpeș (1944 – )	General		Served as head of the Romanian Foreign Intelligence Service from 1992 to 1997
	Nicolae Tătăranu (1890–1953)	Major General	Served during: World War II; 1945 – retired	Major awards: Knight's Cross of the Iron Cross
	Gheorghe Teleman (1838–1913)	General	Served during: Russo-Turkish War (1877–1878)	
	Corneliu Teodorini (1893–1976)	Brigadier General	Served during: World War II; 1945 – retired	Major awards: Iron Cross; Knight's Cross of the Iron Cross with Oak Leaves
	Corneliu Teodorini (1893–1951)	Brigadier General	Served during: World War II; 1940 – retired; 1941 – recalled; 1944 – retired	Served with the Romanian Gendarmerie
	Radu Timofte (1949–2009)	Brigadier General		Served as the head of the Romanian Intelligence Service from 2001 to 2006
	Artur Văitoianu (1864–1956)	General	Served during: World War I; World War II	Served as the 27th Prime Minister of Romania
	Ion Vincze (1910–1996)	Major General		
	Matei Vlădescu (1835–1901)	Division General	Served during: Romanian War of Independence	
