= General Antonescu =

General Antonescu may refer to:

- Ilie Antonescu (1894–1974), Romanian Armed Forces major general
- Ion Antonescu (1882–1946), Romanian Armed Forces general
- Petre Antonescu (general) (1891–1957), Romanian Armed Forces brigadier general
