= Gheorghe =

Gheorghe is a Romanian and Aromanian given name and surname. It is a variant of George, also a name in Romanian but with soft Gs. It may refer to:

== Given name ==
- Gheorghe Adamescu (1869–1942), Romanian literary historian and bibliographer
- Gheorghe Albu (1909–1974), Romanian footballer
- Gheorghe Alexandrescu
- Gheorghe Andriev (born 1968), Romanian sprint canoeist
- Gheorghe Apostol (1913–2010), Romanian politician, deputy Prime Minister of Romania and a former leader of the Communist Party
- Gheorghe Apostoleanu (1832–1895), Romanian politician
- Gheorghe Argeșanu (1883–1940), Romanian general
- Gheorghe Arsenescu (1907–1962), Romanian Army officer
- Gheorghe Asachi (1788–1869), Moldavian polymath
- Gheorghe Băgulescu (1886–1963), Romanian general
- Gheorghe Balș (1868–1934), Romanian engineer, architect and art historian
- Gheorghe Bănciulescu (1898–1935), Romanian aviator
- Gheorghe Banu (1889–1957), Romanian eugenicist and politician
- Gheorghe Barbu (born 1951), Romanian engineer, politician and mining engineer
- Gheorghe Benga (born 1944), Romanian academic
- Gheorghe Bengescu (1848–1921), Romanian diplomat
- Gheorghe Bibescu (1804–1873), Romanian prince
- Gheorghe Bogdan-Duică (1866–1934), Romanian literary historian and literary critic
- Gheorghe Brăescu (1871–1949), Romanian writer
- Gheorghe Brega (born 1951), Moldovan politician
- Gheorghe Briceag (1928–2008), Moldovan human rights activist
- Gheorghe Bucur (born 1980), Romanian footballer
- Gheorghe Buruiană, Moldovan politician
- Gheorghe Buzatu (1939–2013), Romanian historian and politician
- Gheorghe Buzdugan (1867–1929), Romanian judge
- Gheorghe Calciu-Dumitreasa (1925–2006), Romanian dissident
- Gheorghe Călugăreanu (1902–1976), Romanian mathematician
- Gheorghe Caranda (1884–1912), Romanian aviator
- Gheorghe Cardaș (1899–1984), Romanian literary historian
- Gheorghe Grigore Cantacuzino (1833–1913), Romanian politician
- Gheorghe Cartianu-Popescu (1907–1982), Romanian engineer
- Gheorghe Catrina (born 1953), Romanian general
- Gheorghe Cialâk (1886–1977), Romanian general
- Gheorghe Cipăianu (1878–1957), Romanian politician
- Gheorghe E. Cojocaru (born 1963), Moldovan historian
- Gheorghe Cosma (1892–1969), Romanian general
- Gheorghe Danielov (1948–2017), Romanian sprint canoeist
- Gheorghe Dănilă (1949–2021), Romanian actor
- Gheorghe Derussi (1870–1931), Romanian politician
- Gheorghe Dinică (1934–2009), Romanian actor and singer
- Gheorghe Duca (born 1952), Moldovan academic and politician
- Gheorghe Gheorghiu-Dej (1901–1965), Romanian politician
- Gheorghe Ghibănescu, Romanian historian
- Gheorghe Hagi (born 1965), Romanian professional football manager and former player
- Gheorghe A. Lăzăreanu-Lăzurică (1892–?), Romanian writer and businessman
- Gheorghe Macovei (1880–1969), Romanian geologist
- Gheorghe Manoliu (1888–1980), Romanian general
- Gheorghe Manu (1833–1911), Romanian politician and general
- Gheorghe Mărdărescu (1866–1938), Romanian general
- Gheorghe Gaston Marin (1918–2010), Romanian politician
- Gheorghe Gh. Mârzescu (1876–1926), Romanian politician
- Gheorghe Mihail (1887–1982), Romanian army officer
- Gheorghe Mureșan (born 1971), Romanian basketball player
- Gheorghe Păun (born 1950), Romanian computer scientist
- Gheorghe Pohrib, Romanian firefighter
- Gheorghe Pintilie (1902–1985), Intelligence agent and former Deputy Minister of Internal Affairs of Romania
- Gheorghe Plagino (1876–1949), Romanian sports shooter and politician
- Gheorghe Pop de Băsești (1835–1919), Imperial Austrian-born Romanian politician, philanthropist and patriot
- Gheorghe Popescu (footballer, born 1919) (1919–2001), Romanian footballer
- Gheorghe Popescu (footballer, born 1967), Romanian footballer
- Gheorghe Răscănescu (1900–1967), romanian soldier
- Gheorghe Constantin Roja (1786–1847), Aromanian doctor, philologist, and historian
- Gheorghe Șevcișin (1945–2025), Moldovan conductor
- Gheorghe Tătărescu (1886–1957), Romanian politician
- Gheorghe Vergil Șerbu (born 1949), Romanian politician and member of the European Parliament
- Gheorghe Bunea Stancu (born 1954), Romanian politician
- Gheorghe Ursu (1926–1985), Romanian writer
- Gheorghe Vitanidis (1929–1994), Romanian film director
- Gheorghe Vodă (1934–2007), Soviet and Moldovan writer
- Gheorghe Văleanu (1864–1948), Romanian major general and military commander
- Gheorghe Vrănceanu (1900–1979), Romanian topologist
- Gheorghe Zamfir (born 1941), Romanian pan flute musician

== Surname ==
- Cornel Gheorghe (born 1971), Romanian figure skater
- Costin Gheorghe (born 1989), Romanian footballer
- Elena Gheorghe (born 1985), Romanian singer
- Nicolae Gheorghe (1946–2013), Romanian human rights activist
- Tudor Gheorghe (born 1945), Romanian singer
- Vasile Gheorghe (born 1985), Romanian professional football player
