= Chițu =

Chițu is a Romanian surname. Individuals with this name include:

- Aurelian Chițu (born 1991), footballer
- Andreea Chițu (born 1988), judoka
- Gheorghe Chițu (1828–1897), politician and writer
- Marian Chițu (born 1986), footballer
- Vasile Chițu (1896–1968), general in World War II

Chitu may refer to:

- Chitu, Ethiopia, administrative seat of Wonchi woreda
- Chitu, alternative spelling of Chi Tu, ancient Kingdom in the Malay Peninsula
- Chitu Khan, a Pindari Jat chief and general
- Haval Chitu, an automobile
