= Constantinesco =

Constantinesco may refer to:

- Constantinesco (automobile)
- Constantinescu, people with the surname Constantinesco or Constantinescu
