= Soviet occupation of Romania =

Period of Romania under the Soviet occupation

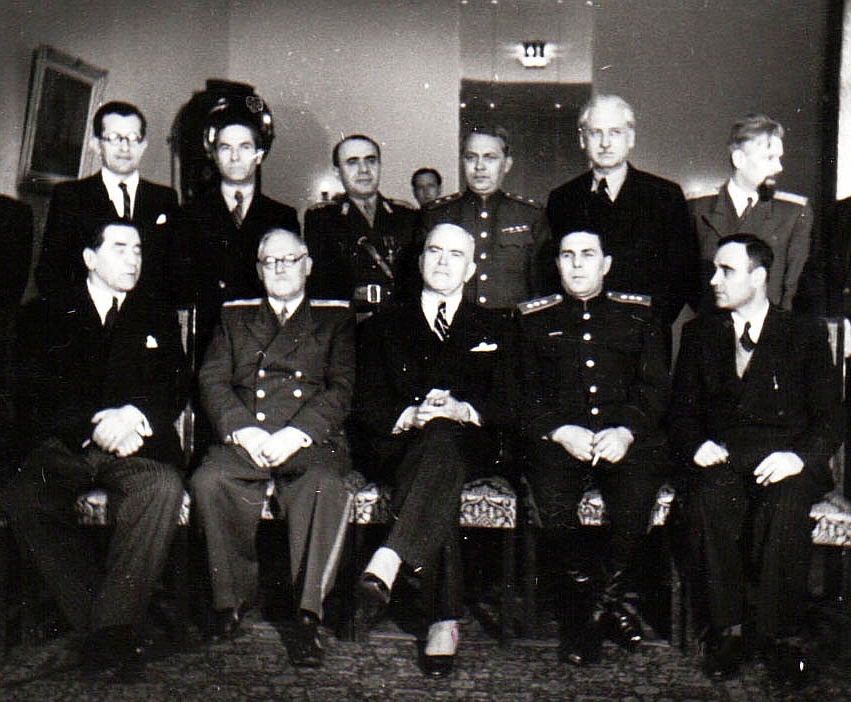
Gheorghe Gheorghiu-Dej, Petru Groza, and Gheorghe Tătărescu with Andrey Vyshinsky, Vladislav Vinogradov and Ivan Susaikov, at the Soviet legation în Bucharest, 11 March 1945

The Soviet occupation of Romania refers to the period from 1944 to August 1958, during which the Soviet Union maintained a significant military presence in Romania. The fate of the territories held by Romania after 1918 that were incorporated into the Soviet Union in 1940 is treated separately in the article on Soviet occupation of Bessarabia and Northern Bukovina.

During the Eastern Front offensive of 1944, the Soviet Army occupied the northwestern part of Moldavia as a result of armed combat that took place between the months of April and August of that year, while Romania was still an ally of Nazi Germany. The rest of the territory was occupied after Romania changed sides in World War II, as a result of the royal coup launched by King Michael I on August 23, 1944. On that date, the king announced that Romania had unilaterally ceased all military actions against the Allies, accepted the Allied armistice offer, and joined the war against the Axis powers. As no formal armistice offer had been extended yet, the Red Army occupied most of Romania as enemy territory prior to the signing of the Moscow Armistice of September 12, 1944.

The armistice convention and eventually the Paris Peace Treaties of 1947 provided a legal basis for the Soviet military presence in Romania, which lasted until 1958, reaching a peak of some 615,000 personnel in 1946.

The Soviets and the Romanian communists referred to the events of August 1944 as the "liberation of Romania by the glorious Soviet Army" in the 1952 Constitution of Romania, and August 23 (the day of 1944 coup) was celebrated as Liberation from Fascist Occupation Day. On the other hand, most Western and Romanian anti-communist sources use the term "Soviet occupation of Romania," some applying it to the whole period from 1944 to 1958.

== Background and beginning of the occupation ==
After having withdrawn its troops from Bessarabia and Northern Bukovina in response to the June 1940 Soviet Ultimatum, Romania entered an alliance with Nazi Germany and declared war on the Soviet Union. Romanian troops entered World War II in June 1941 as part of Operation Barbarossa, under the German High Command. Following the recapturing of the territory annexed by the Soviet Union in June 1940, Romanian troops occupied Southern Ukraine all the way to the Southern Bug. However, Romania's eastern campaign ended in disaster, notably at the Battle of Stalingrad.

By the end of 1943, the Red Army had regained control over most of the Soviet territory, and was advancing westward beyond the borders of USSR to defeat Nazi Germany and its allies. It was in this context that the Soviet forces crossed into Romania and occupied Northern and Eastern Moldavia.

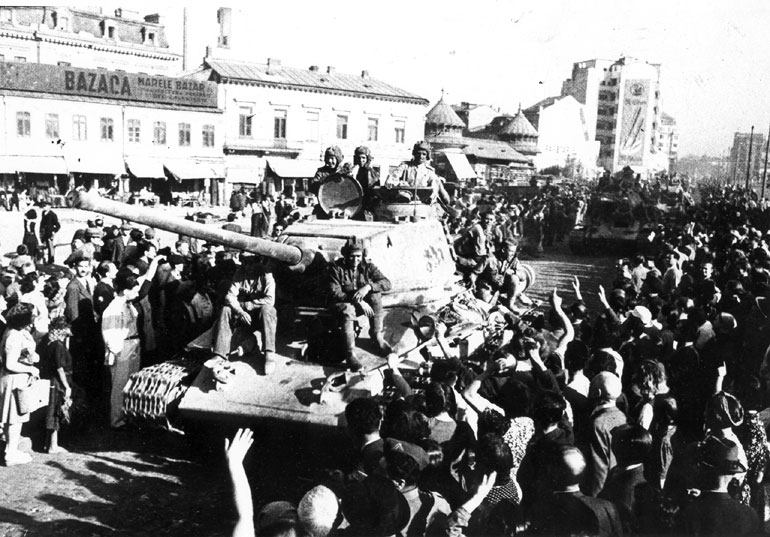
Troops of the 3rd Ukrainian Front entering Bucharest on August 31, 1944

On August 23, 1944, King Michael, supported by all major parties, launched a coup d'état, thereby overthrowing the pro-Nazi government of Ion Antonescu, and putting Romania's Army on the side of the Allies. As a result, King Michael was the last monarch behind the Iron Curtain to lose his throne, on December 30, 1947.

The coup facilitated the advance of the Red Army into Romania at an accelerated pace, and enabled the combined Romanian and Soviet armies to liberate the country from the German occupation. In the absence of an actual signed armistice, the Soviet troops continued to treat the Romanians as a hostile force. The armistice was signed three weeks later, on September 12, 1944, "on terms Moscow virtually dictated." The coup effectively amounted to a "capitulation", an "unconditional" "surrender" to the Soviets and the rest of the Allies. In the wake of the cease fire order given by King Michael, between 114,000 and 160,000 Romanian soldiers were taken prisoners of war by the Soviets without resisting, and they were forced to march to remote detention camps, located in the Soviet Union; according to survivors interviewed in a 2004 documentary, up to a third of the prisoners perished on the way.

By August 30, Soviet troops had reached Bucharest; by September 12, the Red Army had already gained control over much of the Romanian territory. Under the terms of its Armistice Agreement with the Allies, Romania became subject to an Allied Control Commission, composed of representatives of the Soviet Union, the United States, and the United Kingdom, while the Soviet military command exercised predominant, de facto authority. Bessarabia and Northern Bukovina were again incorporated into the Soviet Union.

At the beginning of the occupation, pillaging and rapes of Romanian women by Soviet soldiers were recorded, prefiguring the eventual epidemic of rape during the occupation of Germany. To this day, this remains a sensitive subject; for instance, in late 2018, the Russian Embassy in Romania denounced "the existence in Romania of a campaign of denigration against the Red Army," by means of which the Soviet soldiers were presented as "a gang of robbers and rapists," instead of "liberators of Romania." Historians Mădălin Hodor and Vadim Guzun disputed these assertions, the latter noting that "the USSR occupied, dismembered and Sovietized Romania. Red Army atrocities cannot be washed away with offensive statements, which disagree with the truth."

== Founding documents ==
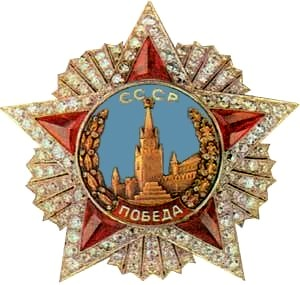
King Michael I of Romania was awarded the Order of Victory (the highest Soviet order) for his personal courage in overthrowing Ion Antonescu in the August 23 coup and for putting an end to Romania's war against the Allies.

=== The Armistice Agreement ===
Article 3 of the Armistice Agreement with Romania (signed in Moscow on September 12, 1944), stipulated that

The Government and High Command of Rumania will ensure to the Soviet and other Allied forces facilities for free movement on Rumanian territory in any direction if required by the military situation, the Rumanian Government and High Command of Rumania giving such movement every possible assistance with their own means of communications and at their own expense on land, on water and in the air.

Article 11 of the same agreement stipulated that Romania will compensate the Soviet Union for losses suffered in the war "to the amount of three hundred million United States dollars payable over six years in commodities (oil products, grain, timber products, seagoing and river craft, sundry machinery, et cetera)." Article 18 stipulated that

An Allied Control Commission will be established which will undertake until the conclusion of peace the regulation of and control over the execution of the present terms under the general direction and orders of the Allied (Soviet) High Command, acting on behalf of the Allied Powers.

In the Annex to Article 18, it was made clear that

The Rumanian Government and their organs shall fulfill all instructions of the Allied Control Commission arising out of the Armistice Agreement

and that The Allied Control Commission would have its seat in Bucharest.

In line with Article 14 of the Armistice Agreement, two People's Tribunals were set up for the purpose of trying suspected war criminals, one in Bucharest, and the other in Cluj.

The plenipotentiary signatories to the armistice as indicated therein were:

- Allied powers: "representative of the Allied (Soviet) High Command, Marshal of the Soviet Union, R. Y. Malinovski, duly authorized hereto by the Governments of the United States of America; the Soviet Union, and the United Kingdom."
- Romania: "Minister of State and Minister of Justice L. Patrascanu, Deputy Minister of Internal Affairs, Adjutant of His Majesty the King of Rumania General D. Damaceanu, Prince Stirbey, and Mr. G. Popp."

=== Paris Peace Treaties, 1947 ===
The effect of the Armistice Agreement ceased on September 15, 1947, when the Paris Peace Treaty with Romania entered into force. Article 21, paragraph 1 of the new treaty provided the legal foundation for continued and unlimited Soviet military presence in Romania:

Upon the coming into force of the present Treaty, all Allied Forces shall, within a period of 90 days, be withdrawn from Roumania, subject to the right of the Soviet Union to keep on Roumanian territory such armed forces as it may need for the maintenance of the lines of communication of the Soviet Army with the Soviet zone of occupation in Austria.

The Romanian delegation at the Paris Conference was headed by Minister of Foreign Affairs Gheorghe Tătărescu. The Peace Treaty with Romania was signed on February 10, 1947, in the Salon de l'Horloge of the Ministère des Affaires Étrangères. On the Romanian side, the four signatories were Gheorghe Tătărescu, Lucrețiu Pătrășcanu, Ștefan Voitec, and Dumitru Dămăceanu. The signatories for the Allied powers included United States Secretary of State James F. Byrnes, Soviet Foreign Minister Vyacheslav Molotov, and British Secretary of State for Foreign and Commonwealth Affairs Ernest Bevin.

== Soviet forces in Romania, 1944–1956 ==
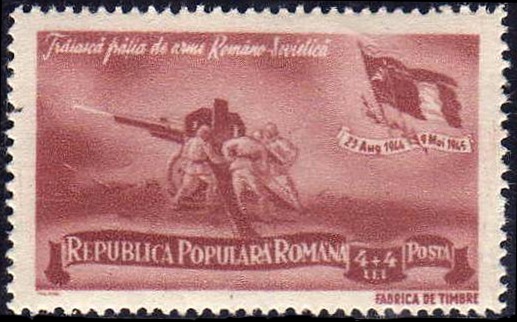
1948 Romanian stamp

Estimated strength of Soviet forces in Romania
Date	Strength
May 8, 1945	80,000
November 1, 1945	500,000
January 4, 1946	420,000
March 1, 1946	615,000
June 1, 1946	400,000
November 1, 1946	240,000
1947	60,000 – 130,000
May 1 – July 1, 1948	35,000
October 1, 1948	32,000
July 1, 1949	28,000
October 1, 1949	19,000
January 1, 1950	32,000
April 1, 1950	33,000
September 1, 1950 – September 1952	32,000

After the conclusion of the Armistice Agreement in 1944, Soviet troops occupied the entire territory of Romania. Estimates of troop levels vary between 750,000 and 1 million (estimates of British military officials), to between 1 and 1.5 million (estimates of the Romanian General Staff); many Western diplomats and experts refer to more than 1 million Soviet troops.

On November 8, 1945, King Michael's name day, an anti-communist demonstration in front of the Royal Palace in Bucharest was met with force, resulting in dozens of casualties. Soviet officers restrained Romanian soldiers and police from firing on civilians, and Soviet troops restored order.

The estimated strength of Soviet forces stationed in Romania (including air, navy, ground, and security troops), from VE Day to 1952, is shown in the table on the right.

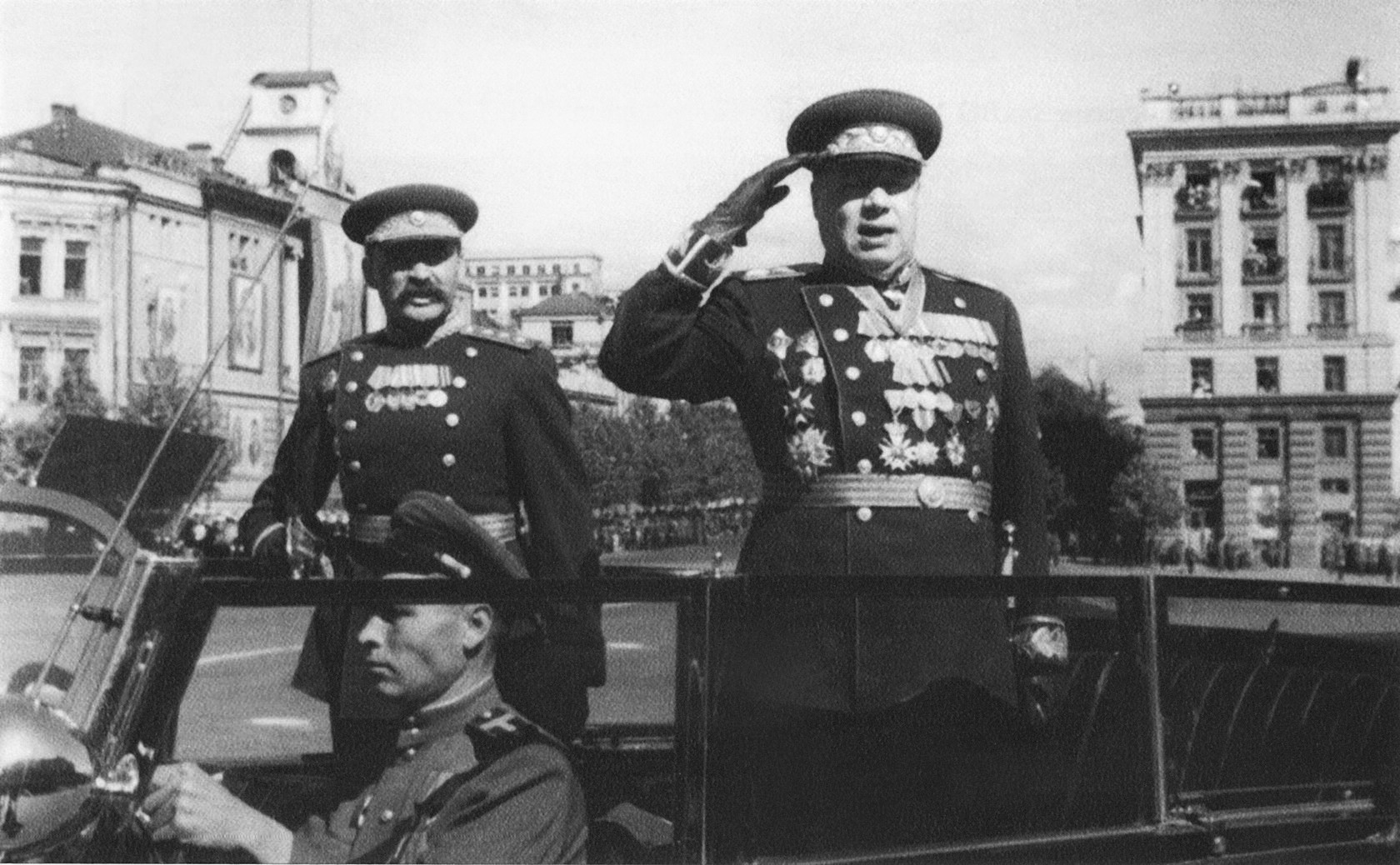
Marshal Fyodor Tolbukhin at a military parade, Bucharest 1949

During the second half of 1946, more than half of the combat capabilities of the Soviet Air Forces were residing outside the USSR, with the largest portion in Poland and Romania (2,500 planes in each country). The troop levels surged to a high of 615,000 in March 1946, but they were drawn down after the conclusion of the Peace Treaty in 1947. By the end of 1946, Soviet units in Romania were concentrated in four areas: Craiova–Slatina, Sibiu–Alba-Iulia, Constanța, and Brăila–Focșani. Troop levels reached a relatively stable level from May 1948 until October 1956: two full divisions, plus supporting units adding up to roughly a third division.

Although with the signing of the Austrian State Treaty in 1955 the reason for the presence of Soviet troops as stated in the Paris Peace Treaties ceased to exist, Premier Gheorghe Gheorghiu-Dej announced that these troops would stay as long as foreign soldiers continue to be stationed in West Germany.

Soviet troops stationed in Romania participated in the suppression of the Hungarian Revolution of November 1956. Soviet troop facilities inside Romania were off limits to all Romanians at the time.

== Reorganization of the Romanian Army ==
Treaty limited Romanian forces
Type	Strength
Land forces	120,000 officers and troops
Anti-aircraft forces	5,000 officers and troops
Naval forces	5,000 officers and troops
Air forces	8,000 officers and troops
Total	138,000 officers and troops

The Soviet occupation of Romania led to a complete reorganization of the Romanian People's Army under the supervision of Soviet Army representatives. The manpower of the Romanian army was limited by the Paris Peace Treaty to a total of 138,000 (officers and troops); however, under the Soviet occupation it grew far beyond the limits imposed by the treaty, through increasing militarization of Romania's population. By 1953, regular army forces had grown to approximately 300,000; reserve army forces to approximately 135,000; and "interior" forces (border guards, security brigades, et al.) under the jurisdiction of the Ministry of the Interior to over 325,000.

At the inception of this organizational overhaul, pro-German elements were purged from the Romanian armed forces. In 1944–45, two divisions composed of Romanian volunteers—former prisoners of war, trained in the Soviet Union during the war, and also Communist activists such as Valter Roman—were formed: the Tudor Vladimirescu Division, under the command of Colonel Nicolae Cambrea, and the Horea, Cloșca și Crișan Division, under the command of General Mihail Lascăr (who was to serve as Minister of Defense from 1946 to 1947). These two units were to form the nucleus of the new Romanian Army under Soviet control. Once the Romanian Communist Party took the reins of power, 30% of officers and noncommissioned officers (mostly experienced soldiers, but at the same time a potential source of opposition to the Sovietization of the Army) were purged from the military.

Following the Romanian Workers' Party seizure of political power, the Sovietization of the Romanian army went into full gear, under the supervision of the new Minister of Defense, Emil Bodnăraș. This reorganization involved the adoption of the Soviet model of military and political organization, and a change of the military doctrine of combat and defense, in the context of Romania's integration into the Soviet strategic system, at the dawn of the Cold War.

Soviet officers were appointed as advisers charged with supervising the thorough reorganization of the army. They held leadership and surveillance positions in the main institutions of the state, but also in areas of lesser importance. In the beginning, they only held a few positions in the Ministry of Defense, the General Staff, and the political sections inside the army. With the passage of time, the number of Soviet advisers gradually increased, while at the same time their positions became permanent. In November 1952, there were 105 permanent and 17 temporary Soviet adviser positions in military schools. After 1955, their number began to decrease: 72 in 1955, 63 in 1956, 25 in 1957, and 10 in 1958.

After 1945, new military regulations were developed, following the templates of the Red Army, and they were finalized in 1949–1952. Consequently, a number of officers and military students were sent to the Soviet Union to complete their training. Between 1949 and 1952, 717 Romanian students were being trained in the USSR, while in 1958 471 Romanian military students were pursuing education in the USSR. Their number decreased in the following years.

== Reorganization of the intelligence services ==
Immediately following the August 23, 1944, events, communists began to infiltrate the Ministry of Internal Affairs on a large scale. Starting in October 1944, the chief of NKVD operations in Romania was colonel Nikolai Petrovich Zudov. The General Directorate of the Security of the People (Romanian initials: DGSP, but more commonly just called the Securitate) was officially founded on August 30, 1948, by Decree 221/30. The Securitate was set up by SMERSH, an NKVD unit charged with dismantling the existing intelligence agencies and replacing them with Soviet-style bodies in the Soviet-occupied countries of Eastern Europe. The SMERSH unit in Romania, called Brigada Mobilă, was led until 1948 by the former NKVD operative Alexandru Nicolschi. Its stated purpose was to "defend democratic conquests and guarantee the safety of the Romanian People's Republic against both internal and external enemies." The first Director of the Securitate was Soviet intelligence operative Gheorghe Pintilie. Alexandru Nicolschi (by then a general) and another Soviet officer, Major General Vladimir Mazuru, held the two deputy director positions.

== Expulsion of Germans ==
The Red Army took part in the expulsion of up to 70,000 Transylvanian Saxons from Romania that was initiated in January 1945. In October 1944, the Sănătescu government, at the request of the Allied Control Commission, began arresting young Romanian citizens of German descent, who were eventually placed at the disposal of the Soviet command. At the request of the Allied Commission, the Rădescu government ordered the forced transportation by train of Transylvanian Saxons to the Soviet Union. In a protest dated January 13, 1945, the Rădescu government affirmed the Romanian government's duty to protect each of its citizens, regardless of ethnic origin, and noted the absence of a legal basis for the deportation of the Transylvanian Saxons. The expellees were gradually allowed to return to Romania between late 1945 and 1949, though it is estimated that up to 10,000 perished during the expulsion or while in the Soviet Union. Such deportations would be outlawed in 1949 by the Fourth Geneva Convention.

== SovRoms ==
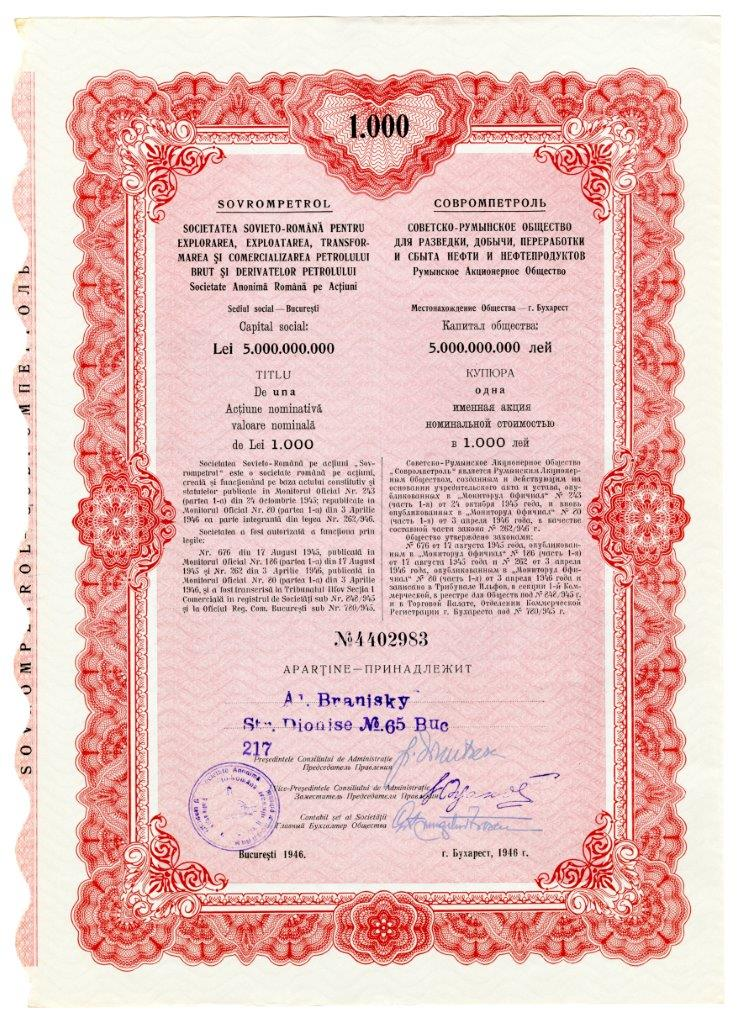
A nominal 1,000 lei Sovrompetrol stock certificate, Bucharest, 1946

The SovRoms were Soviet-Romanian joint ventures established on Romanian territory at the end of World War II, and lasting until 1954–1956. An agreement between the two countries regarding the establishment of these enterprises was signed in Moscow on May 8, 1945. In theory, the purpose of these ventures was to generate funding for post-war reconstruction efforts. However, their real purpose was to provide resources for the Soviet side. Generally, they were a contributing factor to the draining of Romania's resources, in addition to the war reparations demanded by the Armistice Agreement and the Paris Peace Treaties, which had been initially set at 300 million U.S. dollars. At the agreement on reparations signed in Bucharest on January 16, 1945, the Soviets imposed the dollar as the reference currency at its exchange rate in 1938; due to the dollar's devaluation in the meantime, in actuality the reparations amounted to 384 million dollars.

The Soviet contribution to the creation of the SovRoms consisted mostly in reselling leftover German equipment to Romania, at systematically overvalued prices. The total value of goods sent from Romania to the Soviet Union was estimated at 2 billion dollars, exceeding by far the amount of war reparations demanded by the Soviets. By 1952, 85% of Romanian exports were directed towards the Soviet Union. The last Sovrom was dissolved in 1956.

One of these companies was Sovromcuarț, which started its operations in 1950 at the Băița mine in Bihor County, under a name that was meant to conceal the true object of its activity. Its initial workforce consisted of 15,000 political prisoners; after most of them died of radiation poisoning, they were replaced by local villagers, who were completely unaware of the fact that they were working with radioactive material. Romania secretly delivered 17,288 tons of uranium ore to the Soviet Union between 1952 and 1960, which was used, at least in part, in the Soviet atomic bomb project. Uranium mining continued there until 1961. All ore was shipped abroad for processing, initially to Sillamäe in the Estonian SSR; the uranium concentrate was then used exclusively by the Soviet Union.

== Comparison with Soviet occupation of Bulgaria ==
Comparing the Soviet occupation of Romania to that of Bulgaria, David Stone notes: "Unlike Bulgaria, Romania had few cultural and historical ties with Russia, and had actually waged war on the Soviet Union. As a result, Soviet occupation weighted heavier on the Romanian people, and the troops themselves were less disciplined."

== In popular culture ==
- Davai ceas, davai palton (eng.: give the wristwatch, give the overcoat). The well-known Romanian stage actor Constantin Tănase was performing in Bucharest a year after the arrival of Soviet troops. He used to satirize the soldiers' habit of "requisitioning" all personal property in sight (in particular, wristwatches and coats), demanding them by saying, "Davai ceas, davai palton". There are differing accounts of his demise, in August 1945, but one of them states that he was found dead two days after one of his satirical acts.
- The writer Mihail Sebastian was among the eyewitnesses to the events of 1944. In his diary (Journal, 1935–1944: The Fascist Years), he described the atmosphere in Bucharest at the time, as follows: "Bewilderment, fear, doubt. Russian soldiers rape women (as Dina Cocea was saying yesterday). Soldiers stop cars, let the driver and passengers out, get behind the wheel, and take off. Stores looted. This afternoon, at Zaharia, three of them broke in the safe, taking watches (The watch is the toy they like the best)". Sebastian died in a tram accident just weeks after the Soviet Army occupied Romania. In 2004, American playwright David Auburn wrote a one-man play, entitled The Journals of Mihail Sebastian; it made its debut the same year in New York City, starring actor Stephen Kunken in the role of Sebastian.
- The 25th Hour. Virgil Gheorghiu's best-known book depicts the plight of a young farmhand, Johann Moritz, under German and Soviet occupation. Johann is sent to a labor camp by a police captain who covets his wife, Suzanna. At first, he is tagged as a Jew. Later, he is "rescued" by a Nazi officer, who forces him into service as a model for German propaganda. Imprisoned after the war, he is severely beaten by his Russian captors, then put on trial by Allied forces because of his work for the Nazis. In 1967, Carlo Ponti produced a film based on this book; directed by Henri Verneuil, it featured Anthony Quinn as Johann and Virna Lisi as Suzanna.

== See also ==
- Romania during World War II
- Romanian anti-communist resistance movement
- Southern Group of Forces
- Soviet occupations
