= Costescu =

Costescu is a Romanian surname that may refer to:

- Daniel Costescu (born 1976), former Romanian footballer
- Grigore Costescu (1934–2008), Romanian basketball player and Olympian
- Nicolae Costescu (1888–1963), Romanian Brigadier-General during World War II
- Theodor Costescu (1864–1939), Romanian educator and politician
