= Gică =

Gică is a Romanian diminutive of George or Gheorghe, and may refer to:

- Gică Craioveanu, footballer
- Gică Hagi, footballer
- Gică Petrescu, singer
- Gică Popescu, footballer
