= Constantinescu =

Constantinescu (or Constantinesco, its Francisized version), is a common Romanian surname. Notable people with the surname include:

- Alecu Constantinescu (1872–1949), Romanian journalist and communist activist
- Alexandru C. Constantinescu (1859–1926), Romanian politician
- Constantin Constantinescu-Claps (1884–1961), Romanian General
- Elena Constantinescu (1925–2005), British nightclub owner and spy
- Emil Constantinescu (born 1939), Romanian professor and politician, President of Romania 1996–2000
- Eugen Constantinescu (1890–1975), Romanian writer and trade unionist
- George Constantinescu (1881–1965), Romanian scientist and inventor
- Ion Constantinescu (1896–?), Romanian brigadier-general
- Liviu Constantinescu (1914–1997), Romanian geophysicist
- Marian Constantinescu (born 1981), Romanian footballer
- Mihai Constantinescu (born 1932), Romanian film director
- Miron Constantinescu (1917–1974), Romanian sociologist, historian, and communist politician
- Mitiță Constantinescu (1890–1946), Romanian economist and politician
- Nicu Constantinescu (1840–1905), Romanian liberal politician, mayor of Buzău
- Ovidiu Constantinescu (1933–2012), Romanian mycologist
- Paul Constantinescu (1909–1963), Romanian composer
- Pompiliu Constantinescu (1901–1946), Romanian literary historian and critic
- Stefan Constantinescu (born 1968), Swedish-Romanian visual artist and film director
- Tancred Constantinescu (1878–1951), Romanian general and politician
- Vladimir Constantinescu (1895–1965), Romanian major-general

== See also ==
- Constantinesco (automobile)
