= Beldiceanu =

Beldiceanu is a Romanian surname. Notable people with the surname include:

- Ioan Beldiceanu, Romanian general in World War II
- Nicolae Beldiceanu, Romanian poet and novelist
- Nicolae N. Beldiceanu, Romanian short story writer and son of Nicolae
