= Irimești =

Irimeşti may refer to several places in Romania:

- Irimeşti, a village administered by Breaza town, Prahova County
- Irimeşti, a village administered by Bălceşti town, Vâlcea County
