= Pogana =

- Commune
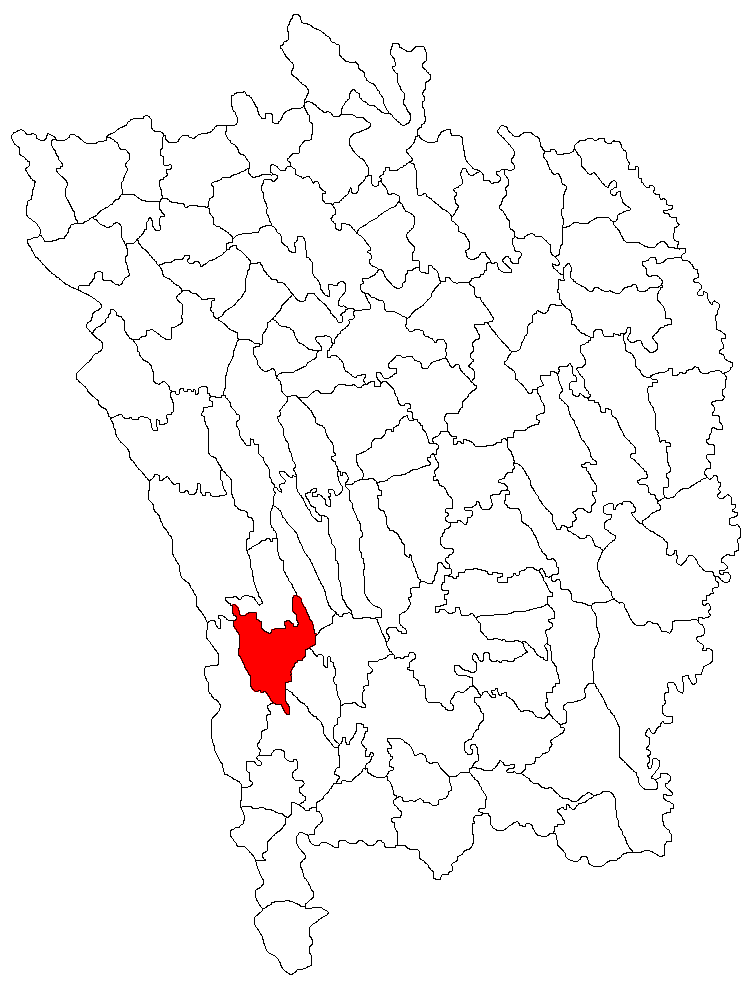
- Location in Vaslui County

- Location in Romania
- Coordinates: 46°19′N 27°34′E
- Country: Romania
- County: Vaslui
- Established: 1433 (first attested)
- Subdivisions: Bogești, Cârjoani, Măscurei, Pogana, Tomești

Government
  - Mayor (2020–2024): Cristian Spridon (PNL)
- Area: 51.00 km^{2} (19.69 sq mi)
- Elevation: 110 m (360 ft)
- Population (2021-12-01): 3,007
  - Density: 59/km^{2} (150/sq mi)
- Time zone: EET/EEST (UTC+2/+3)
- Postal code: 737410
- Area code: +40 x37
- Vehicle reg.: VS
- Website: www.comunapogana.ro

Pogana is a commune in Vaslui County, Western Moldavia, Romania. It is composed of five villages: Bogești, Cârjoani, Măscurei, Pogana, and Tomești.

== Natives ==
- Gheorghe Cosma (1892–1969), major general during World War II
