= Petrache Poenaru =

Romanian inventor (1799–1875)

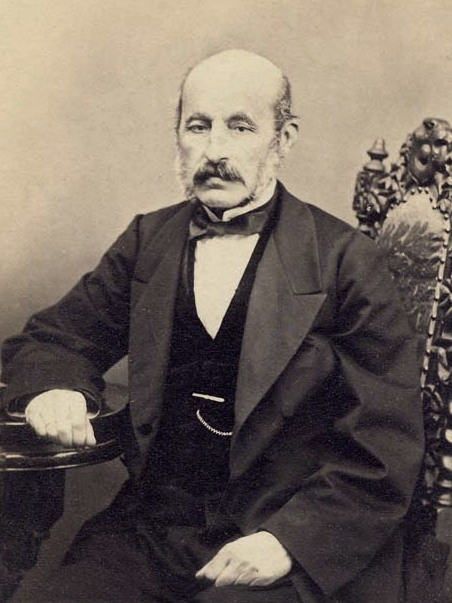
- An 1860s photograph by Carol Szathmari
- Born: 10 January 1799; Benești, Vâlcea County, Wallachia
- Died: 2 October 1875 (aged 76); Bucharest, Romania
- Occupations: Inventor, mathematician, physicist, teacher, politician
- Known for: Inventing the fountain pen

Petrache Poenaru (Romanian pronunciation: [peˈtrake po.eˈnaru]; 10 January 1799 – 2 October 1875) was a Romanian inventor.

Poenaru, who had studied in Paris and Vienna and, later, completed his specialized studies in England, was a mathematician, physicist, engineer, inventor, teacher and organizer of the educational system, as well as a politician, agronomist, and zootechnologist, founder of the Philharmonic Society, the Botanical Gardens and the National Museum of Antiquities in Bucharest.

While a student in Paris, Petrache Poenaru invented the world's first fountain pen, an invention for which the French Government issued a patent on 25 May 1827.

== Biography ==
He was born in 1799 in Benești, Vâlcea County, in the northwestern part of Wallachia. His uncle, Iordache Otetelişanu, was one of the promoters of an institutionalized educational system, in a time when a great part of the population was illiterate. Poenaru attended the secondary school Obedeanu in Craiova and worked as a copyist at the office of the bishop of Râmnicu Vâlcea. Later on, between 1820 and 1821, he taught Greek at the Metropolitan School in Bucharest.

In 1821, the Revolution led by Tudor Vladimirescu began. At that time, Wallachia was under Ottoman domination and was ruled by the Phanariots (Greeks originating from Constantinople and very loyal to the Sultan), who burdened the country with numerous taxes and an expensive and corrupt court. Tudor Vladimirescu gathered an army of Oltenian soldiers called panduri and moved towards Bucharest to overthrow them. He was joined by many and, among them, was the young Petrache Poenaru. During his first skirmish, he proved he didn't have any fighting abilities and his comrades took him in front of the revolution's leader, for punishment. But Vladimirescu was impressed by the young man's educated spirit and sharp mind and made him his personal assistant. From this position, he elaborated the army's manifesto, now considered one of the first Romanian newspapers.

Poenaru was lucky enough not to be around Tudor Vladimirescu when the leader was lured in a trap and assassinated, as he was sent in a diplomatic mission to advocate the Romanian cause to the representatives of the great powers, Russia, Austria or England. After news of Vladimirescu's death spread, he took refuge in Sibiu.

When the political situation improved, he was able to earn a scholarship to study in Vienna, in 1822. There, he learnt about measuring tools and micrometers, unknown to the underdeveloped Romanian engineering field and discovered a great appetite for technical sciences, while also fervently studying Greek, Latin, French, Italian and English. In a letter sent to his family, he confessed that he thought the sweetest pleasure a man can experience is learning.

In 1824, the Wallachian ruler Grigore Ghica granted him another scholarship, which compelled Poenaru to return to the country after the studies ended and share his acquired knowledge as a teacher.

== Poenaru's fountain pen ==
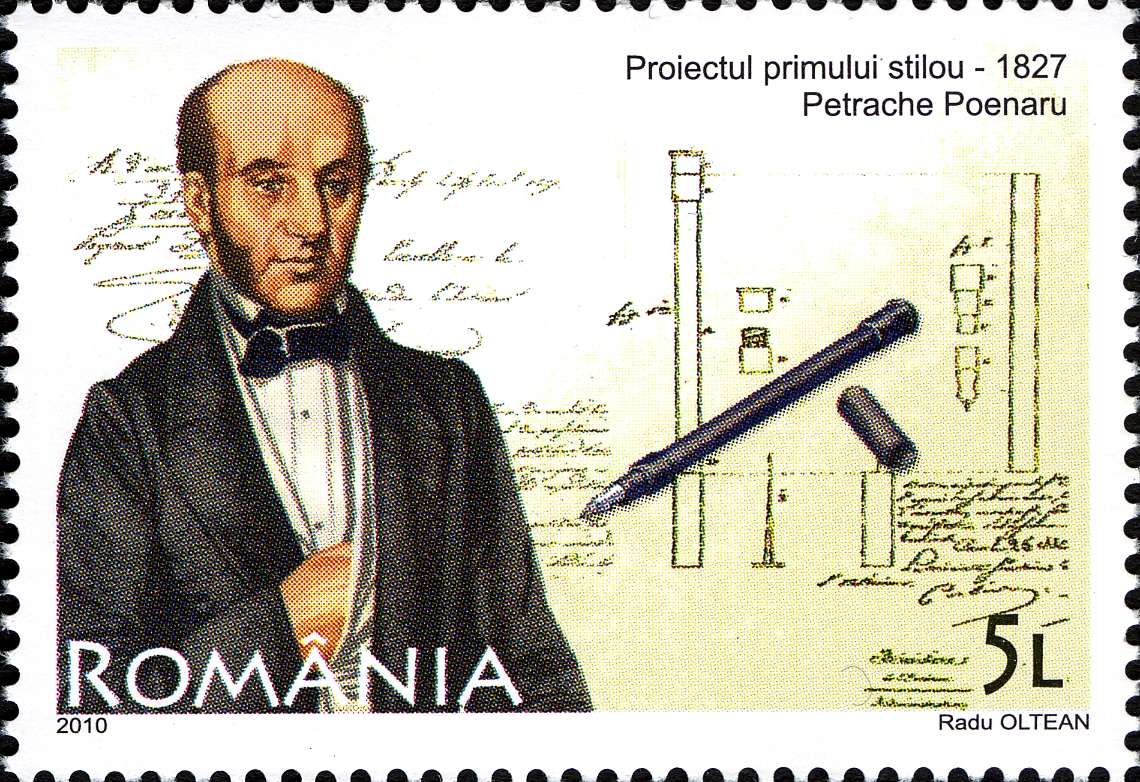
Postage stamp commemorating Poenaru's invention

In 1826 he went to France and attended the École Polytechnique in Paris, where he studied geodesy and surveying. He was so busy taking notes and copying courses, that he invented a fountain pen that used a swan's quill as an ink reservoir. On 25 May 1827, the Manufacture Department of the French Ministry of the Interior registered Poenaru's invention with the code number 3208 and the description "plume portable sans fin, qui s’alimente elle-meme avec de l’ancre" ("never-ending portable pen, which recharges itself with ink").

In 2010 Poșta Română issued a 5 lei stamp depicting Poenaru next to his fountain pen project.

The Petrache Poenaru metro station in Bucharest is named in his honor.
