= Filipeștii de Pădure =

- Commune
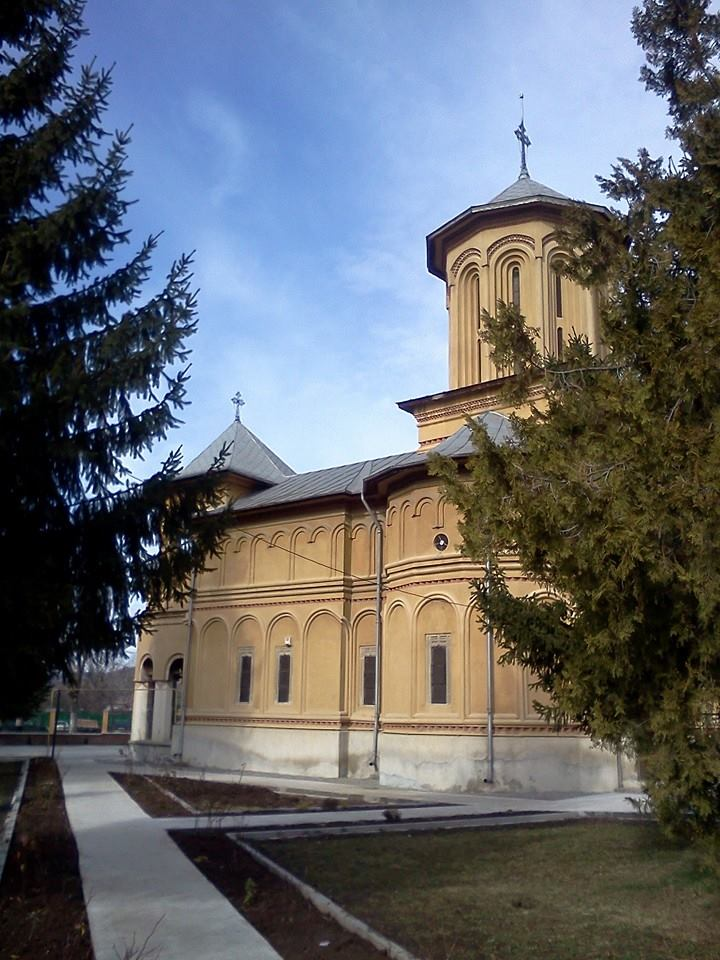
- Sfinții Trei Ierarhi Church (1688), Filipeștii de Pădure village

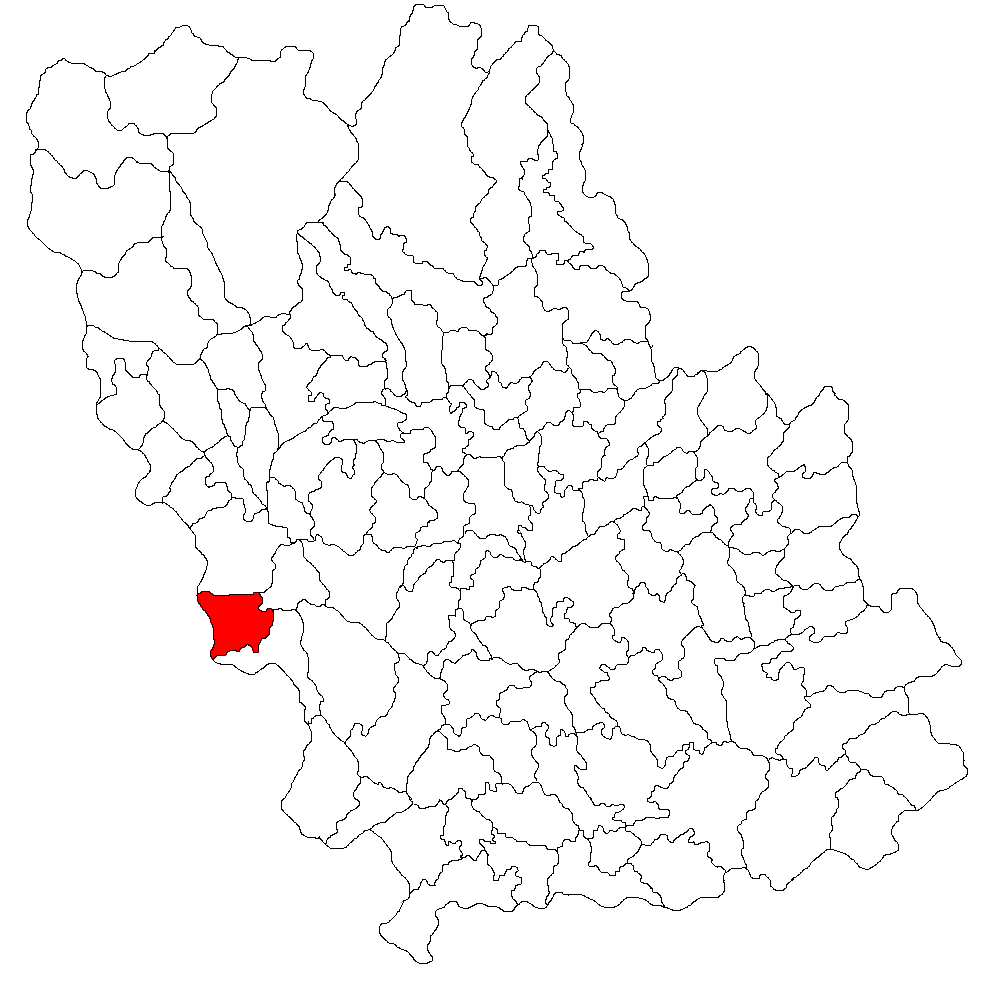
- Location in Prahova County

- Location in Romania
- Coordinates: 45°00′N 25°45′E
- Country: Romania
- County: Prahova

Government
  - Mayor (2024–2028): Ion-Gabriel Frunză (PSD)
- Area: 48.64 km^{2} (18.78 sq mi)
- Elevation: 302 m (991 ft)
- Population (2021-12-01): 9,736
  - Density: 200.2/km^{2} (518.4/sq mi)
- Time zone: UTC+02:00 (EET)
  - Summer (DST): UTC+03:00 (EEST)
- Postal code: 107245
- Area code: +(40) 244
- Vehicle reg.: PH
- Website: filipestiidepadure.ro

Filipeștii de Pădure is a commune in Prahova County, Muntenia, Romania. It is composed of four villages: Dițești, Filipeștii de Pădure, Minieri, and Siliștea Dealului.

Historical population
| Year | Pop. | ±% |
|---|---|---|
| 1992 | 10,825 | — |
| 2002 | 10,338 | −4.5% |
| 2011 | 10,358 | +0.2% |
| 2021 | 9,736 | −6.0% |
Source: Census data

== Natives ==
- Constantin Croitoru (born 1952), Lieutenant General, Chief of Staff of the Romanian Air Force (2007–2009)
- Maria Mihăescu (known as Mița Biciclista, 1885–1968), the first woman from Romania to ride a bicycle
