= Poroina Mare =

- Commune
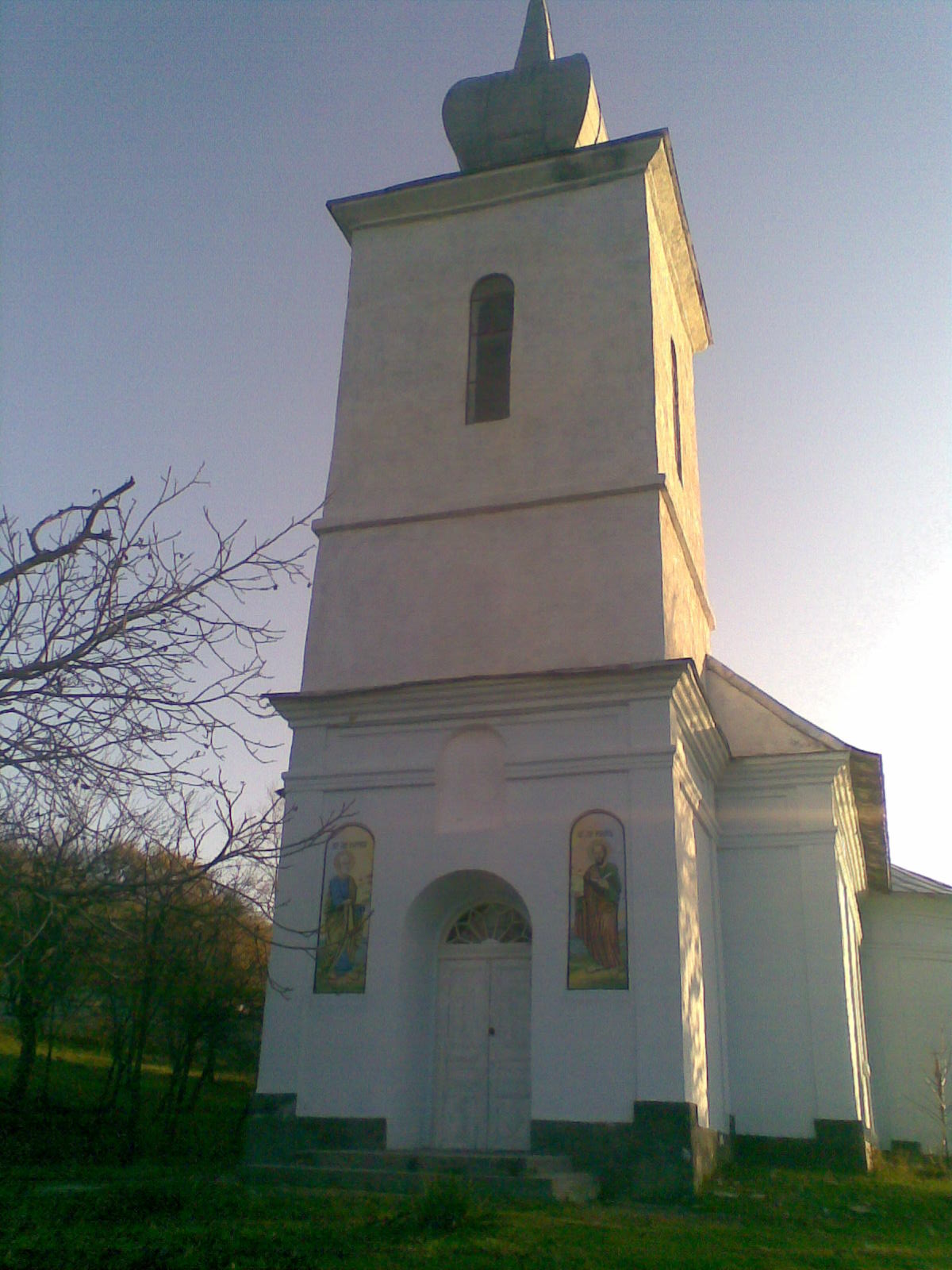
- Church in Poroina Mare

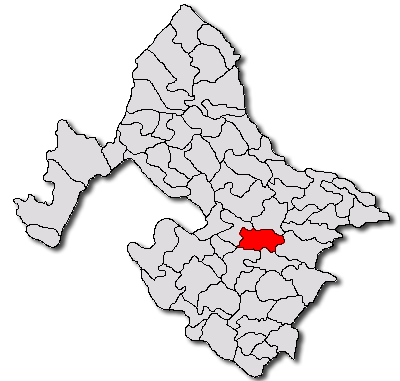
- Location in Mehedinți County

- Location in Romania
- Coordinates: 44°30′N 22°56′E
- Country: Romania
- County: Mehedinți

Government
  - Mayor (2024–2028): Valentin Laurențiu Anuța (PSD)
- Area: 54.74 km^{2} (21.14 sq mi)
- Elevation: 293 m (961 ft)
- Population (2021-12-01): 866
  - Density: 15.8/km^{2} (41.0/sq mi)
- Time zone: UTC+02:00 (EET)
  - Summer (DST): UTC+03:00 (EEST)
- Postal code: 227380
- Area code: +(40) 0252
- Vehicle reg.: MH
- Website: www.comunaporoinamare.ro

Poroina Mare is a commune located in Mehedinți County, Oltenia, Romania. It is composed of four villages: Fântânile Negre, Poroina Mare, Stignița, and Șipotu.

Historical population
Year	Pop.	±%
2002	1,422	—
2011	1,048	−26.3%
2021	866	−17.4%
Source: Census data

== Natives ==
- Petre Cameniță (1889–1962), major-general during World War II
