= Barbu Bălcescu =

Barbu Bălcescu (1821 or 1825—January 12, 1884) was a Wallachian, later Romanian lawyer and revolutionary, the younger brother of Nicolae Bălcescu.

Born in Bălcești, Vâlcea County, he attended the Law faculties of the Saint Sava College and of the University of Paris; his thesis was on the inalienability of property gained through dowries. During the Wallachian Revolution of 1848, the Provisional Government assigned him as commissioner of Buzău County. On 8 September, he corresponded with his brother, a leader of the revolution, and took part in the public burning of Regulamentul Organic. He was arrested in Bucharest and subsequently departed for Ottoman-administered Constanța.

In 1856, he was part of the Bucharest magistrates' corps. He belonged to the Bucharest Court of Appeals from 1859 to 1864, and was a lawyer in Craiova from 1864 to 1876. In 1870 he was inspector for private schools in Dolj County, and he served as Mayor of Craiova in 1875. His three daughters were renowned for their beauty: Olga, married to General Petre Gigurtu and the mother of Ion Gigurtu; Ana, married to Dr. Dimitrie Culcer; and Zoe, married to judge Nicolae Mandrea. In the summer of 1878, the poet Mihai Eminescu visited his country house in Florești. His Craiova home, built in the 19th century, still stands. Originally interred in Craiova's Sineasca Cemetery, in 2003 he was reburied near the Nicolae Bălcescu Memorial in Nicolae Bălcescu, Vâlcea County.
