= Gheorghe Pohrib =

Gheorghe Pohrib was a colonel of the Romanian firefighters. He organized the Romanian firefighter units after World War I and extended their role to cover other activities related to civil defense.

== Reorganization of firefighter units ==
The Romanian firefighter units were subordinated to the artillery regiments of the Romanian Army according to the provisions of Royal Decree No. 702 of 1874. In 1912, by Royal Decree No. 2222 of 1912 the "Inspectorate for Military Firefighters" (Inspectoratul Pompierilor Military) was created. Further reform was however stopped due to World War 1.

Gheorghe Pohrib, an artillery officer, who had been assigned to the firefighters battalion of Bucharest in 1907, was promoted to the rank of lieutenant-colonel (consequently colonel) and appointed inspector general of the firefighters in 1920. He had the responsibility of reorganizing the firefighter units and of unifying the structures in the newly gained provinces.

As a result of colonel Pohrib's endeavours, by 1929 the Romanian firefighters included following units:

- The Firefighters Command (formally established on August 2, 1929)
- The School of Firefighting non-commissioned officers;
- A training center for the personnel and instructors of the military firefighters units as well as of the commanders of the volunteer firefighters units.
- Workshops for maintaining and repairing firefighting equipment and storage of intervention materials.
- Firefighter units located in 30 cities (companies and sections).

At the same time Gheorghe Pohrib established the “Romanian Firefighters Newsletter” (Buletinul Pompierilor Români) which is still published, at present under the name “Revista Pompierii Români”

== Integration of firefighters into the civil defense structures ==
Gheorghe Pohrib expanded the responsibility of the firefighters to other types of rescue operations. In 1928, the International Committee of the Red Cross raised for the first time the issue of creating structures in charge of the protection of civilian population against chemical attacks and of preparing regulations to deal with such events. A special commission for the study and proposal of measures for civil defense was instituted by order No. 513 of June 21, 1928 of the Ministry of War. The commission included colonel Gheorghe Pohrib, head of the firefighter department, colonel George E. Popescu, head of the department of defense against chemical warfare as well as representatives of various concerned ministries. After one year the commission presented its conclusions to the Council of Ministers who, on October 25, 1929, approved the proposed instructions, to which colonel Gheorghe Pohrib had contributed to a significant extent. This is the first legislation in Romania which created an organization for the protection of the civilian population in case of an armed conflict.

Colonel Gheorghe Pohrib had an essential contribution in preparing the legislation for civil defense (called "passive defense" at that time). Law No. 1245 of 1933 and Royal Decree 468 of February 28, 1933 defined the responsibilities of the firefighters in preparation, mitigation and response in civil defense operations. As a result, the military firefighter unit were provided with special machinery, equipment, accessories and materials required for saving people trapped under wrecked buildings, for decontamination of poisonous gases, for the destruction of unexploded bombs, for alerting the population and for medical first aid. The day of promulgation of the Decree, February 28, has since been declared the "Day of Civil Defense".

Colonel Gheorghe Pohrib continued his efforts to ensure the legal provisions required for the activities of the firefighters and was able to convince the authorities to approve Law 815 of April 3, 1936 for the Organization of the Corps of Military Firefighters.

Pohrib retired in 1937 after having been commander of the Romanian military firefighters for over 17 years, the longest interval any firefighter chief ever held the position. The organization he set was to be tested and to prove its efficiency a few years after his retirement, in the years of World War II.

== International activity ==
Due to World War I, the activities of the International Technical Committee for the Prevention and Extinction of Fire – CNIF, which had been established in 1900, had practically been halted. An International Congress of Firefighters was organized on July 5, 1928 in Czechoslovakia with the objective of reorganizing the committee. The discussions were continued the following year, on June 24, 1929, in Paris, where the congress approved the new bylaws of the organization and elected as chairman colonel Paul Pouderoux, commander of the Firefighters Regiment of Paris. In both congresses, Romania was represented by Colonel Gheorghe Pohrib.

The following congress was organized in Paris on July 1–5, 1931, at the same time as the “First International Exhibition of Firefighting”. Romania was represented by colonel Gheorghe Pohrib, Commander of the Military Firefighters Corps and by Professor Valeriu Zaharescu, the chemical expert of the firefighters. Other reunions of the organization, which Gheorghe Pohrib attended, were organized on July 1, 1934 in Paris and on July 8, 1936 in Vienna. In recognition of Gheorghe Pohrib's contributions, on December 31, 1935, Paul Pouderoux, who had been advanced to the rank of general, awarded him an honor diploma of the CNIF.

== Study of the history of Romanian firefighters ==
In 1935 colonel Gheorghe Pohrib, in cooperation with lieutenant colonel N. Lupaşcu and captain P.V. Petăleanu published an extensive history of the Romanian firefighters, to commemorate 100 years since the creation of the first units of military firefighters in the Romanian Principalities.

The volume presents the first firefighter units in Moldavia and Wallachia. It then emphasizes the battle of Dealul Spirii, during the Wallachian Revolution of 1848, when the firemen opposed the Ottoman army. He then presents the activities of the firefighters until 1935. The volume presents documents related to the organization of firefighters in Romania and also the most important fires in major Romanian cities in which the intervention of the firefighters was required.

== Works ==
- Col. Gh. Pohrib, Lt.col. N. Lupaşcu, Cpt. P.V.Petăleanu – Istoricul Pompierilor Militari 1835–1935 – Imprimeriile Cartea Romaneasca, București, 1935
