= Paul Pouderoux =

Paul Pouderoux (11 February 1874 − 21 June 1956) was a French officer.

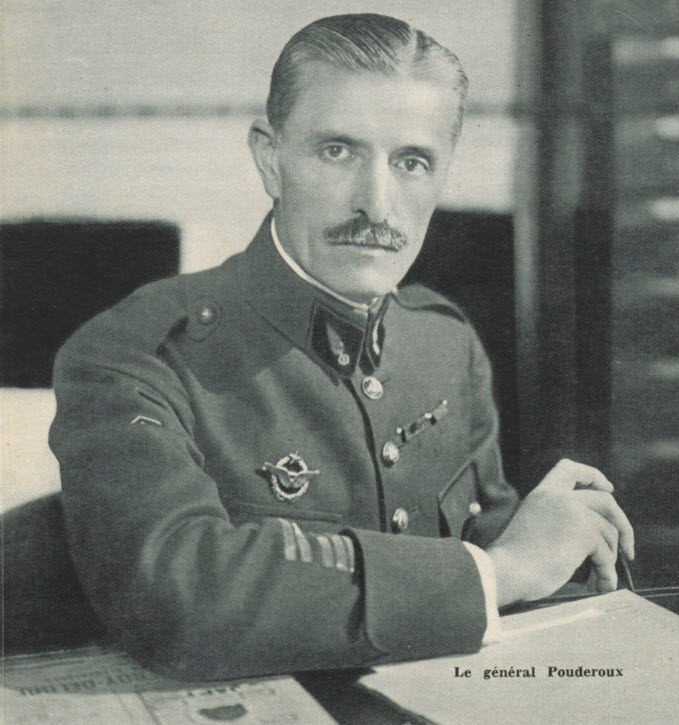
Paul Pouderoux in 1935

== Biography ==
During World War I, he first was an air force pilot and afterwards was in command of a regiment of sappers. After the war he was commander of the regiment of military firefighters of Paris . In 1929 he was active in reorganising the International Technical Committee for the Prevention and Extinction of Fire (CNIF). He also organised the Committees congresses of 1929, 1931 and 1934 in Paris, as well as the “First International Exhibition of Firefighting”. He was also elected chairman of the committee. He retired in 1934, after being promoted general. After his retirement, he was in charge of safety measures aboard ocean liners. General Pouderoux was active in leftist groups, such as the Republican Association of Old Combattants (French: Association Républicaine d’Anciens Combattants – ARAC) which had been established in 1917 by intellectuals such as Paul Vaillant-Couturier et Henri Barbusse and whose philosophy was inspired by the ideology of the Communist party on the 1930s. He also wrote pacifist publications such as the book “The aéro-chemical dangerimique or the dishonored war" or the article "Our international duty".

After the Liberation of France he was maire of the commune of Saint-Paul (Alpes-Maritimes). At the request of the Firefighters Brigade of Paris, in 2003 the mairie of Tremblay-en-France approved the change of name of the “Chemin des Vaches” to "Avenue du Général Pouderoux”. The street ensures the access to the local barracks of the Paris firefighters.

== Works ==
- Le Danger Aéro-Chimique ou la Guerre Deshonorée - Imprimerie Centrale Administrative - 1936
- Le Devoir International - Les Peuples Unis, No. 12 01 Dec. 1936 (avec J. Prudrommeaux).
