= Constantin Constantiniu =

Romanian general

- Born: July 2, 1894
- Died: February 2, 1971 (aged 76)
- Allegiance: Kingdom of Romania
- Service / branch: Romanian Land Forces
- Rank: Brigadier general
- Battles / wars: World War II

Constantin Constantiniu (2 July 1894–2 February 1971) was a Romanian brigadier general during World War II.

After becoming an officer in the Romanian Army, he advanced to lieutenant colonel in 1936 and colonel in 1940. He became Head Intendance Service in the Under-Secretary of the Air Force in 1941, and in 1944 was Head Intendance Service of the Army. In June 1945 he was promoted to brigadier general. In 1945 he was Director Higher Audition Department, in 1946 he was Inspector-General in General-Inspectorate of Intendance, in 1947 he was Director General Department for Administration of the Army, in 1948 he was Commandant Higher Administration School, and in 1949 he was Commandant Army Logistical Academy. Constantiniu retired in 1952.
