= Ion-Aurel Stanciu =

- Born: 27 March 1955 (age 71); Buzău
- Education: Aurel Vlaicu Flight School; Carol I National Defence University
- Military career
- Allegiance: Romania
- Branch: Romanian Air Force
- Service years: 1971-present
- Rank: General
- Commands: Chief of Staff of the Romanian Air Force

General Ion-Aurel Stanciu (born March 27, 1955, in Buzău) was the chief of the Romanian Air Force Staff from 17 February 2009 to 7 January 2011. He graduated the Aurel Vlaicu Flight School in 1977 and the Carol I National Defence University in 1986. He assumed office following the discharge of Lieutenant General Constantin Croitoru. He was previously manager of Romavia airlines, and deputy commander of Henri Coandă International Airport. On 7 January 2011 he was discharged from active duty and promoted to the rank of General.

== Rank promotion ==
- 1977 – Lieutenant;
- 1981 – Lieutenant-Major;
- 1986 – Captain;
- 1990 – Major;
- 1993 – Commanding-captain;
- 1998 – Commander;
- 2004 – General de flotilă aeriană;
- 2008 – Major-General.
- 2010 – Lieutenant-General.
- 2011 – General.

Military offices
Preceded by Constantin Croitoru	Chief of the Romanian Air Force Staff; 2009–2011	Succeeded by Fănică Cârnu
