= Tudor Vladimirescu Division =

Tudor Vladimirescu Division Divizia "Tudor Vladimirescu"
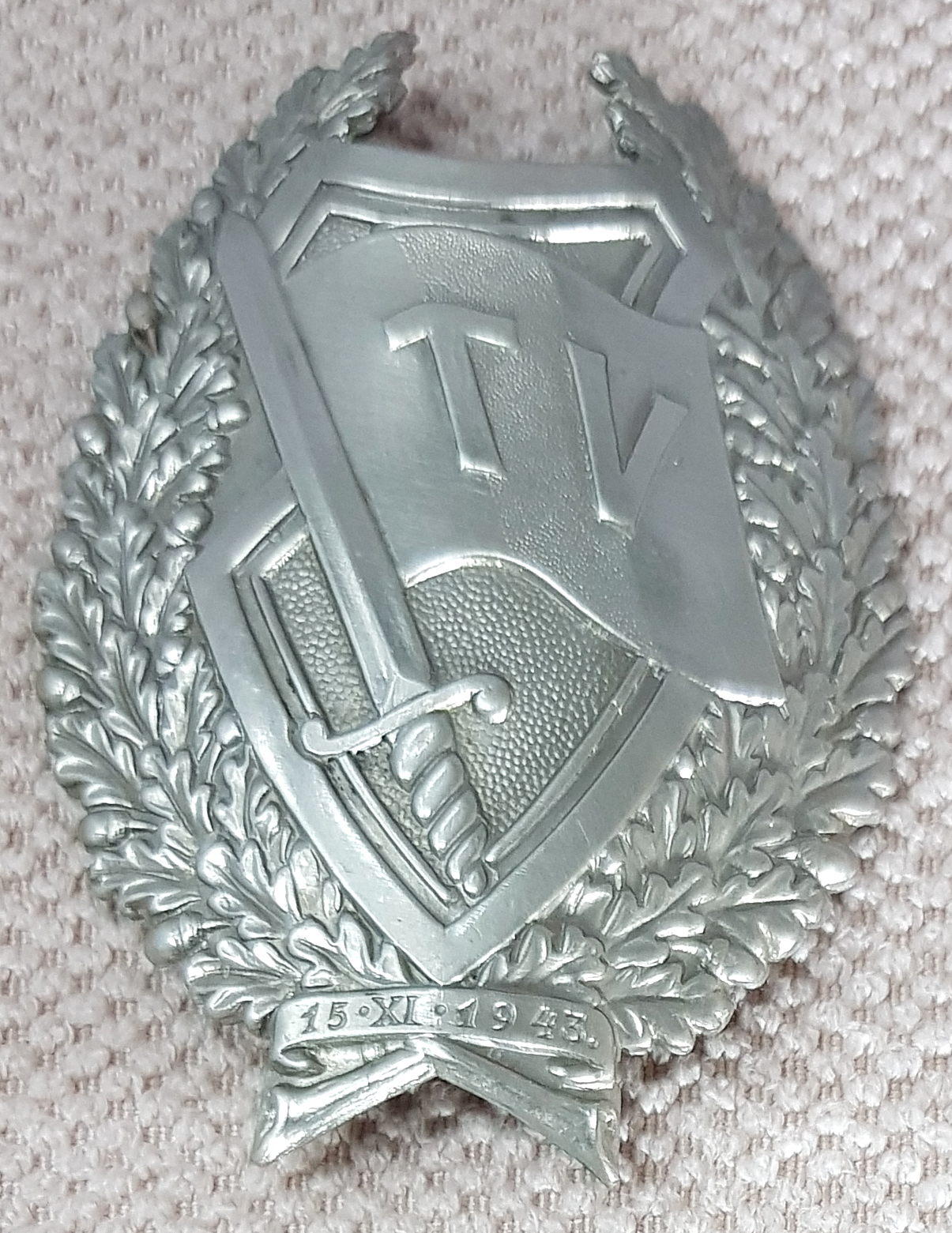
- Active: 15 November 1943–15 August 1945
- Country: Romania; formation equipped and supplied by Soviet Union
- Branch: (Soviet Union) Red Army (2nd Ukrainian Front)
- Type: Division
- Size: 9,562 (February 1944)
- Patron: Tudor Vladimirescu
- Engagements: World War II: Battles in Transylvania; Battle of Debrecen; Western Carpathian Offensive
- Battle honours: Renamed Tudor Vladimirescu-Debrețin Division after the Battle of Debrecen; Order of the Red Banner; Order of Michael the Brave (1946)
- Commander: Nicolae Cambrea (1943–1944); Mircea Haupt (1944–1945); Iacob Teclu (1945)

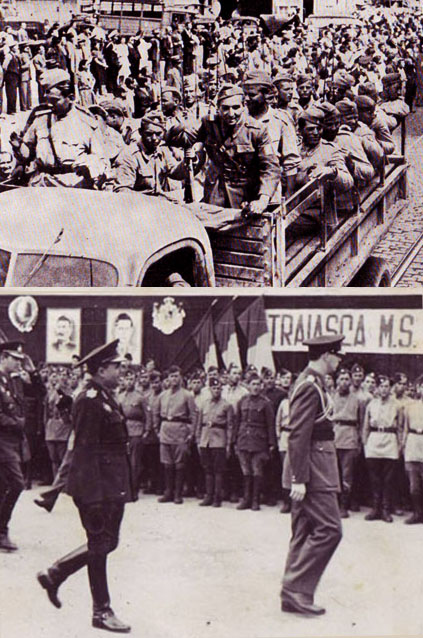
Above: Entry of the Tudor Vladimirescu division in Bucharest in August 1944. Below: King Michael I (right) reviewing the troops with General Nicolae Cambrea.

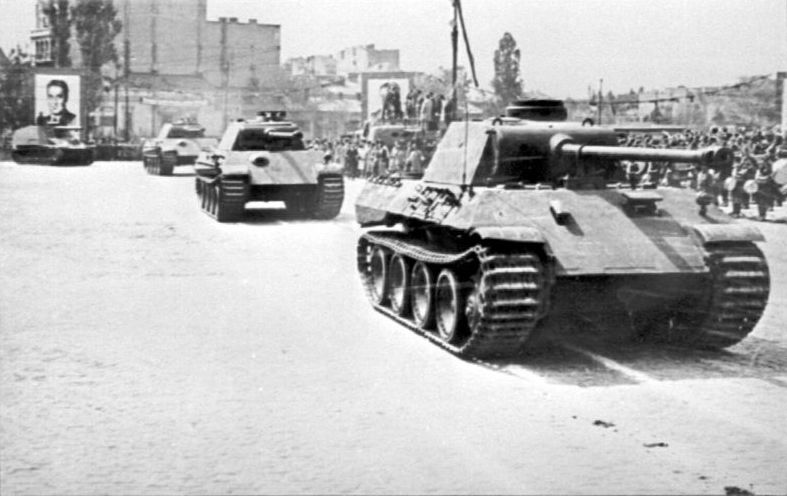
T-V Pantera tanks of the Tudor Vladimirescu division in Bucharest.

The Tudor Vladimirescu Division (full name: Romanian 1st Volunteer Infantry Division 'Tudor Vladimirescu – Debrecen' ) was a Soviet-organised division of Romanians that fought against Germany and Hungary during the final year of World War II.

== Creation ==
Named after Tudor Vladimirescu, the leader of the Wallachian uprising of 1821, the division was formed from Romanian prisoners of war in October 1943, under the command of Brigadier General Nicolae Cambrea.

== Wartime service ==
The division marched into Bucharest on 29 August 1944, as liberators, liberating the city alongside the units of the Romanian Army when Romania left the Axis powers and attacked German troops stationed in the country.

The division, still under Soviet control, saw real combat during the final months of the war in Transylvania, Hungary, and Czechoslovakia, playing a key role in the Soviet seizure of Debrecen, Hungary, in October 1944. Combat losses were heavy; by March 1945 the strength of the division had sunk to 4,436 men.

In March 1945 the division was pulled out of the front lines, but remained under the operational control of the 2nd Ukrainian Front until 15 August 1945.

== Postwar political role ==
In late 1945 the division was reported to have been integrated into the Romanian 4th Army. Relentlessly politicised by their communist leaders, the Tudor Vladimirescu Division became a politically-reliable military formation of the Romanian communists. Along with another Romanian communist unit, the Horea, Cloșca și Crișan Division, and backed by tens of thousands of Red Army troops, the Tudor Vladimirescu Division played a key role in imposing communist rule in Romania after the war. The two communist divisions were integrated into the Romanian Army on 22 August 1945. The Tudor Vladimirescu Division was converted into an armoured division by 1947 while the regular Romanian army was reduced to four divisions with no tanks, thus providing the Romanian communists the trump cards of mobility and firepower had a conflict with anti-communist elements in the Romanian Army taken place.

The Division was converted into the 1st Armored Division in 1947, then 5 Tank Corps, followed by 47 Tank Corps, and finally take the name of 37 Mechanised Division, which became in 1957 a Mechanised Division.

In the 1950s, during the Soviet occupation of Romania, Soviet officers were employed as advisors. Order subunits (battalions, companies) was matched by political officers. After 1956-1957, the youth division officers were assigned to three years in military school or other schools in Sibiu.

== See also ==
- Romania in World War II
- Horea, Cloșca și Crișan Division
- Soviet occupation of Romania
