= Bălcești =

- Town
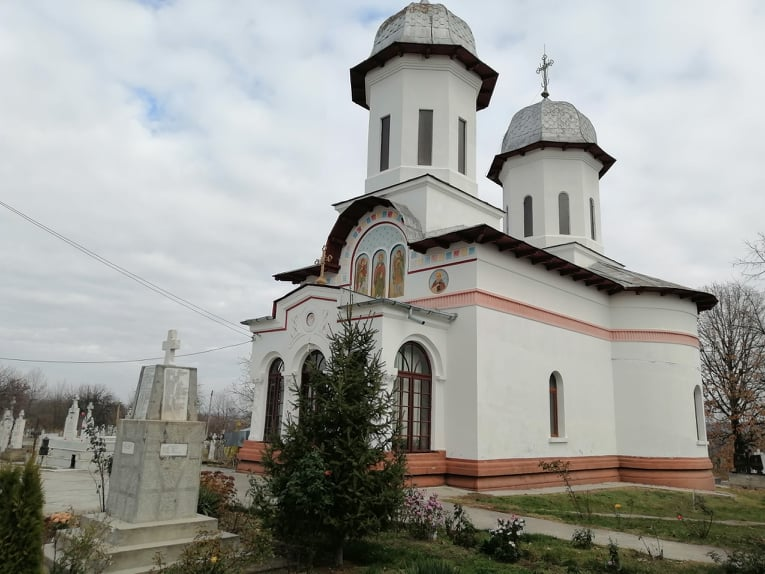
- Church in Gorunești

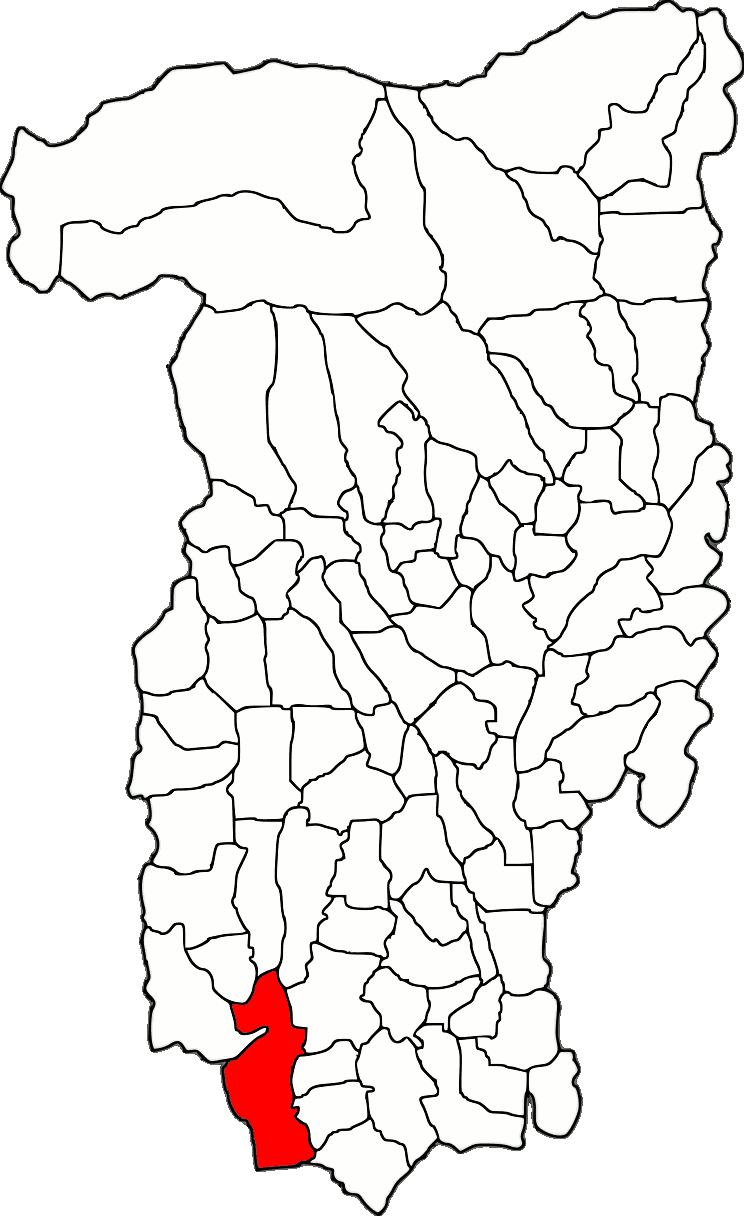
- Location in Vâlcea County

- Location in Romania
- Coordinates: 44.6167°N 23.9394°E
- Country: Romania
- County: Vâlcea

Government
  - Mayor (2024–2028): Constantin Aleca (PNL)
- Area: 98 km^{2} (38 sq mi)
- Elevation: 203 m (666 ft)
- Population (2021-12-01): 4,235
  - Density: 43/km^{2} (110/sq mi)
- Time zone: UTC+02:00 (EET)
  - Summer (DST): UTC+03:00 (EEST)
- Postal code: 245400
- Area code: +(40) 250
- Vehicle reg.: VL
- Website: balcesti.senap.ro

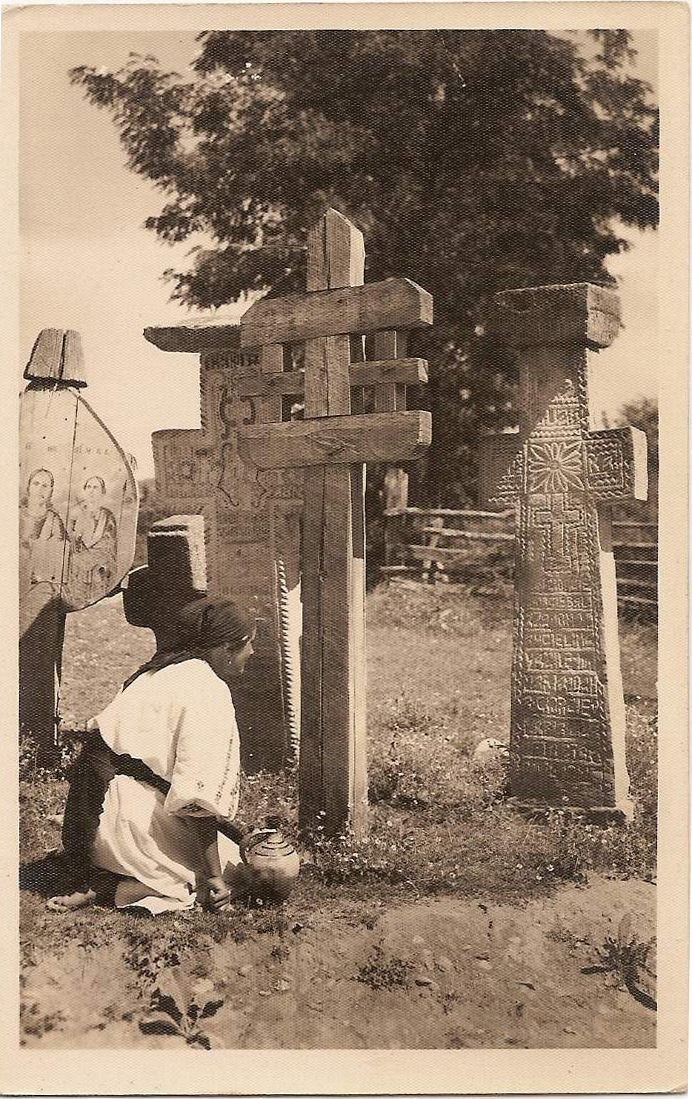
Wayside cross în Bălcești, 1930

Historical population
Year	Pop.	±%
2002	5,780	—
2011	4,613	−20.2%
2021	4,235	−8.2%
Source: Census data

Bălcești is a town located in Vâlcea County, Romania. The town administers eight villages: Benești, Cârlogani, Gorunești, Chirculești, Irimești, Otetelișu, Preoțești, and Satu Poieni. It is situated in the historical region of Oltenia, at the south-western limit of the county, bordering on the Dolj and Olt counties.

The town is on the banks of the river Olteț, which springs from the Căpățânii Mountains and whose course crosses the locality from north to south, on a distance of 21.5 km (13.4 mi). Bălcești is located at an equal distance of about 45 km (28 mi) from the cities of Balș, Drăgășani, and Craiova, and is crossed by the national road DN 65C on a length of 7 km (4.3 mi).

== Notable people ==
- Barbu Bălcescu (1821 or 1825–1884), lawyer and revolutionary
- Gheorghe Catrina (born 1953), general, chief of the Romanian Air Force Staff (2003–2007)
- Petrache Poenaru (1799–1875), inventor
- Ioan Totu (1931–1992), economist and communist politician, Minister of Foreign Affairs (1986–1989)
