= Teodor Frunzeti =

Lieutenant General Teodor Frunzeti (born September 4, 1955, Bucharest) was the chief of the Romanian Land Forces Staff from 3 November 2006 to 17 March 2009.

== Education ==
- "Nicolae Bălcescu" Military Academy, Sibiu - 1977
- National Defense University, Joint Section, Bucharest - 1987
- Military Higher Education Instructors Course, Bucharest - 1991
- Joint Postgraduate Course, Bucharest - 1993
- NATO School, Germany - 1995
- Microcomputer operation course, 1995
- Advanced French Course, Canada - 1995
- PhD in Military Art and Science - 1996
- Advanced English Course, USA - 1997
- US Army Command and General Staff College, USA - 1998
- United Nations Senior management Seminar, New York City and Oslo - 2004
- NATO Defense College, Rome - 2005
- Senior Executive Seminar at the George C. Marshall Center for Security Studies, Germany - 2006
- International Defense Transformation Course at Naval Postgraduate School, Monterey, California, USA - 2006
- PhD in political sciences - 2006
- Associate university professor and PhD coordinator at the National Defense University, Bucharest
- Associate university professor at the "Lucian Blaga" University, Sibiu

He is author and co-author of 13 books related to military activity and also of 114 specialty articles.

== Positions ==
- 1977–1980 - platoon leader at the 1st Mechanized Regiment
- 1980–1985 - instructor at the Patriotic Guards, Bucharest
- 1985–1987 - student-officer of the National Defense University, Bucharest
- 1987–1989 - chief of operations and deputy chief of staff at the 1st Mechanized Regiment
- 1989–1990 - chief of staff at the 452nd Engineer Battalion
- 1990 - staff officer at the Operations Division within the 1st Army Command
- 1990–1998 - lecturer and professor at the National Defense University
- 1998–2000 - university professor, pro-rector and deputy commander of the Land Forces Military Academy, Sibiu
- 2000–2002 - Chief of Defense Strategies Section at J5 Strategic Planning Directorate, General Staff
- 2002–2003 - 33rd Mechanized Brigade commander and 10th Territorial Corps deputy commander
- 2003–2004 - Chief of Training and Doctrine (and Army General Inspector) and Commander of the Land Forces Command
- 2004–2006 - Commander of the "Marshal Alexandru Averescu" 2nd Joint Operational Command
- since November 3, 2006 - Chief of the Land Forces Staff

== Honours ==
=== National honours ===
- (Romania) Romanian Royal Family: 52nd Knight of the Royal Decoration of the Cross of the Romanian Royal House
- (Romania) Romanian Republic: Recipiennt of the Faithful Service Cross

=== Foreign honours ===
- France: Officer of the Order of the Legion of Honour

== Personal life ==
Teodor Frunzeti is married and has one child.

Military offices
Unknown	Chief of the Romanian Land Forces Staff; 2006–2009	Succeeded by Dan Ghica Radu
