= Dan Ghica-Radu =

Lieutenant-general Dan Ghica-Radu (born September 13, 1955 in Topoloveni, Argeș County) was the chief of the Romanian Land Forces Staff from 17 March 2009 to 16 January 2011.

== Education ==
- "Dimitrie Cantemir" Military Highschool, Breaza – 1974
- Nicolae Bălcescu Land Forces Academy, Sibiu – 1977
- Academy of High Military Studies, Faculty of tanks – 1987
- National Defense College – 2002
- NATO Defense College, Rome – 2005

== Commands ==
- 1998-2000: 1st Division's Intelligence office chief
- 2000-03: Chief of Operations office of Land Forces staff
- 2003-04: Commander of 282nd Mechanized Brigade
- 2004-06: Director of Land Forces staff
- 2006-07: Deputy Chief of Operations within Multinational force in Iraq general staff
- 2008-09: Commander of Marshal Alexandru Averescu Joint Operational Command

== Personal life ==
Dan Ghica-Radu is married and has three children.

Military offices
Preceded by Teodor Frunzeti	Chief of the Romanian Land Forces Staff; 2009–2011	Succeeded by Ariton Ioniţă
