= Petre Cameniță =

Petre Cameniță (5 November 1889 – 1962) was a Romanian major-general during World War II.

He was born in Poroina Mare, Mehedinți County in 1889 and graduated the Infantry Military School in 1911 with the rank of second lieutenant. In 1913 he participated in the Second Balkan War, and from 1916 he fought in World War I. From November 1918 to August 1919 he saw combat in the Hungarian–Romanian War. After the war he attended the Higher War School, graduating in 1921. Cameniță was promoted to lieutenant-colonel in 1929 and to colonel in 1935.

On 10 February 1938 he was named prefect of Argeș County. After the assassination of Prime Minister Armand Călinescu on 21 September 1939, he ordered the execution of three members of the Iron Guard from Pitești, whose bodies remained exposed in the Public Garden for two days. Subsequently, he sought to have a bust of Călinescu erected in Pitești, and donated 5,000 lei towards the fund established for this purpose, but the plans were abandoned once the National Legionary State came to power. On 10 September 1940, Cameniță was appointed to lead the General Directorate of Police and State Security by the government of Ion Antonescu. On 10 May 1941, in recognition of the role he played in defeating the Legionnaires' rebellion, Cameniță was promoted to the rank of brigadier general.

From June to September 1941, he was first Commanding Officer 1st Frontier Brigade and fought on the Eastern Front against the Soviet Union. From September 1941 to January 1942 he served as Deputy General Officer Commanding 21st Division. He was Commanding Officer Infantry 1st Guards Division and then Secretary-General to Under-Secretary of State of Land Forces in 1942. After the coup d'état of 23 August 1944, Romania switched sides and declared war on Nazi Germany. From September 1944 to January 1945 Cameniță served as General Officer Commanding the 18th Infantry Division. On 19 October 1944 he was promoted to major general. In 1945, he was first General Officer Commanding VI Corps and then General Officer Commanding 18th Division. Cameniță retired în March 1945. His awards include the Order of the Star of Romania, Officer rank, and the Order of St. Sava, 3rd grade.
