= Constantin Croitoru =

Chief of the Romanian Air Force Staff

- Born: 5 May 1952 (age 74); Dițești, Prahova Region, Romanian People's Republic
- Military career
- Allegiance: Romania
- Branch: Romanian Air Force
- Service years: 1974–2009
- Rank: Lieutenant General
- Commands: Chief of Staff of the Romanian Air Force

General locotenent Constantin Croitoru (born 5 May 1952 in Dițești, Prahova County) was the Chief of the Romanian Air Force Staff until 30 January 2009.

He was discharged by the Minister of National Defense, Mihai Stănișoară, after it was discovered that various weapons were missing from a military depot near Ciorogârla, Ilfov County.

== Military career ==
He joined the military in 1974 after graduating from the Air Force Military School. He attended the courses of the Academy of High Military Studies from 1981 to 1983. After graduation, he was appointed Chief Instructor of the 70th Air Division. During his career, he was also assigned as air base and air division commander at the Air Operational Command, Chief of Operations Directorate, and Deputy Director of the General Staff. His most recent appointment was as Director of the General Directorate for Defense Intelligence.

Croitoru has considerable flight experience; he has lodged some 1,500 flying hours on a variety of aircraft, including MiG-15, MiG-21 LanceR, MiG-29, and IAR 316.

== Personal life ==
Constantin Croitoru is married and has a son.

== Education ==
- Air Force Military School, 1974
- Military Academy, Air Force and Air defense Branch, 1983
- Brigade/Regiment Commander Course, 1993
- Improvement Course for Strategic Operation Management, 1996
- National Defense College, 2001
- English language advanced course, Canada, 2002
- Teaching Personnel Training Course, Bucharest, 2006

== Appointments ==
- 1974-1984 – pilot, chief pilot and patrol leader, 57th Fighter Regiment
- 1984-1990 – Chief Instructor, 70th Air Division
- 1990-1994 – staff officer, Methodical Training Office, Air Force and Air Defense Staff
- 1994-1995 – Deputy Commander, responsible for flying operations, 70th Air Division
- 1995-1998 – Deputy Commander, responsible for flying operations, 1st Air Corps "Siret"
- 1998-2000 – Deputy Chief, Doctrine and Training, Air Force Staff
- 2000-2001 – Chief of Staff, 1st Air Division "Siret"
- 2001-2002 – Commander of the 90th Airlift Base
- 2002-2003 – Commander of the 1st Air Division
- 2003-2005 – Commander Main Air Operational Command
- 2005-2006 – Deputy Director General Staff
- 2006-2007 – Director of the General Directorate for Defense Intelligence
- March 2007-January 2009 – Chief of Air Force Staff

== Promotions ==
- 1977 – Second Lieutenant
- 1978 – Lieutenant
- 1981 - Captain
- 1986 – Major
- 1990 – Lieutenant Colonel
- 1994 – Colonel
- 2001 – Brigadier General
- 2004 – Major General
- 2006 – Lieutenant General

Military offices
Preceded by Gheorghe Catrina	Chief of the Romanian Air Force Staff; 2007–2009	Succeeded by Ion-Aurel Stanciu
