= Marian Chițu =

Romanian footballer

Personal information
- Full name: Marian Adrian Chițu
- Date of birth: 19 August 1986 (age 40)
- Place of birth: Timișoara, Romania
- Height: 1.69 m (5 ft 6 1/2 in)
- Positions: Left back; winger

Senior career*
Years	Team	Apps	(Gls)
2006–2011	Politehnica Timișoara	4	(0)
2008	→ Buftea (loan)	15	(3)
2009	→ Gloria Buzău (loan)	14	(1)
2010–2011	→ Concordia Chiajna (loan)	27	(5)
2011–2012	Concordia Chiajna	9	(0)
2013–2014	Gloria Bistrița	35	(3)
2014–2015	Săgeata Năvodari	11	(1)
2015	Academica Argeș	4	(1)
2015	Metalul Reșița	15	(0)
2016	Dunărea Călărași	9	(0)
2016	Berceni	7	(0)
Total		150	(14)
- * Club domestic league appearances and goals as of 17 November 2016

Marian Adrian Chițu (born 19 August 1986) is a Romanian former football player.

== Poli Timișoara ==
- He was promoted to first team in the Winters of year 2010 where he waited for his dream debut in Liga I for FC Timișoara.
- Finally, on 5 March he was announced in "First Eleven" (11) match against Rapid București.

== Concordia Chiajna ==
- On 4 August 2010 he was loaned to Liga II team Concordia Chiajna.
