= Petre Antonescu (general) =

Romanian brigadier general

Petre Antonescu (October 25, 1891 in Pitești – December 8, 1957 in Bucharest) was a Romanian brigadier general during World War II.

After attending the Artillery Military School in Bucharest (1911–1913), he graduated with the rank of second lieutenant. After World War I, Antonescu pursued his studies at the Higher War School (1921–1923). He was promoted to lieutenant colonel in 1933 and to colonel in 1938.

In 1941, he became General-Secretary of the Ministry of Defense. He was promoted to brigadier general in 1943. He served as the Chief of Staff, 4th Army, from 1943 to 1944. From 1944 to 1945, he was the General Officer Commanding the 1st Guard Division, the artillery commander of the 4th Army, and finally the commander of the 21st Division. He went into reserve in 1945.

== Awards and honors ==
- Officer of the Order of the Star of Romania (8 June 1940).
- Commander of the Order of the Crown of Romania (9 May 1941).
