= Gheorghe Cosma =

Romanian general

Gheorghe Cosma (February 22, 1892–July 1, 1969) was a Romanian major general during World War II.

Cosma was born in Pogana, Tutova County, in the historical region Moldavia (now in Vaslui County). He graduated from the Artillery Officers School in 1914 with the rank of second lieutenant. He served during the Romanian Campaign of World War I and was promoted to lieutenant in 1916 and captain in 1917. In 1924 he graduated from the Higher War School and was promoted to major. He advanced in rank to lieutenant colonel in 1934 and colonel in 1938.

He pursued his career in 1940 as Chief of Staff Higher Technical Department. In 1941, he served as Commanding Officer 6th Artillery Regiment and Chief of Staff Higher Technical Department. After Romania entered World War II on the side of the Axis powers, Cosma participated in the Siege of Odessa. He was Commanding Officer 9th Artillery Brigade in 1942, and took part in the Battle of Stalingrad. In 1943 was Commanding Officer 13th Artillery Brigade and General Officer Commanding Artillery VII Corps. In March 1944 he was promoted to brigadier general.

On August 24, 1944, the day after King Michael's Coup, Cosma was taken prisoner of war by the Red Army at Târgu Neamț. Held in captivity at Bistricioara, he was set free a month later, and he returned to serve as General Officer Commanding Artillery Mountain Corps in the struggle against Nazi Germany. In 1945, he was General Officer Commanding Artillery 4th Army, General Officer Commanding 18th Division, General Officer Commanding 19th Division, and Commandant Artillery Instruction Center.

Cosma went into reserve in August 1946, was promoted to major general in April 1947, and retired in August 1947. In 1955 he was tried at the Military Tribunal in Iași by the Communist authorities for his role on the Eastern Front; Cosma was found not guilty and was acquitted. He died in Bucharest on July 1, 1969.
