= Gheorghe Catrina =

- Born: 30 October 1953 (age 72); Bălceşti, Vâlcea County
- Military career
- Allegiance: Romania
- Branch: Romanian Air Force
- Service years: 1975–present
- Rank: General
- Commands: Chief of Staff of the Romanian Air Force

General Gheorghe Catrina (born 30 October 1953, in Bălceşti, Vâlcea County) was the chief of the Romanian Air Force Staff until 12 March 2007.

== Military career ==
He joined the Air Force in 1975 after graduating the Air Force Officers School. He climbed step by step the career ladder from the lower ranks to reach today's position, performing duties as a fighter pilot, chief pilot, and various command positions in several Air Force bases.

EDUCATION: Air Force Officer School, 1975; Academy of Advanced Military Studies, 1983; Post-academic Course for Regiment Commanders, 1988; English Course, 1996; National Defense College, Bucharest, 1998; Industrial College of Armed Forces, National defense University, USA, between 2000 and 2001; Degree of Master of Science in National Resource Strategy, National Defense University, USA 2001; Advanced Course on National and International Security, 2002; PhD in Military Science, 2006

He attended courses of the Academy of Advanced Military Studies between 1981 and 1983. Upon graduating from the academy, he was assigned navigator in a fighter-bomber regiment. He also was appointed as navigator and deputy commander for flight operation nd commander, Air Force Regiment between 1983 and 1989; deputy commander for flight operation, Air Division between 1989 and 1994; deputy commander for operations, commander-Air Force and deputy chief of staff-Air Force and Air Defense Staff between 1994 and 2000; student Industrial College of Armed Forces, National defense University, USA (1 year); student Degree of Master of Science in National Resource Strategy, National Defense University, USA between 2000 and 2001; commander, Air Division between 2001 and 2002; commander, Air Operational Command between 2002 and 2003

1 August 2003 – 12 March 2007, Chief of Romanian Air Force Staff

Commander of Air Division and Air Operational Command between 2001 and 2003.

In August 2003 General Catrina was appointed the Chief of the Romanian Air Force Staff.

He is member of The Hall of Fame International Fellows, National Defence University, Washington DC, USA

On 12 March 2007, he was discharged from active duty and promoted to the rank of General by President Traian Băsescu.

== Personal life ==
He is married and has two children, a son and a daughter.

Military offices
Unknown	Chief of the Romanian Air Force Staff; 2003–2007	Succeeded by Constantin Croitoru
