= Ilie Antonescu =

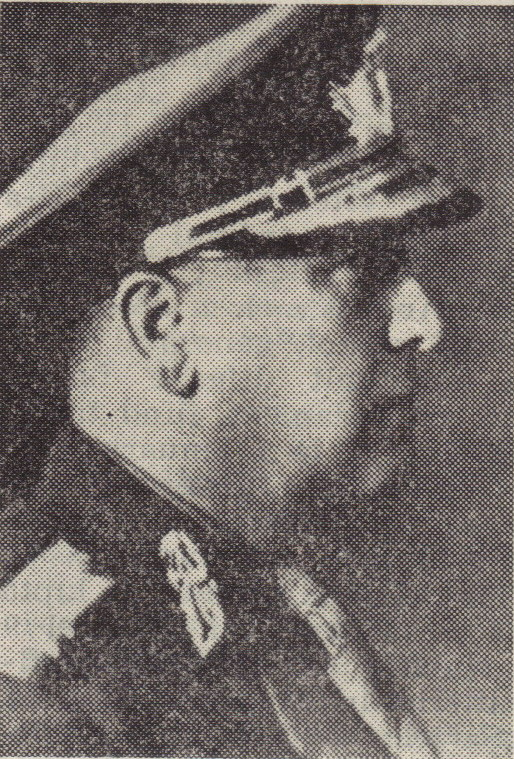
Ilie Antonescu

Ilie Antonescualso known as Ilie Caldarariu (19 February 1894–22 November 1974) was a major general of the Romanian Armed Forces during World War II.

Antonescu was born in Turnu Severin, in the western part of the historical region of Oltenia. He became a Commanding Officer 6th Călărași Cavalry Regiment in 1941, and moved to the 55th Exploration Group and then to the 6th Călărași Cavalry Regiment that year. In 1942, he served as the Romanian Liaison Officer to Army Group South, the Chief 4th Section forward echelons General Headquarter, and the Chief of Staff 5th Corps Area. He was Deputy General Officer Commanding 5th Cavalry Division in 1943, and in 1944 became General Officer Commanding 5th Training Cavalry Division, then General Officer Commanding 5th Cavalry Division, and finally Assistant Inspector-General of Cavalry. He commanded the 9th Cavalry Division in 1944, and spent 1945–1948 in reserve. Antonescu retired in 1948.

His awards include the Order of the Star of Romania, Officer class (June 8, 1940) and the Order of Michael the Brave, 3rd class (August 4, 1945).
