= Vasile Chițu =

Romanian general

Vasile Chițu (July 28, 1896 – August 7, 1968) was a Romanian brigadier general during World War II.

He advanced in rank to lieutenant colonel in 1934, and to colonel in 1939. In June 1940 he was awarded the Order of the Star of Romania, Officer class. From September 1941 to May 1944, Chițu served as Chief of Staff of the 7th Corps Area. He was promoted to brigadier general in March 1944. Later that year he was General Officer commanding the 1st Infantry Training Division. He retired in September 1944.
