= Ion Constantinescu =

- Born: 15 June 1896
- Military career
- Allegiance: Kingdom of Romania
- Branch: Army
- Rank: Brigadier general

Ion Constantinescu (born 15 June 1896, date of death unknown) was a Romanian brigadier general during World War II.

== Military career ==
Constantinescu advanced in rank to lieutenant colonel in 1937 and to colonel in May 1941. From February 1941, he was commandant of the Regimental Instruction Center for Mechanization, and from April 1942 he was the commanding officer of the 35th Regiment. In 1944, Constantinescu first served as the commanding officer of the 21st Brigade and then deputy general officer commanding the 21st Division. He was inspector of the 2nd Corps area in 1945, was promoted to brigadier general in June 1946, and went into the reserve two months later. He retired in August 1947.
