= Constantinesco (automobile) =

Romanian automobile

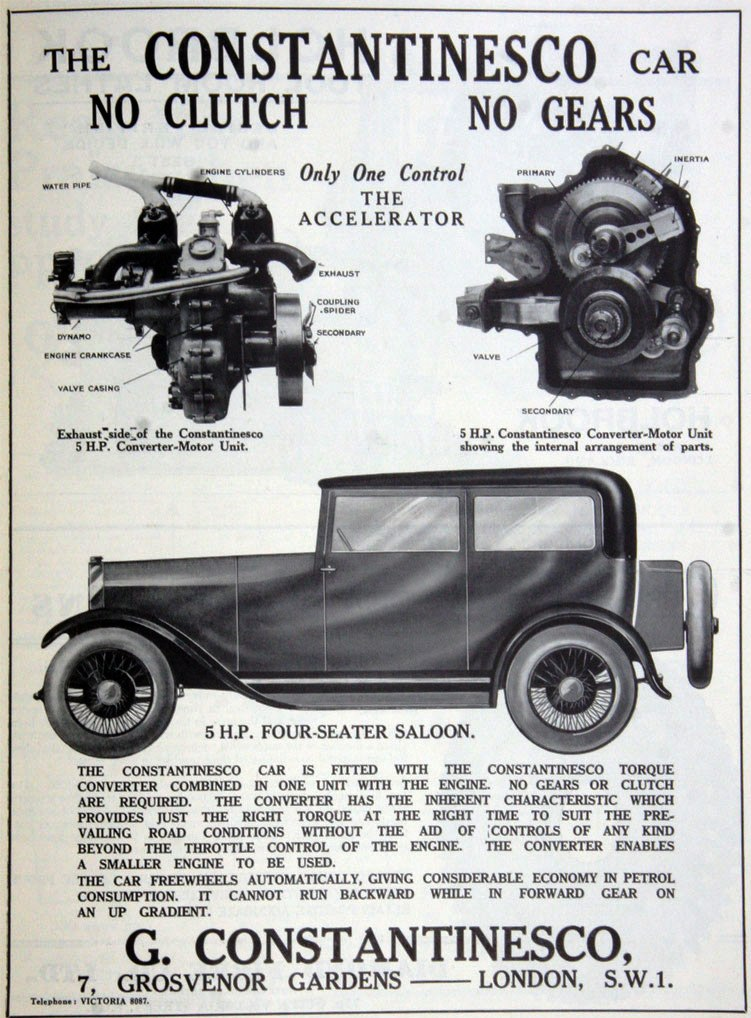
Constantinesco automobile advertisement

The Constantinesco was a Romanian automobile produced from 1926 to 1928. It was built by George Constantinescu, a Romanian-born engineer and inventor, who had gained fame by his invention of an improved version of a machine gun synchronization gear (a device allowing aircraft-mounted machine guns to fire through the propeller without striking the blades themselves) that replaced the clumsy mechanical linkages that had been previously employed with a hydrostatic device based on his own novel theory of sonics, or "wave transmission".

== Mechanical torque converter ==
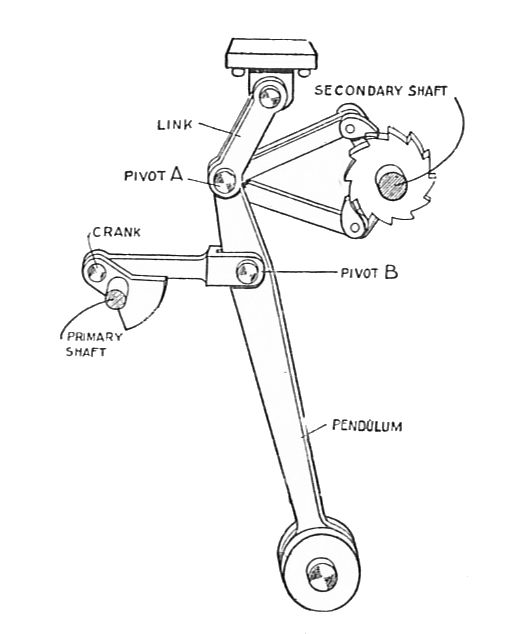
Diagrammatic representation of the torque converter

The inspiration behind the car was Constantinescu's 1923 invention of the "oscillating masses" mechanical torque converter, which replaced clumsy gear shifting with a smooth, highly efficient, continuously variable transmission. The transmission ratio was determined by the oscillation of a pendulum, the extent of the oscillations being determined by the pendulum's mass, ingenious attachment, and dimensions in combination with the torque and speed of the engine and the road wheels. An oscillating masses torque converter was used to eliminate the need for a complex geared automotive transmissions which were heavy, required shifting gears, and could be inefficient. Compared to a similar car with a gear based transmission, Constantinesco needed a substantially smaller engine, was lighter overall, and was more fuel efficient. In the car, the mechanical torque converter was embodied in a 494 cc twin-cylinder two-stroke engine of his own design, where it was mounted between the engine's cylinders.

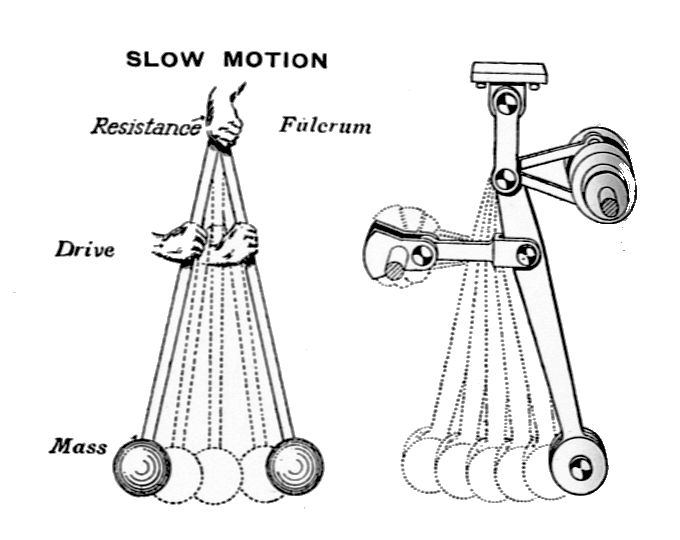
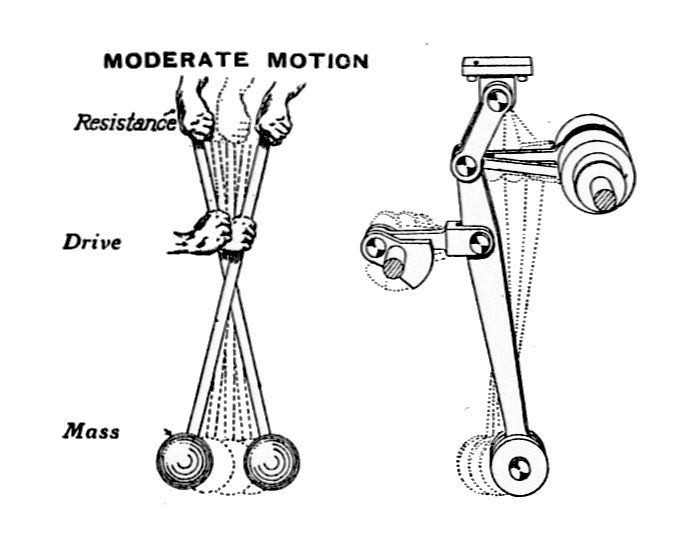
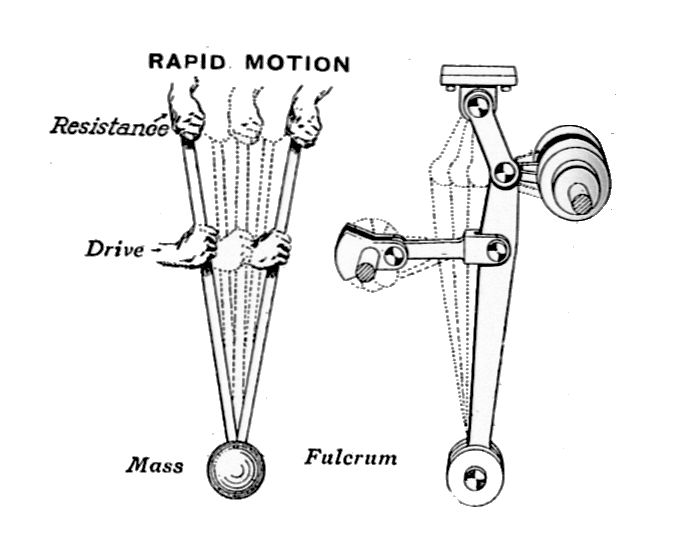
The torque converter at different speeds

== Demise ==
The car was built in Paris with the gearbox (on the rear axle for forward, neutral and reverse) built in England. It was exhibited at the 1926 Paris Motor Show but only a few were made. General Motors signed a "lucrative" royalty agreement to manufacture the torque converters, giving Constantinesco a $100,000 advance on royalties, but didn't make any, leaving the inventor deeply in debt and the mechanical torque converter sidelined.
