= Ioan Beldiceanu =

Romanian general

- Born: November 13, 1892
- Died: 6 February 1982 (aged 89)
- Military career
- Allegiance: Kingdom of Romania
- Branch: Romanian Land Forces
- Rank: Major General
- Commands: 101st Mountain Command; 1st Mountain Division
- Conflicts: World War II; Battle of Turda

Ioan Beldiceanu (13 November 1892 – 6 February 1982) was a Romanian brigadier general during World War II.

He advanced in rank to lieutenant-colonel (1933) and colonel (1938). He was head adjutant section general staff from June 1941 to March 1942 and commanding officer, Infantry Guards Division in March–December 1942. He was deputy general officer commanding 1st Armored Division from December 1942 to October 1943. In March 1943, Beldiceanu was promoted to brigadier general and was general officer commanding 101st Mountain Command from October 1943 to September 1944.

After the coup d'état of 23 August 1944, Romania switched sides and declared war on Nazi Germany. From 5 September 1944 to 6 February 1945 he was general officer commanding the Vânători de munte 1st Mountain Division. In September 1944, Beldiceanu fought with his division at Sfântu Gheorghe and Târgu Mureș, during the Battle of Turda. He was promoted to major general after the war (effective 23 August 1944), and retired în August 1947.
