= Nicolae Costescu =

Romanian general

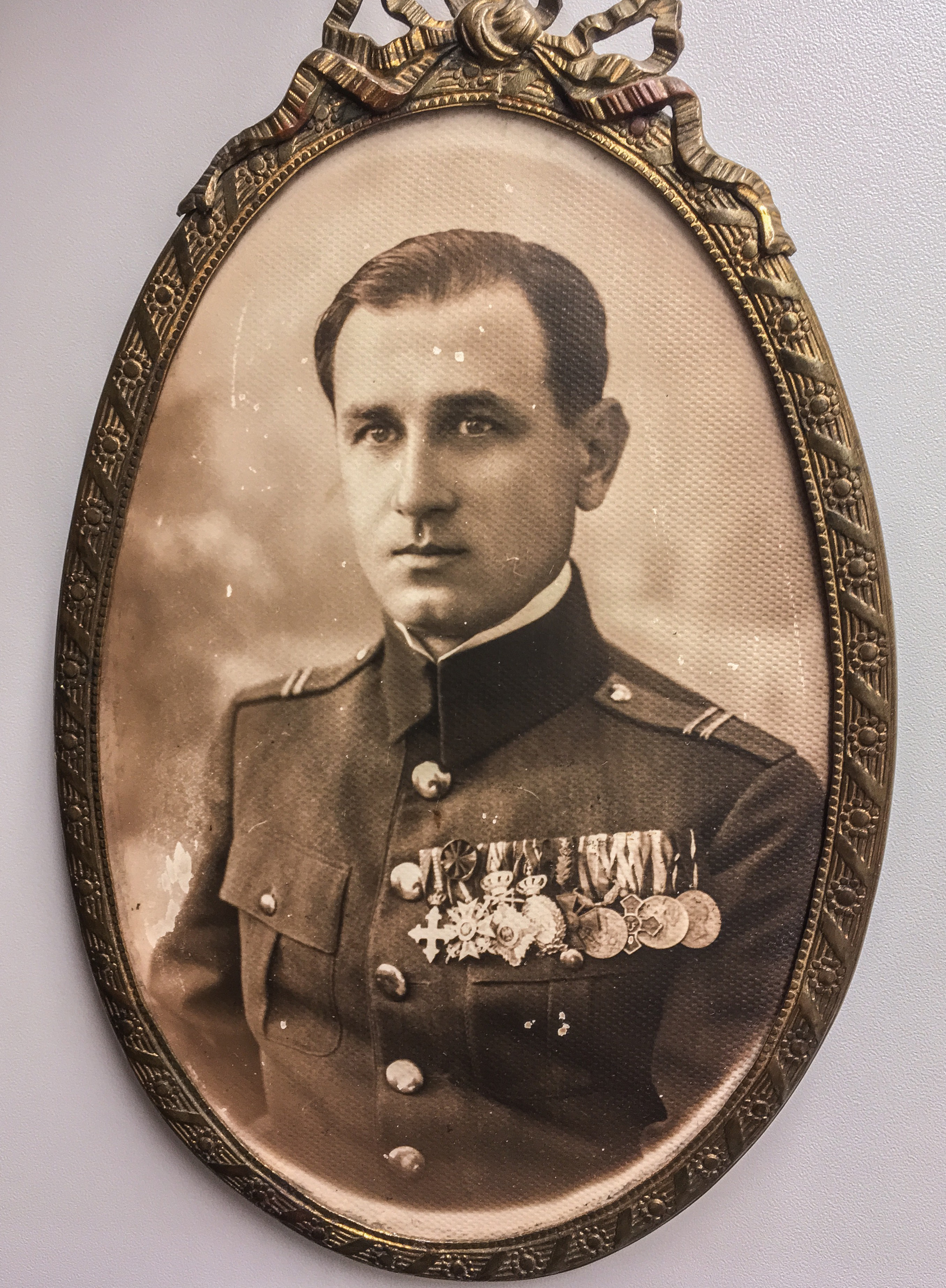
Nicolae Costescu, with decorations earned in World War I

Nicolae Costescu (5 February 1888 – 10 December 1963) was a Romanian brigadier general during World War II.

After Romania entered World War I in 1916, he fought in the Romanian Campaign. After the war, Costescu advanced in rank to lieutenant colonel in 1926, to colonel in 1933, and to brigadier general in 1939. In June 1940 he was awarded the Order of the Crown, Commander rank.

From January to September 1941, he served as Director of the Infantry Directorate in the Under-Secretariat of State for the Romanian Land Forces. On 10 September 1941, Costescu was named General Officer Commanding the 18th Infantry Division. His division was sent to the Eastern Front to reinforce the Wehrmacht's XXXXII Army Corps. He commanded the 18th Division during the Crimean Campaign and the Siege of Sevastopol until January 1942. Upon returning to Romania, he served again as Director of the Infantry Directorate until July 1942, when he was put into retirement. In 1946 he was promoted to major general (reserve).
