= Nicolae Cambrea =

Romanian general

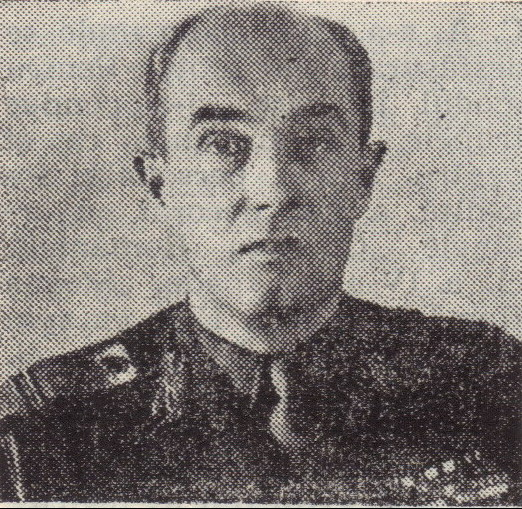
Nicolae Cambrea

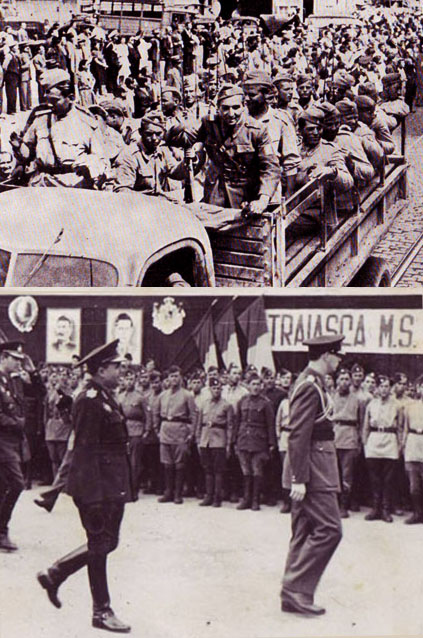
Above: Entry of the Tudor Vladimirescu division in Bucharest in August 1944. Below: King Michael I (right) reviewing the troops with General Cambrea.

Nicolae Cambrea (5 April 1899 – 5 February 1976) was a Romanian brigadier general during World War II.

He was born in Târgu Jiu, Gorj County, the son of the city's police chief. After his father's death in 1916, during the German occupation of Târgu Jiu in World War I, he volunteered to serve in the Romanian Army. He remained in the army after the war, advancing in rank as officer. In 1942, he served as Chief of Staff 5th Division. He was briefly a Soviet prisoner of war, but the following year joined his captors and became General Officer Commanding of the Tudor Vladimirescu Division, which earned him the nickname "Red General".

After the war he was Vice Chief General Staff in 1945, Deputy General Officer Commanding 2nd Military Region in 1947, Commandant Army Instruction Center in 1948, and General Officer Commanding 3rd Military Region in 1949. Cambrea retired in 1950. In August 1969, he was promoted to colonel general in the reserves. In 1964, he was awarded the Order of the Star of the Romanian People's Republic, 2nd class.
