= Romania in World War II =

The Kingdom of Romania, under the rule of King Carol II, initially maintained neutrality in World War II. However, fascist political forces, especially the Iron Guard, rose in popularity and power, urging an alliance with Nazi Germany and its allies. As the military fortunes of Romania's two main guarantors of territorial integrity—France and Britain—crumbled in the Battle of France, the government of Romania turned to Germany in hopes of a similar guarantee, unaware that Germany, in the supplementary protocol to the 1939 Molotov–Ribbentrop Pact, had already granted its permission to Soviet claims on Romanian territory.

In the summer of 1940, the USSR occupied Bessarabia and Northern Bukovina, severely weakening Romania and diminishing its international standing. Taking advantage of the situation, Hungary and Bulgaria both pressed territorial claims on Romania. The disputes, arbitrated by Germany and Italy, led to the further losses of Northern Transylvania and Southern Dobruja to Hungary and Bulgaria respectively. The popularity of the Romanian government plummeted, further reinforcing fascist and military factions, who eventually staged a coup in September 1940 that turned the country into a Legionary State under Mareșal Ion Antonescu in partnership with the Iron Guard. Romania officially joined the Axis powers on 23 November 1940. Antonescu assumed full control over Romania in January 1941 and invaded the Soviet Union with the Axis, providing equipment and oil to Germany and committing more troops to the Eastern Front than all other allies of Germany combined. Romanian forces played a large role during fighting in Ukraine, Bessarabia, and in the Battle of Stalingrad. Romanian troops were responsible for the persecution and massacre of 260,000 Jews in Romanian-controlled territories, though half of the Jews living in Romania survived the war. Romania controlled the third-largest Axis army in Europe and the fourth largest Axis army in the world.

The Allies bombed Romania heavily from 1943 onwards, and during the Battle of Romania, Soviet armies occupied the country in 1944. Popular support for Romania's participation in the war faltered, and the German–Romanian fronts collapsed under the Soviet onslaught. King Michael of Romania engineered the 1944 Romanian coup d'état that deposed the Antonescu regime and put Romania on the side of the Allies for the remainder of the war. Despite this late association with the victors, Greater Romania was not restored, except for Northern Transylvania from Hungary.

== Background ==
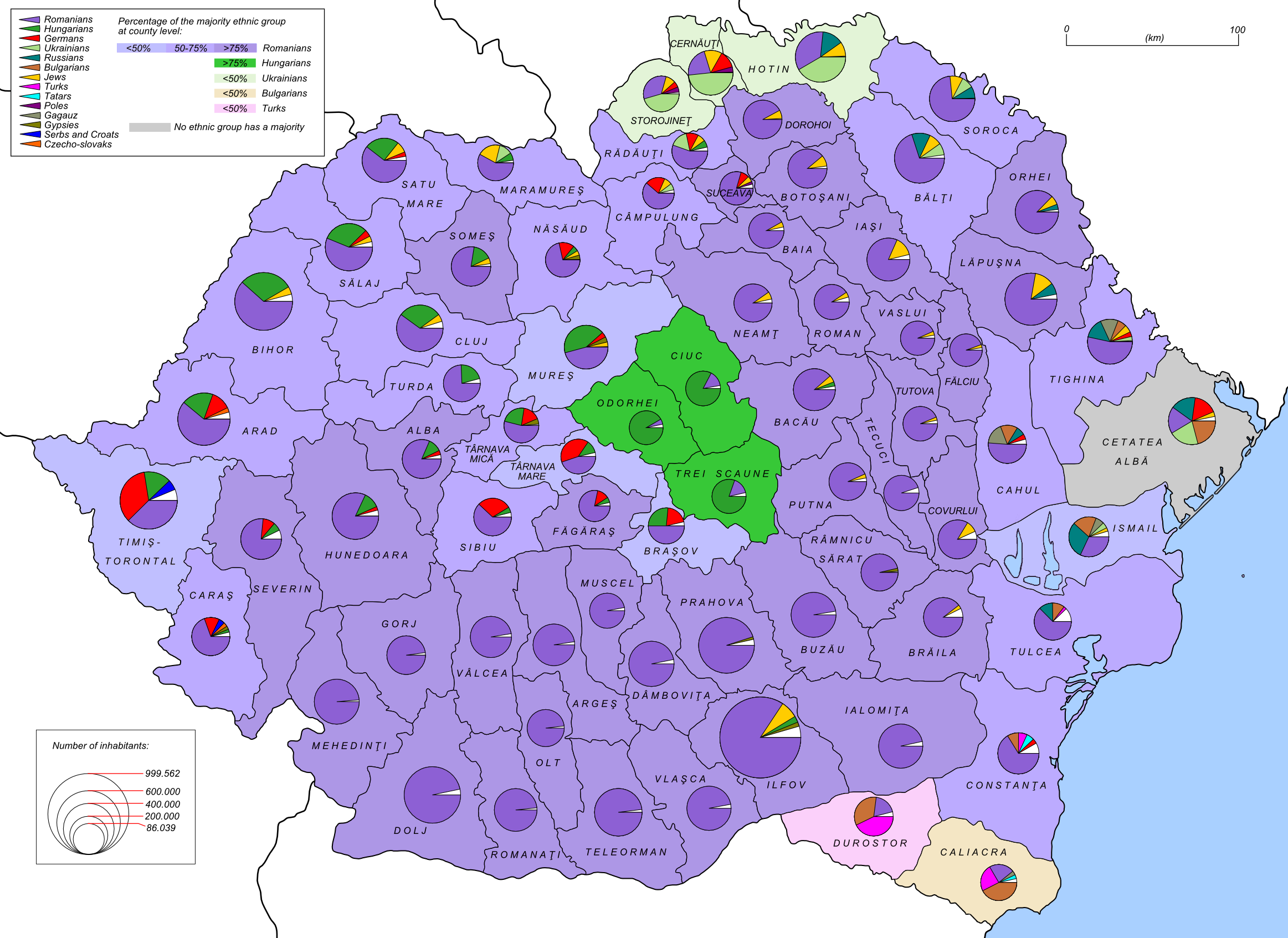
Ethnic map of Greater Romania according to the 1930 Romanian census. Sizeable ethnic minorities put Romania at odds with Hungary, Bulgaria, and the Soviet Union throughout the interwar period.

In the aftermath of World War I, Romania, which fought alongside the Entente powers against the Central Powers, had greatly expanded its territory, incorporating the regions of Transylvania, Bessarabia and Bukovina, largely as a result of the vacuum created by the collapse of the Austro-Hungarian and Russian empires. This led to the achievement of the long-standing nationalist goal of creating a "Greater Romania", a national state that would incorporate all ethnic Romanians. However, the newly gained territories also included significant Hungarian, German, Bulgarian, Ukrainian, and Russian minorities, which put Romania at odds with several of her neighbours. This occasionally led to violent conflicts, as exemplified by the Hungarian–Romanian War and the Tatarbunary Uprising. To contain Hungarian irredentism, Romania, Yugoslavia and Czechoslovakia established the Little Entente in 1921. That same year Romania and Poland concluded a defensive alliance against the emergent Soviet Union, and in 1934 the Balkan Entente was formed with Yugoslavia, Greece and Turkey, which were suspicious of Bulgaria.

Since the late 19th century onwards Romania had been a relatively democratic constitutional monarchy with a pro-Western outlook, but the country faced increasing turmoil in the 1930s as a result of the Great Depression in Romania and the rise of fascist movements such as the Iron Guard, which advocated revolutionary terrorism against the state. Under the pretext of stabilizing the country, the increasingly autocratic King Carol II proclaimed a 'royal dictatorship' in 1938. The new regime featured corporatist policies that often resembled those of Fascist Italy and Nazi Germany. In parallel with these internal developments, economic pressures and a weak Franco-British response to Hitler's aggressive foreign policy caused Romania to start drifting away from the Western Allies and closer to the Axis.

On 13 April 1939, France and the United Kingdom had pledged to guarantee the independence of the Kingdom of Romania. Negotiations with the Soviet Union concerning a similar guarantee collapsed when Romania refused to allow the Red Army to cross its frontiers.

On 23 August 1939, Germany and the Soviet Union signed the Molotov–Ribbentrop Pact. Among other things, this recognized in a secret annex the Soviet "interest" in Bessarabia (which had been ruled by the Russian Empire from 1812 to 1918). This Soviet interest was combined with a clear indication that there was an explicit lack of any German interest in the area.

Eight days later Nazi Germany invaded the Second Polish Republic. Expecting military aid from Britain and France, Poland chose not to execute its alliance with Romania in order to be able to use the Romanian Bridgehead. Romania officially remained neutral and, under pressure from the Soviet Union and Germany, interned the fleeing Polish government after its members had crossed the Polish–Romanian border on 17 September, forcing them to relegate their authority to what became the Polish government-in-exile. After the assassination of Romanian Prime Minister Armand Călinescu on 21 September, King Carol II tried to maintain neutrality for several months longer, but the surrender of the Third French Republic and the retreat of British forces from continental Europe rendered the assurances that both countries had made to Romania meaningless.

Romania after the territorial losses of 1940. The recovery of Bessarabia and Northern Bukovina was the catalyst for Romania's entry into the war on Germany's side.

In 1940 Romania's territorial gains made following World War I were largely undone. In July, after a Soviet ultimatum, Romania agreed to give up Bessarabia and northern Bukovina (the Soviets also annexed the city of Hertsa, which was not stated in the ultimatum). Two-thirds of Bessarabia were combined with a small part of the Soviet Union to form the Moldavian Soviet Socialist Republic. The rest (northern Bukovina, the northern half of Hotin county and Budjak) was apportioned to the Ukrainian Soviet Socialist Republic.

Shortly thereafter, on 30 August, under the Second Vienna Award, Germany and Italy mediated a compromise between Romania and the Kingdom of Hungary: Hungary received a region referred to as 'Northern Transylvania', while 'Southern Transylvania' remained part of Romania (Hungary had lost Transylvania after World War I in the Treaty of Trianon). On 7 September, under the Treaty of Craiova, Southern Dobruja (which Bulgaria had lost after the Romanian invasion during the Second Balkan War in 1913), was ceded to Bulgaria under pressure from Germany. Despite the relatively recent acquisition of these territories, those were inhabited by a majority of Romanian speaking people (except Southern Dobruja), so the Romanians had seen them as historically belonging to Romania, and the fact that so much land was lost without a fight shattered the underpinnings of King Carol's power.

However, these cessions of territory to Hungary and Bulgaria did earn Romania a German guarantee of its remaining land. This guarantee was successfully put to test a few months later. On 13 November 1940, Vyacheslav Molotov asked Hitler to endorse the Soviet annexation of South Bukovina. This was equivalent to Germany cancelling its guarantee of Romania, something obviously unacceptable to Berlin. As the Final Report of the Wiesel Commission put it: "Only Hitler's refusal saved the rest of Bukovina from being swallowed up, Russified, and lost to Romania forever.".

On 4 July, Ion Gigurtu formed the first Romanian government to include an Iron Guardist minister, Horia Sima. Sima was a particularly virulent antisemite who had become the nominal leader of the movement after the death of Corneliu Codreanu. He was one of the few prominent far-right leaders to survive the bloody infighting and government suppression of the preceding years.

== Antonescu comes to power ==
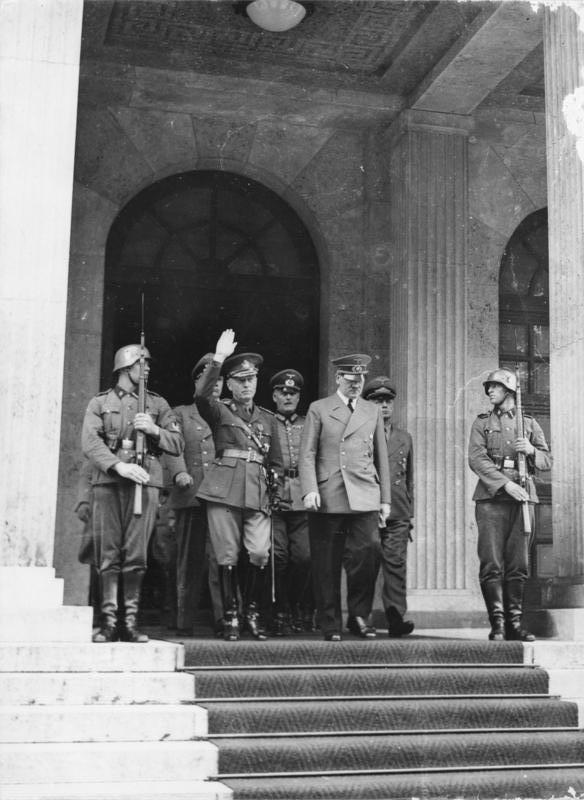
Antonescu and Adolf Hitler at the Führerbau in Munich (June 1941).

In the immediate wake of the loss of Northern Transylvania, on 4 September 1940, the Iron Guard (led by Horia Sima) and General (later Marshal) Ion Antonescu united to form the "National Legionary State", which forced the abdication of Carol II in favor of his 19-year-old son Michael. Carol and his mistress Magda Lupescu went into exile, and Romania, despite the unfavorable outcome of recent territorial disputes, leaned strongly toward the Axis. As part of the deal, the Iron Guard became the sole legal party in Romania. Antonescu became the Iron Guard's honorary leader, while Sima became deputy premier.

In power, the Iron Guard stiffened the already harsh anti-Semitic legislation, enacted legislation directed against minority businessmen, tempered at times by the willingness of officials to take bribes, and wreaked vengeance upon its enemies. On 8 October 1940 German troops began crossing into Romania. They soon numbered over 500,000.

On 23 November Romania joined the Axis powers. On 27 November 1940, 64 former dignitaries or officials were executed by the Iron Guard in the Jilava prison while awaiting trial (see Jilava Massacre). Later that day, historian and former prime minister Nicolae Iorga and economist Virgil Madgearu, a former government minister, were assassinated.

The cohabitation between the Iron Guard and Antonescu was never an easy one. On 20 January 1941, the Iron Guard attempted a coup, combined with a bloody pogrom against the Jews of Bucharest. Within four days, Antonescu had successfully suppressed the coup. The Iron Guard was forced out of the government. Sima and many other legionnaires took refuge in Germany; others were imprisoned. Antonescu abolished the National Legionary State, in its stead declaring Romania a "National and Social State."

== The war on the Eastern Front ==
Romania annexed Transnistria, the area between the Dniester and Southern Bug, in July 1941 (1941 Romanian census).

1941 stamp depicting a Romanian and a German soldier in reference to the two countries' common participation in Operation Barbarossa. The text below reads "the holy war against Bolshevism".

On 22 June 1941, German armies with a massive Romanian support attacked the Soviet Union. German and Romanian units conquered Bessarabia, Odessa, and Sevastopol, then marched eastward across the Russian steppes toward Stalingrad. Romania welcomed the war because it allowed them to retake lands annexed by the Soviet Union a year prior. Hitler rewarded Romania's loyalty by returning Bessarabia and northern Bukovina and by allowing Romania to administer Soviet lands immediately between the Dniester and the Bug, including Odessa and Nikolaev. Romanian jingoes in Odessa even distributed a geography showing that the Dacians had inhabited most of southern Russia. After recovering Bessarabia and Bukovina (Operation München), Romanian units fought side by side with the Germans onward to Odessa, Sevastopol, Stalingrad and the Caucasus. The total number of troops involved on the Eastern Front with the Romanian Third Army and the Romanian Fourth Army was second only to that of Nazi Germany itself. The Romanian Army had a total of 686,258 men under arms in the summer of 1941 and a total of 1,224,691 men in the summer of 1944. The number of Romanian troops sent to fight in the Soviet Union exceeded that of all of Germany's other allies combined. A Country Study by the U.S. Federal Research Division of the Library of Congress attributes this to a "morbid competition with Hungary to curry Hitler's favor... [in hope of]... regaining northern Transylvania."

Bessarabia and Northern Bukovina were now fully re-incorporated into the Romanian state after they had been occupied by the USSR a year earlier. As a substitute for Northern Transylvania, which had been given to Hungary following the Second Vienna Award, Hitler persuaded Antonescu in August 1941 to also take control of the Transnistria territory between the Dniester and the Southern Bug, which would also include Odessa after its eventual fall in October 1941. Although the Romanian administration set up a civil government, the Transnistria Governorate, the Romanian state had not yet formally incorporated Transnistria into its administrative framework by the time it was retaken by Soviet troops in early 1944.

Romanian armies advanced far into the Soviet Union during 1941 and 1942 before being involved in the disaster at the Battle of Stalingrad in the winter of 1942–43. Petre Dumitrescu, one of Romania's most important generals, was commander of the Third Army at Stalingrad. In November 1942, the German Sixth Army was briefly put at Dumitrescu's disposal during a German attempt to relieve the Third Army following the devastating Soviet Operation Uranus.

Prior to the Soviet counteroffensive at Stalingrad, the Antonescu government considered a war with Hungary over Transylvania an inevitability after the expected victory over the Soviet Union. Although it was an ally of Germany, Romania's later turning to the Allied side in August 1944 was rewarded by returning Northern Transylvania, which had been granted to Hungary in 1940 after the Second Vienna Award.

== War comes to Romania ==
=== Air raids ===
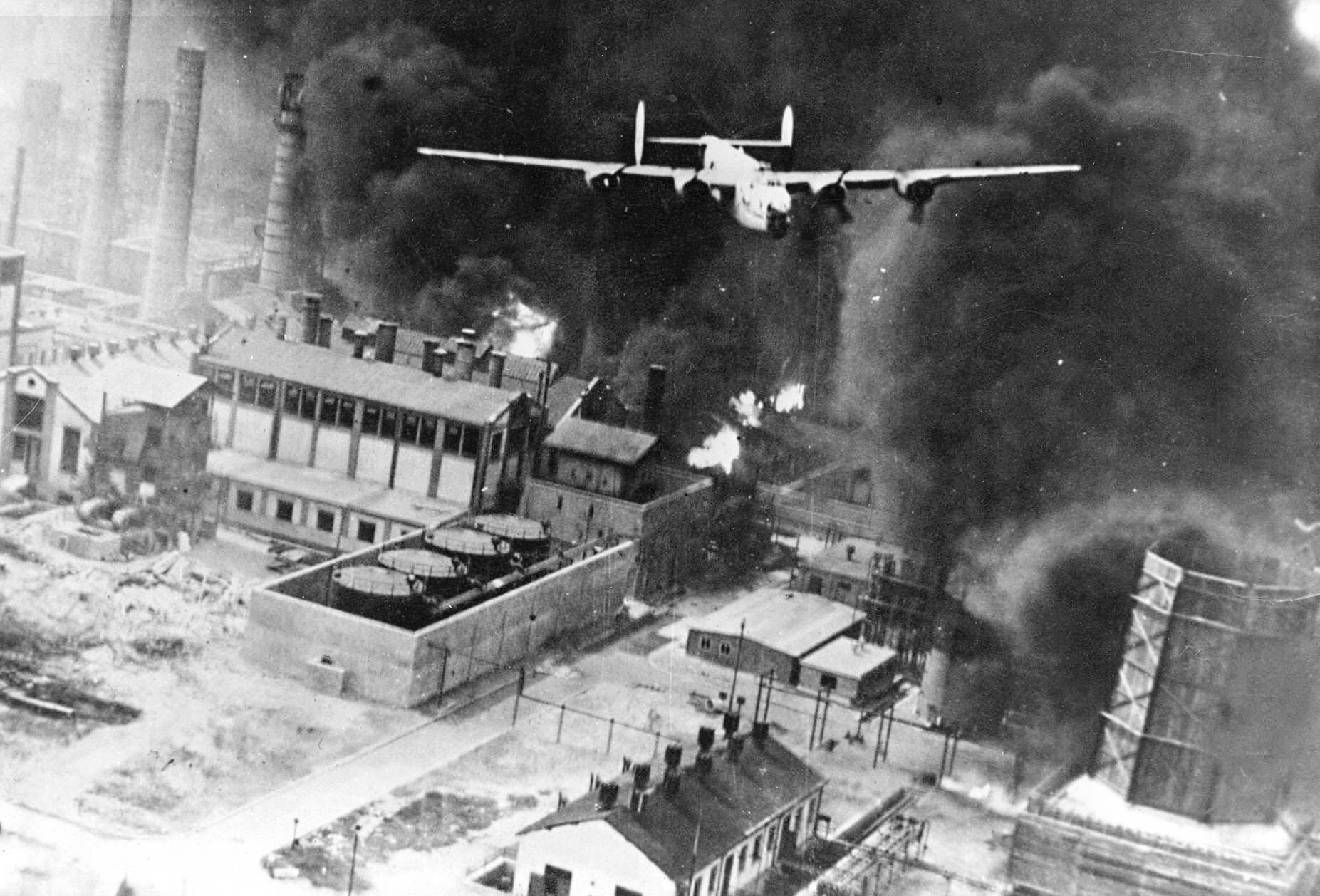
American B-24 Liberator flying over a burning oil refinery at Ploiești, as part of Operation Tidal Wave on 1 August 1943. Due to its role as a major supplier of oil to the Axis, Romania was a prime target of Allied strategic bombing in 1943 and 1944.

Throughout the Antonescu years, Romania supplied Nazi Germany and the Axis armies with oil, grain, and industrial products. Also, numerous train stations in the country, such as Gara de Nord in Bucharest, served as transit points for troops departing for the Eastern Front. Consequently, by 1943 Romania became a target of Allied aerial bombardment. One of the most notable air bombardments was Operation Tidal Wave — the attack on the oil fields of Ploiești on 1 August 1943. Bucharest was subjected to intense Allied bombardment on 4 and 15 April 1944, and the Luftwaffe itself bombed the city on 24 and 25 August after the country switched sides.

=== Ground offensive ===
In February 1943, with the decisive Soviet counteroffensive at Stalingrad, it was growing clear that the tide of the war was turning against the Axis powers.

By 1944, the Romanian economy was in tatters because of the expenses of the war, and destructive Allied air bombing throughout the country, including the capital, Bucharest. In addition, most of the products sent to Germany – such as oil, grain, and equipment – were provided without monetary compensation, as Nazi Germany refused to pay. As a result of these uncompensated exports, inflation in Romania skyrocketed. This caused widespread discontent among the Romanian population, even among those who had once enthusiastically supported the Germans and the war, and an angry relationship between Romania and Germany.

Beginning in December 1943, the Soviet Dnieper–Carpathian Offensive pushed Axis forces all the way back to the Dniester by April 1944. In April–May 1944, the Romanian forces led by General Mihai Racoviță, together with elements of the German Eighth Army were responsible for defending northern Romania and took part in the Battles of Târgu Frumos, which David Glantz considered to be an initial Soviet attempt to invade Romania, supposedly held back by Axis defensive lines in northern Romania.

The Jassy–Kishinev Offensive, launched on 20 August 1944, resulted in a quick and decisive Soviet breakthrough, collapsing the German-Romanian front in the region. Soviet forces captured Târgu Frumos and Iași on 21 August and Chișinău on 24 August 1944. The strategic Focșani Gate was invaded on 27 August 1944 by Soviet forces, which allowed them to spread out onto Bucharest, the Black Sea and the Eastern Carpathians.

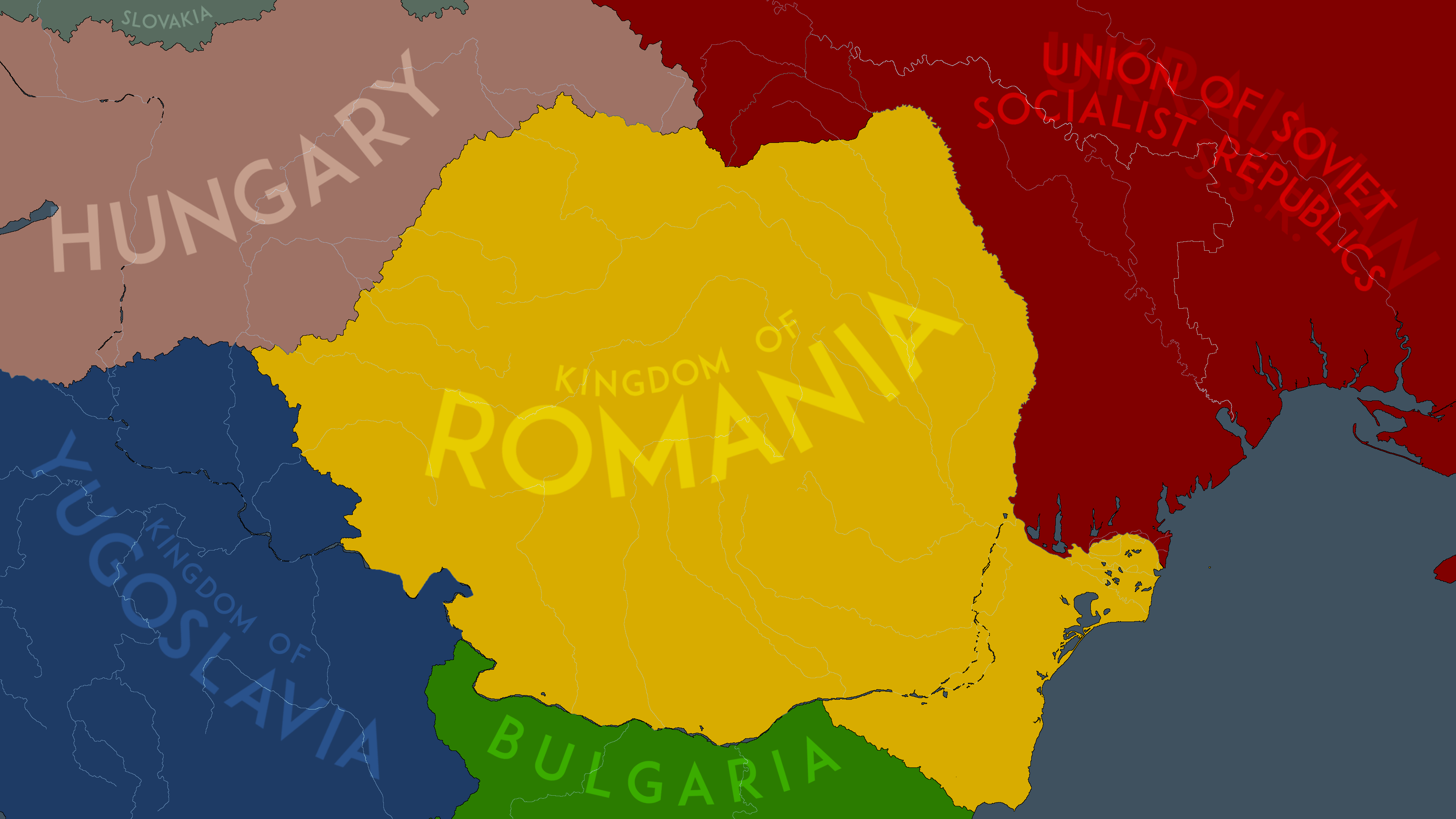
Romania on 3 July 1940, after the Soviet occupation of Bessarabia and Northern Bukovina.

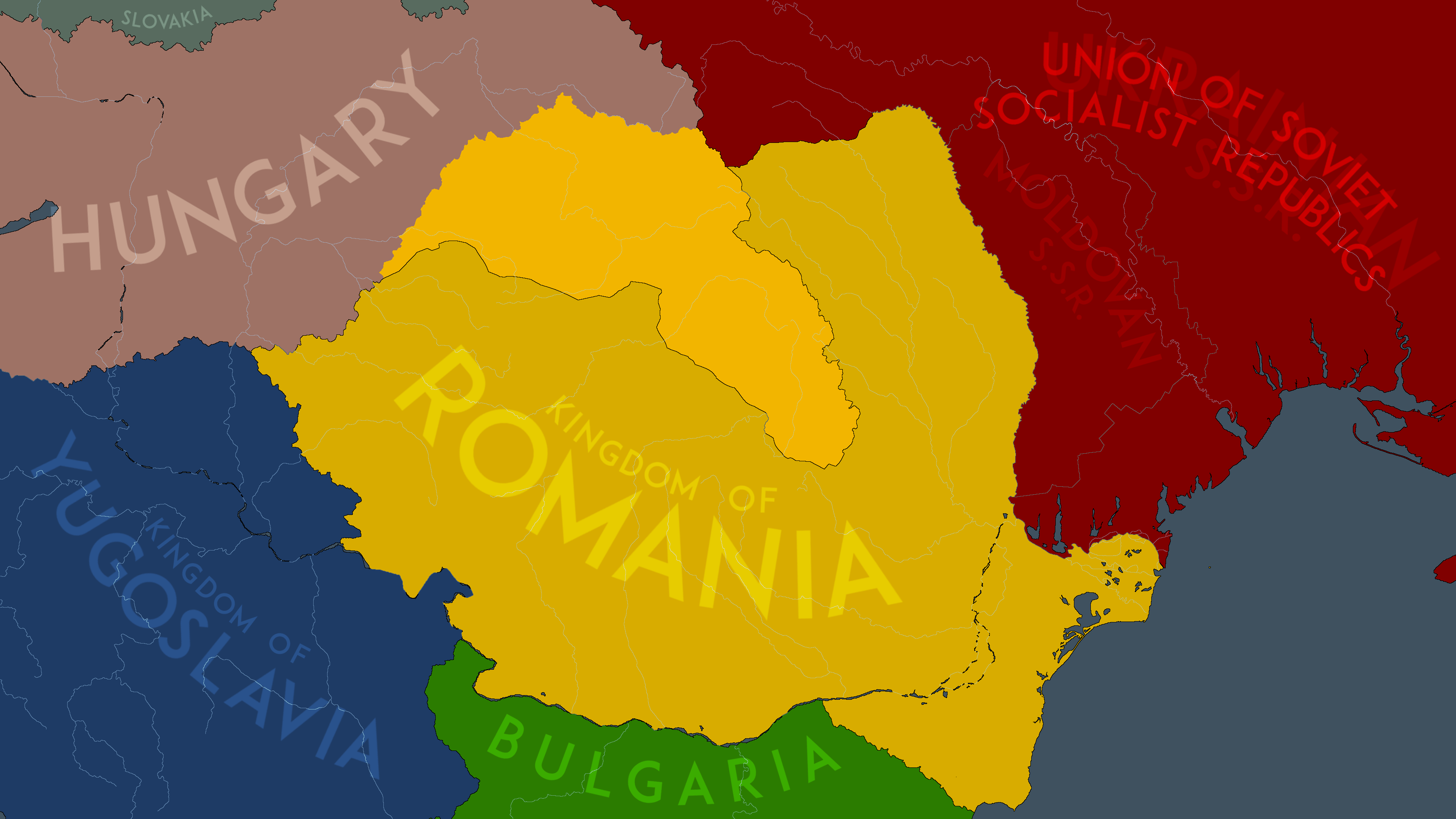
Romania on 30 August 1940, after the Second Vienna Award. The Hungarian advance into Northern Transylvania began on the 5th of September.

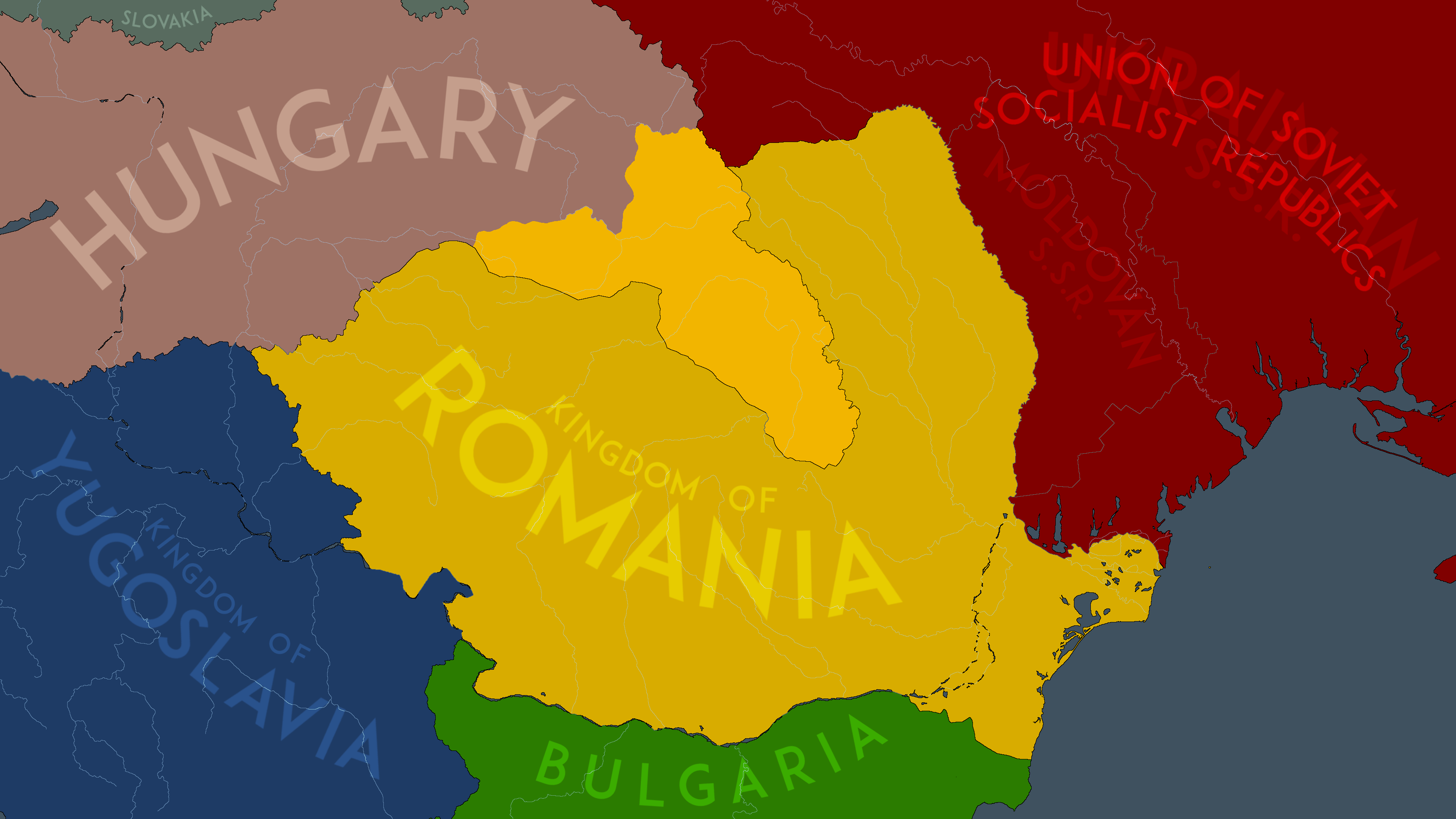
Romania on 7 September 1940, after the Treaty of Craiova.

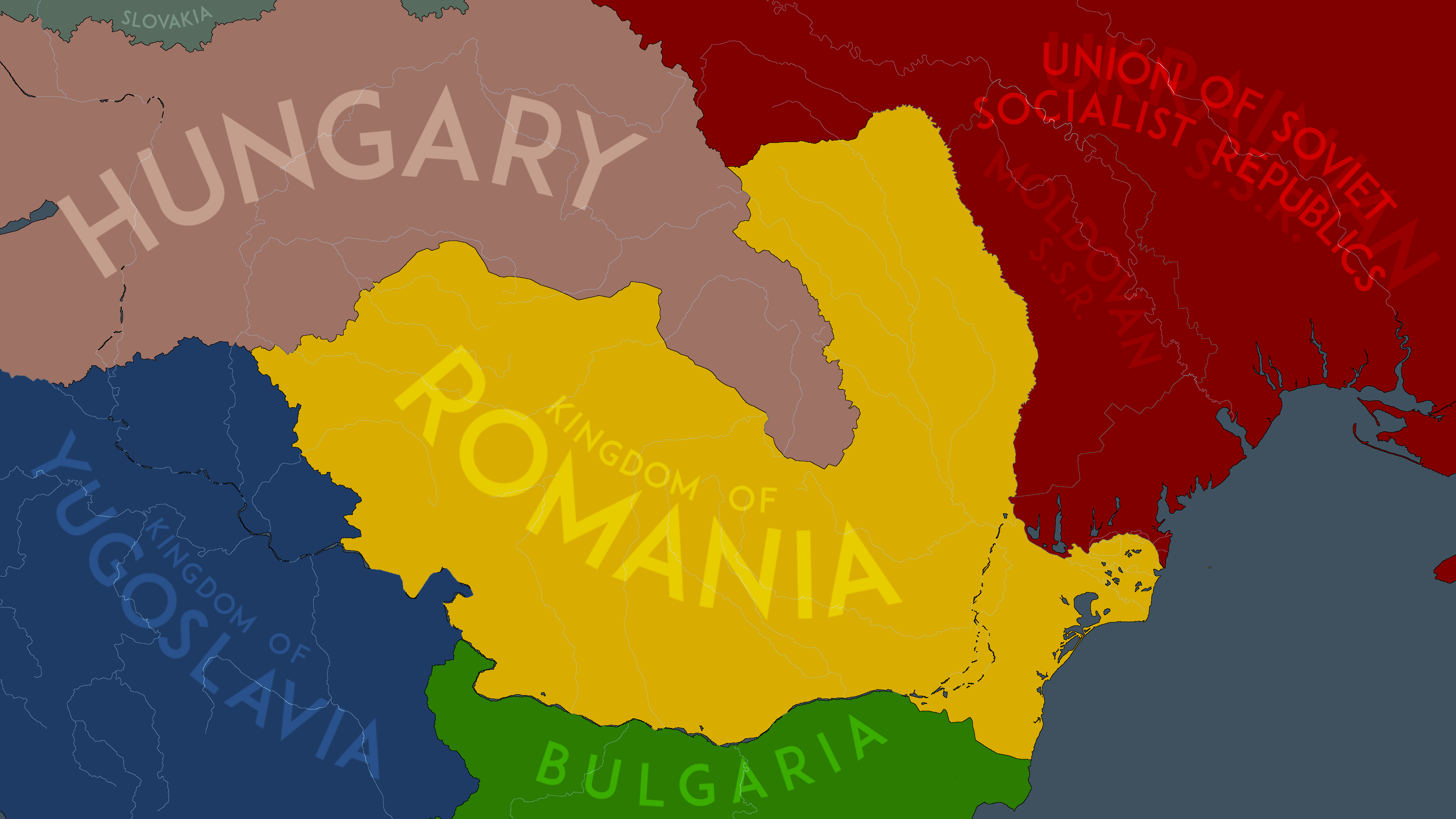
Romania on 13 September 1940, after the Hungarian army reached the Second Vienna Award frontier.

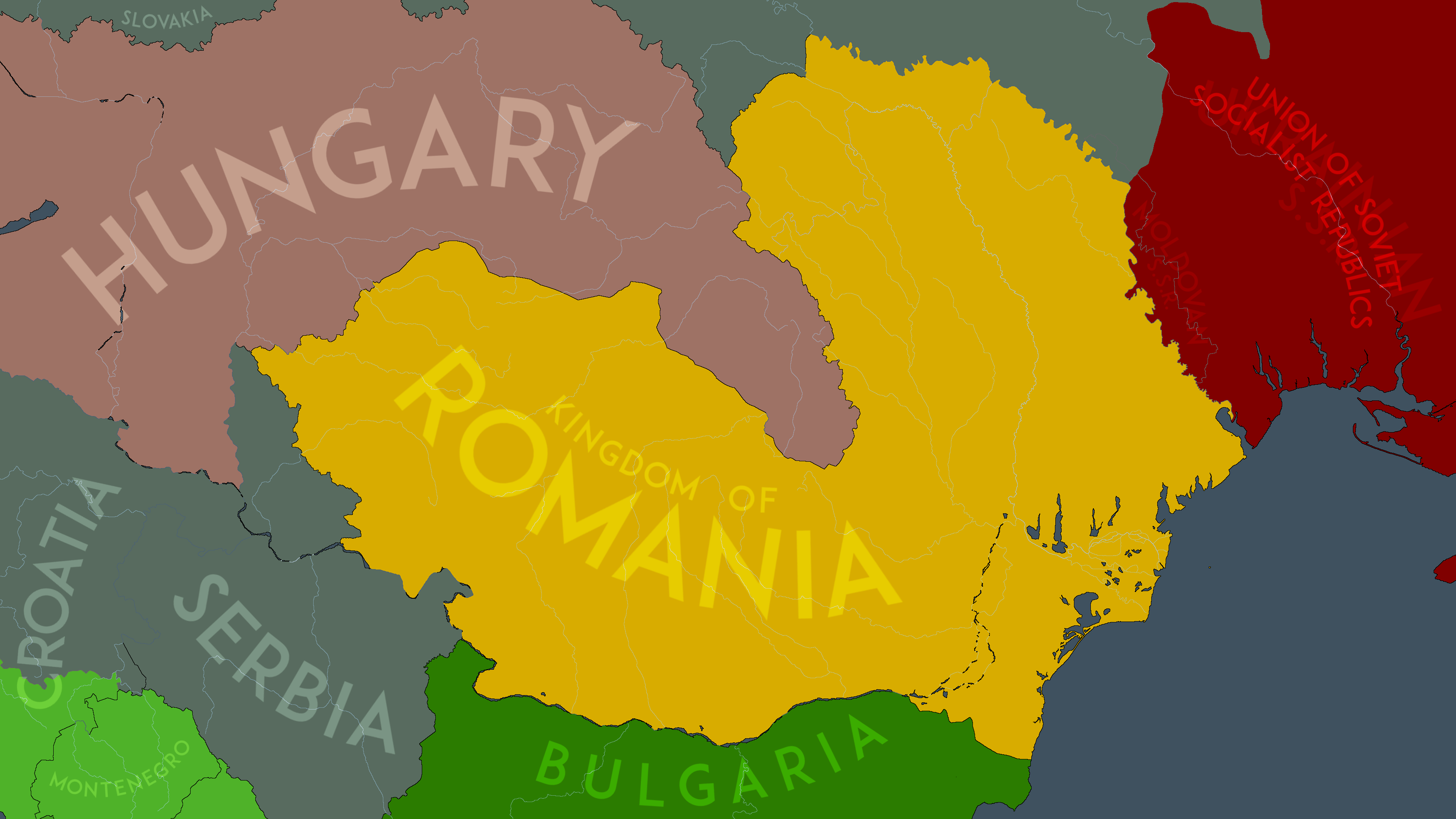
Romania on 25 July 1941, after Operation München.

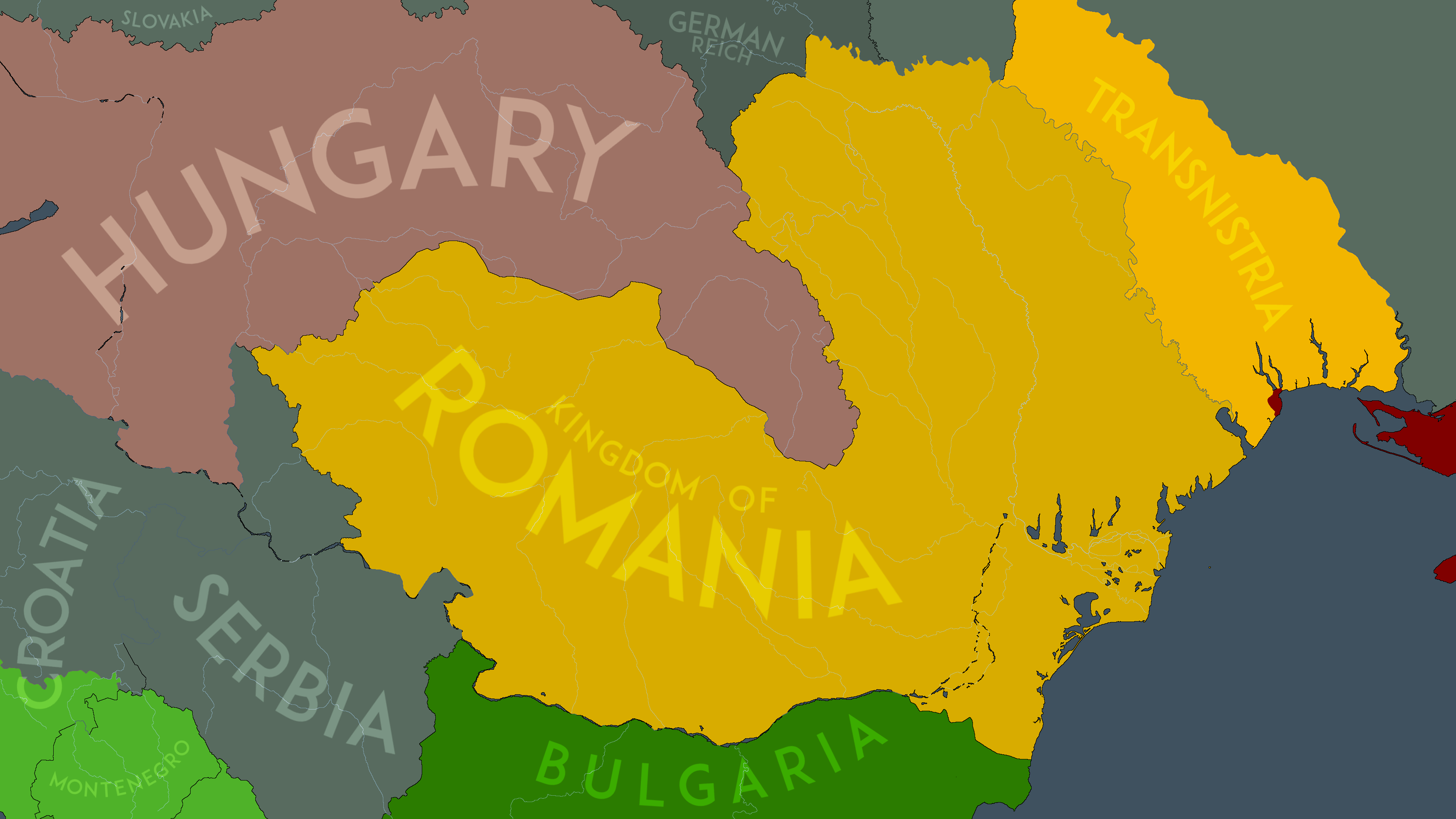
Romania on 19 August 1941, after the establishment of the Transnistria Governorate. Odessa fell to the Axis armies on the 16th of October.

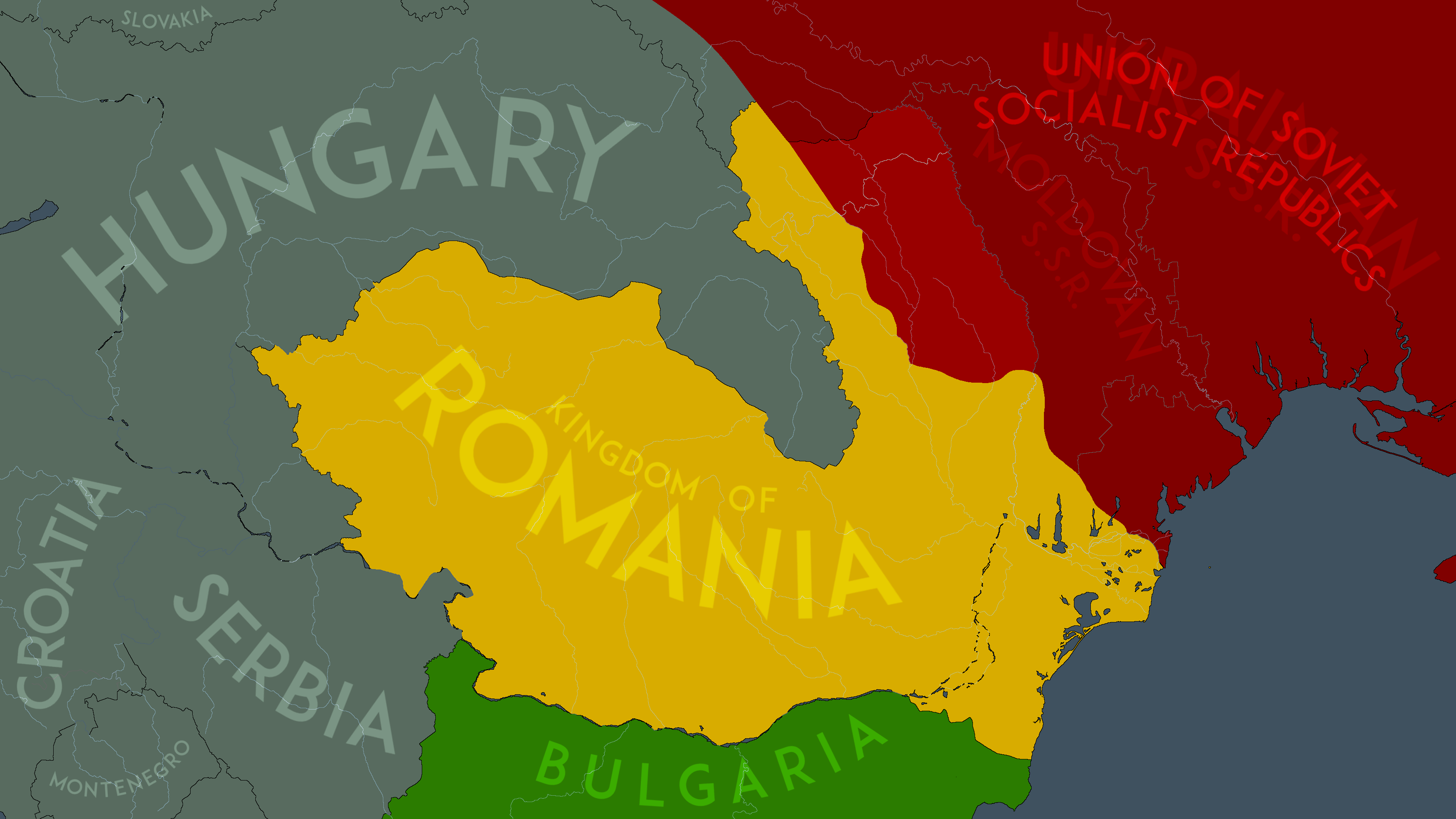
Romania on 23 August 1944, after King Michael's coup and its withdrawal from the Axis. German troops were present on the eastern front at the time.

== The Holocaust ==
See also Responsibility for the Holocaust (Romania), Antonescu and the Holocaust, Porajmos#Persecution in other Axis countries.

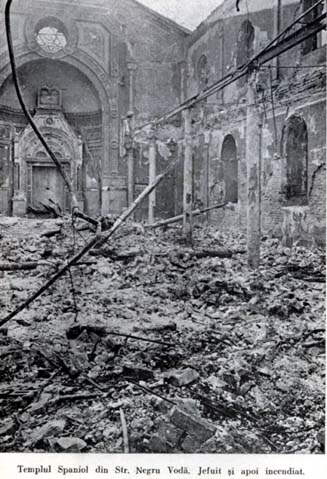
Sephardic Temple in Bucharest after it was plundered and set on fire in 1941

According to an international commission report released by the Romanian government in 2004, between 280,000 and 380,000 Jews were murdered or died in various forms on Romanian soil, in the war zones of Bessarabia, Bukovina, and in the Soviet territories under Romanian occupation (Transnistria Governorate). Of the 25,000 Romani deported, who were deported to concentration camps in Transnistria, 11,000 died.

Though much of the killing was committed in the war zone by Romanian and German troops, there were also substantial persecutions behind the front line. During the Iaşi pogrom of June 1941, over 13,000 Jews were massacred or killed slowly in trains traveling back and forth across the countryside.

Half of the estimated 270,000 to 320,000 Jews living in Bessarabia, Bukovina, and Dorohoi County in Romania were murdered or died between June 1941 and the spring of 1944, of which between 45,000 and 60,000 Jews were killed in Bessarabia and Bukovina by Romanian and German troops, within months from the entry of the country into the war during 1941. Even after the initial killings, Jews in Moldavia, Bukovina and Bessarabia were subject to frequent pogroms, and were concentrated into ghettos from which they were sent to Transnistria, including camps built and run by the Romanian authorities.

Romanian soldiers and gendarmes also worked with the Einsatzkommandos, German killing squads, tasked with massacring Jews and Roma in conquered territories, the local Ukrainian militia, and the SS squads of local Ukrainian Germans (Sonderkommando Russland and Selbstschutz). Romanian troops were in large part responsible for the Odessa massacre, in which from October 18, 1941, until mid-March 1942, Romanian soldiers in Odessa, aided by gendarmes and police, killed up to 25,000 Jews and deported more than 35,000.

The number of deaths in all areas is not certain, but the lowest respectable estimates run to about 250,000 Jews and 11,000 Roma in these eastern regions.

Nonetheless, half of the Jews living within the pre-Barbarossa borders survived the war, although they were subject to a wide range of harsh conditions, including forced labor, financial penalties, and discriminatory laws. All Jewish property was nationalized.

The report commissioned and accepted by the Romanian government in 2004 on the Holocaust concluded:

Of all the allies of Nazi Germany, Romania bears responsibility for the deaths of more Jews than any country other than Germany itself. The murders committed in Iasi, Odessa, Bogdanovka, Domanovka, and Peciora, for example, were among the most hideous murders committed against Jews anywhere during the Holocaust. Romania committed genocide against the Jews. The survival of Jews in some parts of the country does not alter this reality.

== The royal coup ==
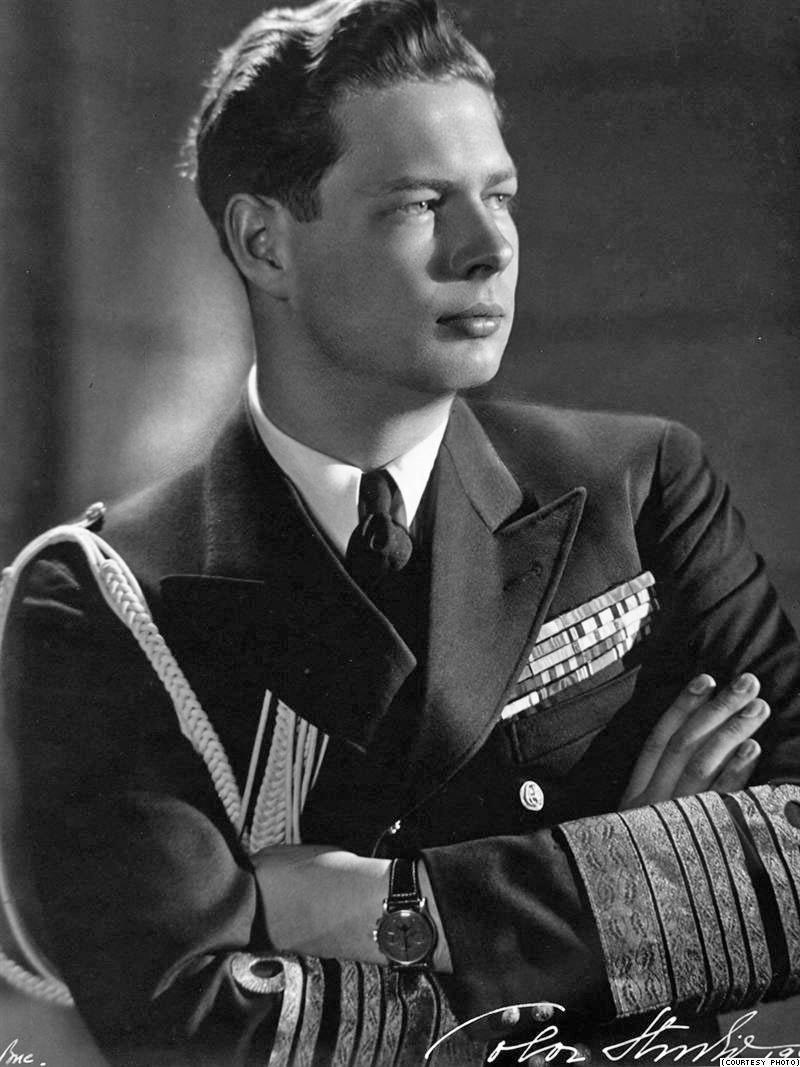
King Michael I of Romania led the coup that put Romania on the Allied side.

On 23 August 1944, with the Red Army penetrating German defenses during the Jassy–Kishinev Offensive, King Michael I of Romania led a successful coup against the Axis with support from opposition politicians, most of the army and Communist-led civilians. Michael I, who was initially considered to be not much more than a figurehead, was able to successfully depose the Antonescu dictatorship. The King then offered a non-confrontational retreat to German ambassador Manfred von Killinger. But the Germans considered the coup "reversible" and attempted to turn the situation around by military force. The Romanian First, Second (forming), and what little was left of the Third and the Fourth Armies (one corps) were under orders from the King to defend Romania against any German attacks. King Michael offered to put the Romanian Army, which at that point had a strength of nearly 1,000,000 men, on the side of the Allies. Stalin immediately recognized the king and the restoration of the conservative Romanian monarchy.

In a radio broadcast to the Romanian nation and army on the night of 23 August King Michael issued a cease-fire, proclaimed Romania's loyalty to the Allies, announced the acceptance of an armistice (to be signed on September 12) offered by Great Britain, the United States, and the USSR, and declared war on Germany. The coup accelerated the Red Army's advance into Romania, but did not avert a rapid Soviet occupation and capture of about 130,000 Romanian soldiers, who were transported to the Soviet Union, where many perished in prison camps. The armistice was signed three weeks later on September 12, 1944, on terms dictated by the Soviet Union. Under the terms of the armistice, Romania announced its unconditional surrender to the USSR and was placed under occupation of the Allied forces with the Soviet Union as their representative, in control of media, communication, post, and civil administration behind the front. Some attribute the postponement of a formal Allied recognition of the de facto change of orientation until 12 September (the date the armistice was signed in Moscow) to the complexities of the negotiations between the USSR and UK.

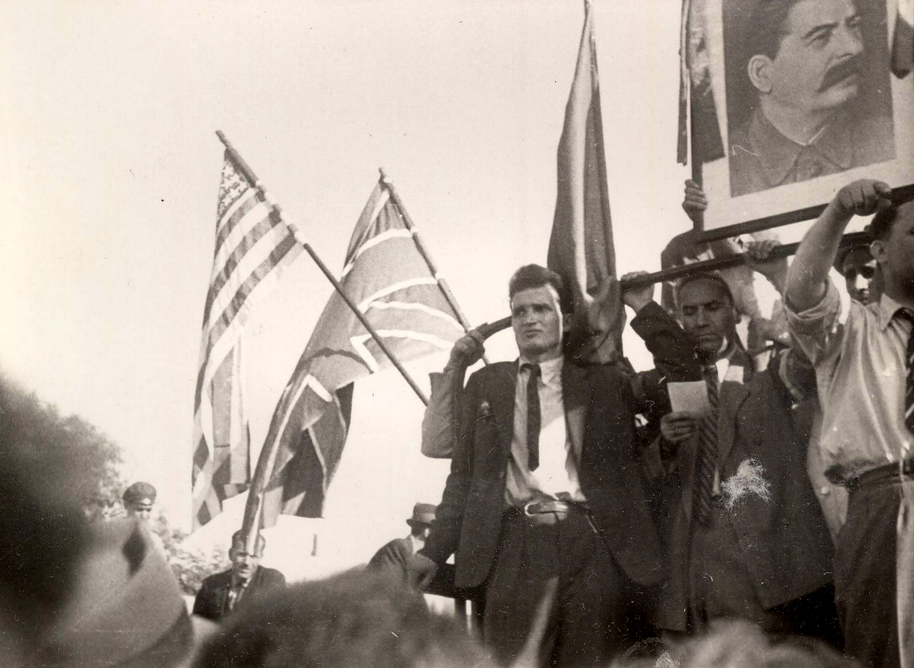
Nicolae Ceaușescu and others welcome the Red Army as it enters Bucharest on 30 August 1944

During the Moscow Conference in October 1944 Winston Churchill, Prime Minister of the United Kingdom, proposed an agreement to Soviet leader Joseph Stalin on how to split up Eastern Europe into spheres of influence after the war. The Soviet Union was offered a 90% share of influence in Romania.

The Armistice Agreement of 12 September stipulated in Article 18 that "An Allied Control Commission will be established which will undertake until the conclusion of peace the regulation of and control over the execution of the present terms under the general direction and orders of the Allied (Soviet) High Command, acting on behalf of the Allied Powers". The Annex to Article 18 made clear that "The Romanian Government and their organs shall fulfil all instructions of the Allied Control Commission arising out of the Armistice Agreement." The Agreement also stipulated that the Allied Control Commission would have its seat in Bucharest. In line with Article 14 of the Armistice Agreement, two Romanian People's Tribunals were set up to try suspected war criminals.

== Campaign against the Axis ==
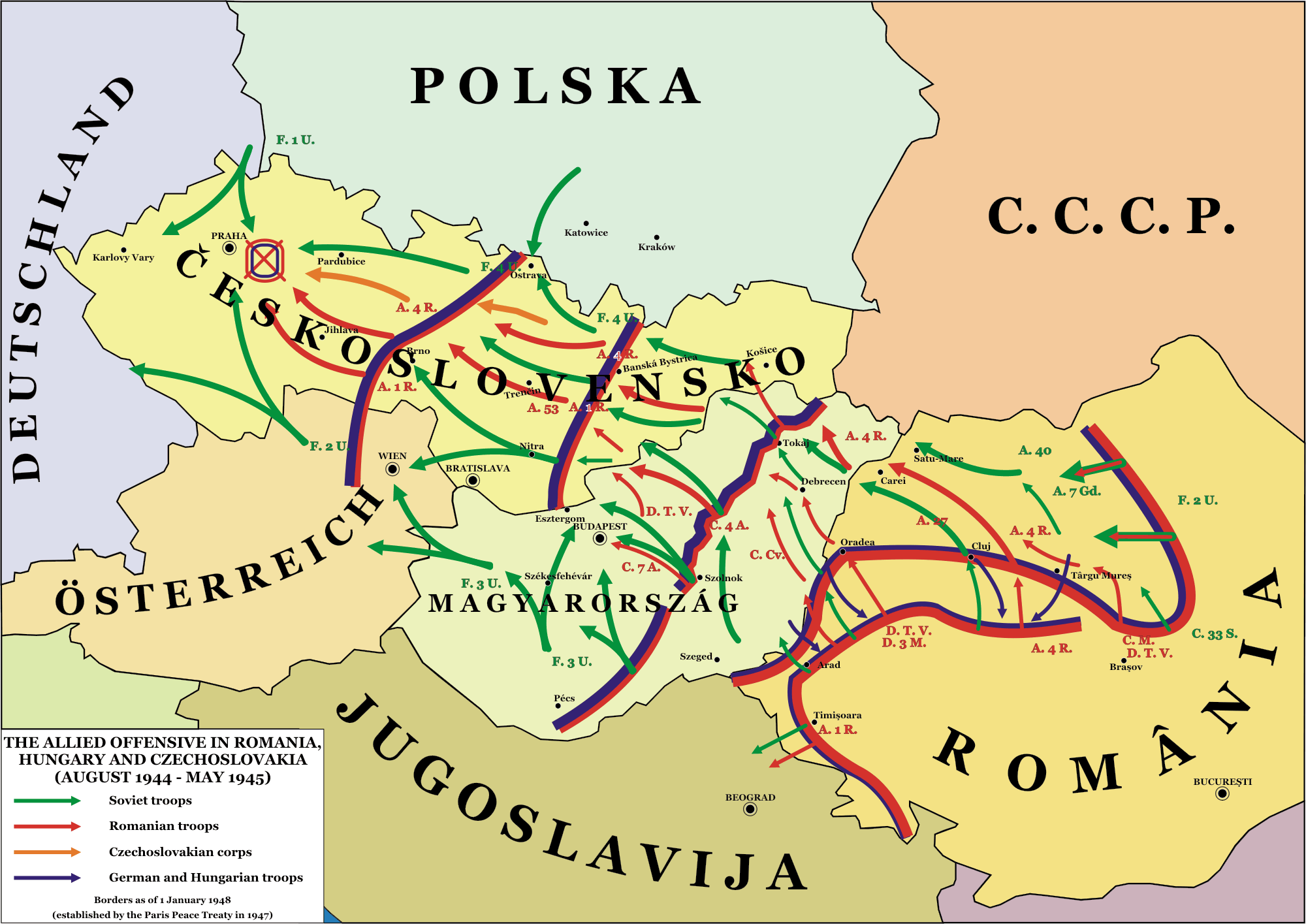
Romanian operations against the Axis

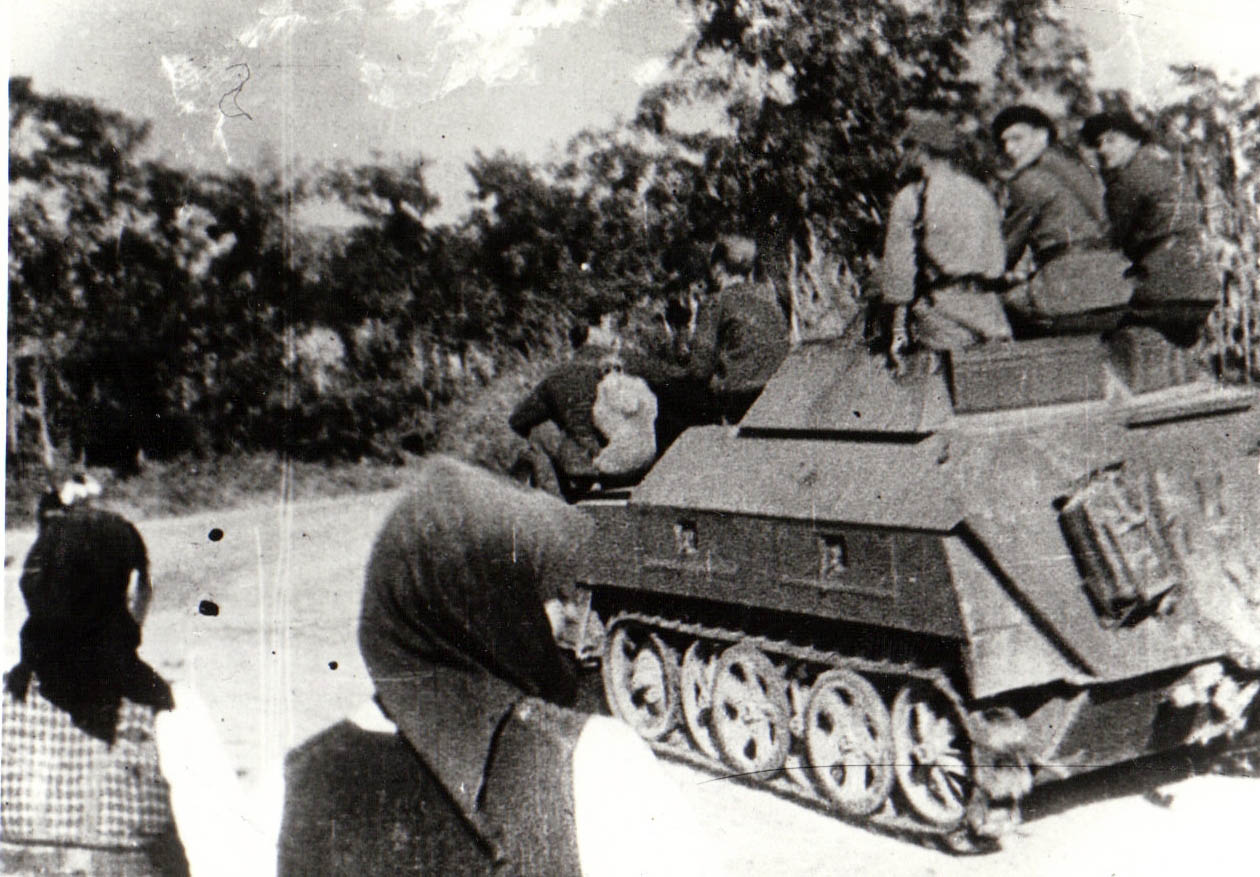
Romanian soldiers in Transylvania, September–October 1944

As the country declared war on Germany on the night of 23 August 1944, border clashes between Hungarian and Romanian troops erupted almost immediately. On 24 August, German troops attempted to seize Bucharest and suppress Michael's coup, but were repelled by the city's defenses. Other Wehrmacht units in the country suffered severe losses: remnants of the Sixth Army retreating west of the Prut River were cut off and destroyed by the Red Army, which was now advancing at an even greater speed, while Romanian units attacked German garrisons at the Ploiești oilfields, forcing them to retreat to Hungary. The Romanian Army captured over 50,000 German prisoners around this time, who were later surrendered to the Soviets.

In early September 1944, Soviet and Romanian forces entered Transylvania and captured the towns of Brașov and Sibiu while advancing toward the Mureș River. Their main objective was Cluj, a city regarded as the historical capital of Transylvania. However, the Second Hungarian Army was present in the region, and together with the Eighth German Army engaged the Allied forces on 5 September 1944 in what was to become the Battle of Turda, which lasted until 8 October and resulted in heavy casualties for both sides. Also around this time, the Hungarian Army carried out its last independent offensive action of the war, penetrating Arad County in western Romania. Despite initial success, a number of ad-hoc Romanian cadet battalions managed to stop the Hungarian advance at the Battle of Păuliș, and soon a combined Romanian-Soviet counterattack overwhelmed the Hungarians, who gave ground and evacuated Arad itself on 21 September.

The Battle of Carei marked the last stage of recovering Romania's former territory of Northern Transylvania, ceded in 1940 to Hungary as a result of the Second Vienna Award. On the evening of October 24, 1944, the Romanian 6th Army Corps attacked in the direction of Carei with a force comprising 4 divisions; at the same time, the 2nd Infantry Division of 2nd Army Corps attacked in the direction of Satu Mare, in a pincer movement. On October 25, both cities were freed from Hungarian and German control; by a decree from 1959, this day was established as the Romanian Armed Forces Day.

The Romanian Army ended the war fighting against the Wehrmacht alongside the Red Army in Transylvania, Hungary, Yugoslavia, Austria and the Protectorate of Bohemia and Moravia, from August 1944 until the end of the war in Europe. In May 1945, the First and Fourth armies took part in the Prague Offensive. The Romanian Army incurred heavy casualties fighting Nazi Germany. Of some 538,000 Romanian soldiers who fought against the Axis in 1944–45, some 167,000 were killed, wounded or went missing.

Location	Beginning	End	Personnel	Casualties (KIA, WIA, MIA)	Mountains crossed	Rivers crossed	Liberated villages	From which towns	Losses of the enemy
Romania	1944-08-23	1945-05-12	>275,000 (538,000)	58,330			3,831	31	167,000 KIA, WIA; Materiel
Hungary	1944-10-08	1945-01-15	210,000	42,700	3	4	1,237	14	21,045 POW; 9,700 KIA ? WIA; Materiel
Protectorate of Bohemia and Moravia	1944-12-18	1945-05-12	248,430	66,495	10	4	1,722	31	22,803 KIA, WIA, POW
Alpine and Danube Reichsgaue	1945–04-10	1945-05-12	2,000	100			7	1	4,000 KIA, WIA, POW; Materiel
TOTAL	1944-08-23	1945-05-12	538,536	169,822	20	12	3,821	53	117,798 POW; 18,731 KIA
LEGEND: KIA = Killed in Action; MIA = Missing in Action; WIA = Wounded in Action; POW = Prisoners of war.

== Aftermath ==
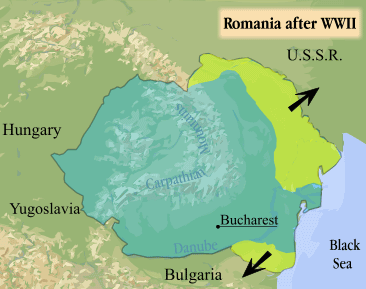
Map of Romania after World War II indicating lost territories.

Under the 1947 Treaty of Paris, the Allies did not acknowledge Romania as a co-belligerent nation but instead applied the term "ally of Hitlerite Germany" to all recipients of the treaty's stipulations. Like Finland, Romania had to pay $300 million to the Soviet Union as war reparations. However, the treaty specifically recognized that Romania switched sides on 24 August 1944, and therefore "acted in the interests of all the United Nations". As a reward, Northern Transylvania was, once again, recognized as an integral part of Romania, but the border with the USSR and Bulgaria was fixed at its state in January 1941, restoring the pre-Barbarossa status quo (with one exception). Following the dissolution of the Soviet Union in 1991, the Eastern territories became part of Ukraine and the Republic of Moldova.

In Romania proper, Soviet occupation following World War II facilitated the rise of the Communist Party as the main political force, leading ultimately to the abdication of the King and the establishment of a single-party people's republic in 1947.

== Major battles and campaigns ==
This is a list of battles and other combat operations in World War II in which Romanian forces took part.

Battle	Date	Location	Romania and its allies	Enemies	Issue
Soviet occupation of Bessarabia and Northern Bukovina	28 June – 3 July 1940	Romania	Romania	Soviet Union	Defeat
Legionnaires' rebellion and Bucharest pogrom	21–23 January 1941	Romania	Romanian government	Iron Guard	Victory
As part of the Axis (1941–1944)
Operation Barbarossa	22 June – 5 December 1941	Soviet Union	Germany Romania Finland Italy Hungary Slovakia Croatia	Soviet Union	Defeat
Raid on Constanța	26 June 1941	Romania	Romania Germany	Soviet Union	Victory
Operation München	2–26 July 1941	Romania	Romania Germany	Soviet Union	Victory
Battle of Uman	15 July – 8 August 1941	Soviet Union	Germany Romania Hungary Slovakia Croatia	Soviet Union	Victory
Siege of Odessa	8 August – 16 October 1941	Soviet Union	Romania Germany	Soviet Union	Victory
Battle of the Sea of Azov	September 1941 – August 1942	Soviet Union	Romania Germany	Soviet Union	Victory
Siege of Sevastopol	30 October 1941 – 4 July 1942	Soviet Union	Germany Romania Italy	Soviet Union	Victory
Battle of Rostov	21 – 27 November 1941	Soviet Union	Germany Romania Slovakia	Soviet Union	Defeat
Second Battle of Kharkov	12 – 28 May 1942	Soviet Union	Germany Romania Italy	Soviet Union	Victory
Case Blue	28 June – 24 November 1942	Soviet Union	Germany Italy Romania Hungary Slovakia Croatia	Soviet Union	Defeat
Battle of the Caucasus	25 July 1942 – 12 May 1944	Soviet Union	Germany Italy Romania	Soviet Union	Defeat
Battle of Stalingrad	23 August 1942 – 2 February 1943	Soviet Union	Germany Italy Romania Hungary Croatia	Soviet Union	Defeat
Operation Uranus	19 – 23 November 1942	Soviet Union	Germany Italy Romania Hungary	Soviet Union	Defeat
Operation Winter Storm	12 – 23 December 1942	Soviet Union	Germany Romania	Soviet Union	Defeat
Operation Little Saturn	12 December 1942 – 18 February 1943	Soviet Union	Germany Italy Romania Hungary	Soviet Union	Defeat
Operation Tidal Wave	1 August 1943	Romania	Germany Romania Bulgaria	United States	Victory
Donbass Strategic Offensive	13 August – 22 September 1943	Soviet Union	Germany Italy Romania Hungary	Soviet Union	Defeat
Battle of the Dnieper	24 August – 23 December 1943	Soviet Union	Germany Romania	Soviet Union (Czechoslovakia) Czechoslovak Army Corps	Defeat
Kerch-Eltigen Operation	November 1943	Soviet Union	Germany Romania	Soviet Union	Defeat
Dnieper-Carpathian Offensive	24 December 1943 – 14 April 1944	Soviet Union	Germany Romania	Soviet Union	Defeat
Uman–Botoșani Offensive	5 March – 17 April 1944	Soviet Union	Germany Romania	Soviet Union	Defeat
First Jassy–Kishinev Offensive	8 April – 6 June 1944	Soviet Union	Germany Romania	Soviet Union	Victory
Crimean Offensive	8 April – 12 May 1944	Soviet Union	Germany Romania Bulgaria	Soviet Union	Defeat
Lublin-Brest Offensive	18 July – 2 August 1944	Belarus/Poland	Germany Romania	Soviet Union Poland	Defeat
Jassy–Kishinev Offensive (First phase)	20–23 August 1944	Romania	Germany Romania	Soviet Union	Switched sides
As part of the Allies (1944–1945)
Jassy–Kishinev Offensive (Second phase)	23–29 August 1944	Romania	Soviet Union Romania aerial support: United States	Germany	Victory
Battle of Turda	5 September – 8 October 1944	Romania	Soviet Union Romania	Germany Hungary	Victory
Battle of Păuliș	14–19 September 1944	Romania	Romania	Hungary	Victory
Battle of Debrecen	6–29 October 1944	Hungary	Soviet Union Romania	Germany (Kingdom of Hungary (1920–1946)) Hungary	Victory
Battle of Carei	21–25 October 1944	Hungary	Romania	Hungary	Victory
Budapest Offensive	29 October 1944 – 13 February 1945	Hungary	Soviet Union Romania	Germany (Kingdom of Hungary (1920–1946)) Hungary	Victory
Siege of Budapest	29 December 1944 – 13 February 1945	Hungary	Soviet Union Romania	Germany (Kingdom of Hungary (1920–1946)) Hungary	Victory
Bratislava–Brno Offensive	25 March – 5 May 1945	Protectorate of Bohemia and Moravia, Slovakia	Soviet Union Romania Czechoslovakia Army Corps	Germany (Kingdom of Hungary (1920–1946)) Hungary	Victory
Prague Offensive	6–11 May 1945	Protectorate of Bohemia and Moravia	Soviet Union Poland Romania (Russia) Russian Liberation Army	Germany (Kingdom of Hungary (1920–1946)) Hungary Slovakia	Victory

== Romanian armament during World War II ==
=== Modern non-self-propelled weapons ===
The list below displays the modern (designed and built after the end of World War I) infantry weapons and artillery pieces used by the Romanian Army during World War II.

Type	Origin	Number	Notes
Rifles
vz. 24	Czechoslovakia	445,640+	700,000 ordered, 445,640 received by the Romanian Army by mid-1943
Submachine guns
Beretta Model 38	Italy	5,000	5,000 ordered in 1941 and delivered during 1942
Orița M1941	Romania	Unknown (10,000+)	Local design, entered operational service with the Romanian Army in 1943 with a production rate of 666 pieces per month as of October 1942
MP 40	Germany	Unknown	Supplied by Germany
Machine guns
ZB vz. 30	Czechoslovakia; Romania	28,000	18,000 imported from Czechoslovakia and 10,000 licence-built locally at Cugir with a production rate of 250 pieces per month as of October 1942
ZB-53	Czechoslovakia	5,500	5,500 purchased, 3,500 in 1941 followed by 2,000 in 1943
Hotchkiss M1929	France	200	200 ordered and all delivered before the fall of France
Mortars
Brandt Mle 1935	Romania; France	300+	125 imported from France and well over 175 built locally under licence at the Voina Works in Brașov, with a production rate of 26 pieces per month as of October 1942
Brandt Mle 27/31	Romania; France	1,188+	188 imported from France and well over 410 built locally under licence at the Voina Works in Brașov, with a production rate of 30 pieces per month as of October 1942 (over 1,000 such mortars were built in Romania by mid-1943)
M1938	Romania; Soviet Union	Unknown (hundreds)	Captured and reverse-engineered Soviet model, produced at the Reșița Works with a production rate of 80 pieces per month as of October 1942
Anti-aircraft guns
2 cm flak	Germany	300	300 ordered in September 1940, the delivery beginning in May 1941, known as Gustloff guns (after one of their manufacturers)
20 mm Oerlikon	Switzerland	45	45 pieces purchased from Germany
25 mm Hotchkiss	France	72	300 ordered but only 72 delivered until the fall of France
3.7 cm flak	Romania; Germany	360	360 produced under licence at the Astra Works beginning with 1938, with 102 delivered by May 1941 and a production rate of 6 pieces per month as of October 1942
40 mm Bofors	Sweden	54	54 purchased from Germany
75 mm Vickers	Romania; United Kingdom	200	200 built under licence by the Reșița Works, with 100 delivered by mid-1941 and the second batch of 100 started in July 1941, the production rate being of 5 pieces per month as of October 1942
Anti-tank guns
25 mm Hotchkiss	France	Unknown	Unknown quantity delivered
37 mm Bofors	Sweden; Poland	669	669 pieces (former Polish ones) purchased from Germany (most common Romanian anti-tank gun in 1941)
45 mm M1942	Soviet Union	Unknown	Captured Soviet model, some Romanian anti-tank platoons had four pieces during the second half of World War II
47 mm Böhler	Austria; Italy	820	545 made in Austria and 275 made in Italy, all purchased from Germany
47 mm Schneider	Romania; France	300+	160 purchased from France and well over 140 licence-produced at the Concordia Works in Ploiești, with a production rate of 14 pieces per month as of October 1942
50 mm Pak 38	Germany	110	Towed by captured and overhauled Komsomolets armored tractors
75 mm Pak 40	Germany	Unknown	During the second half of World War II, some Romanian anti-tank platoons each had three Pak 40 guns, used interchangeably with Romania's own 75 mm Reșița Model 1943 anti-tank gun
75 mm Reșița	Romania	375+	Native design combining features from several foreign models, a total of 210 pieces were produced at the Reșița Works, 120 at the Astra Works in Brașov and 42 at the Concordia Works in Ploiești in addition to three prototypes
Field artillery
100 mm Skoda	Czechoslovakia; Romania	500	248 purchased from Czechoslovakia in the mid-1930s and 252 from Germany in 1940–1941 (the Astra Works in Romania manufactured barrels)
105 mm Schneider	France	144	180 ordered but only 144 delivered until the fall of France
150 mm Skoda	Czechoslovakia; Romania	180	180 purchased from Czechoslovakia between 1936 and 1939 (the Astra Works in Romania manufactured barrels)

=== Tanks ===
The list below comprises the models and numbers of Romanian Army tanks of all types in service as of 19 July 1944:

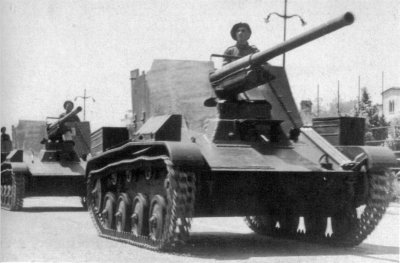
A Romanian TACAM T-60 during the National Day parade, 10 May 1943.

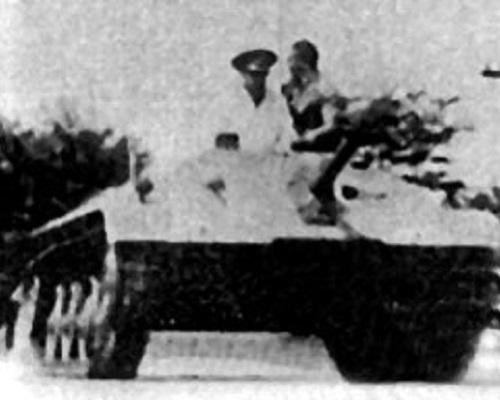
The Mareșal tank destroyer (prototype M-05), the best-known Romanian-built armored vehicle of the war, was in service with the M Battalion of the 2nd Armored Regiment from May to October 1944

Name	Type	Country of Origin	Quantity
FT-17	Light tank	France	62
R-1	Tankette	Czechoslovakia	14
R-35	Light tank	France	30
R-35/45	Tank destroyer	Romania	30
R-2	Light tank	Czechoslovakia	44
T-38	Light tank	Nazi Germany	19
T-3	Medium tank	Nazi Germany	2
T-4	Medium tank	Nazi Germany	81
TACAM T-60	Tank destroyer	Romania	34
TACAM R-2	Tank destroyer	Romania	20
TAs	Assault gun	Nazi Germany	60
Mareșal	Tank destroyer	Romania	7
STZ	Tankette	Romania	34

== See also ==
- German Military Mission in Romania
- Military history of Romania
- List of battles of the Romanian Navy
- List of battles with most Romanian military fatalities
- Latin Axis (World War II)
- Croatian–Romanian–Slovak friendship proclamation

Preceded by Greater Romania	History of Romania	Succeeded by Communist Romania
