= 7.5 cm Pak 50 =

7.5 cm Panzerabwehrkanone 50
- Type: Anti-tank gun
- Place of origin: Nazi Germany

Service history
- Used by: Nazi Germany

Production history
- Designed: 1944
- Produced: 1944
- No. built: ?

Specifications
- Mass: 1,100 kg (2,400 lb)
- Length: 2.24 m (7 ft 4 in) L/30
- Barrel length: 1.43 m (4 ft 8 in) rifled
- Shell: ?
- Shell weight: ?
- Caliber: 75 mm (2.95 in)
- Breech: semi-automatic horizontal sliding wedge
- Carriage: Split trail
- Elevation: −8° to +27°
- Traverse: 65°

The 7.5 cm Panzerabwehrkanone 50 or 7.5 cm Pak 50 was an anti-tank gun, produced in limited numbers by Germany, towards the end of World War II.

== History ==
The 7.5 cm Pak 50 was developed during 1944 and details are scarce. The rationale for the guns might have been to produce a lighter, more portable and easily concealable version of the Pak 40. Despite its Panzerabwehrkanone designation, it may have been a dual-purpose gun with both anti-tank and Infanteriegeschütz or Infantry support gun roles.

== Design ==
The Pak 50 consisted of a shortened 7.5 cm Pak 40 barrel and recoil mechanism mounted on the carriage of the earlier 5 cm Pak 38. The carriage was a split-trail design with spoked metal wheels and solid rubber tires. There was also a curved two-layer gun shield and the breech was a semi-automatic horizontal sliding wedge. Once fired the breech would open and eject the spent casing and it remained open until the next round was loaded and the breech was closed and the gun was again ready to fire.

Compared to the Pak 40 which had a 3.45 m (11 ft 4 in) L/46 caliber barrel, the Pak 50 had a shorter 2.24 m (7 ft 4 in) L/30 barrel. Available photographs of the Pak 50 show two different types of muzzle brake were used. One was a square three baffle design, while the other was a five baffle design. The Pak 40 weighed 1,425 kg (3,142 lb), while the Pak 50 weighed 1,100 kg (2,400 lb). Compared to the IG 37 and IG 42 which weighed 510–590 kg (1,120–1,300 lb) the Pak 50 was much heavier and its maximum elevation of +27° was less than either of the infantry support guns.

Its lack of elevation would suggest it was a direct-fire instead of an indirect-fire weapon and its weight would indicate it fired a larger projectile than the infantry support guns. It's possible it used a shell smaller than the fixed 75×714mm R shell from the Pak 40 and rather than firing a conventional armor-piercing round it could have fired a HEAT round. The advantage is if it fired a HEAT round the size of the propellant charge, its muzzle velocity and amount of recoil could all be lessened since HEAT rounds rely on chemical energy to penetrate armor and not velocity. However, the ammunition used and the gun's performance are unknown.

== KwK 67 and KwK 68 variants ==
The 7.5 cm KwK 67 and 7.5 cm KwK 68 were German anti-tank guns developed during World War II as variants of the Pak 50 anti-tank gun. These weapons were created as part of Germany's effort to strengthen defensive fortifications during the later stages of the war.

=== Development ===
The KwK 67 was created by mounting a Pak 50 barrel on the carriage of a 5 cm KwK 39/1 tank gun, while the KwK 68 utilized the mounting from the 5 cm KwK 38, similarly fitted with the Pak 50 barrel. Both variants were specifically designed for installation in field fortifications rather than mobile operations.

The development program emerged from the need to upgrade existing defensive positions as the 5 cm guns became increasingly ineffective against improved Allied armor. Evidence suggests an earlier project may have begun in 1943 for coastal defense applications, but serious development did not commence until the second half of 1944 when demand for defensive artillery increased significantly.

=== Sockellafetten mounting systems ===
In addition to these repurposed tank guns used in fixed fortifications, the German military employed surplus tank cannons on specialized pivot mounts called Sockellafetten (pedestal mounts). These mounting systems were extensively used in the Atlantic Wall and other defensive installations.

The Sockellafetten program produced mountings for various calibers:

Mounting designation	Compatible weapons
Sockellafetten Ia	5 cm KwK 39/1
Sockellafetten Ib	5 cm KwK 39
Sockellafetten Ic	5 cm KwK 39, KwK 39/1; 7.5 cm KwK 40, KwK 51, KwK 67, KwK 68
Sockellafetten Id	7.5 cm KwK 67
Sockellafetten IIa	8.8 cm KwK 43, PAK 43
Sockellafetten III	7.5 cm KwK 42

These guns were initially fitted with protective shields, but as the war situation deteriorated and resources became scarce, these shields were omitted. The mountings were installed in purpose-built bunkers when possible, but more commonly positioned in open defensive pits.

=== Production and deployment ===
The 5 cm Sockellafetten Ia and Ib mountings were used extensively throughout the Atlantic Wall fortifications. As Allied armor improved and the effectiveness of 5 cm guns declined, the KwK 67 and KwK 68 upgrade program was implemented.

Official German records indicate that on 18 January 1945, plans existed to install 132 KwK 67 guns along the West Wall (Siegfried Line). However, the same report noted that none had been delivered by that date. Limited evidence suggests some KwK 67 guns may have been deployed in eastern defensive lines, while no evidence exists for any KwK 68 production or deployment.

=== West Wall Dispositions as at 18 January 1945 ===
Gun type	Mounting	Assigned	Deployed	Combat ready
8.8 cm KwK 43/3	Sockellafetten IIa	418	308	153
8.8 cm KwK 42	Sockellafetten IIa	50	—	—
7.5 cm KwK 67	Sockellafetten Ic	132	0	0
5 cm KwK 39/1	Sockellafetten Ia	200	150	20
7.5 cm KwK 51	Sockellafetten Ic	168	0	0

=== Historical context ===
By late 1944 and early 1945, Germany's industrial capacity was severely compromised, resulting in incomplete and often contradictory documentation regarding these weapon systems. The collapse of German manufacturing capability meant that many planned defensive weapons, including the KwK 67 and KwK 68, existed primarily on paper rather than in meaningful numbers.

The term "reboring" found in some historical sources has caused confusion among researchers. In the context of these weapons, it referred to complete barrel replacement with new designs rather than modification of existing barrels.

== See also ==
- 5 cm Pak 38
- 7.5 cm Pak 40
- 7.5 cm Pak 97/38
- 7.5 cm Infanteriegeschütz 37
- 7.5 cm Infanteriegeschütz 42
