= 7.5 cm leichtes Infanteriegeschütz 18 =

German WWII infantry gun

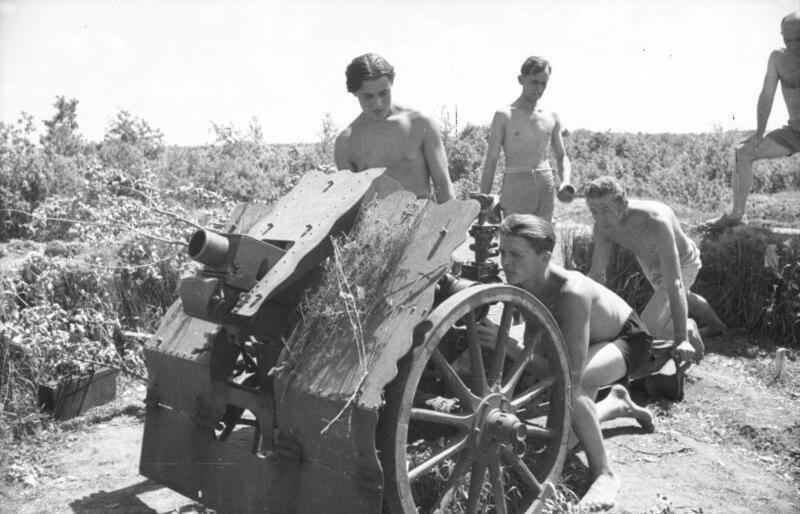
- Type: Infantry support gun
- Place of origin: Germany

Service history
- In service: 1932–1945
- Used by: See § Users
- Wars: Second Sino-Japanese War; World War II

Production history
- Designer: Rheinmetall-Borsig
- Designed: 1927
- Manufacturer: Rheinmettal-Borsig
- No. built: 9,037 (1939–1945)
- Variants: See § Variants

Specifications
- Mass: 400 kg (880 lb)
- Length: 884 mm (34.8 in)
- Barrel length: 783 mm (30.8 in)
- Shell: HE, HEAT, smoke
- Shell weight: 6 kg (13 lb) (HE)
- Caliber: L/11.8
- Action: Top break
- Recoil: Hydropneumatic
- Carriage: Box trail
- Elevation: -10° to +75°
- Traverse: 12°
- Rate of fire: 8−12 rpm
- Muzzle velocity: 222 m/s (730 ft/s)
- Maximum firing range: 3.5 km (2.2 mi)

The 7.5 cm leichtes Infanteriegeschütz 18 (7.5 cm le.IG 18) was an infantry support gun of the German Wehrmacht used during World War II.

== Background ==
The le.IG 18 design was influenced by the lessons learned from World War I. During the conflict the infantry found that divisional artillery often failed to destroy enemy positions in close combat, leading to the use of portable artillery pieces such as the 7.58 cm Minenwerfer. In 1927, Rheinmetall-Borsig began working on a replacement originally known as the 7.5 cm leichtes Minenwerfer 18 before it was formally adopted by the Reichswehr as the 7.5 cm leichtes Infanteriegeschütz 18 in 1932.

== Description ==
The le.IG 18 is a light gun with a short barrel. The breech was unique, using a 'shotgun' style mechanism: when the breech lever is operated, the top part of the breech remains open until a fresh shell is loaded; the rim of the shell case forces the mechanism to close the top part under its own weight. The carriage is a simple box trail with a spade traversing across the axle and could be fitted with a gun shield to protect the crew. A hydropneumatic recoil system is located beneath the barrel. Two versions were made: one with wooden spoken wheels for horse towing and other with steel discs with pneumatic tires for motorized towing.

== History ==
The le.IG 18 was first used in combat by the Nationalist government of China during the Second Sino-Japanese War. In 1934 the Chinese purchased twenty guns, but these were ultimately lost early in the war, possibly during the Battle of Shanghai in 1937.

Prior to World War II, Rheinmetall developed a possible replacement known as the 7.5 cm leichtes Infanteriegeschütz L/13, with a longer barrel, a conventional sliding block breech with a hydrospring recoil system, and steel disc wheels with solid rubber tires. But after trials, the Heer decided to stick with the le.IG 18, which remained the standard infantry support gun until the end of the war. It was also the most built German artillery piece during the war except for the 10.5 cm leFH 18. Specialized variants for mountain troops and paratroopers were also developed, but neither were built in large numbers. According to Zaloga, a total of 9,037 guns were produced between 1939 and 1945.

During the post-war period, Guatemala under the rule of president Jacobo Arbenz Guzmán purchased and received reportedly 2,000 tons of largely obsolete weapons from Czechoslovakia including several batteries of le.IG 18 guns in May 1953, these guns remained in service as late as 1984.

== Variants ==
- 7.5 cm le.IG 18 Bespg. − Horse-drawn variant with wooden spoked wheels for towing
- 7.5 cm le.IG 18 Kfz. − Variant with steel wheels and pneumatic tires for motorized towing
- 7.5 cm le.GebIG 18 − Mountain gun variant capable of being broken into ten loads carried by the crew or six loads for mule transport
- 7.5 cm le.IG 18F − Airborne variant intended to equip Fallschirmjäger units. It was capable of being broken down into four loads weighing about 140 kg (310 lb) each. It was practically the mountain gun version but with smaller steel disc wheels instead of spoked wheels

== Gallery ==
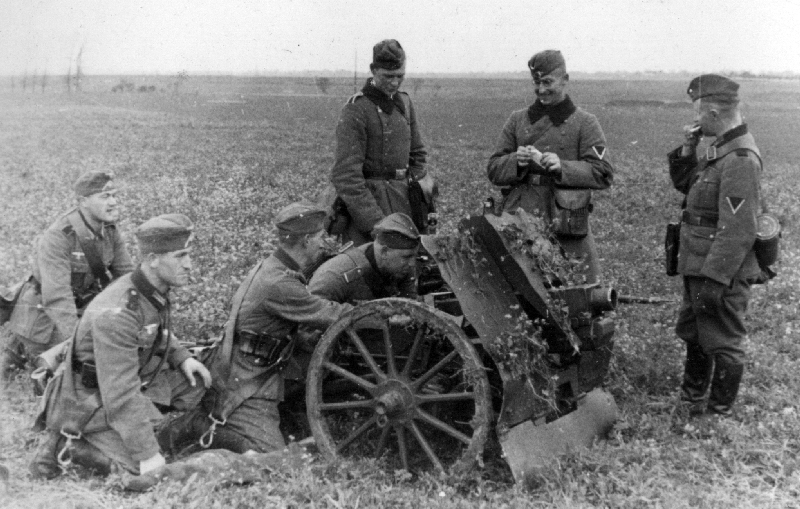
Crew training with a le.IG 18

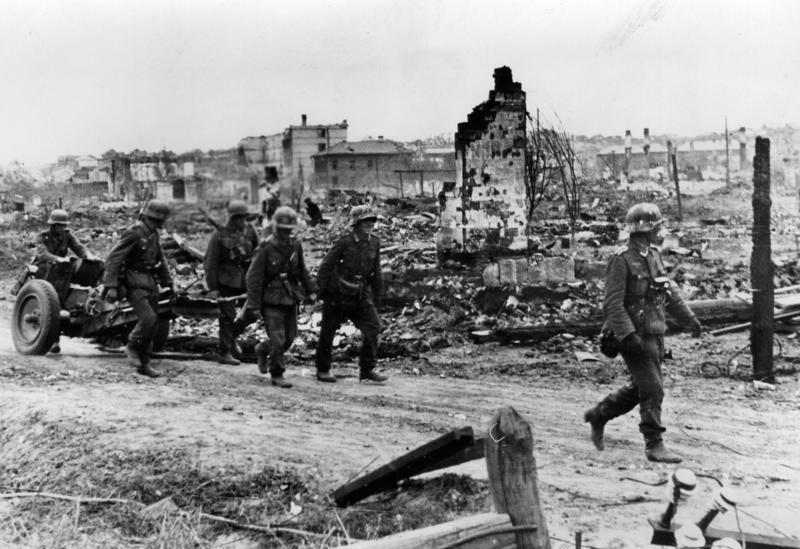
Crew towing a gun during the Battle of Stalingrad

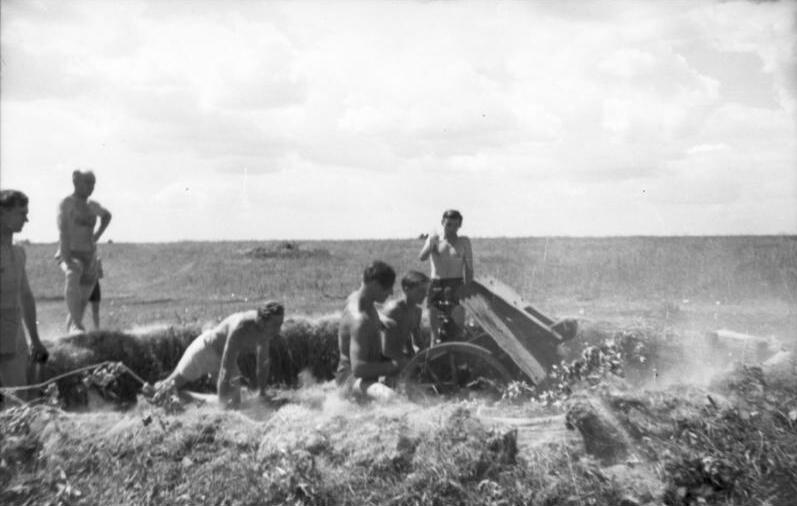
A gun in central or southern Russia

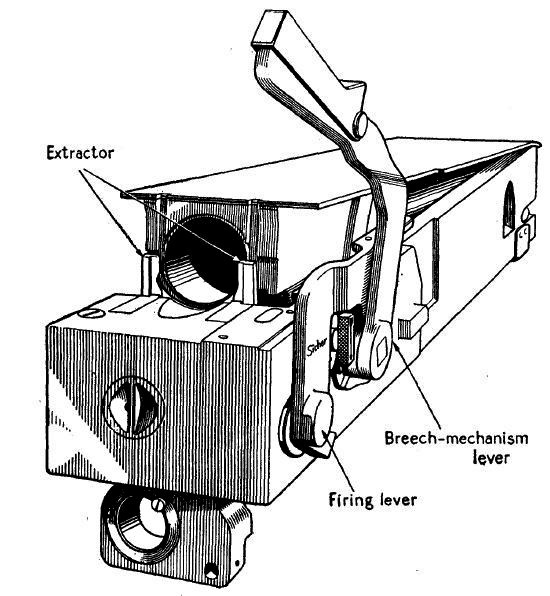
The gun's breech

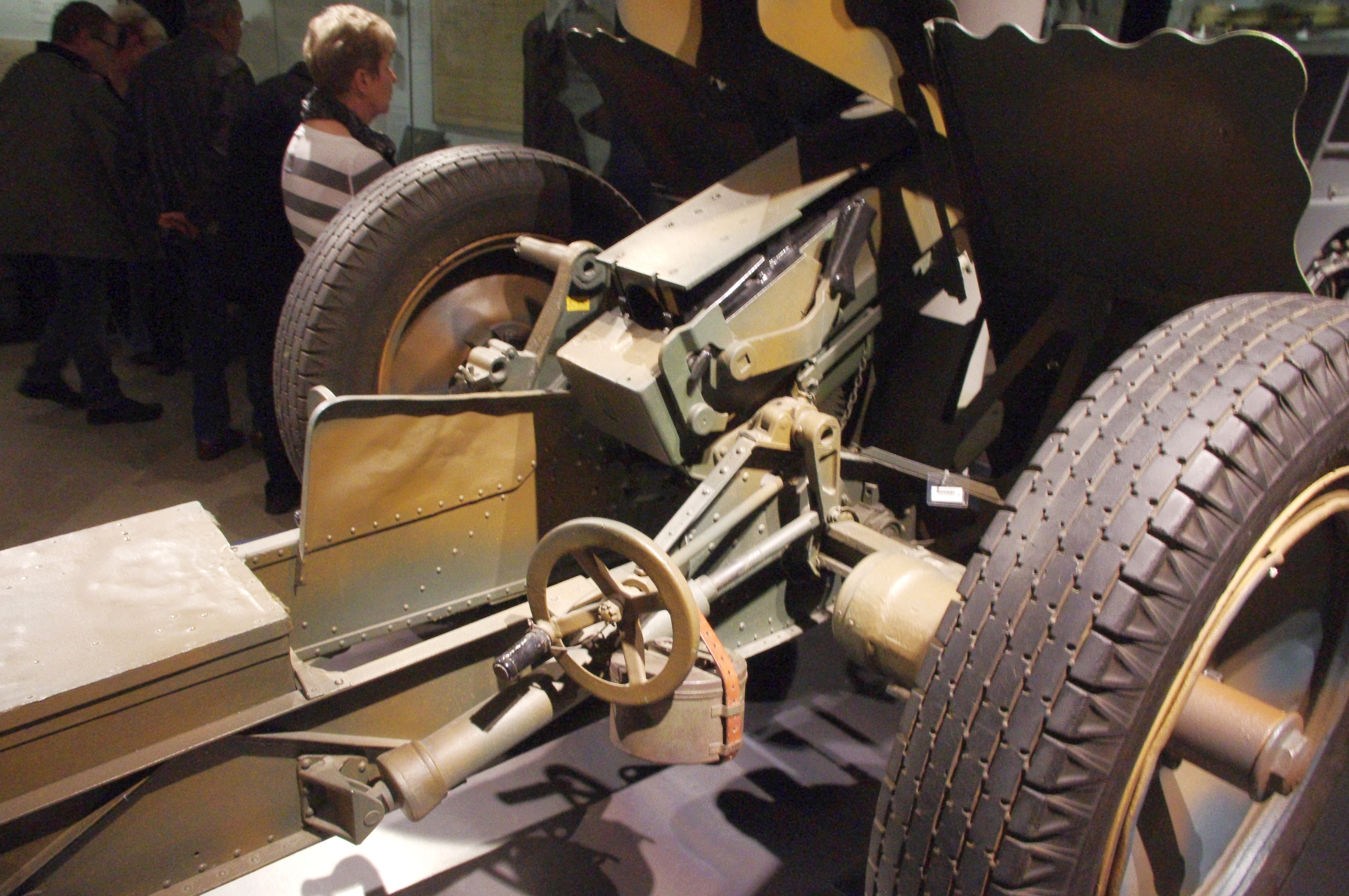
Rear of 7.5 cm leichtes Infanteriegeschütz 18

== Users ==
- China − 20 purchased in 1934
- Weimar Republic
- Nazi Germany
- Guatemala − Received in 1953 from Czechoslovakia, remained in use as late as 1984

== See also ==
- 7.5 cm Infanteriegeschütz 37
- 7.5 cm Infanteriegeschütz 42
- Artillery
- List of artillery
