= 7.5 cm FK 7M85 =

7.5 cm Feldkanone 7M85
- Type: Field gun
- Place of origin: Nazi Germany

Service history
- In service: 1945
- Used by: Nazi Germany
- Wars: World War II

Production history
- Designed: 1944–45
- Produced: 1945
- No. built: Between 10 and 110

Specifications
- Mass: 1,788 kg (3,942 lbs)
- Barrel length: 3.45 m (11 ft 4 in); 3.7 m (12 ft 2 in) (with muzzle brake)
- Shell: Fixed QF 75 x 690mm R
- Shell weight: HE: 5.4 kilograms (12 lb); AP: 6.8 kilograms (15 lb)
- Caliber: 75 mm (2.95 in)
- Breech: semi-automatic horizontal sliding-block
- Carriage: split trail
- Elevation: -5° to +42°
- Traverse: 30° 30'
- Rate of fire: 12–15 rpm
- Muzzle velocity: HE: 550 m/s (1,804 ft/s)
- Maximum firing range: 10,275 m (11,237 yds)
- Filling: TNT or amatol

The 7.5 cm Feldkanone 7M85 (7.5 cm FK 7M85) was a field gun used by Germany in World War II.

== Design ==
The FK 7M85 was designed to a requirement issued in 1944 for a dual-purpose anti-tank and field gun that could be produced quickly. The gun, cradle and recoil system from the 7.5 cm PaK 40 anti-tank gun was adapted to the 10.5 cm leFH 18/40 carriage. The leFH 18/40 carriage had been itself adapted from the PaK 40 so this design essentially returned the carriage to its original gun, albeit with a wider range of ammunition and an extra 20° of elevation.

It is possible the FK 7M85 was influenced by the success of Soviet divisional guns such as M1936, M1939 and M1942, which the Germans captured in substantial numbers earlier in the war. At 1,780 kg (3,924 lb), it was 355 kg (782 lb) heavier than the PaK 40, 664 kg (1,464 lb) heavier than the Soviet M1942 and 264 kg (582 lb) heavier than the 7.5 cm FK 16 nA, which it would have replaced. This would have made manhandling the FK 7M85 into position in snow and mud difficult. However, the anti-tank performance of the 75 x 690 mm shell would have been greater than the 75 × 200 mm shell fired by the FK 16 NA or the 76.2 × 385 mm shell fired by the Soviet divisional guns.

== Nomenclature ==
In 1944–45, the Germans changed their system of artillery designations from the old "year" system. Each weapon was to have a number showing their caliber group, a letter denoting the ammunition group, and the last two digits were from the weapon drawing number. In this case, 7 denoted 75 mm caliber using the M group of ammunition. The shells were all to be designated as M with a 4-digit number, the first three were the drawing number and the last was the shell's category from the following list:

| No. | Shell type | No. | Shell type |
|---|---|---|---|
| 1 | high explosive | 6 | gas |
| 2 | hollow charge anti-tank | 7 | incendiary |
| 3 | armor-piercing | 8 | leaflet |
| 4 | high explosive, high capacity | 9 | practice |
| 5 | smoke | 10 | proof projectile |
