= List of battles with most Romanian military fatalities =

This article contains a list of battles and military campaigns with most Romanian military deaths.

== Introduction ==
This article lists battles and campaigns in which the number of Romanian military fatalities exceed 1,000. The term casualty in warfare refers to a soldier who is no longer fit to fight after being in combat. Casualties can include killed, wounded, missing, captured or deserted.

== Battles ==
| Battle or siege | Conflict | Date | Estimated number killed | Opposing force | References |
|---|---|---|---|---|---|
| Siege of Odessa | World War II | August 8 to October 16, 1941 | 17,729 killed | Soviet Union | |
| Battle of Mărășești | World War I | August 6 to September 3, 1917 | 5,125 killed | (German Empire) Germany; Austria-Hungary | |
| Battle of Mirăslău | Long Turkish War | September 18, 1600 | Over 5,000 killed | Holy Roman Empire | |
| Siege of Sevastopol (1941–1942) | World War II | October 30, 1941 to July 4, 1942 | 1,597 killed | Soviet Union | |
| Battle of the Argeș | World War I | December 1 to 3, 1916 | Over 1,000 killed | (German Empire) Germany; Austria-Hungary (Tsardom of Bulgaria (1908–1946)) Bulgaria; Ottoman Empire | |
| Battle of Finta | War for the succession to the throne of Moldavia | May 27, 1653 | 1,000 killed | Moldavia; Cossack Hetmanate; Crimean Khanate; German and Austrian mercenaries | |

== Campaigns ==
| Campaign | Conflict | Date | Estimated number killed | Opposing force | References |
|---|---|---|---|---|---|
| Romanian Campaign | World War I | August 27, 1916 to December 1917 (first phase); November 10 to 11, 1918 (second phase) | 335,706 killed | (German Empire) Germany; Austria-Hungary (Tsardom of Bulgaria (1908–1946)) Bulgaria; Ottoman Empire | |
| Operation Barbarossa | World War II | June 22 to December 5, 1941 | At least 39,000 killed | Soviet Union | |
| Crimean offensive | World War II | April 8 to May 12, 1944 | 25,800 killed | Soviet Union | |
| Operation München (Part of Operation Barbarossa) | World War II | July 2 to 26, 1941 | 4,112 killed | Soviet Union | |
| Southern Dobruja Offensive | Second Balkan War | July 10 to 18, 1913 | 1,600 killed | (Tsardom of Bulgaria (1908–1946)) Bulgaria | |
