= 7.5 cm Infanteriegeschütz 37 =

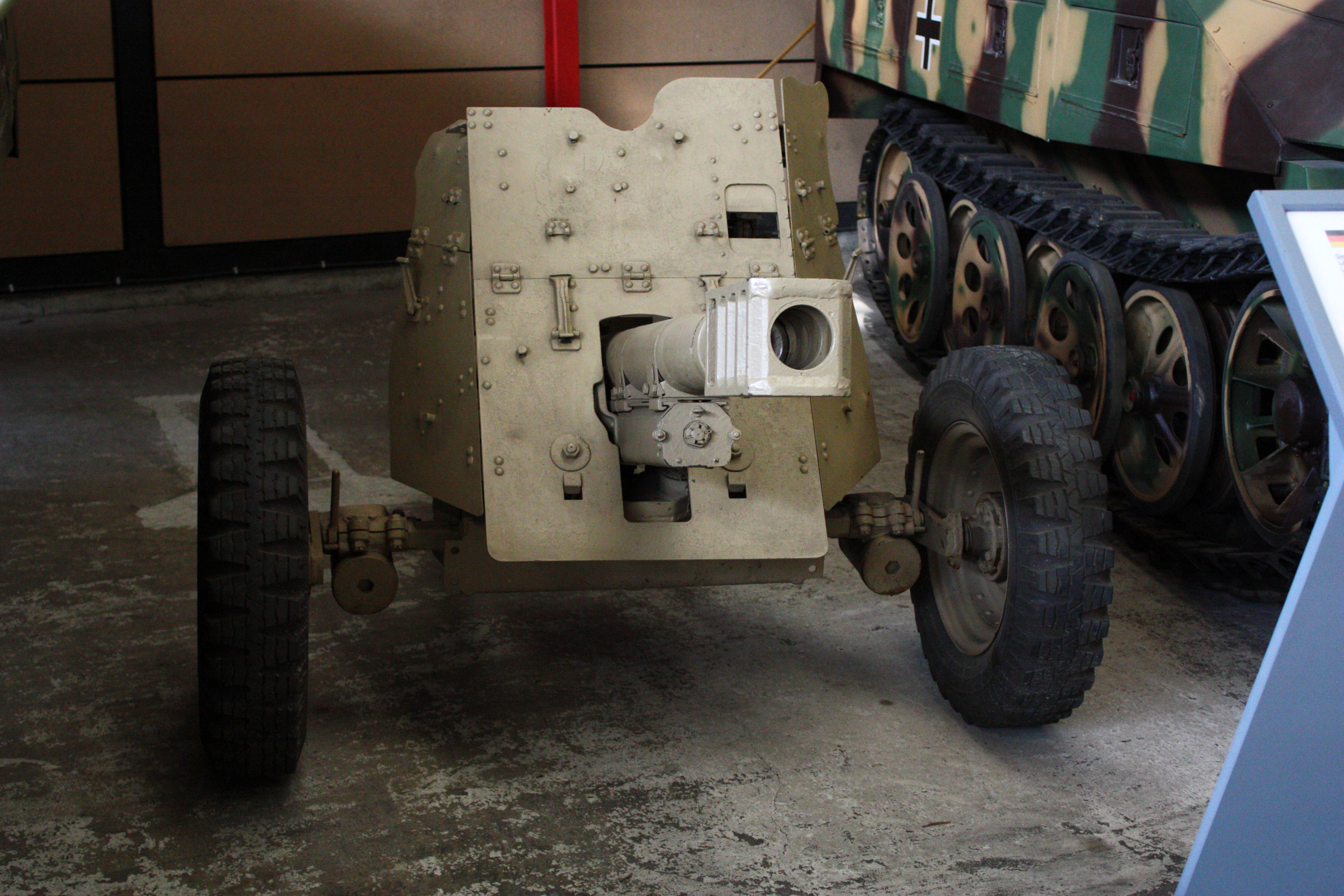
- At the Panzermuseum Munster
- Type: Infantry support gun
- Place of origin: Nazi Germany

Service history
- Used by: Nazi Germany

Production history
- Produced: May - December 1944
- No. built: 2,278

Specifications
- Mass: 510 kg (1,120 lb)
- Barrel length: 1.8 m (5 ft 11 in) L/22
- Shell: Fixed QF 75 x 89 mm R
- Shell weight: 5.45 kg (12 lb)
- Caliber: 75 mm (2.95 in)
- Elevation: −10° to +40°
- Traverse: 60°
- Muzzle velocity: 280 m/s (920 ft/s) (common); 395 m/s (1,300 ft/s) (anti-tank)
- Maximum firing range: 5.15 km (3.2 mi)

The 7.5 cm Infanteriegeschütz 37 (7.5 cm IG 37) was an infantry support gun, used by Germany during World War II. The guns were originally designated 7.5 cm PaK 37. The IG 37s were manufactured from carriages of 3.7 cm Pak 36s (and the nearly identical Soviet 3.7 cm PaK 158(r)) and a barrel designed originally for the IG 42 infantry support gun. As an anti-tank weapon it used a hollow charge shell with 0.5 kg (1 lb 2 oz) of explosives to penetrate up to 85 mm (3.3 in) with a velocity of 395 m/s (1,300 ft/s). The first 84 guns were delivered in June 1944. By the end of the war 1,304 guns were operational.

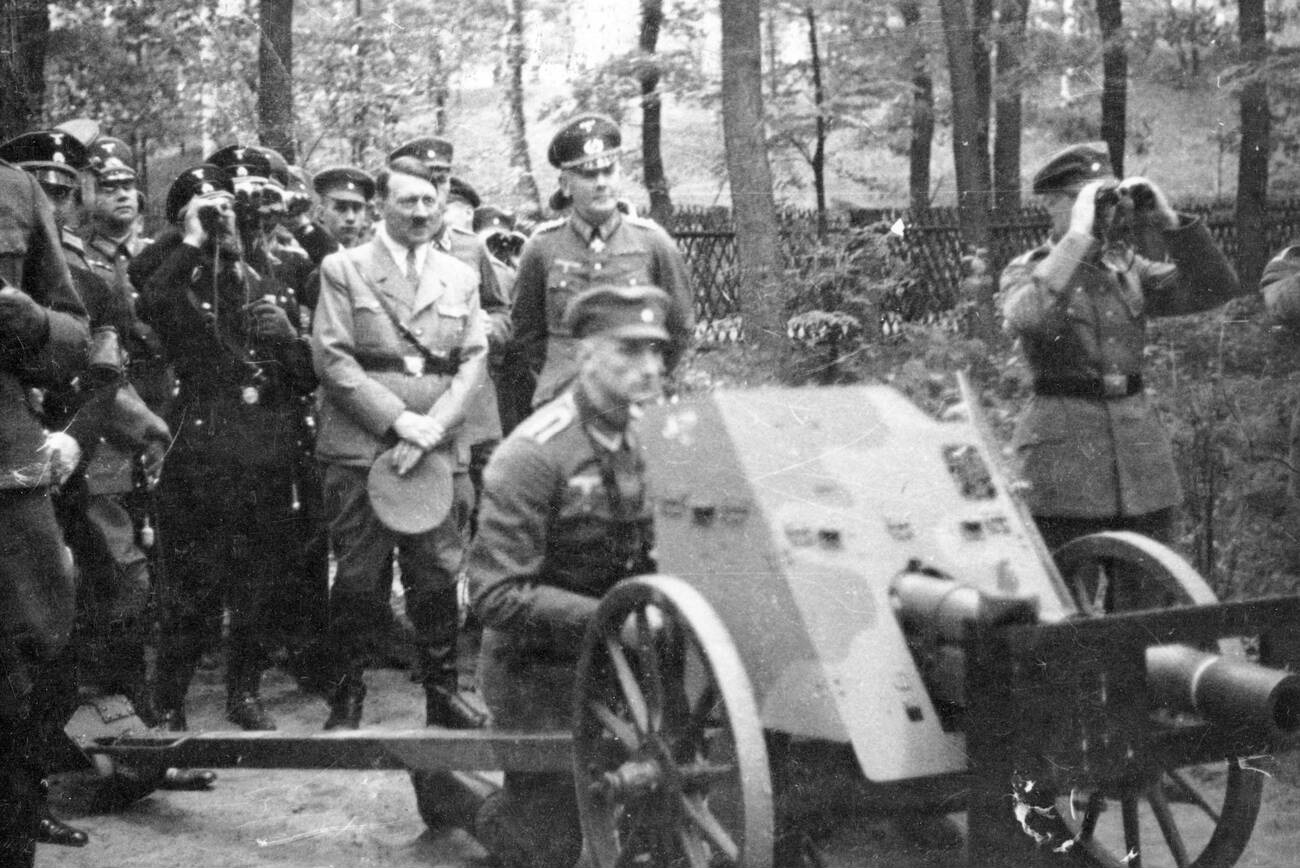
Adolf Hitler reviews a 7.5 cm IG 37 gun c. 1940.

While the gun carriage was an old design, the gun itself was a new design created by Krupp, though the design had been shelved at the time of its conception. The gun has two distinctive features: the first is the large four-baffle muzzle brake and the second is the vertical sliding-block breech that was considered unusual for a Krupp designed gun. The breech operates in a semi-automatic fashion, in that once the gun was fired the breech block would open and eject the spent casing and remained open to allow for rapid reloading. The breech would then be closed once the next round was loaded and the gun was then ready to fire.

== See also ==
- 7.5 cm leichtes Infanteriegeschütz 18
- 7.5 cm Infanteriegeschütz 42
- Artillery
- List of artillery

== Sources ==
- http://www.lexikon-der-wehrmacht.de/Waffen/Infanteriegeschutze.htm (in German)
- Engelmann, Joachim and Scheibert, Horst. Deutsche Artillerie 1934-1945: Eine Dokumentation in Text, Skizzen und Bildern: Ausrüstung, Gliederung, Ausbildung, Führung, Einsatz. Limburg/Lahn, Germany: C. A. Starke, 1974
- Gander, Terry and Chamberlain, Peter. Weapons of the Third Reich: An Encyclopedic Survey of All Small Arms, Artillery and Special Weapons of the German Land Forces 1939-1945. New York: Doubleday, 1979 ISBN 0-385-15090-3
- Hogg, Ian V. German Artillery of World War Two. 2nd corrected edition. Mechanicsville, PA: Stackpole Books, 1997 ISBN 1-85367-480-X
