= 7.5 cm Infanteriegeschütz 42 =

- Type: Infantry support gun
- Place of origin: Nazi Germany

Service history
- Used by: Nazi Germany

Specifications
- Mass: 590 kg (1,300 lb)
- Barrel length: 1.6 m (5 ft 3 in) L/22
- Shell: Fixed QF 75 x 89 mm R
- Shell weight: 5.45 kg (12.0 lb)
- Caliber: 75 mm (2.95 in)
- Elevation: −6° to +32°
- Traverse: 78°
- Muzzle velocity: 280 m/s (920 ft/s)
- Maximum firing range: 5,150 m (5,630 yd)

The 7.5 cm Infanteriegeschütz 42 (7.5 cm IG 42) was an infantry support gun, used by Germany, during World War II. The requirement for this weapon came out of combat experience in 1940 when the existing IG 18 was felt to be outdated.

However, by the time Krupp had completed the design a hollow charge shell had been designed for the IG 18 and the gun was not put into production.

In 1944 the requirement was raised again and the barrel from the original design was mated with the carriage from the PAW 600 gun. An order was given for 1,450 guns.

The first IG 42s were delivered in October 1944 equipped with muzzle brakes. It is unclear how many were taken into service until the end of the war.

== See also ==
- 7.5 cm leichtes Infanteriegeschütz 18
- 7.5 cm Infanteriegeschütz 37
- Artillery
- List of artillery
