= 7.5 cm Pak 40 =

7.5 cm Panzerabwehrkanone 40
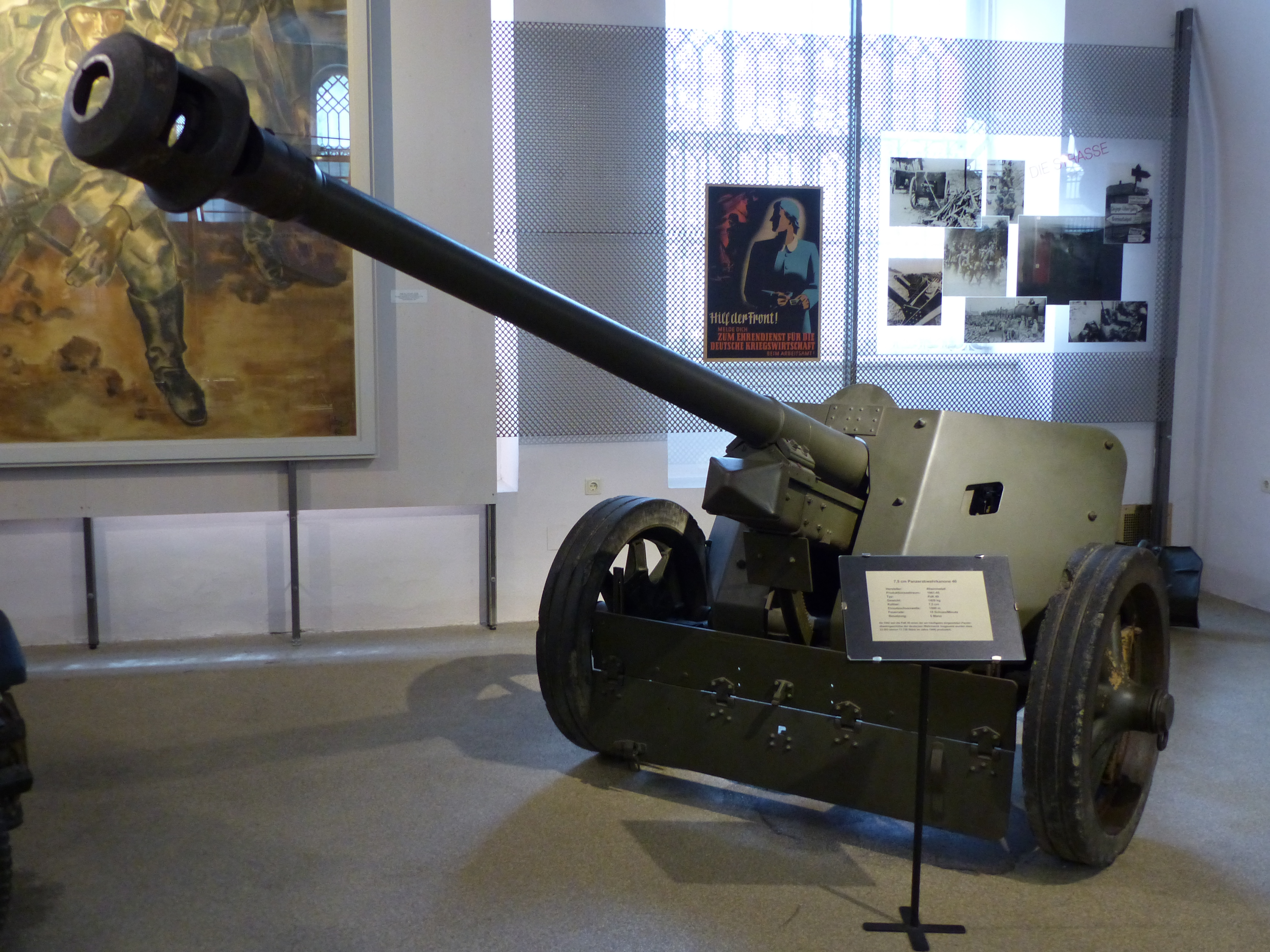
- A Pak 40 75 mm anti-tank gun, displayed in the Museum of Military History, Vienna.
- Type: Anti-tank gun
- Place of origin: Germany

Service history
- In service: 1942–1945
- Used by: See § Users
- Wars: World War II; Vietnam War; Indonesian invasion of East Timor

Production history
- Designer: Rheinmetall-Borsig AG
- Designed: 1939–1941
- Manufacturer: Rheinmetall-Borsig AG
- Unit cost: 2,200 man-hours 12,000 RM
- Produced: 1942–1945
- No. built: 23,303

Specifications
- Mass: 1,425 kg (3,142 lb) in action
- Length: 6.2 m (20 ft 4 in)
- Barrel length: 46 calibres: 3.45 m (11 ft 4 in)
- Width: 2.08 m (6 ft 10 in)
- Height: 1.2 m (3 ft 11 in)
- Crew: 6
- Shell: Fixed QF 75×714mm R
- Caliber: 75 mm (2.95 inch)
- Breech: semi-automatic horizontal sliding-block
- Recoil: Hydro-pneumatic
- Carriage: Split trail
- Elevation: −5° to +22°
- Traverse: 65°
- Rate of fire: 14 rounds per minute
- Effective firing range: 1,800 m (1,969 yd) direct fire
- Maximum firing range: 7,678 m (8,397 yd) indirect HE shell

The 7.5 cm Pak 40 (7,5 cm Panzerabwehrkanone 40) was a German 75 millimetre anti-tank gun of the Second World War.

The gun was developed in 1939–1941 and entered service in 1942. With 23,303 examples produced, the Pak 40 formed the backbone of German anti-tank guns for the later part of World War II, mostly in towed form, but also on a number of self propelled artillery such as the Marder series of Panzerjäger.

A modified version of the gun designed specifically for vehicle-mounting was the 7.5 cm KwK 40, which differed primarily in using more compact ammunition, thereby allowing more rounds to be carried inside the vehicles. The KwK 40 armed many of the German mid-war tank designs such as the Panzer IV, as well as tank destroyer designs, replacing the Pak 40 in the latter role.

The Pak 40 may be referred to as the 7.5 cm L/46, referring to its calibre and the barrel's length in calibres. There were two versions of the KwK 40, which would be referred to as the 7.5 cm L/43 or 7.5 cm L/48.

== Development ==
Development of the Pak 40 began after reports of new Soviet tank designs began to reach Berlin in 1939. The German army was equipped with the 3.7cm Pak 36 at the time. A replacement 5 cm Pak 38 was still in testing at this point, but it appeared it would not be powerful enough to deal with these newer designs. Contracts were placed with Krupp and Rheinmetall to develop what was essentially a 7.5 cm version of the Pak 38. However, while the Pak 38 made extensive use of light alloys to reduce overall gun weight, these were now earmarked for aircraft production to supply the Luftwaffe. As a result, the Pak 40 used steel throughout its construction and was proportionally heavier than the 5 cm model. To simplify production, the Pak 38's curved gun shield was replaced by one using three flat plates. A version called the 7.5 cm FK 7M59 was proposed towards the end of the war to fill a dual-purpose role of field gun and anti-tank gun. The carriage was modified to provide +35° of elevation which increased maximum range to 13,300 m (14,500 yd). Another dual purpose variant was the 7.5 cm FK 7M85 which used the gun and recoil system of the Pak 40 on the carriage of the 10 cm le FH 18/40.

The project was initially given low priority, but following the invasion of the USSR in 1941 and the appearance of heavily armoured Soviet tanks such as the T-34 and KV-1, it was given an increased priority. The first production guns were delivered in February 1942. In April 1942, the Wehrmacht had 44 guns in service; by 1943, the Pak 40 formed the bulk of German anti-tank artillery.

== Operational use ==
The Pak 40 was the standard German anti-tank gun until the end of the war, and was supplied by Germany to its allies. Some captured guns were used by the Soviet Red Army.

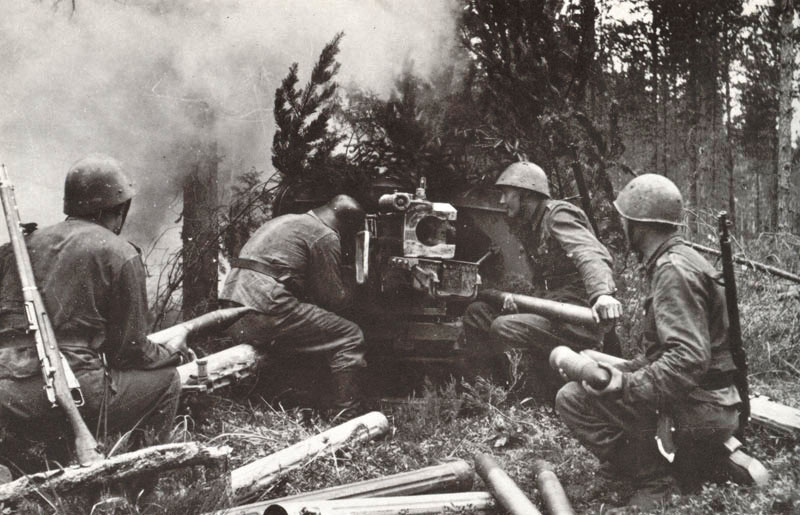
A Finnish army Pak 40 in firing position during the Continuation War

23,303 Pak 40s were produced, and about 3,500 more were used to arm tank destroyers. The unit manufacturing cost amounted to 2,200 man-hours at 12,000 RM. The usual prime movers were Opel Blitz lorry, Raupenschlepper Ost tracked tractor, SdKfz 11 medium halftrack and SdKfz 251 armoured halftrack.

A lighter version of the Pak 40 was used as the BK 7,5 automatic "weapon system" in the Henschel Hs 129B-3 and the Junkers Ju 88P-1 ground attack aircraft. This version of the Pak 40 was the heaviest of the Bordkanone series of heavy calibre aircraft guns, incorporating a twelve-round magazine. This version of the gun was also intended as a production fitment for a possible He 177A-3/R5 heavy bomber adaptation late in 1942, originally prototyped in the field with BK 5 cannons, themselves adapted from the 5 cm KwK 39 tank gun from the Panzer III.

During the second half of World War II, some Romanian anti-tank platoons each had three Pak 40 guns. These were used interchangeably with Romania's own 75 mm Reșița Model 1943 anti-tank gun.

Italy also received the Pak 40 from Germany since March 1943, the gun was renamed Cannone da 75/43 Mod.40, at least 66 guns were delivered before the Italian armistice.

== Performance ==
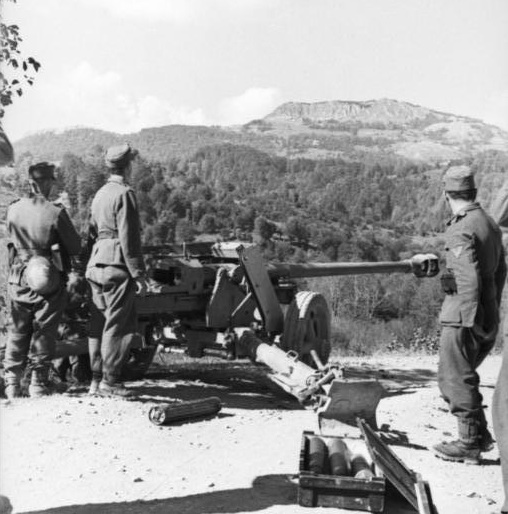
7,5 cm Pak 40 in Albania in 1943

The weapon was effective against almost every Allied tank until the end of the war, only struggling to penetrate heavier vehicles like the Russian IS tanks, the American M4A3E2 Sherman 'Jumbo' assault tank and M26 Pershing, (Note: The M26 did not reach the European theatre until January 1945 and only 200 were issued to units.) and later variants of the British Churchill tank.

The Pak 40 was much heavier than the Pak 38; its decreased mobility meant that it was difficult or even impossible to move without an artillery tractor on boggy ground. However, near Caen in June 1944, Oberfeldwebel Hans Erich Braun of Panzerjäger-Abteilung 38 of 2nd Pz div. reported about his battery supporting an attack by the 304th Pz Grenadier regiment near Caumont. Keeping up with the grenadiers, Braun's men moved their remaining two guns by hand through incredibly difficult terrain.

The Pak 40 was first used in the USSR where it was needed to combat the newest Soviet tanks. It was designed to fire the same low-capacity APCBC, HE and HL projectiles that had been standardized for use in the long barrelled Kampfwagenkanone KwK 40 tank-mounted guns of the mid-war and later marks of the Panzer IV medium tank. In addition, there was an APCR shot (Panzergranate 40) for the Pak 40, a munition which - reliant on supplies of tungsten - eventually became very scarce. (Note: One document, "Terminal Ballistics" stipulates production of Panzergranate 40 ceased entirely in 1943.) According to the German Panzertruppen news journal, 5,000 APCR rounds were expected in Dec. 1942 as replenishment for the Winter offensive.

The main differences amongst the rounds fired by 75 mm German guns were in the length and shape of the cartridge cases as well as the primers used. The 7.5 cm KwK 40 (75x495mm) used in tanks had a fixed cartridge case twice the length of that used by the 7.5 cm KwK 37, the short barrelled 75 mm used on earlier tanks, and the 7.5 cm Pak 40 cartridge was a third longer than that used by the KwK 40. The Pak 40 used a percussion primer, while the vehicle mounted 75 mm guns used electrical primers. Other than minor differences with the projectiles' driving bands, all German 75 mm guns used the same 75mm projectiles.

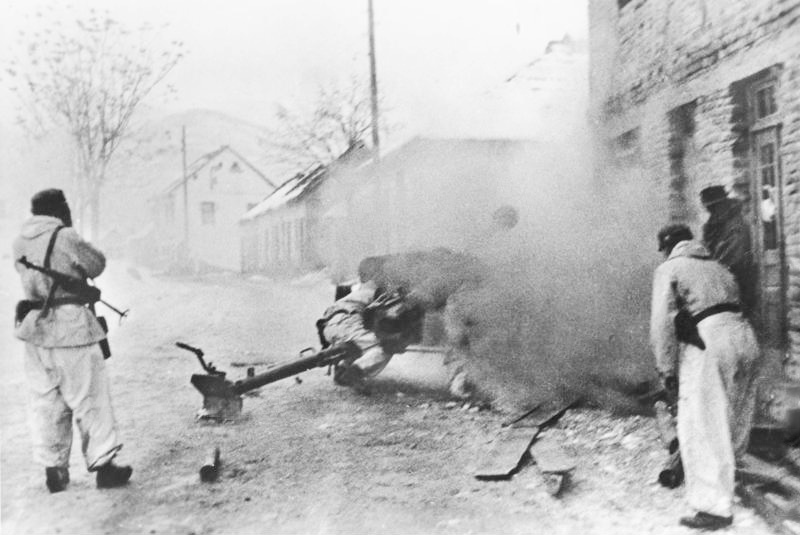
German Panzerjäger use a Pak 40 against Yugoslav partisans in Bosnia on 12 January 1944.

The longer cartridge case of the Pak 40 allowed a larger charge to be used and a higher velocity for the PzGr 39 armour-piercing capped ballistic cap round to be achieved. The muzzle velocity was about 790 m/s (2,600 ft/s) as opposed to 740 m/s (2,400 ft/s) for the KwK 40 L/43 and 750 m/s (2,500 ft/s) for the L/48. The only 75mm fighting vehicle gun in general use by Germany that possessed a longer barrel than the Pak 40, the 7.5 cm KwK 42 on the Panther tank, could achieve a higher muzzle velocity of 935 m/s (3,070 ft/s) using more propellant in a larger cartridge fixed to it for the KwK 42's use.

For unknown reasons, some 75 mm APCBC cartridges appear to have been produced with a charge that gave a muzzle velocity of about 770 m/s (2,500 ft/s). The first documented firing by the US of a Pak 40 recorded an average muzzle velocity of 776 m/s for its nine most instrumented firings. Probably because of these results, period intelligence publications ("Handbook on German Military Forces") gave about 770 m/s as the Pak 40 APCBC muzzle velocity. Post-war publications corrected this.

German sources differ; the Official Firing Table document for the 75 mm KwK 40, StuK 40 and the Pak 40 dated October, 1943, gives 770 m/s on one of the APCBC tables.

== General characteristics ==
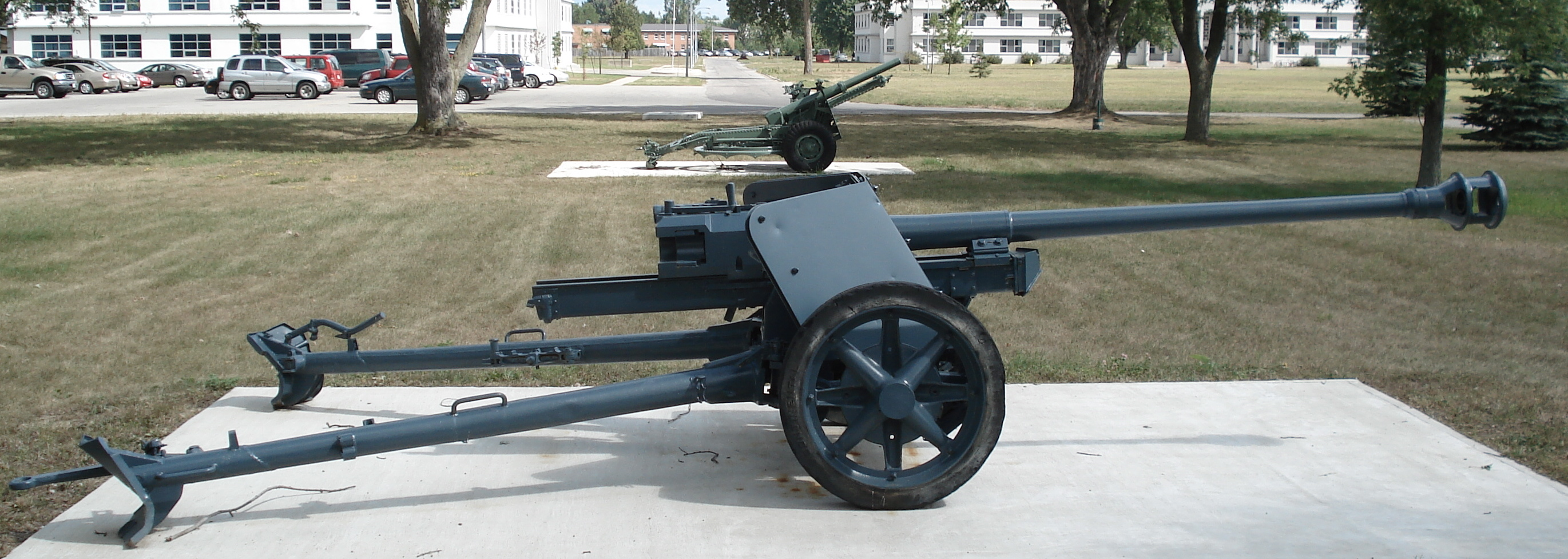
A Pak 40 displayed at Base Borden Military Museum, Canada, 2006

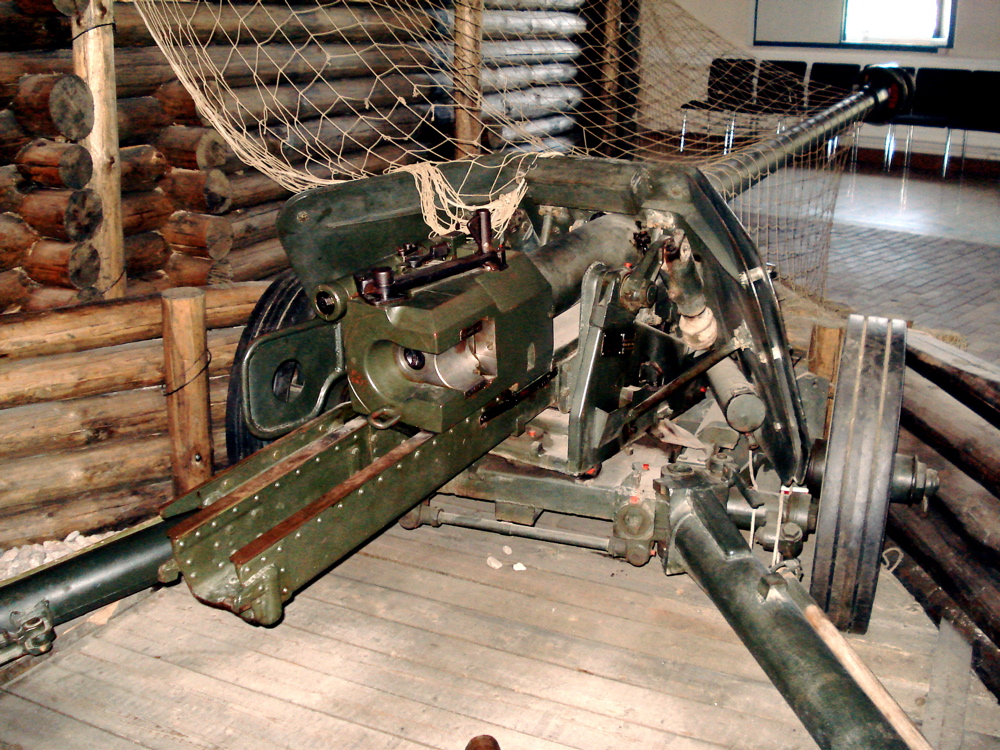
Pak 40 seen from the rear

- Caliber: 75 mm
- Barrel length: L/46
- Rifling: 32 grooves, right-hand increasing twist, 1/24 to 1/18.
- Length with the carriage: 6.2 metres (20 ft 4 in)
- Length: 3.70 metres (12 ft 1.7 in)
- Width: 2.0 metres (6 ft 7 in)
- Height: 1.25 metres (4 ft 1 in)
- Weight (combat ready): 1,425 kilograms (3,142 lb)
- Traverse: 65°
- Elevation: -5° to + 22°
- Rate of fire: 14 rounds per minute
- Engagement range: 1,800 metres (5,906 ft)
- Indirect range: 7,678 metres (25,190 ft) (HE shell)
- Projectile weight: 3.18 to 6.8 kg (7 lb 0.2 oz to 14 lb 15.9 oz)

== Ammunition ==
Panzergranate 39 (PzGr. 39)

An armour-piercing, capped, ballistic cap (APCBC) projectile with explosive filler and tracer.

- Weight of projectile: 6.80 kg (15 lb 0 oz)
- Muzzle velocity: 790 m/s

Panzergranate 40 (PzGr. 40)

An armour-piercing, composite rigid (APCR) projectile with a sub-calibre tungsten core.

- Weight of projectile: 4.05 kg (8 lb 15 oz)
- Muzzle velocity: 990 m/s

Panzergranate 38 HL/B (PzGr. 38 HL/B)

A high-explosive anti-tank (HEAT) projectile with a shaped charge.

- Weight of projectile: 4.57 kg
- Muzzle velocity: 450 m/s

Penetration at 30 degrees from vertical
	Range			
Round	100 m	500 m	1000 m	1500 m
PzGr. 39	108 mm	96 mm	80 mm	64 mm
PzGr. 40	143 mm	120 mm	97 mm	77 mm
PzGr. 38 HL/B	75 mm	75 mm	75 mm	75 mm

Penetration of armour 90 degrees incidence at 500 m
Round	Muzzle velocity	Penetration
Armour-piercing (PzGr. 39)	792 m/s	132 mm
APCR (PzGr. 40)	933 m/s	154 mm
HE	550 m/s	n/a

== Post-war use ==
After the war, the Pak 40 remained in service in several European armies, including Albania, Bulgaria, Czechoslovakia, Finland, Norway, Hungary and Romania. In 1955, the USSR supplied 33 captured guns to Austria. They were kept in service into the 1960s. North Vietnam also received some during the Vietnam War. Six ex-Portuguese Army Pak 40s divided into two artillery detachments were stationed in Dili during the Indonesian invasion of East Timor in 1975.

== Users ==
- Albania
- Bulgaria
- Czechoslovakia − Surplus guns inherited after the war.
- Finland − Designated as 75 K/40 and 75 PstK/40
- East Timor − ex-Portuguese guns.
- Nazi Germany
- Hungary
- Israel − Supplied by Czechoslovakia under the designation vz. 40 N.
- Italy − Designated as Cannone da 75/43 Mod.40.
  - Italian Social Republic
- Portugal
- Romania
- Syria
- Vietnam − Supplied by Soviet Union. Used as artillery and coastal guns.
- Yugoslavia

== Survivors ==
Pak 40s are or have been held in several military museums, outside museums or free entrance open-air fields:

- Royal Canadian Artillery Museum. CFB Shilo, Canada
- Hanko Front Line Museum. Hanko, Finland
- Veterans of Foreign Wars. Collingswood, New Jersey
- Privately Owned Collection. Uvalde, Texas
- Imperial War Museum. Duxford, England
- Museum of Artillery. Hanoi, Vietnam

== See also ==
- 7.5 cm Pak 97/38 – captured French 75 mm anti-tank gun on German carriage
- 7.5 cm Pak 41 – 75 mm anti-tank gun based on squeeze bore principle
- 7.5 cm Pak 50 – A shortened L/30 version of Pak 40
- 7.5 cm KwK 40 – German tank gun version of Pak 40
- 7.5 cm FK 7M85 – A field gun based on the Pak40

Weapons of comparable role, performance and era

- 3 inch Gun M5 – American anti-tank gun
- 75 mm Reșița Model 1943 – Romanian anti-tank gun
- Ordnance QF 17-pounder – British 17 pounder
- Cannone da 75/32 modello 37 – Italian 75mm gun
