= Battle of Carei =

1944 World War II battle in Romania

- Part of Battle of Romania, World War II
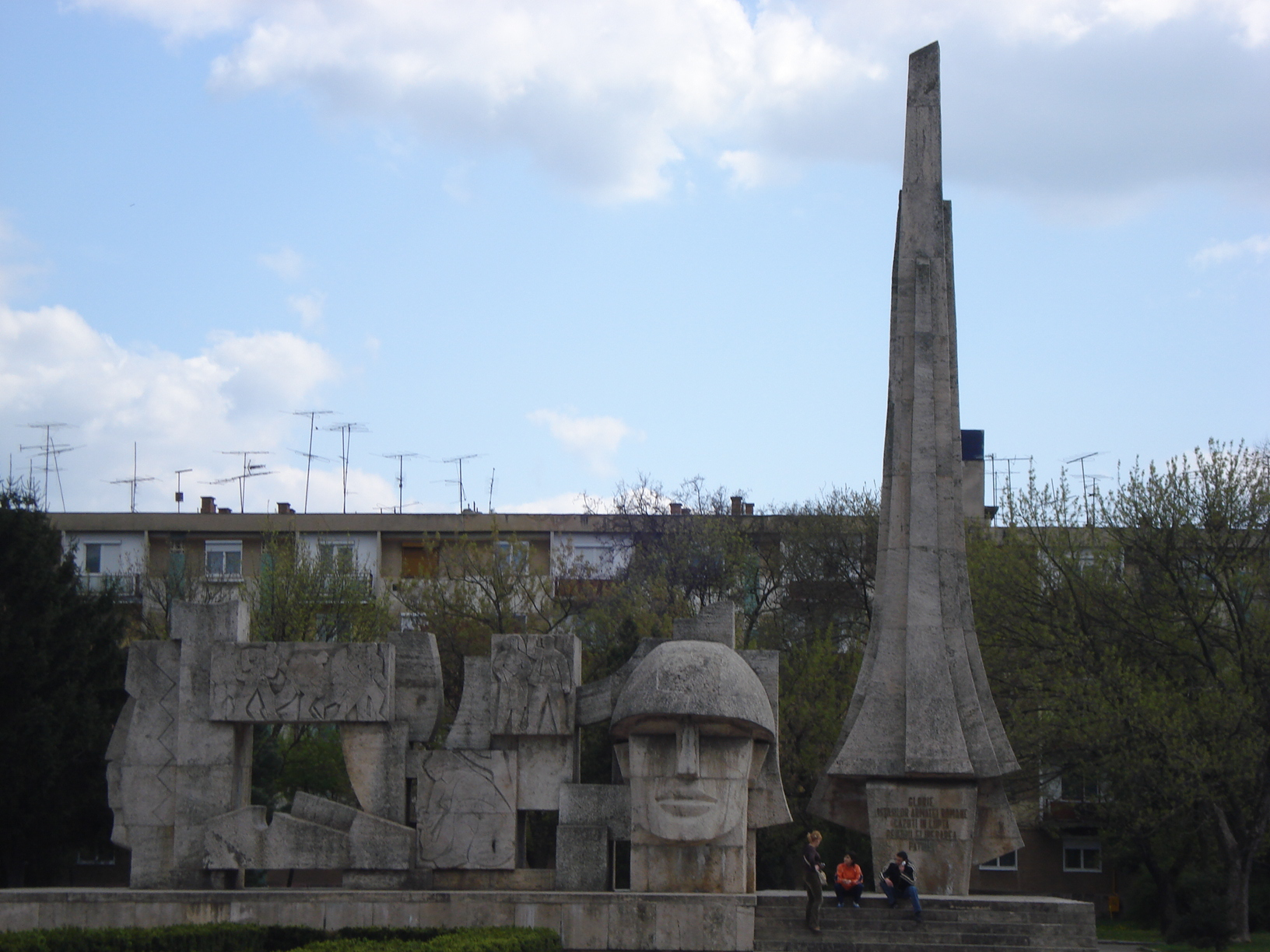
- Monument of the Romanian Soldier in Carei
Date	October 21–25, 1944
Location	Nagykároly, Szatmár County, Hungary, (now Carei, in Satu Mare County, Romania) 47°41′2″N 22°28′1″E
Result	Romanian victory De facto abrogation of the Second Vienna Award

Belligerents
Romania; Soviet Union	Hungary; Germany

Commanders and leaders
(Kingdom of Romania) Gheorghe Avramescu	(Kingdom of Hungary (1920–1946)) Jenő Major

Units involved
(Kingdom of Romania) 4th Army (Soviet Union) 40th Army (Kingdom of Romania) Gendarmerie	2nd Army

The Battle of Carei was the last stage of recovering Romania's former territory of Northern Transylvania, ceded in 1940 to Hungary as a result of the Second Vienna Award. The battle occurred towards the end of World War II, in the wider context of the Battle of Romania and the Battle of Debrecen. On October 25, 1944, the cities of Carei and Satu Mare were freed from Hungarian and German control. By a decree from 1959, this day was established as the Romanian Armed Forces Day.

== Prelude ==
On August 30, 1940, a territorial dispute between the Kingdom of Romania and the Kingdom of Hungary was arbitrated by Nazi Germany and Fascist Italy through the Second Vienna Award, which assigned the territory of Northern Transylvania, including all of Maramureș and part of Crișana, from Romania to Hungary. On June 22, 1941, Romania joined Operation Barbarossa in order to reclaim the lost territories of Bessarabia and Bukovina, which had been annexed by the Soviet Union in June 1940. As a result of the royal coup d'état of August 23, 1944, Romania switched sides and joined the Allies.

From September 5 to October 8, fierce fighting occurred at the Battle of Turda, where troops from the Hungarian 2nd Army under the command of General Lajos Veress and the German 8th Army under the command of General Mortimer von Kessel fought a defensive action against Romanian and Soviet forces. By mid-October, Brașov, Sfântu Gheorghe, Târgu Mureș, Gherla, Cluj, and Dej had been taken by the Allied forces.

== Battle ==
The offensive to retake the remaining corner of Northern Transylvania started on October 9, 1944, and was carried out by the Fourth Army, under the command of General Gheorghe Avramescu. In the first phase, which lasted until October 13, the Romanian troops entered the Someș Valley. In the second phase (October 14–20), they managed to cross the Meseș and Făget Mountains. The final phase of the offensive commenced on the morning of October 21. On October 22, the 2nd Army Corps advanced, with the 1st Cavalry Division entering Viile Satu Mare. Opposing them were troops of the Hungarian Second Army, led by General Jenő Major.

On the evening of October 24, the Romanian 6th Army Corps attacked in the direction of Carei with a force comprising 4 divisions. As highlighted by the Corps commander, General Emanoil Leoveanu, in his after-action report, the Romanian soldiers had to brave "the rains, the muddy ground, the very low and bad roads, the destroyed bridges, the mined roads". At the same time, the 2nd Infantry Division of 2nd Army Corps attacked in the direction of Satu Mare, in a pincer movement. By nightfall, the soldiers of the 9th Infantry Division entered in the city, where they engaged in street fighting; by the next morning, the Romanian Army was in control of it.

Units of the Romanian Gendarmerie participated in the fight. In the morning of October 25, a detachment of 5 gendarmes, led by second lieutenant Ioniță Borșan, hoisted the national flag on the obelisk in the centre of Carei, next to the cathedral. Soldiers of the 34th and 40th Regiments of the 9th "Mărășești" Infantry Division also participated in the raising of the flag.

The victory in the battle was dedicated to King Michael I of Romania, whose birthday was on October 25. For the duration of this campaign, which began on October 9 and lasted until October 25, the Romanian Army lost over 58,000 soldiers, dead, wounded, or missing.

== Commemoration ==
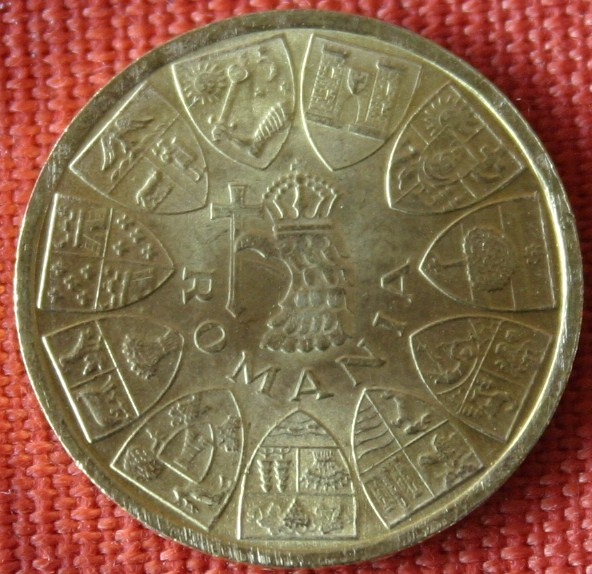
Romanian "Ardealul Nostru" gold jubilee medal from January 1945

The Romanian Armed Forces Day, which commemorates the Battle of Carei, was established by Decree nr. 381 of 1 October 1959, only after the end of the Soviet occupation of Romania in August 1958, and the process of de-Stalinization started by Gheorghe Gheorghiu-Dej earlier in 1959.

In memory of this battle, the "Monument of the Romanian Soldier" was erected in the center of Carei. Inaugurated in 1964, the monumental complex is the work of the sculptor Gheza Vida and the architect Anton Dâmboianu. Made of white stone, the monument is 18 m wide, 5 m deep, and 12 m high; it bears the inscription, "Glory to the soldiers of the Romanian Army, fallen in the struggles for the liberation of the homeland."

On January 15, 1945, a 20 lei jubilee medal, weighing 6.55 grams (0.231 oz) of 900 fine gold and bearing the inscription "Ardealul Nostru – 1601·1918·1944" was issued to commemorate the event. In October 2019, on the 75th anniversary of the Battle of Carei and the liberation of Northern Transylvania, the National Bank of Romania issued a commemorative 10 lei silver coin. The obverse of the coin shows the two sides of the gold jubilee medal, while the reverse shows the image of the Monument of the Romanian Soldier from Carei, with the inscription "Eliberarea Ardealului de Nord" in a circular arc, and the date on which the last piece of occupied Transylvanian territory was liberated, "October 25, 1944".

== See also ==
- World War II
- Romanian Land Forces
