= Gyorshadtest =

Former Hungarian military unit

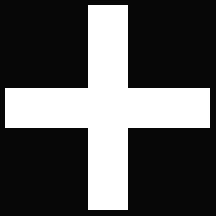
Roundel of the Hungarian Air Force, from 1942–1945

The Gyorshadtest (variously translated "Rapid Corps", "Fast Corps" or "Mobile Corps") was the most modern and best-equipped mechanized unit of the Royal Hungarian Army (Magyar Királyi Honvédség) at the beginning of World War II. However, the "Rapid Corps" name was something of a misnomer as it was only "mechanized" compared to other Hungarian units. The corps was not particularly mechanized when compared to similar units fielded by countries like Germany or the Soviet Union.

== Organization ==
=== The mechanized corps of the "Carpathian Group" ===
At the outset of the war, the Hungarian General Staff assembled a "strike force" consisting of VIII Corps, the 1st Mountain Brigade, the 8th Border Guard Brigade, and the "Rapid Corps" (Gyorshadtest). This 40,000-man strong elite "Rapid Corps" of two infantry brigades and the mechanized corps was collectively known as the "Carpathian Group" (Kárpát Csoport). (Note: The "Carpathian Group" (Kárpát Csoport) was a short-lived organization and was operational from 1 July to 7 July.) The commander of the "Carpathian Group" was Hungarian General (Vezérezredes) Ferenc Szombathelyi.

The "Carpathian Group" also included the integral 1st Air Force Field Brigade. This brigade included a collection of German and Italian-built aircraft. The brigade even included its own anti-aircraft gun units. On paper, the pilots of the 1st Air Force Field Brigade flew 18 Italian Fiat CR.32 and 18 Fiat CR.42 biplane fighters. They also had 18 Italian Caproni Ca. 135 bis transport/bombers, 18 German Junkers Ju 86 K-2 dive bombers, and 18 German Heinkel He 170A reconnaissance/bombers.

=== The commanders of the "Rapid Corps" ===
The "Rapid Corps" (and I Armoured Corps which succeeded it) had a total of four commanders from 1 March 1941 to 11 February 1945. The commanders were as follows:

- Major General Béla Miklós (1 March 1940 to 1 February 1942) – he was the first commander of the "Rapid Corps". Miklós was awarded a German Knight's Cross on 4 December 1941.
- No commander (1 February 1942 to 1 April 1942).
- Major General Jenő Major (1 April 1942 to 1 October 1942) – commander of the "Rapid Corps".
- Major General Lajos Veress (1 October 1942 to 15 September 1943) – On 1 October 1942 the name of the mechanized corps was changed to the "I Armored Corps".
- Major General Jenő Major (15 September 1943 to 16 October 1944) – second time commander, this time of the "I Armored Corps".
- Major General Ferenc Bisza (1 November 1944 to 11 February 1945) – he was the final commander of the "I Armored Corps".

=== The composition of the "Rapid Corps" ===
The 25,000-man strong "Rapid Corps" was organized as follows:

- 1st Motorized Brigade
- 2nd Motorized Brigade
- 1st Cavalry Brigade

Each of the two motorized brigades of the "Rapid Corps" had a "reconnaissance battalion" with obsolete light and medium tanks, which were extremely vulnerable to modern anti-tank weapons; two motorized infantry battalions; two bicycle infantry battalions; one 105mm howitzer battalion; and one antiaircraft battery. The necessary engineering, communication, and supply troops enabled the motorized brigades to perform as independent tactical units.

The cavalry brigade had two horse-mounted cavalry regiments; a reconnaissance battalion; two bicycle infantry battalions; and horse drawn as well as motorized artillery units, engineering, communication, and supply troops.

Directly subordinate to the commander of the "Rapid Corps" were two bicycle infantry battalions, two medium artillery batteries, seven antiaircraft batteries, additional communication, engineering and supply troops, and one air force regiment.

The mechanized corps looked impressive on paper as a strategic unit. There is no doubt that it included the most modern, best-equipped troops of the Royal Hungarian Army. In reality, it was not very effective against the more modern equipped Soviet motorized or tank corps, especially later in the war. Because of the military leadership's wish to see the Hungarian troops in action as soon as possible, the mechanized corps was ordered to begin its march-up before completing mobilization. Therefore, the effective force was only 75–80 per cent of projected strength. Cars and trucks requisitioned for military operations failed to arrive on time at the mobilization stations. The horses requisitioned for the cavalry were untrained for military service.

65 Italian Fiat L3 tankettes and 95 Hungarian Toldi I light/medium tanks were available. The L3s had two 8 mm machine guns in a fixed forward position. The L3s had no turret and were referred to as "tankettes" rather than light tanks. The Toldis were light tanks and had a 20 mm gun in a rotating turret. But this gun offered no serious armor-piercing capability. Overall, the armored Hungarian forces were of little value, especially against the more modern Soviet T-34 and KV tanks.

== Combat History ==
=== The "Rapid Corps" in Yugoslavia ===
The "Rapid Corps" was part of the Hungarian Third Army facing the Yugoslavian First Army during the invasion of Yugoslavia.

=== The "Carpathian Group" into action in Russia ===
On 1 July 1941, the German High Command directed that the two infantry brigades and one mechanized corps of the "Carpathian Group" be attached to General Carl-Heinrich von Stülpnagel's German 17th Army. As an attachment to the 17th Army, the "Carpathian Group" was to first attack and repel the 12th Soviet Army. The group was to then drive the Soviet troops from the Carpathian Mountains and pursue them to the Dniester River. The Hungarians were to deny the Soviets any opportunity to launch a counter-attack against the right flank of the advancing German 17th Army.

The Hungarian troops were to attack no less than eight Soviet divisions on a front almost 180 miles wide. The "Carpathian Group" had a total of about 40,000 armed men to do this. The Soviet forces on the defensive had about 56,000 men.

=== Plan 9 and the dissolution of the "Carpathian Group" ===
The German High Command's plan for the "Carpathian Group" to shield the right flank of the German 17th Army was known as "Plan 9". During the morning hours of 1 July 1941, the Hungarians launched an attack against the 12th Soviet Army per this plan and, on 7 July, the Mobile Corps reached the Dniester River. By 9 July, elements of the "Carpathian Group" had pushed the stoutly-resisting Soviet forces back and penetrated Russian territory to a depth of 60–70 miles. The group paid a high price in heavy losses to accomplish this.

Advancing on foot, the two infantry brigades (mountain and border guard) of the VIII Corps were unable to keep up with the "Rapid Corps". For this reason, Colonel-General Henrik Werth, the Hungarian Chief of Staff, dissolved the "Carpathian Group". Werth used the infantry brigades for policing and administrative duties of the occupied territory in Ukraine. He placed the "Rapid Corps" at the disposal of the German Army Group South (Heeresgruppe Sud). This army group was under the command of Field Marshal (Generalfeldmarschall) Gerd von Rundstedt. The Mobile Corps advanced with the German 17th Army, later the 1st Panzer Group, against the Soviet Southwestern Front.

=== The success of the "Rapid Corps" ===
By August 1941, the Hungarian mechanized corps was a key participant in the Battle of Uman. The "Rapid Corps" represented one half of a pincer which was enveloping the 6th Army and the 12th Army. The German 16th Panzer Division represented the other half of the pincer. On 3 August 1941, the pincer halves met and the 6th Army and the 12th Army were trapped. Over 100,000 Soviets were captured.

=== The Hungarian mechanized corps weakens ===
Even victories cost the Hungarians dearly. The "Rapid Corps" grew weaker in the summer of 1941. By comparison, the retreating Soviet armies, far from growing weaker, seemed to be growing stronger.

Aware of the general situation, Hungarian Regent Admiral Miklós Horthy and the rest of the Hungarian political leadership tried to gain the release of the battle weary troops in the "Rapid Corps". Henrik Werth, the pro-German Chief of Staff, was replaced on 5 September 1941 by Colonel-General Ferenc Szombathelyi. Unlike Werth, who supported the German offensive in Russia, Szombathelyi held the conviction that Hungarian troops should be employed only for the defense of Hungarian frontiers. Szombathelyi did not hesitate to communicate this view to the Germans. To force the Germans to release the "Rapid Corps", Szombathelyi neglected to replace either the armored vehicles or the personnel carriers and trucks that the corps had lost during the campaign. Even so, the Germans continued to utilize the weak Hungarian mechanized corps.

=== Another limited success ===
The German commanders typically allowed little room for the Hungarians to take independent action. However, the commander of the "Rapid Corps", Major General Bela Dalnoki-Miklos, did make an independent decision on at least one occasion. Making this decision, forced Dalnoki-Miklos to disobey direct orders from Field Marshal von Rundstedt.

On 19 October 1941, after the Battle of Kiev, General Carl-Heinrich von Stülpnagel's German 17th Army was advancing through Poltava towards Voroshilovgrad. Facing von Stülpnagel were elements of the Soviet 18th Army. Field Marshal von Rundstedt had ordered von Stülpnagel to order the Hungarian mechanized corps to break through the Soviet defenses directly in his way. As he was told, Stülpnagel ordered Dalnoki-Miklos to attack the Soviet defenses and break through them.

Dalnoki-Miklos had many things to consider. The Hungarian mechanized corps was down to six battalions. The Russian defenses had already repelled the attack of 40 German battalions. After assessing the situation, Dalnoki-Miklos decided to try something other than the ordered breakthrough. Instead, Dalnoki-Miklos, planned and performed a maneuver that led to the encirclement of the Russian defenses. As a result, a superior Soviet force was neutralized and the road to Voroshilovgrad was opened up for the continuation of the German advance.

The German General Staff (Oberkommando des Heeres) had high praise for the outstanding achievements and tactical victories of the Hungarian mechanized corps. The mechanized corps fought for five months in a long campaign and covered over 1,000 miles of territory.

Yet once again these victories were too costly. And the costs was not limited to the mechanized corps itself. The costs were also too high to the whole Hungarian nation. For a country the size of Hungary, the losses were tremendous. By the end of 1941, there were over 200 officers and more than 2,500 rank and file dead. Over 1,500 Hungarians were missing in action. At a minimum, another 7,500 were wounded. Losses in material were high as well. Gone were over 1,200 personnel carriers, 30 airplanes, 28 artillery pieces, 100 per cent of the L3 tankettes, 80 per cent of the Toldi tanks, and 90 per cent of the armored cars.

In November 1941, the "Rapid Corps" returned to Budapest.

=== The Hungarian Second Army takes over for the mechanized corps ===
The withdrawal of the Hungarian mechanized corps did not mean the end of Hungary's military participation in the war.

On 7 September 1941, at Hitler's invitation, Admiral Horthy visited German headquarters to negotiate what this participation would be. Horthy was accompanied by Minister-President László Bárdossy, General Szombathelyi, and Counselor to the Hungarian Embassy in Berlin, Andor Szentmiklosy. During negotiations, the Germans confronted the Hungarian visitors with a surprising statement. According to the Germans, the former Hungarian Chief of Staff, General Werth, had stated that Hungary would send more Hungarian troops to the front when the Hungarian mechanized corps was retired. In other words, Horthy would gain Hitler's consent to withdraw the "Rapid Corps" only in exchange for an even larger Hungarian force.

The departure of the mechanized corps left the Hungarians with only a bicycle battalion, four infantry brigades, and two cavalry brigades on the Eastern Front. This force was poorly equipped to cope with the vast distances and appalling conditions found there. While this force included a total of about 63,000 men, only the cavalry was able to make any useful contribution to the war effort.

Germany continued to demand a maximum effort from the Hungarians and soon the Hungarian Second Army was dispatched. By the end of 1942, this ill-fated army was on the front lines north of Stalingrad protecting the doomed German 6th Army's northern flank.

=== The I Armored Corps and the end ===
In Budapest, the Hungarian mechanized corps was re-fitted and made ready for battle. On 1 October 1942, the unit was renamed the "I Armored Corps".

On 29 December 1944, the Battle of Budapest began. The "I Armored Corps" participated in the defense of Hungary's capital city.

On 13 February 1945, after a long siege, Budapest fell to the Soviets. On the same day, what was left of the Hungarian "I Armored Corps" was disbanded.

== See also ==
- Military equipment of Axis Power forces in Balkans and Russian Front
- Hungary during the Second World War
- Military of Hungary – 1940/45
- Invasion of Yugoslavia – 1941
- Battle of Uman – 1941
- Battle of Budapest – 1944/45
- Eastern Front (World War II)
- Hungarian First Army
- Hungarian Second Army
- Hungarian Third Army

== Notes ==
Footnotes

Citations
