= Romanian Land Forces =

Army of Romania

- Forțele Terestre Române
- The coat of arms of the Land Forces General Staff
- Founded: 24 November [O.S. 12 November] 1859
- Country: Romania
- Type: Army
- Role: Infantry, Artillery, Armour, Mountain troops, Airborne, ISR, CBRN
- Size: 35,500-43,000
- Part of: Romanian Armed Forces
- Command HQ: Bucharest
- Anniversaries: 23 April

Commanders
- Chief of the Land Forces Staff: Major General Ciprian Marin
- Notable commanders: Marshal Constantin Prezan; Marshal Alexandru Averescu; Marshal Ion Antonescu

Insignia
- Roundel

- Military colors

- Identification flag (obverse)

The Romanian Land Forces (Romanian: Forțele Terestre Române) is the army of Romania, and the main component of the Romanian Armed Forces. Since 2007, full professionalization and a major equipment overhaul have transformed the nature of the Land Forces.

The Romanian Land Forces was founded on 24 November [O.S. 12 November] 1859. It participated in the Romanian War of Independence against the Ottoman Empire, the Second Balkan War against Bulgaria, World War I against the Central Powers (in which it won the decisive battles of Mărăști and Mărășești), and the Hungarian–Romanian War. During most of World War II (until 1944), Romanian forces supported the Axis powers, fighting against the Soviet Union on the Eastern Front. From August 1944 until the end of the war, Romania fought against Germany under the control of the Soviet Union. When the communists seized power after the Second World War, the army underwent reorganisation and sovietization.

Following the Romanian Revolution of 1989, due to shortage of funds, many units were disbanded and much equipment was phased out. Likewise, Romanian military capability declined because of a lack of fuel as well as training. However, since the late 1990s, a number of positive changes have come about and the level of combat readiness has been growing steadily; since 1996, the military budget has grown more than four times, rising from 636 million dollars to 2.8 billion dollars in 2007. Conscription has been abolished and professionalisation has been completed.

== History ==
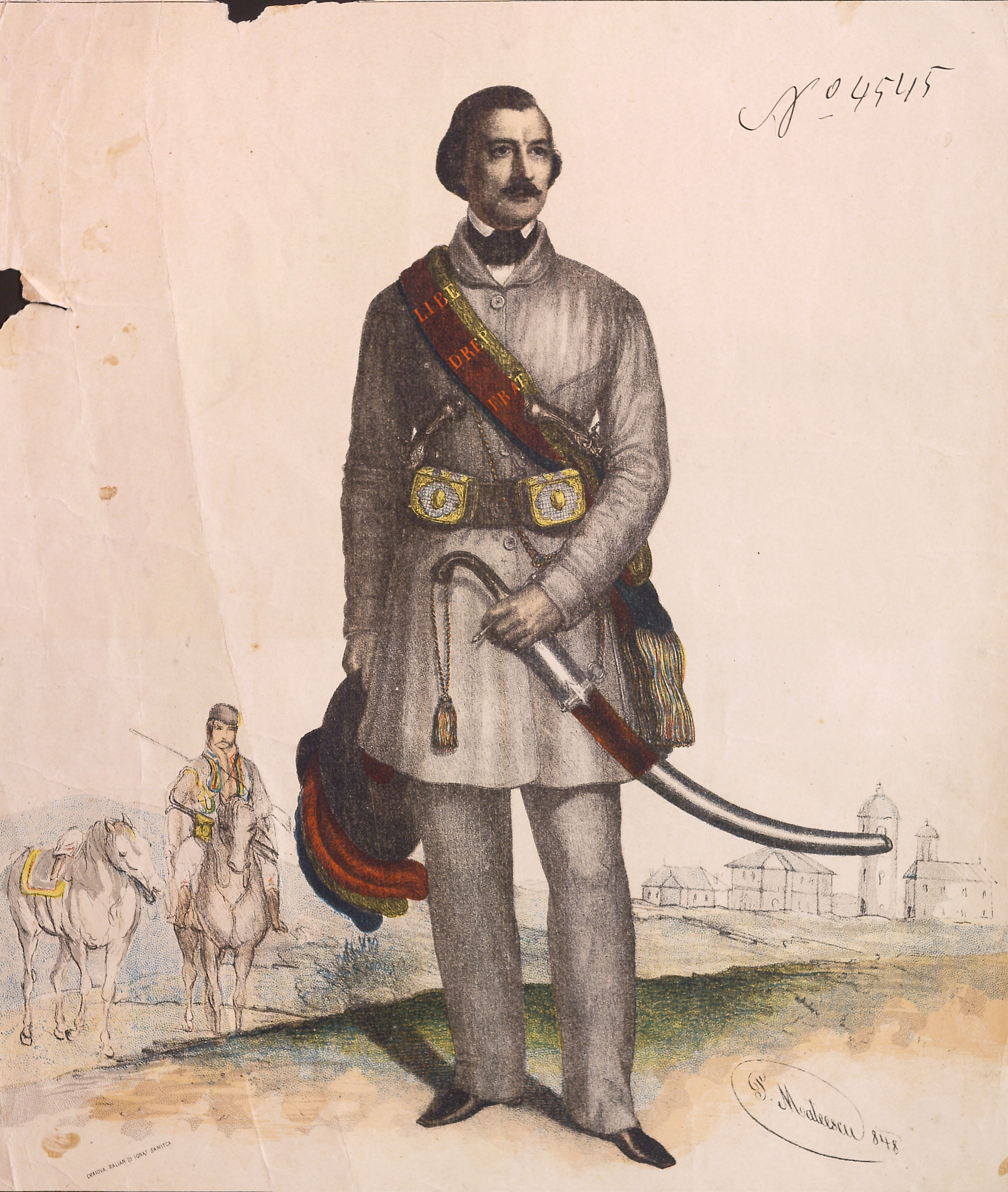
General Gheorghe Magheru

The modern Moldavian and Wallachian armies were formed in 1830 following Regulamentul Organic. During the 1848 Wallachian Revolution, Gheorghe Magheru assembled an army at Râureni (now part of Râmnicu Vâlcea). However, due to the lack of proper equipment and the hesitation of some revolution leaders, Magheru ordered his troops to disband when the Ottoman forces swept into Bucharest to stop the revolution. A battle between the Bucharest fire company together with Line infantry soldiers against the Ottomans also took place at Dealul Spirii in 1848.

=== Romanian War of Independence ===
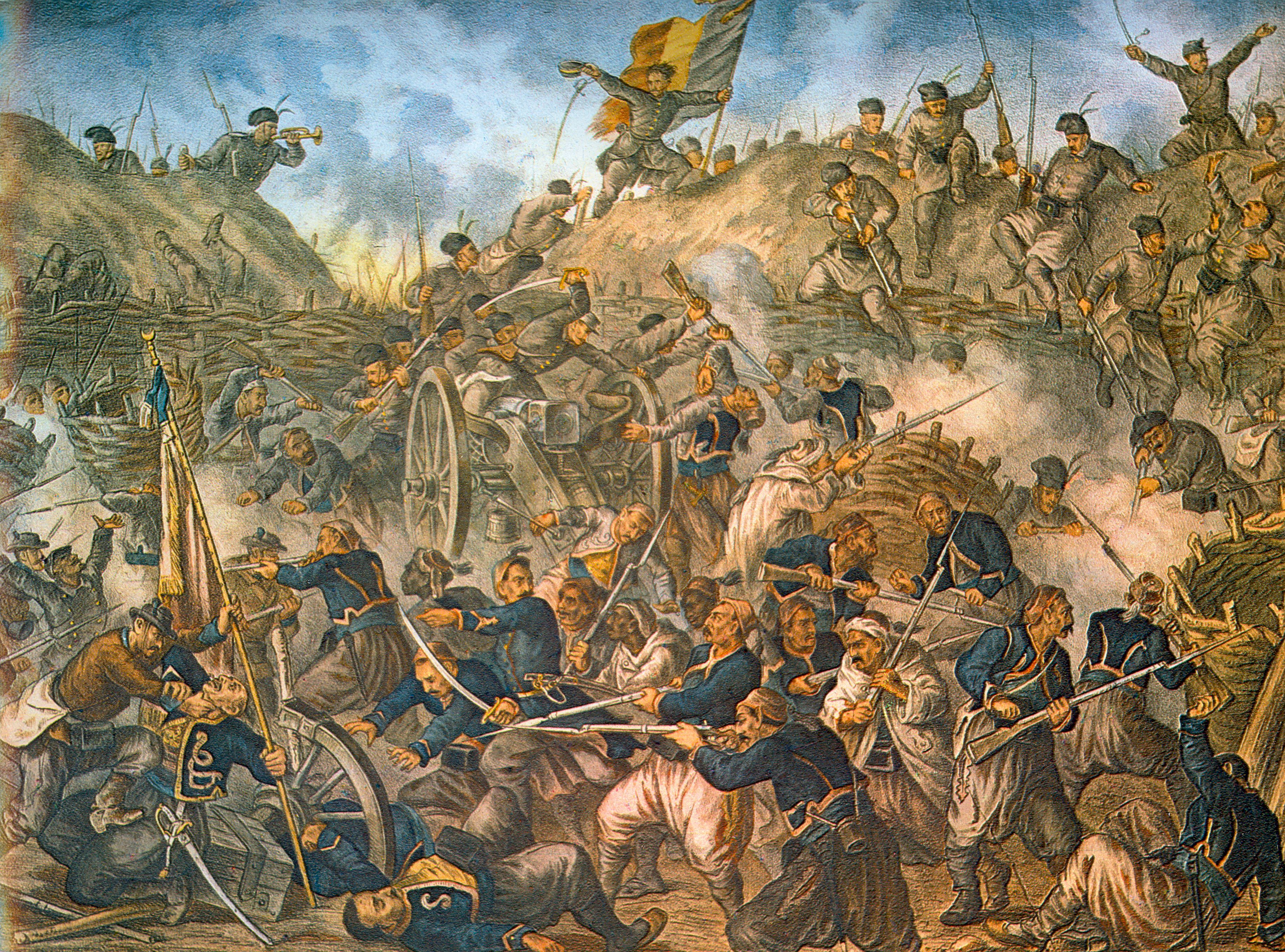
Romanian troops taking Grivitsa redoubt

The current Romanian Land Forces were formed in 1860, immediately after the unification of Wallachia with Moldavia, and were commanded by Alexandru Ioan Cuza, Domnitor of Romania until his abdication in 1866. In 1877, at the request of Grand Duke Nicholas Konstantinovich of Russia the Romanian army fused with the Russian forces, and led by King Carol I, fought in what was to become the Romanian War of Independence. They participated in the Siege of Plevna and several other battles. The Romanians won the war, but suffered about 10,000 casualties (dead and wounded).

=== Second Balkan War ===
The Romanian Army entered the Second Balkan War against Bulgaria, allowing Romania to annex Southern Dobruja (also known as the Cadrilater). Although some 330,000 troops were mobilised, the Romanians met little resistance in Bulgaria and as such this is not considered a major conflict in Romanian history. This was due to historical claims on land and the area no longer belongs to Romania. During the Second Balkan War, the Romanian Army suffered a cholera outbreak that provoked 1,600 deaths.

=== World War I ===
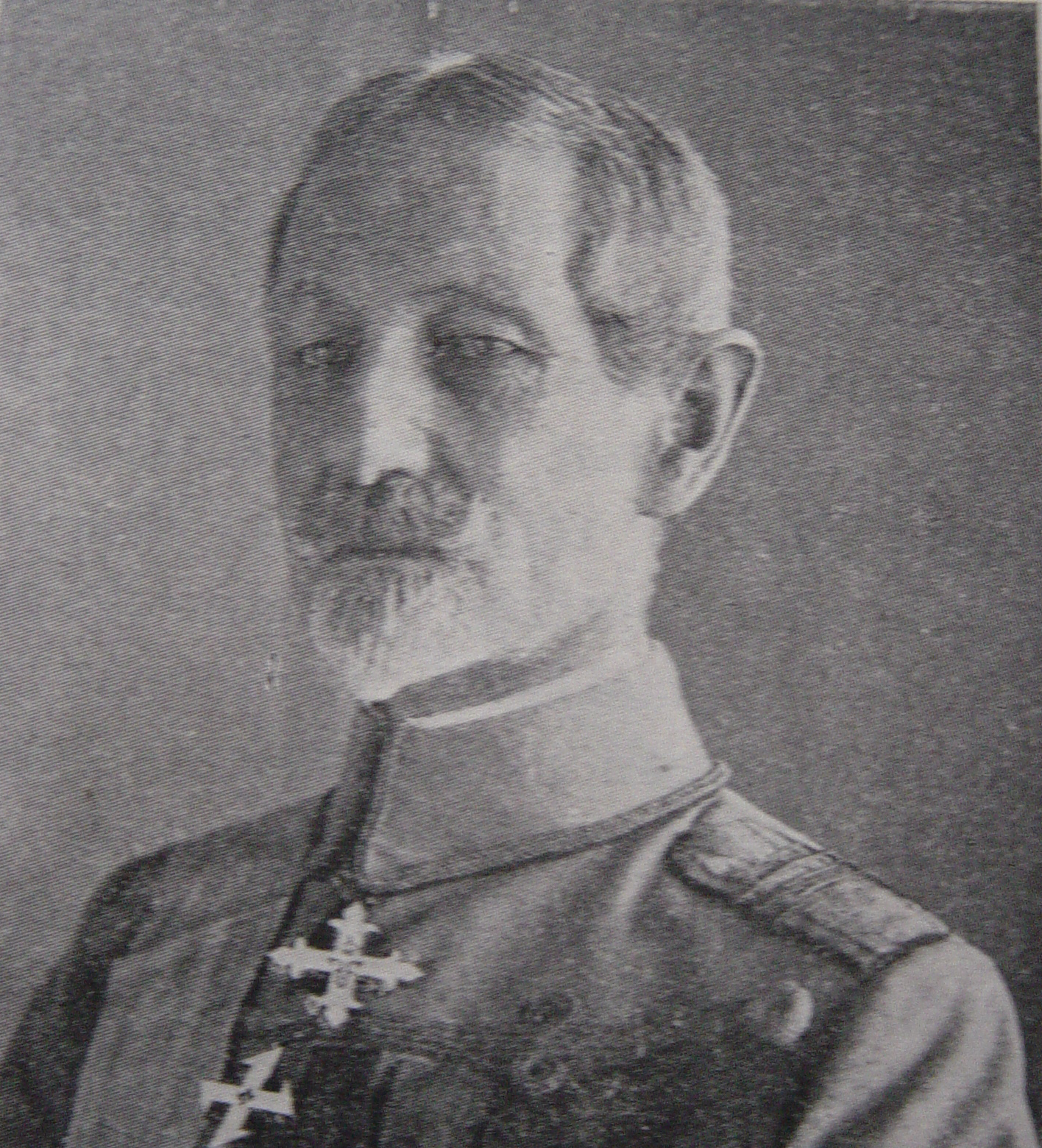
Marshal Alexandru Averescu

On 6 July 1916, the Kingdom of Romania declared war on the German Empire and Austria-Hungary, following the initial success of the Brusilov Offensive (a major Russian offensive against the armies of the Central Powers on the Eastern Front). The Romanian armies entered Transylvania (then part of the Austro-Hungarian Empire), together with Russian forces. However, German forces under the command of General Erich von Falkenhayn stalled the attack in November 1916, and drove back the Romanian forces. At the same time, Austro-Hungarian and Ottoman forces invaded southern Romania, forcing the country into a two-front war. The Central Powers drove deep into Romania and conquered the southern part of the country (Wallachia, including Bucharest) by the end of 1916. The Romanian forces, led by Marshal Constantin Prezan, retreated into the north-east part of Romania (Moldavia). In the summer of 1917 however, Prezan, aided by Ion Antonescu, successfully defended the remaining unoccupied territories against German and Austro-Hungarian forces led by Field Marshal August von Mackensen. General Alexandru Averescu led the Second Army in victory at the Battle of Mărăști (22 July to 1 August 1917), while Major Generals Constantin Cristescu and Eremia Grigorescu led the First Army in victory at the Battle of Mărășești (6 August to 8 September 1917).

As a result of the Russian Revolution, Romania was left isolated and unable to continue the war, and was forced to sign the Treaty of Bucharest with the Central Powers. Later on, in 1919, Germany agreed, in the Treaty of Versailles Article 259, to renounce all the benefits provided to it by the Treaty of Bucharest in 1918. After the success of the Vardar offensive on the Macedonian front, which put Bulgaria out of the war, Romania re-entered the war on 10 November 1918, a day before its end in the West.

=== Hungarian–Romanian War ===
After World War I, in December 1918, the Great National Assembly of Alba Iulia proclaimed a union with the Kingdom of Romania. Later on, in April 1919, the newly established Hungarian Soviet Republic vowed to retake occupied territories by force, and Hungarian troops attacked Romanian formations in Transylvania. Under the command of generals Gheorghe Mărdărescu and Traian Moșoiu, the Romanian Army defeated the Hungarians and occupied Budapest in August 1919.

=== World War II ===
==== With the Axis Powers ====
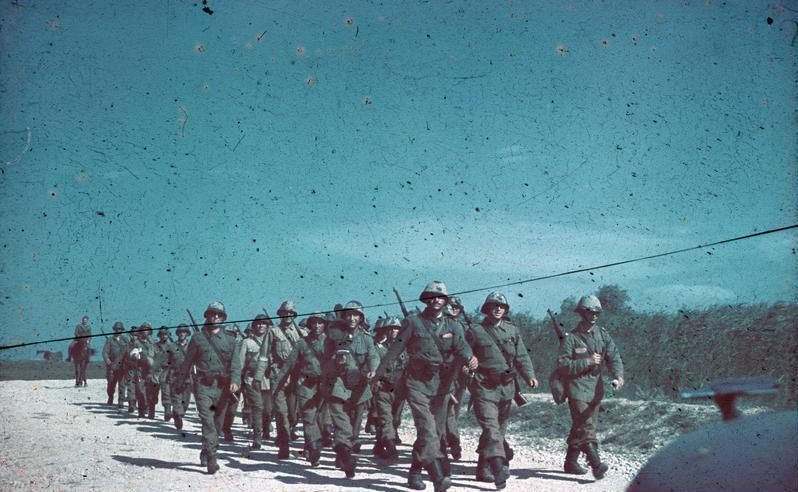
Royal Romanian Army infantry in 1943

In June 1940 the Soviet Union occupied Bessarabia and Northern Bukovina. After General (later Marshal) Ion Antonescu took power in September 1940, Fascist Romania signed the Tripartite Pact with the Axis powers and subsequently took part in Operation Barbarossa in 1941. An expeditionary force invaded the Soviet Union in Bessarabia and southern Ukraine, alongside the Wehrmacht. The expeditionary force, 'Army Group Antonescu,' was composed on 22 June 1941 of the 3rd Army, the 4th Army, the 2nd Army Corps, and the 11th Infantry Division. The 3rd Army comprised the 4th Army Corps (6th and 7th Infantry Divisions), the Cavalry Corps, the Mountain Corps, two separate artillery battalions, a TA unit, and the Air Force's 3rd Army Cooperation Command. The 4th Army consisted of the 3rd Army Corps, the 5th Army Corps, the 11th Army Corps (two fortress brigades), and the 4th Army Cooperation Command. The army group-level 2nd Army Corps, under Major General Nicolae Macici, controlled the 9th and 10th Infantry Divisions and the 7th Cavalry Brigade. Additionally the 1st Armoured Division was formed for service on the Eastern Front. The Army Group's first offensive, in conjunction with the Eleventh Army, Operation München, enabled Romania to retake the territory immediately east of the Dnister, former part of Moldavia. The Romanian armies saw their first major battles at Odessa and Sevastopol, and in 1942 advanced with other Axis forces deeper into Soviet territory during operation Case Blue. In early November, Romanian mountain troops under the command of Brigadier General Ioan Dumitrache took Nalchik, the farthest point of Axis advance into the Caucasus.

The worst defeat for the Romanian expeditionary force on the Eastern Front occurred at Stalingrad, where, during the Soviet counter-offensive of November 1942, the thinly spread forces of the Third Army (under the command of General Petre Dumitrescu, deployed north of Stalingrad) and of the Fourth Army (under the command of Lieutenant General Constantin Constantinescu-Claps, deployed south of Stalingrad) were attacked by vastly superior Soviet forces and suffered combined losses of some 158,000 personnel.

During April–May 1944 the Romanian forces led by General Mihai Racoviță, together with elements of the German Eighth Army were responsible for defending Northern Romania during the Soviet First Jassy-Kishinev Offensive, and took part in the Battles of Târgu Frumos. In late August 1944, the Red Army entered eastern Romania.

==== With the Allied powers ====
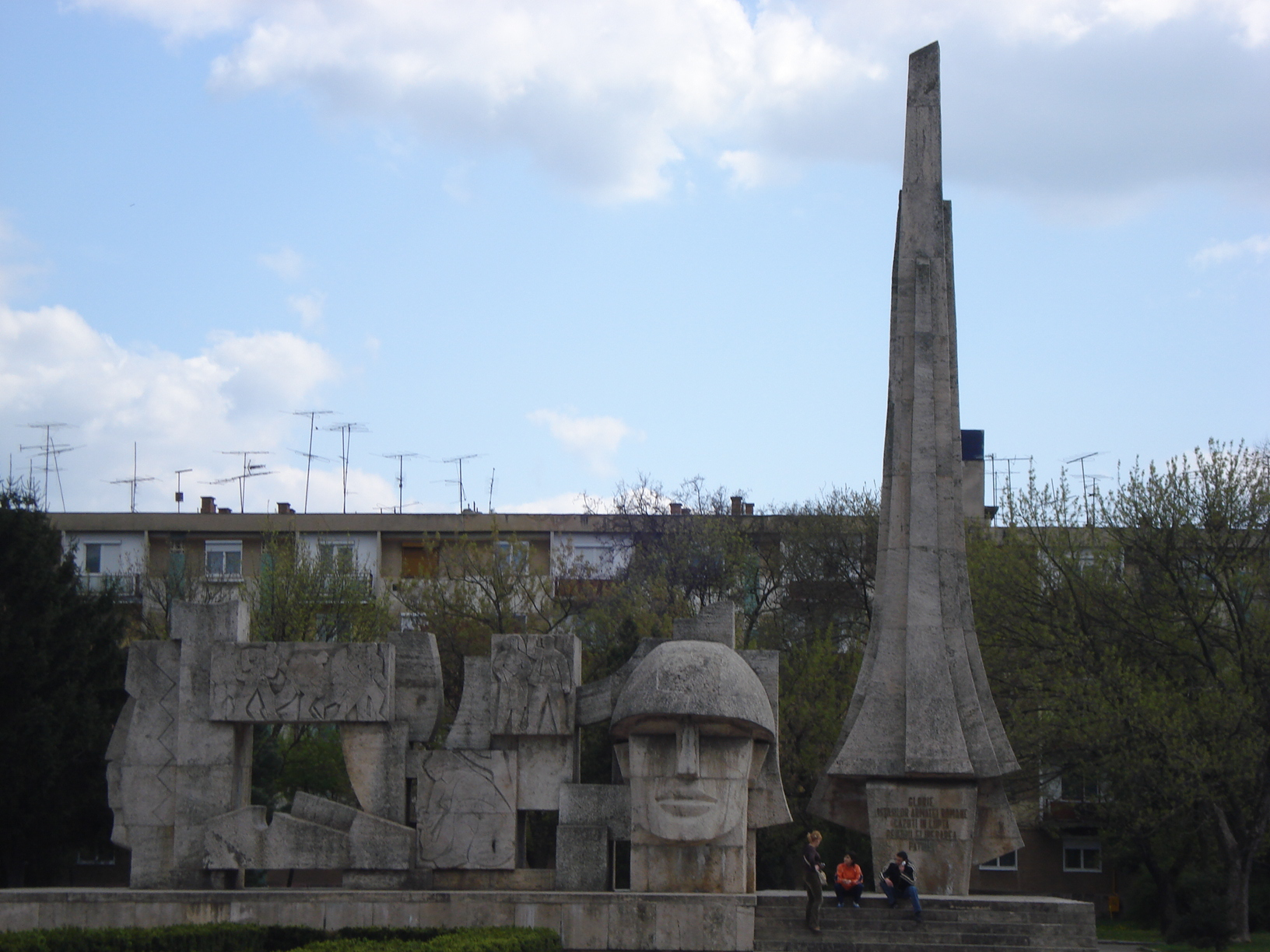
Monument of the Romanian Soldier in Carei

On 23 August 1944, a coup led by King Michael I of Romania deposed Marshal Antonescu and set up a pro-Soviet government. It has been estimated that the royal coup shortened the war by six months. Romania soon declared war on Nazi Germany and its allies, and the First Army (under the command of General Macici and later Vasile Atanasiu) and the Fourth Army (under the command of Lieutenant General Gheorghe Avramescu and later Nicolae Dăscălescu) were pressed into action. After expelling the last of the Wehrmacht and Hungarian Army units from Romania at the battles of Turda and Carei, the Romanian armies took part in the Siege of Budapest and the Prague Offensive of May 1945.

=== Cold War ===
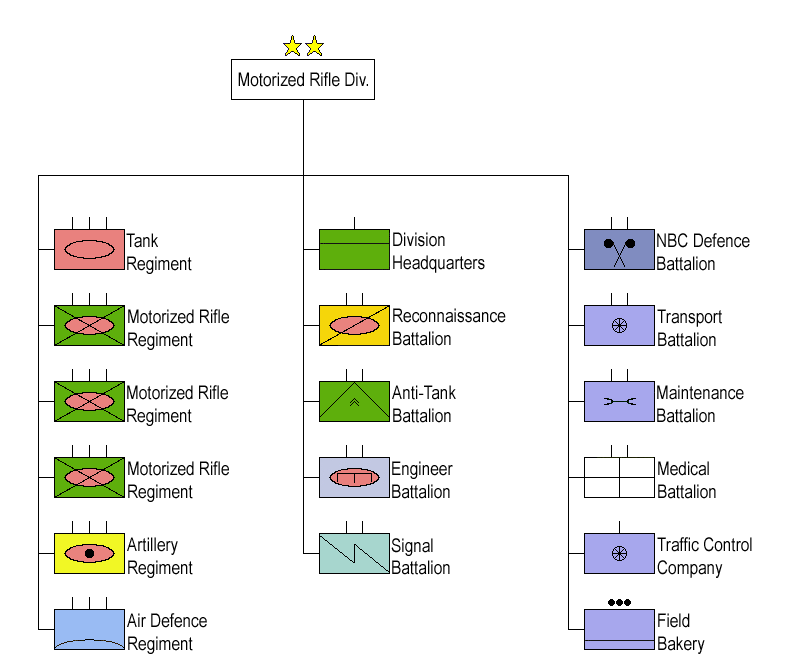
Structural graphic of a Romanian Motor Rifle Division during the Cold War

The Soviet occupation of Romania led to a complete reorganisation of the Romanian Land Forces under the supervision of the Red Army. At the onset, pro-German elements were purged from the Romanian armed forces. In 1944–45, two divisions were formed out of Romanian volunteers—ex-prisoners of war, trained and indoctrinated in the Soviet Union during the war, but also of many Communist activists. One was the Tudor Vladimirescu First Volunteer Division, under the command of Colonel Nicolae Cambrea, and the other the Horea, Cloșca și Crișan Division, under the command of General Mihail Lascăr (who later served as Minister of Defence from 1946 to 1947). These two units formed the nucleus of the new Romanian Land Forces under Soviet control. The postwar reorganization of the Land Forces included cavalry, but the arm disappeared from the force with the disbandment in November 1954 of the 59th Cavalry Division at Oradea.

After the Romanian Communist Party seized political power, the sovietization of the army commenced, under the supervision of the new Minister of Defence, Emil Bodnăraș. Thirty per cent of the officers and noncommissioned officers (mostly experienced soldiers, and a potential source of opposition) were purged from the military. This involved copying the Soviet model of military and political organisation, and changing the military doctrine of combat and defence, also in the context of Romania's integration in the strategic system of the Soviets, at the beginning of the Cold War.

In the early 1950s the RLF reached a level of 12 rifle, one mechanised, and one tank division. From 1959 the rifle and mechanised divisions were converted to mechanized (motorized rifle) divisions, and reductions in strength began. Rottman writes that "force size dropped to six mechanized and two armored divisions by 1970 [actually 1968]. From 1970 to 1976, three more motor rifle divisions were formed, but one was deactivated in 1977, and the eight motor rifle and two armored division figure remained that way for the rest of the Cold War."

From 1947 to 1960 the country seems to have been divided into three major military regions: Cluj, Bacău, and Bucharest in the west, east, and south, respectively. In wartime the land forces in each military region would become an army corps with their headquarters in Cluj-Napoca, Iași, and Bucharest. Armies seem to have succeeded military regions in 1960, and three armies seem to have become four in 1980. What is known is that on 1 July 1947 Fourth Army became 3rd Military Region, based in Cluj. The 3rd Military Region became the 3rd Army on 30 April 1960, and the 4th Army on 5 April 1980.

During the 1980s, the land forces numbered 140,000 personnel, of whom two-thirds were conscripts. In 1989 the land forces were organized in four armies: the First Army at Bucharest, the Second Army at Buzău, the Third Army at Craiova, and the Fourth Army at Cluj-Napoca.

The land forces consisted of eight mechanised (infantry) divisions (1st, Bucharest, 2nd, Craiova, 9th, Constanța, 10th, Iași, 11th, Oradea, 18th, Timișoara, 67th, Brăila and 81st, Dej) two armored divisions (the 57th Tank Division at Bucharest and the 6th Tank Division at Târgu Mureș), one armored brigade, four mountain (infantry) brigades, and four parachute infantry regiments.

According to the 165-year 'History of Modern Romanian Artillery,' in 1989 each of the four armies were organized into a headquarters and reporting formations under them, which were organized as follows:

- 1st Army Command
  - 1st Mechanized Division, 57th Tank Division and the 2nd Mountain Brigade
- 2nd Army Command
  - 9th Mechanized Division, 10th Mechanized Division, 67th Mechanized Division and 32nd Tactical Missile Brigade
- 3rd Army Command
  - 2nd Mechanized Division, 18th Mechanized Division, the 7th Tank Brigade and the 4th Mountain Brigade
- 4th Army Command
  - 11th Mechanized Division, 81st Mechanized Division, 6th Tank Division, the 1st and 5th Mountain Brigades and the 37th Tactical Missile Brigade

The mechanized divisions were organized along the Soviet model with a division HQ, three mechanized infantry regiments, one tank regiment, combat and service support units, and a full complement of 10,700 infantry soldiers, having 130 main battle tanks, 216 wheeled armoured personnel carriers (APCs), 30 wheeled armoured reconnaissance vehicles, 18 light SPGs SU-76, 54 towed 120mm. M-38/-43 (or Md.1982 120mm. Romanian made) mortars, 36 towed 122 mm howitzer M1938 (M-30) and 12 truck-mounted (Romanian production) 122mm. multiple rocket launchers APR-40 (which will become later, after an extensive modernization, the LAROM MRL system). Compared to similar Soviet, Hungarian, or Bulgarian divisions, the Romanian ones were more poorly equipped, both in terms of number and quality of heavy weapons. The armored divisions were composed of 3 tank regiments and one mechanized infantry regiment plus support units. The artillery, antitank, and air defence regiments of divisions provided specialised fire support that enabled motorised rifle and tank regiments to maneuver. Each of the four Army Commands comprised an antiaircraft artillery brigade and an air defense missile artillery regiment (Surface-to-Air). Three of the four air defense missile regiments were equipped with 2K12 Kub systems, and the fourth regiment with 9K33 Osa SAMs in the late 1980s the artillery regiments of mechanized and tank divisions were organized into a regimental HQ, two artillery battalions and one multiple rocket launcher battalion.

In terms of their combat equipment, the RLF operated a total of 2,825 tanks: 1,059 outdated (soviet WW-2 type) T-34-85 tanks, 785 Soviet and Czechoslovak T-55/-55A/-55AM tanks, 415 Romanian built TR-77-580, 535 Romanian built TR-85-800, and 31 Soviet T-72 "Ural-1" tanks. The 9th and the 11th Mechanized Divisions operated Romanian built TR-77-580 tanks, the 2nd Mechanized Division and the 57th Tank Division operated Romanian built TR-85-800 tanks, the 10th and 81st Mechanized Divisions and the 6th Tank Division operated soviet and Czechoslovak built T-55/-55A/-55AM tanks, while the remaining three mechanized divisions (1st, 18th and 67th) were equipped with mixed equipment, including a number of outdated soviet T-34-85 tanks, within their mechanized regiments. The 1st Mechanized Tudor Vladimirescu Division apparently operated four types of tanks, from the modern Soviet T-72 "Ural-1", to a number of Romanian TR-77-580 and Soviet T-55A tanks, and to the outdated T-34-85 tanks.

The predominantly defensive structure of the Romanian Land Forces was also highlighted by the five anti-tank (missile-artillery) regiments (each with 36 Romanian made 100 mm anti-tank gun M1977 and 12 ATGM launcher vehicle based on BRDM-2 4x4 scout armoured car a.k.a. 9P133 "Malyutka" (with 9M14 Malyutka anti-tank guided missiles) and 9P148 "Konkurs" (with 9M113 Konkurs anti-tank guided missiles), placed especially in the areas most exposed to a possible armored attack, and subordinated to the four army commands. Besides these, there were also nine anti-tank artillery battalions, mostly subordinated to the mechanized divisions, some equipped with Romanian made 100 mm anti-tank gun M1977, but the majority with older Soviet production 85 mm antitank gun D-48.

Surface-to-surface missile battalions were divided into four batteries, each equipped with one missile launcher. The RLF operated 32 9K52 Luna-M short-range artillery rocket systems and 18 R-17 Elbrus tactical ballistic missile systems. Each mechanized division had a "Luna-M" missile battalion, while two of the four army commands had also an "Elbrus" missile brigade. Proven to be fairly inaccurate in combat, "Luna-M" (a.k.a. FROG-7) and "Elbrus" (a.k.a. SCUD-B) missiles would be rather less effective weapons carrying conventional high-explosive warheads. Tipped with nuclear or chemical warheads, however, they could be devastating. According to one former Romanian official writing in 1988, Romania produced chemical agents that could be delivered by battlefield missiles. The vânători de munte specialised troops, reactivated in 1961, were formed up into an independent branch of the RLF with 4 separate mountain brigades in 1989. The vânători de munte were seen as the best-trained forces of the Army in the communist Romania. Each brigade had a mechanized company equipped with MLVM APCs and a mountain artillery battalion of 76mm. mountain guns Md.1982 (similar to Yugoslav 76 mm mountain gun M48), but most of the equipment was for a motorized light infantry unit.

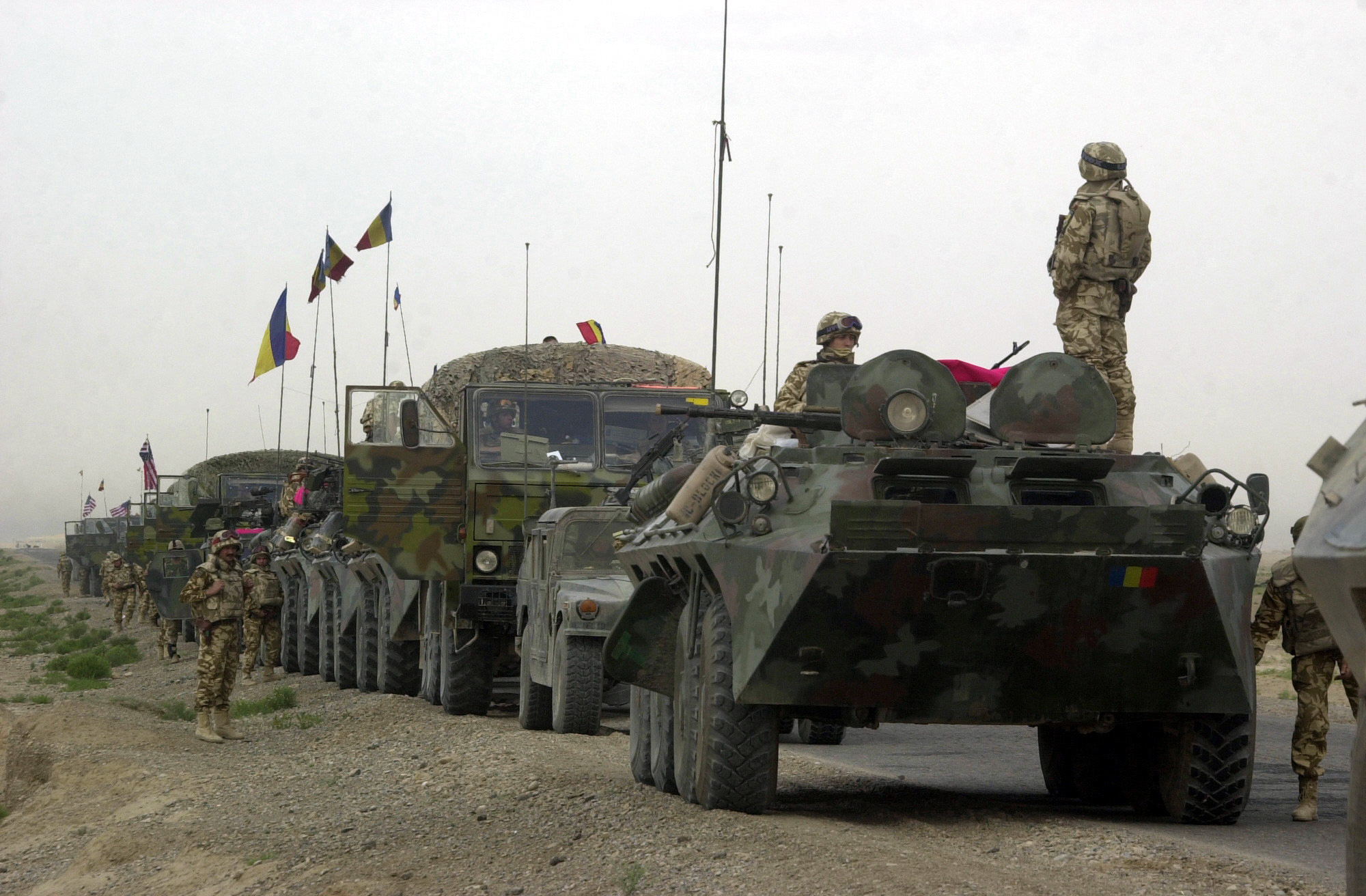
A Romanian Land Forces TAB-77 leads an ISAF convoy from Kandahar to Kabul, Afghanistan, in December 2008.

=== Post-communist era ===
During the early 1990s, some major units were disbanded and much equipment was phased out or scrapped due to a severe shortage of funds. The whole land forces structure was reorganized from armies into territorial corps, and from regiments into battalions. In the mid-1990s, the situation of the land forces was critical: the military budget was one third that of 1989 (636 million dollars), 50% of the equipment was older than 30 years, and 60% of the armoured vehicles and 85% of the missile units were non-operational. Due to lack of fuel and training, the level of combat readiness and military capability was extremely low (only about 30% of the entire land forces were operational). However, after 1996 the government took serious action; the military budget was increased greatly, and modernisation of equipment commenced. Officially, the program to modernize and restructure the armed forces began on 11 April 2000.

== Organisation ==
Romanian Land Forces organization as of October 2026 (click image to enlarge)

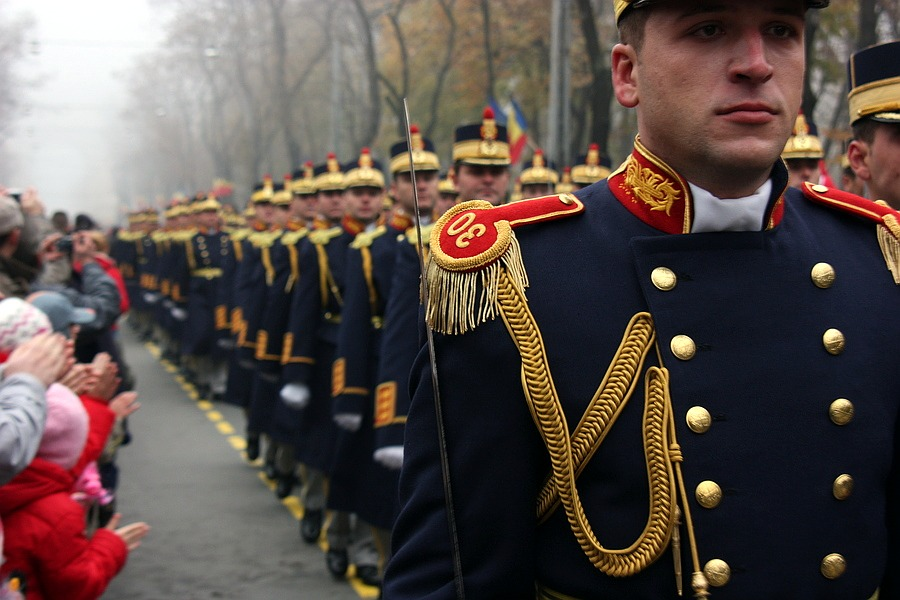
Soldiers from Michael the Brave 30th Guards Brigade on the Romanian National Day parade on 1 December, at the Triumphal arch in Bucharest

=== Manpower ===
In 2005, the army comprised eight combat, four combat support, and two logistic brigades, while ten combat, five combat support and two logistic brigades were further mobilised in case of crisis. Many of these units have been reorganized as part of the 2007 Force Plan.

Currently, about 75,000 military personnel and 15,000 civilians comprise the armed forces, for a total of 90,000 men and women. Out of the 75,000 military personnel, about 43,000 are in the Land Forces.

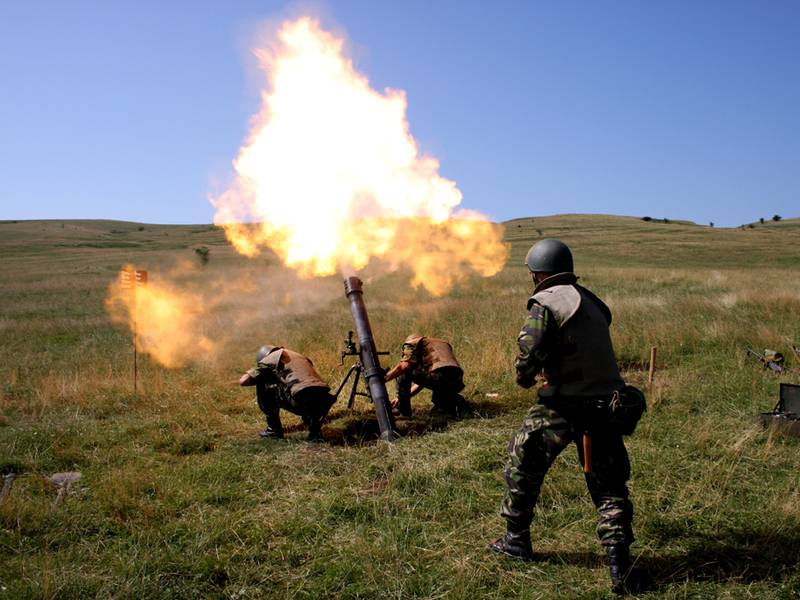
Soldiers firing a 120 mm mortar (locally made, Model 1982) during the Getica 2008 military exercise

=== Modernisation ===
The Romanian Land Forces are undergoing a three-stage modernisation. In 2007, the first short-term stage was completed (reorganisation of the command structure and implementation of the voluntary military service). 2015 marked the end of the second stage (operational integration in both NATO and the European Union). 2025 is the set date for when the long-term stage is to be completed (full technical integration in NATO and the EU). The stages aim at modernising the structure of the armed forces, reducing the number of personnel, as well as acquiring newer and improved technology that is compatible with NATO standards.

Romania abolished compulsory military service on 23 October 2006. This came about due to a 2003 constitutional amendment which allowed the parliament to make military service optional. The Parliament of Romania voted to abolish conscription in October 2005, with the vote formalising one of many military modernisation and reform programmes that Romania agreed to when it joined NATO in March 2004.

=== Structure ===
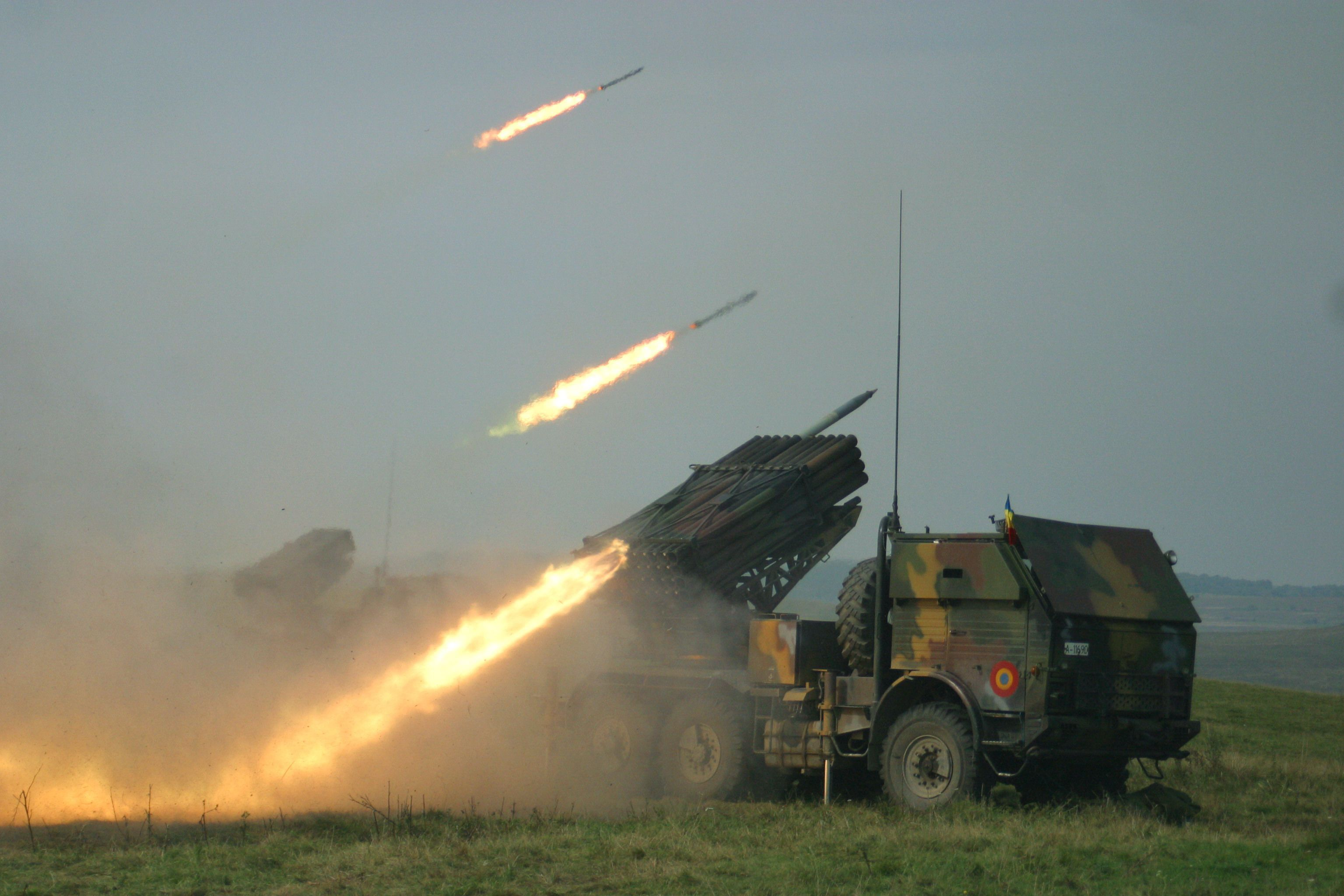
LAROM multiple rocket launchers during a firing exercise

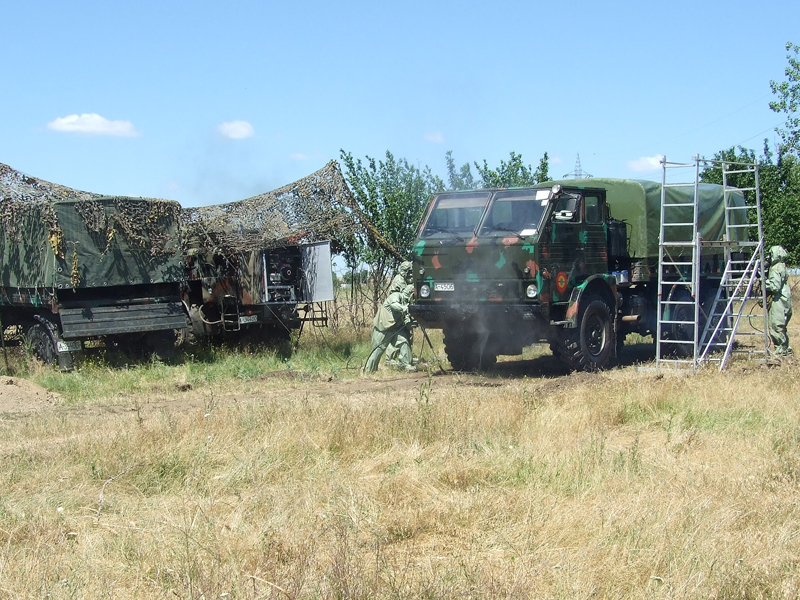
Members of the 202nd Chemical, Biological, Radiological and Nuclear Battalion during a military exercise

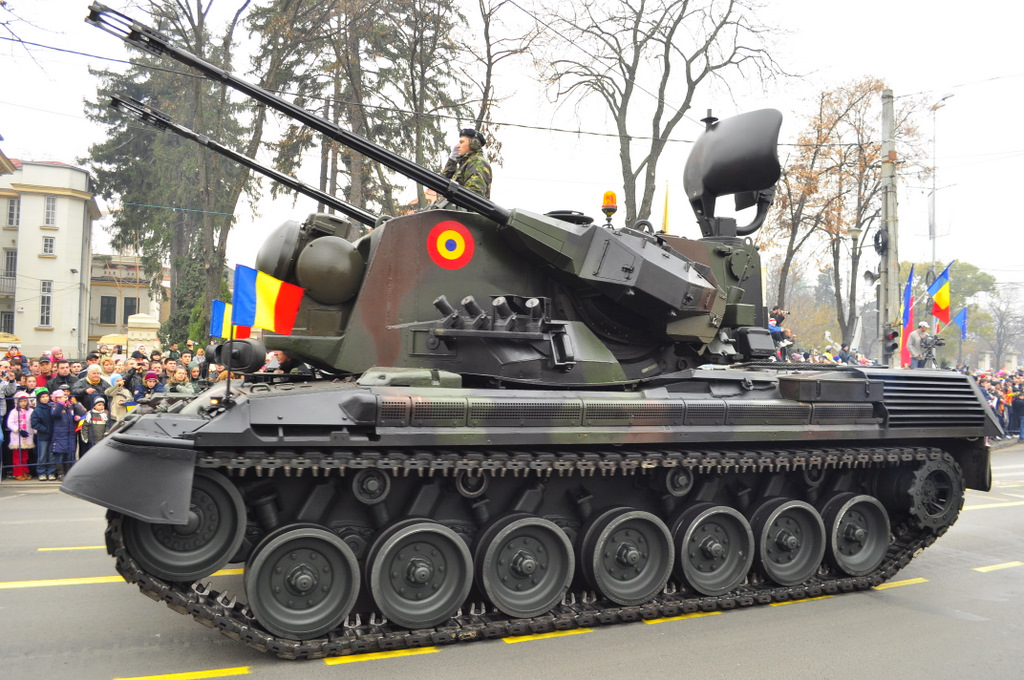
A Gepard SPAAG on the Romanian National Day parade on 1 December 2009, at the Triumph Arch in Bucharest

In peacetime, the supreme commander of the Land Forces is the Minister of Defence, while in wartime, the president assumes the role of supreme commander. The main combat formations of Romania are the 2nd Infantry Division Getica, and the 4th Infantry Division Gemina. Until 2015, the Romanian Land Forces fielded a third division, namely the 1st Division Dacia. Before June 2008, the 1st and 4th divisions were known as the 1st Territorial Army Corps and the 4th Territorial Army Corps, and in turn they used to be known as the 1st Army and 4th Army prior to 2000. However, due to their personnel having been reduced considerably to reach compatibility with NATO standards, they were renamed and reorganized as divisions. In 2010, the Joint HQ command was renamed as the 2nd Infantry Division Getica and received units from the 1st and 4th Infantry divisions.

The official day of the Land Forces is celebrated each year, on 23 April.

== Equipment ==
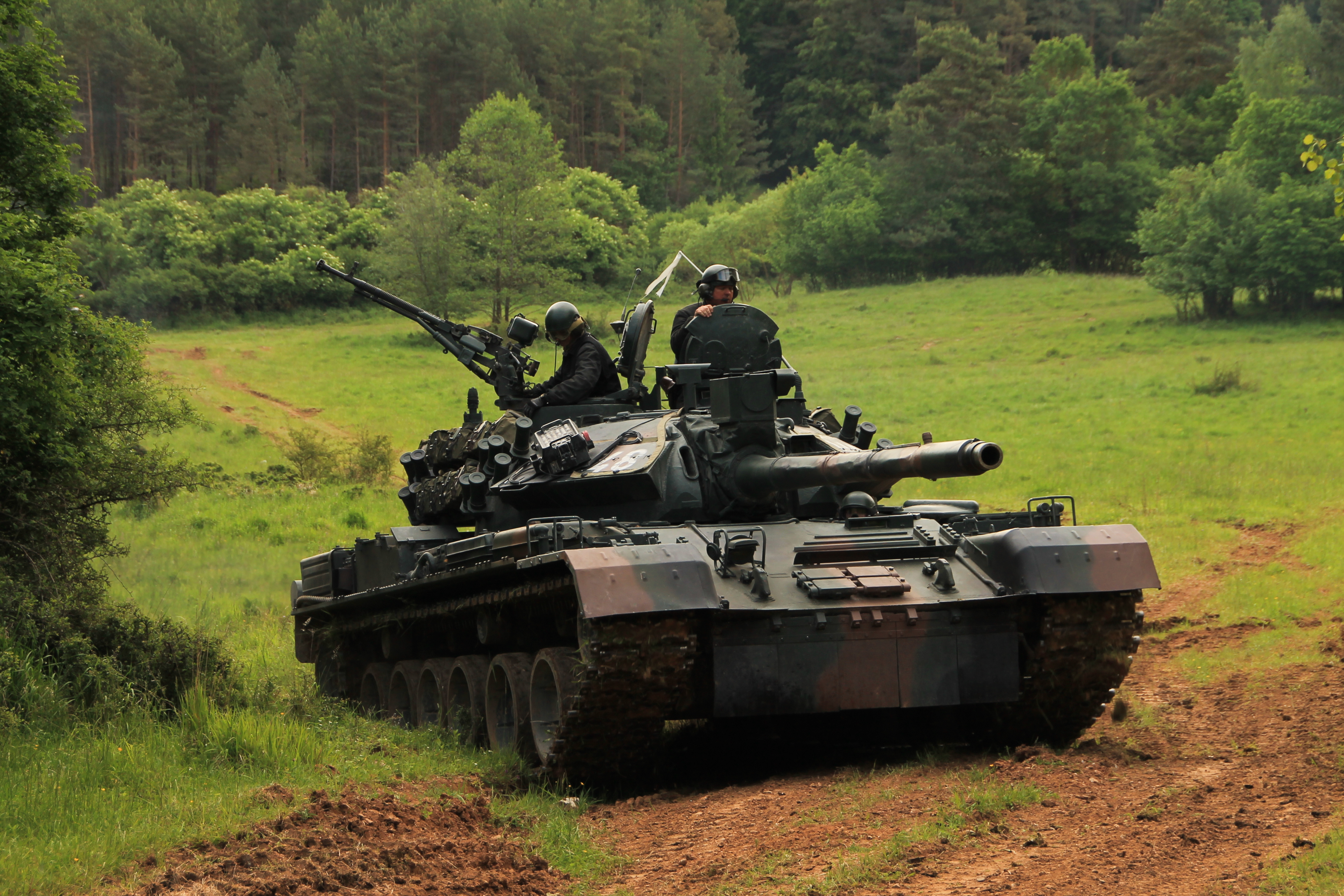
A TR-85M1 tank during a military exercise

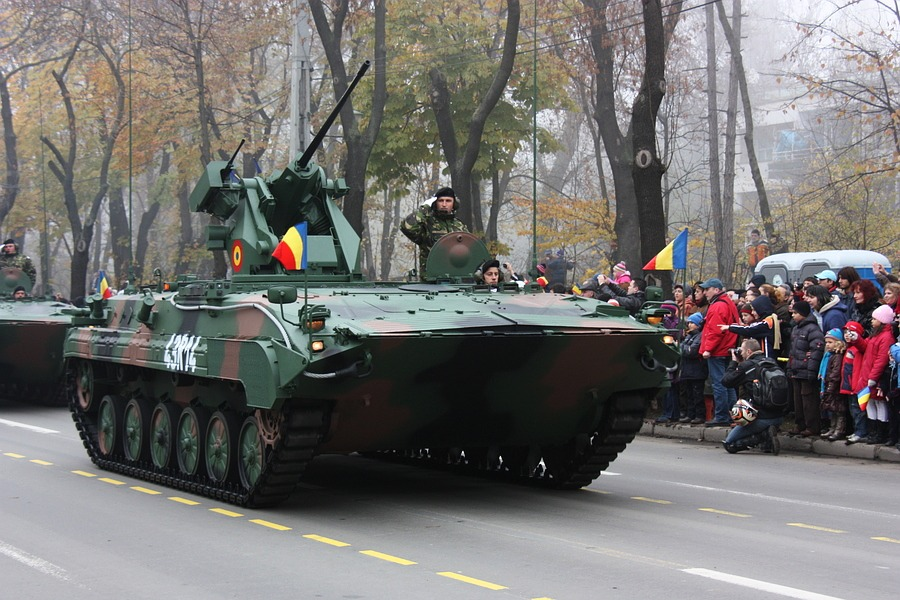
A MLI-84M infantry fighting vehicle on parade in Bucharest

The Romanian Land Forces have completely overhauled their equipment in the past few years, replacing them with more modern equipment. The TR-85M1 "Bizon" main battle tank and the MLI-84M "Jder" infantry fighting vehicle are the most modern, domestically produced equipment of the Romanian Land Forces. Also, 43 ex-German Flakpanzer Gepard anti-aircraft systems were commissioned in late 2004.

The Land Forces ordered about 100 United States Army Humvees; the first eight were delivered to the Military Police in December 2006. 31 Piranha III armoured vehicles (LAV III variant) and 60 URO VAMTAC high mobility vehicles were also ordered in 2007 for deployment in Iraq and Afghanistan. The land forces are also purchasing additional Piranha III armored vehicles. The Land Forces ordered 227 Piranha V armoured vehicles. The first batch of 36 vehicles, produced at GDELS-Mowag's facilities in Kreuzlingen, Switzerland, entered service with the 26th Infantry Battalion "Neagoe Basarab", also known as the Red Scorpions, in Craiova in October 2020. Another 133 units will be produced in Romania, at Bucharest Mechanical Factory.

Equipment Summary (2023):

Equipment	Numbers
Main battle tanks	377
Armoured infantry fighting vehicles	241
Armoured personnel carriers	749
Artillery guns, howitzers and mortars	1,136
Multiple rocket launchers	158

== Special Forces ==
The evolution of the special forces within the Romanian Land Forces led to the establishment of the 1st Special Operations Regiment on 1 August 2009, headquartered at Târgu Mureș. It later became the 6th Special Operations Brigade on 25 October 2011.

The most famous and well trained unit is the 1st Special Operations Battalion "Vulturii" was created in March 2003. Members of the special forces battalion have benefitted from courses abroad, such as the United States Army Special Forces (Green Berets) course, the United States Marine Corps Force Recon course, as well as other courses. The Special Forces battalion became fully operational during 2007, after a company had already been commissioned in early 2006. In 2018, the 6th Special Operations Brigade was transformed into the Special Operations Forces Command being directly subordinated to the General staff of Defence.

The current Romanian reconnaissance battalions (the 313th, the 317th and the 528th) are also considered special forces units, and were formed in the 1960s during the communist regime. After the revolution, the units suffered from a lack of funds which resulted in the temporary disbandment of the 313th Battalion. However, their equipment was completely overhauled in the past few years and the combat readiness and capabilities have regained full strength.

The Special Detachment of Protection and Intervention (DSPI), former Rapid Intervention Squad (DIR) of the Ministry of Defence is an elite special operations unit currently belonging to the General Directorate for Defense Intelligence. It is a military special unit, formed of highly skilled individuals, a very large percentage of its members being champions in martial arts, athletic disciplines and so on. DIR was, until December 2003, top secret.

== Training ==
After the Romanian Revolution, many firing ranges and training areas were closed and abandoned due to lack of funds. Currently, the military schools and training units of the Romanian Land Forces are directly subordinated to the central headquarters. There are 5 military high schools (Câmpulung Moldovenesc, Alba Iulia, Craiova, Breaza, and Constanța), five military academies, one officer school (Pitești), 3 training schools (Sibiu, Pitești, Buzău) and 9 training battalions.

In the past few years, many training exercises have taken place in Romania with other Balkan or Allied countries. Most of these exercises took place at Babadag, which is one of the largest and most modern training firing ranges and military facilities in Europe, with a total surface area of 270 square kilometres. It was announced on 6 December 2006 that 1,500 U.S. troops stationed at Mihail Kogălniceanu, which in time will form Joint Task Force East, will be using Babadag as a training base.

== Ranks ==
The Romanian Land Forces distinguishes four career paths: officers (Ofițeri), warrant officers (Maiștrii militari), NCO's (Subofițeri) and enlisted men (Soldați și gradați voluntari). The Marshal (Mareșal) rank can be given only in wartime by the President of Romania; in fact, Romania had only three marshals coming from the officers` rank in its history: Ion Antonescu, Alexandru Averescu and Constantin Prezan. Kings Ferdinand I, Carol II and Mihai I also held the rank of Marshal of Romania.

=== Commissioned officer ranks ===
The rank insignia of commissioned officers.

NATO code	OF-10	OF-9	OF-8	OF-7	OF-6	OF-5	OF-4	OF-3	OF-2	OF-1
Romanian Land Forces
Romanian Land Forces	Mareșal	General	General-locotenent	General-maior	General de brigadă	Colonel	Locotenent-colonel	Maior	Căpitan	Locotenent	Sublocotenent

=== Other ranks ===
The rank insignia of non-commissioned officers and enlisted personnel.

NATO code	OR-9		OR-8	OR-7	OR-6	OR-5	OR-4			OR-3	OR-2	OR-1
Romanian Land Forces
Romanian Land Forces	Plutonier adjutant principal	Plutonier adjutant	Plutonier-major	Plutonier	Sergent-major	Sergent	Caporal clasa I	Caporal clasa a II-a	Caporal clasa a III-a	Fruntaș	Soldat
