= Battle of Turda =

1944 battle in Romania during WWII

Battle of Turda (Battle of Torda)
- Part of Battle of Romania, World War II
Date	5 September – 8 October 1944
Location	Turda, Cluj-Turda County, Kingdom of Romania
Result	See aftermath

Belligerents
Romania; Soviet Union	Hungary; Germany

Commanders and leaders
(Kingdom of Romania) Gheorghe Avramescu (Soviet Union) Rodion Malinovsky	(Kingdom of Hungary (1920–1946)) Lajos Veress (Nazi Germany) Mortimer von Kessel

Strength
(Kingdom of Romania) 4th Army (Soviet Union) 27th Army	(Kingdom of Hungary (1920–1946)) 2nd Army (Nazi Germany) 8th Army

Casualties and losses
Romania: Unknown; Soviet Union: Unknown; 80+ tanks destroyed	Hungary: 10,000 killed, wounded or missing Germany: Unknown

The Battle of Turda lasted from 5 September to 8 October 1944, in the area around Turda, Kingdom of Romania, as part of the wider Battle of Romania. Troops from the Hungarian 2nd Army and the German 8th Army fought a defensive action against Romanian and Soviet forces. The battle was one of the largest fought in Transylvania during World War II.

== Prelude ==
Military operations in Romania, 23–31 August 1944: red = Soviet Red Army; yellow = Romanian troops; blue = Axis forces, frontlines

Prior to the battle, Soviet units of the 2nd Ukrainian Front occupied the Vulcan Pass, as well as the cities of Brașov and Sibiu. The Red Army intended to capture Cluj—the historical capital of Transylvania—without much effort. While continuing to advance toward the Mureș River, which the Hungarian 2nd Armored Division had been able to cross, they collided with and stopped the Hungarian units; the 2nd Hungarian Army was forced to take a defensive stance on 10 September 1944.

== The battle ==
The Soviet Stavka (high command), was surprised by the unexpected Hungarian offensive, and decided to strengthen its forces in the area to prevent another one. It also launched an attack of their own on Turda, in tandem with the Romanian 4th Army. The town was originally defended by the weakened Hungarian 25th Infantry Division, which had only about three battalions immediately available. The other three were delayed by various rear guard actions, and were not expected before 13 September. The advancing Red Army armored units were stopped by the 3rd Battalion of the Hungarian 25th Infantry Division (headquartered at Oradea)—at the road intersection at Vințu de Sus—on 13 September. The first three Soviet tanks were knocked out by the Hungarian anti-tank gun section of the III./25 ID. The rest of the armored column then spread out and attacked the defenders. With the help of a German AT unit, the Hungarians knocked out a further 17 tanks. The attack was thus stopped, and the Soviets regrouped and retreated to defensive positions.

The Soviets and their Romanian ally attacked again on 14 September west of Turda. The 2nd Mountain Replacement Brigade arrived in this area and was able to stem the onslaught. The Soviets switched their efforts to the eastern sector in the afternoon, and there they were able to break through and reach the outskirts of Turda. The town was held by the Axis thanks to a timely counterattack by the 25th Infantry Division.

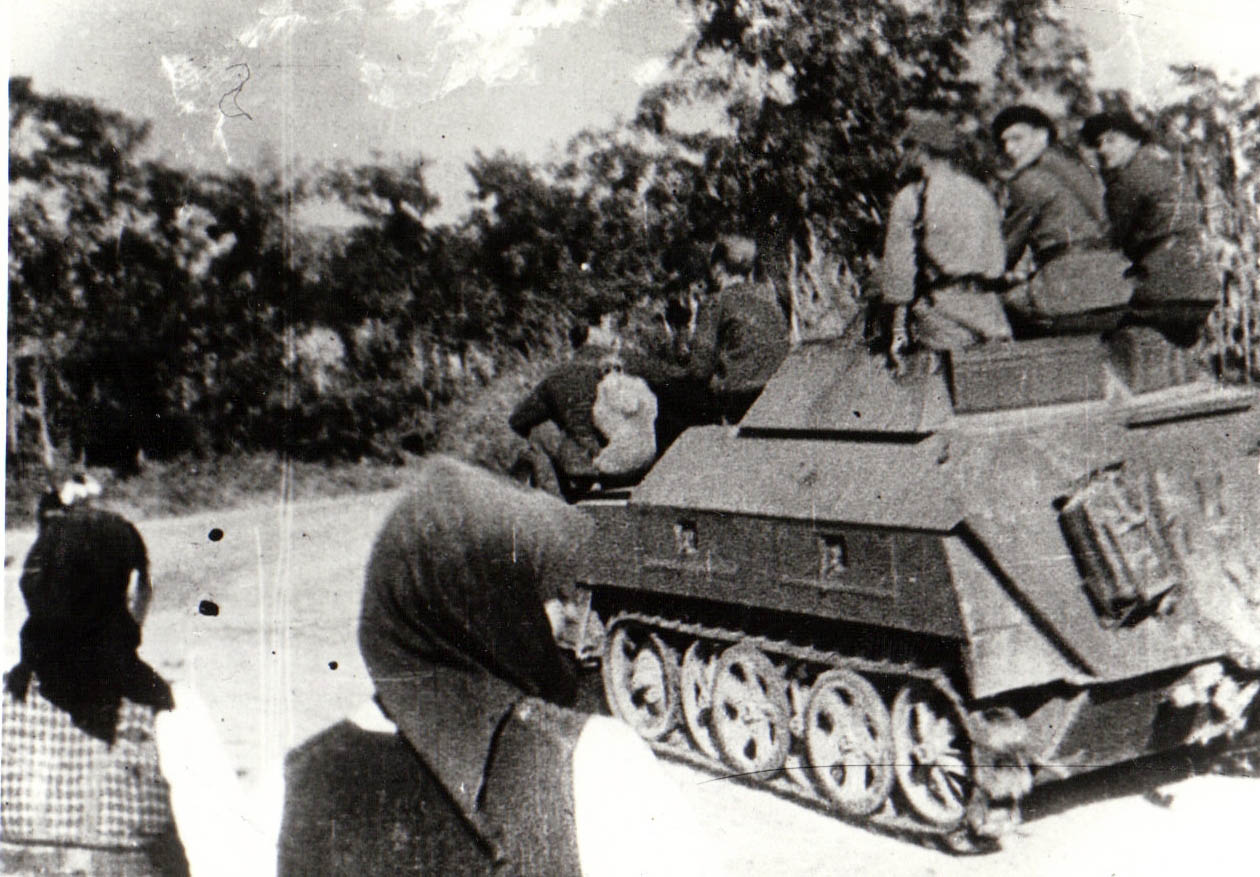
Romanian soldiers in Transylvania, September–October 1944

On 15 September, the Soviets and Romanians launched a major attack south of Turda, preceded by a heavy artillery bombardment. They broke again in the eastern sector all the way to the outskirts of the town, but were once again stopped by the counterattack of the 2nd Armored Division. A temporary lull in the fighting ensued, which the Hungarians used to prepare for a counterattack. On 19 September, the 25th Infantry Division—supported by the 10th Assault Gun Battalion with Zrínyi IIs—attacked the Soviet 4th Guards Rifle Division, after a brief artillery barrage. They gained some ground, but the Soviets fought tenaciously and held their ground despite heavy losses. The Soviets counterattacked with three Soviet and one Romanian division—supported by a tank brigade and a Romanian armored detachment—on 22 September. The 2nd Armored Division counterattacked with only 57 tanks and could not stop them. The Hungarians lost over 1,000 men on this day alone.

== Conclusion and aftermath ==
On 23 September, the German 23rd Panzer Division arrived to relieve the exhausted 2nd Armored Division, but was not able to stabilize the situation, while losing over one third of its infantry. The Soviets and Romanians at this point had also suffered heavy losses, and they concentrated their attacks on another sector. The 25th Infantry Division remained in Turda until 8 October, when the remaining Axis forces retreated, in order to shorten their lines.

After the battle, the entire enlisted body of the III./25 ID and another company was promoted one rank up for bravery on the battlefield, an unprecedented move in the history of the Royal Hungarian Army and its forebears.

== See also ==
- "Aniversări locale în luna octombrie: 73 de ani de la eliberarea Turzii de sub ocupația hitleristo-horthystă". www.ziarul21.ro (in Romanian). October 12, 2017.
- Pădurean, Bianca (September 17, 2018). "Pagina de istorie: Masacrul de la Oarba de Mureș, un Katyn românesc" (in Romanian). RFI România. Archived from the original on January 11, 2024.
- Dologa, Laurențiu (September 21, 2013). "Mărturiile ultimilor eroi: Un supraviețuitor al infernului de la Oarba de Mureș (II)". ziare.com (in Romanian).
- Ploeșteanu, Grigore; Suciu, Vasile T.; Lădariu, Lazăr (1985), Epopeea de pe Mureș (PDF), Documentele continuității (in Romanian), Târgu Mureș: Revista Vatra, OCLC 895783668
- Grigorescu, Ioachim (2019), "Sfântu Gheorghe, primul oraș românesc eliberat după patru ani de la ocuparea acestuia în urma Dictatului de la Viena" (PDF), Rezerva Oștirii Române (in Romanian), 21 (2(41)): 53–54
- Protopopescu, George (1981), "O pagină de eroism românesc – Oarba de Mureș, 1944" (PDF), Acta Musei Napocensis, 18: 291–301
