= General Major (disambiguation) =

General Major is a rank in certain militaries.

General Major may also refer to:

- James Patrick Major (1836–1877), Confederate States Army brigadier general
- Jenő Major (1891–1972), Royal Hungarian Army colonel general

== See also ==
- Attorney General Major (disambiguation)
- Macrianus Major (died 261), Roman usurper in the battle of Edessa
