= Gheorghe Avramescu =

Romanian general

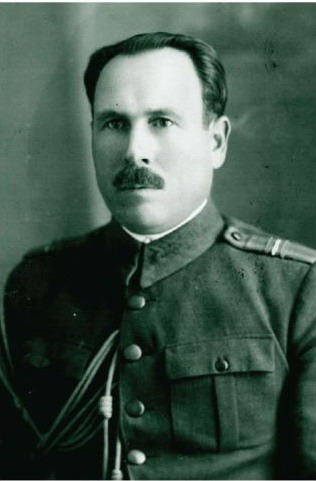
- Avramescu in 1931–1935
- Born: 26 January 1884; Botoșani, Botoșani County, Kingdom of Romania
- Died: 3 March 1945 (aged 61); Jászberény, Kingdom of Hungary
- Burial place: Cimitirul Militar, Cluj-Napoca
- Education: Higher War School
- Spouse: Adela Avramescu (m. 1913)
- Children: Felicia Avramescu-Sturdza (1918–1945)
- Military career
- Allegiance: Kingdom of Romania
- Branch: Army
- Service years: 1906–1945
- Rank: General
- Unit: 4th Army
- Conflicts: Second Balkan War; World War I; Battle of the Argeș; Battle of Mărășești; World War II–Eastern Front; Operation München; Siege of Sevastopol; Battle of the Sea of Azov; Crimean campaign; Second Jassy–Kishinev Offensive; Battle of Turda; Battle of Carei; Battle of Debrecen
- Awards: Order of Michael the Brave, 3rd Class; Order of Michael the Brave, 2nd Class; Order of Michael the Brave, 2nd Class (With Swords); Order of the Star of Romania, Knight class Order of the Crown (Romania), Grand Officer Class; Iron Cross, 2nd Class; Iron Cross, 1st Class; German Cross, in Gold
- Memorials: Bust in Cluj-Napoca

Gheorghe Avramescu (26 January 1884 – 3 March 1945) was a Romanian Lieutenant General during World War II. In 1945, he died in Slovakia during a German air attack, while under the arrest of the NKVD.

== Early life ==
Avramescu was born Botoșani on 26 January 1884, the son of farmers Vasile and Aglaia Avramescu. He attended the A. T. Laurian High School between 1898 and 1906. He then enrolled in the Military School of Infantry and Cavalry in Bucharest, graduating in 1908 with the rank of second lieutenant, and being promoted to first lieutenant in 1911. After serving in the Second Balkan War in 1913, he was admitted to the Higher War School, and promoted to captain in 1915.

== World War I and Interwar ==
When Romania entered World War I in August 1916 on the side of the Allied powers, Avramescu fought with the Dobruja Army, under the command of Russian General Andrei Zayonchkovski, and saw action against the German forces of General August von Mackensen. In November he took command of the 2nd Battalion from the 38th Regiment, and fought in December at the Battle of the Argeș, falling back towards Moldavia in a series of defensive actions. For his valor in these engagements he was awarded in 1917 the Order of the Star of Romania, Knight class. In the summer of 1917 he fought at the Battle of Mărășești; for his service he was awarded the Order of the Crown, Grand Officer Class, and was promoted to major on 1 September 1917.

In the interwar period he advanced to lieutenant colonel in 1923, colonel in 1929, brigadier general in 1935, and major general in 1940. At various times, he was in command of the 1st Division Vânători de munte, the 10th Infantry Division, and the III Army Corps.

== World War II ==
Avramescu served as General Officer Commanding of a number of army units: the 10th Division in 1941, the Mountain Corps in June 1941, the III Corps in October 1943, the VI Corps in February 1944, and the 4th Army from 1944 to 1945.

At the head of the Mountain Corps, he participated in Operation München, the Battle of the Sea of Azov, the Crimean campaign, and the Siege of Sevastopol. After the fall of Sevastopol, his Corps occupied Crimea.

For his service during the Crimean campaign, Avramescu was promoted on 18 July 1942 to lieutenant general (general de corp de armată), and was awarded the Order of the Crown, Grand Officer Class (29 July 1942), the Order of Michael the Brave, 2nd Class (1 September 1942), and the German Cross, in Gold (25 October 1942).

After the crushing defeat in the Battle of Stalingrad, in which he didn't participate, the Romanian Army was driven back to its own country during 1943 and the first half of 1944. In August 1944, on the eve of the Soviet Second Jassy–Kishinev Offensive, he took de facto command of the 4th Army, since general Ioan Mihail Racoviță was "away on leave" (preparing King Michael's Coup). Avramescu could not prevent the disastrous defeat, because of the limited number of armored and motorized units at his disposal. In the morning of 23 August, he and General Petre Dumitrescu were dismissed by Marshal Ion Antonescu and replaced by Ilie Șteflea.

After Antonescu was arrested later that day during the Royal Coup, Avramescu was recalled to command the 4th Army on the side of the Soviets against the Germans and the Hungarians. He fought many battles with his 4th Army, including the Battle of Turda and the Battle of Debrecen, and was in command at the Battle of Carei, the last engagement of the war within the present borders of Romania.

Avramescu complained repeatedly to the Soviets about the lack of supplies and impossible tasks for his Army. After several soldiers under his command, known for their support for the fascist Iron Guard, defected to the Nazis, the Romanian High Command, suspecting Avramescu might secretly harbour pro-German views, decided to relieve him of command on 11 January 1945, and put him on reserve. Nevertheless, he was promoted to general on 9 February and recalled to duty at the request of the Soviet Marshal Rodion Malinovsky. Returning to the front, he successfully led the 4th Army in the assault on the Zvolen–Banská Bystrica line, in what was the prelude to the Bratislava–Brno Offensive in Slovakia.

== Death ==
On 2 March 1945, when on the Slovak front, General Avramescu was summoned by the commander of the Soviet 40th Army. After one hour, the Romanian delegation was told that Avramescu and the 40th Army commander, General Filipp Zhmachenko, left for the command post of the 2nd Ukrainian Front, as they were expected there by Marshal Rodion Malinovsky, leading later commentators to assert General Avramescu was arrested by the NKVD.

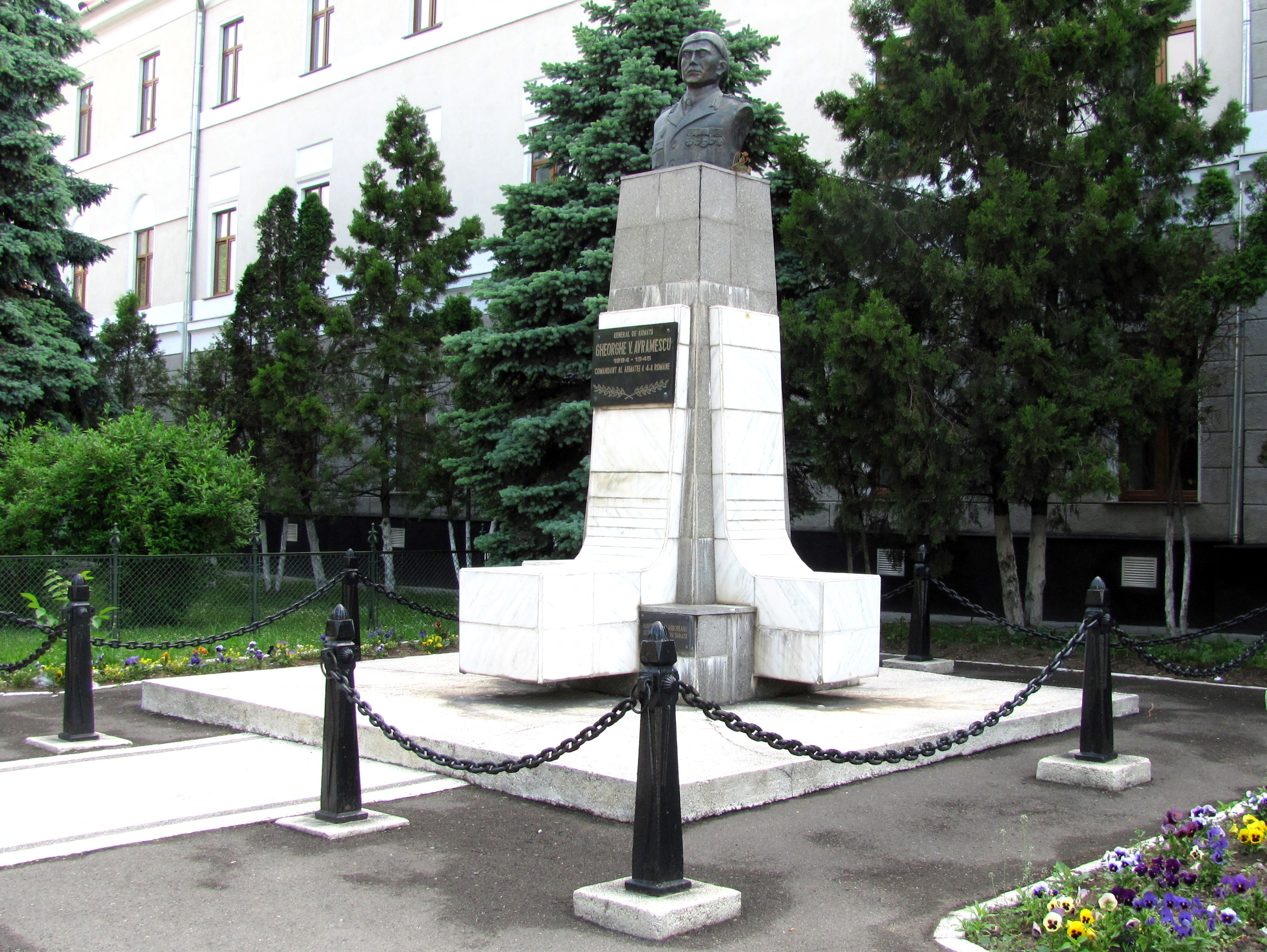
Bust of Avramescu in Ștefan cel Mare Square, Cluj-Napoca

The Romanian 4th Army was placed under command of General Nicolae Dăscălescu, who struggled to find out what had happened to Avrămescu. Zhmachenko advised him to find information about Avramescu at the Romanian Ministry of Defence or the Romanian General Staff. According to the Soviets, Avramescu was killed on 3 March 1945 in an aerial attack on the car that was transporting him. The general was the only occupant of the car to be killed; at least 3 other occupants were NKVD officers. According to the official report issued on 23 March 1945 by NKVD head Lavrentiy Beria, Avramescu was hit by a bullet through the car's windshield. He was buried in a cemetery in the Sashalom neighborhood of Budapest.

Also on 3 March 1945, Adela, Avramescu's wife and Felicia Avramescu-Sturdza, his daughter, were arrested and sent to Siberia. His daughter committed suicide; according to Soviet sources, this happened on 6 March 1945. Adela returned to Romania in 1956.

On 23 October 2000, his remains were brought back to Romania and were reburied with military honours at the Military Cemetery of Cluj-Napoca. A bust of Avramescu has been erected in the city's Ștefan cel Mare Square. Streets in Botoșani, Brăila, and Târgu Mureș, as well as a school in Prăjești bear his name. The 24th "General Gheorghe Avramescu" Vânători de munte Battalion is headquartered in Miercurea Ciuc.
