= Horea, Cloșca și Crișan Division =

Soviet Romanian military unit (established 1945)

Horea, Cloșca și Crișan Division Divizia "Horea, Cloșca și Crișan"
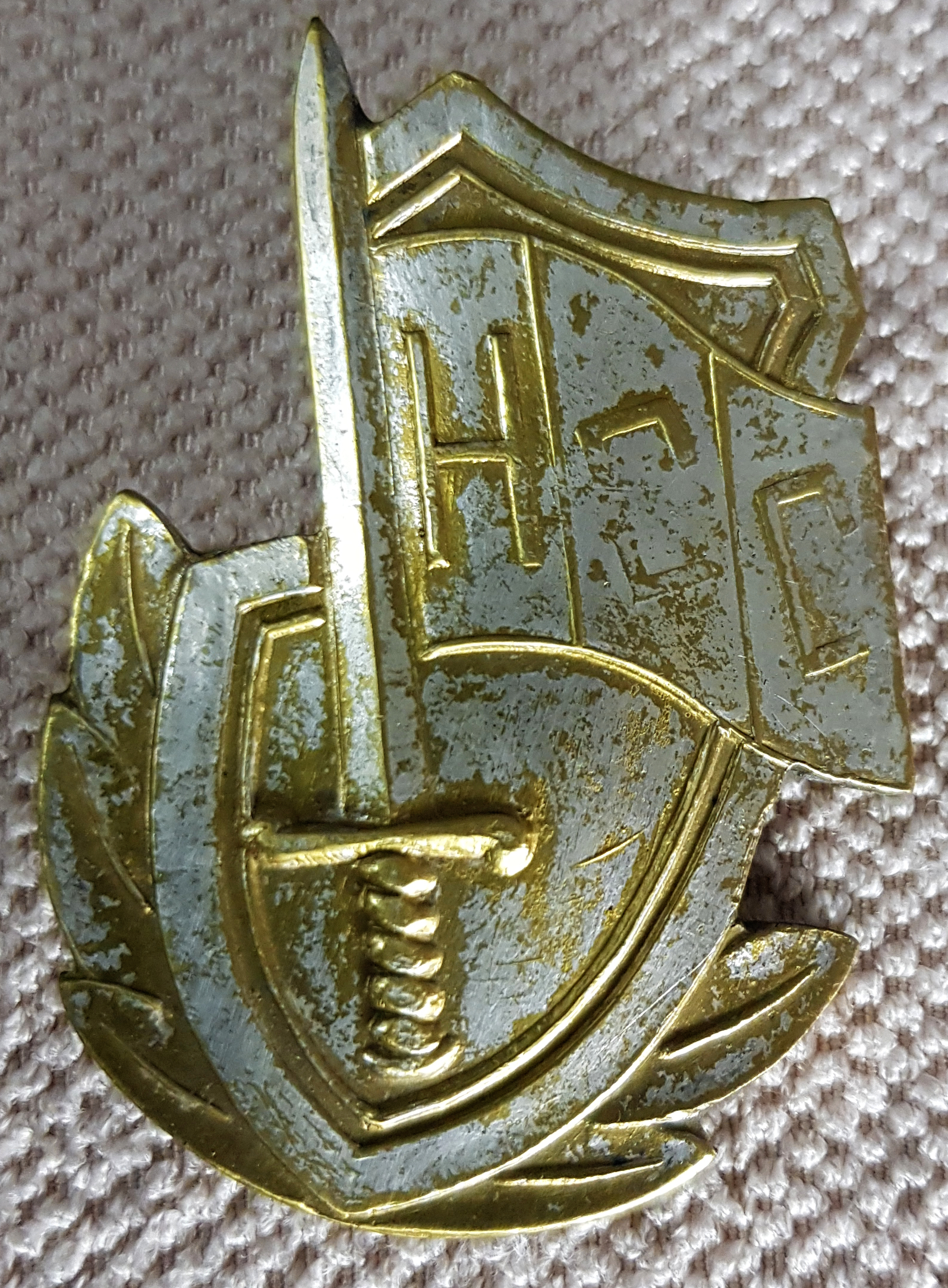
- Active: 12 April 1945–15 August 1945
- Country: Romania; formation equipped and supplied by Soviet Union
- Branch: (Soviet Union) Red Army (2nd Ukrainian Front)
- Type: Division
- Patron: Revolt of Horea, Cloșca, and Crișan
- Commander: Mihail Lascăr

The Horea, Cloșca și Crișan Division (full name: Romanian 2nd Volunteer Infantry Division 'Horea, Cloșca și Crișan' ) was established in April 1945 from Romanian volunteers, mostly prisoners of war, but also Communist activists such as Valter Roman. It was created by the Soviet Union at Kotovsk, and named after the Revolt of Horea, Cloșca and Crișan.

== History ==
Its first leader was General Mihail Lascăr, who had been taken prisoner in November 1942, during the Battle of Stalingrad. General Lascăr commanded the division from 12 April to 12 September 1945. The division did not see combat in World War II.

In late 1945 the division was reported to have been integrated into the Romanian 4th Army. Under the firm control of Romanian communists and backed by Red Army troops, the HCsC Division was a key instrument with which the Soviets established complete communist control of Romania after the war against the wishes of the regular Romanian Land Forces. By 1947, the HCsC Division, along with its sister unit, the Tudor Vladimirescu Division, was motorised and partially equipped with tanks, giving the two divisions a significant advantage in mobility and firepower.

From 1954 the division's lineage appears to have been merged with that of the previous 1st Cavalry Division. The Independent Cavalry Division became the Inspectorate General of Cavalry in 1897, Divizia I Cavalerie Independenta in 1913, Brigada 1 Cavalerie in 1948, Divizia 59 Cavalerie in 1953, Divizia 91 Mecanizată "Horea, Cloșca și Crișan" in 1954, 6th Mechanised Division "Horea, Cloșca și Crișan" in 1956, Divizia 6 Tancuri "Horea, Cloșca și Crișan" in 1964.

In 1989, as part of the Fourth Army, its composition was reported as:

- HQ 6th Tank Division /Horea, Cloșca și Crișan/ -Târgu Mureș :
  - 2nd Tank Regiment -Târgu Mureș : with T-55/A/AM2 tanks, TAB-71M and R-1451 apc-s, TABC-79 recon vehicles, MR-4 quad 14,5mm aa hmg-s, SR-114/-132, DAC-443T and -665T trucks, T-55T evacuation tanks, MTP-2/BTR-60 recovery apc-s,
  - 5th Tank Regiment -Turda : same as the 2nd
  - 6th Tank Regiment -Aiud : same
  - 4th Mechanised Regiment -Zalău : with TR-77 tanks, TAB-71/-71M apc-s, TABC-79 recon vehicles, SU-76 self-propelled guns, ZiS-3 76mm field guns, Md.1982 120mm mortars, ?? TAB-71AR with 82mm mortars, AG-9 RRs, MR-4 quad 14.5mm AA HMGs, DAC-443T and -665T trucks, TER-800 evacuation tank, TERA-71L recovery APCs,
  - 20th Artillery Regiment -Târnăveni ??: with M-30 122mm how., D-20 152mm how., APR-21 122mm MRLs, SR-114 and DAC-444 trucks, ATS-59G or TAR-76 artillery tractors, TAB-71A-PCOMA command vehicles,
  - 166th Recon Battalion -Târgu Mureș :with BRDM-2 recon vehicles and DAC-444T and SR-114D trucks,
  - 216th AA Artillery Battalion -Târgu Mureș

In 1994 it was transformed into the 6th Army Corps "Horea, Cloșca și Crișan", and in 2000 into Brigada 6 Tancuri "Horea, Cloșca și Crișan".

Later the division appears to have become the 6th Tank Division and was based at Târgu Mureș.

== See also ==
- Tudor Vladimirescu Division
- Romania in World War II
