= Battle of Romania =

1944 battle on the Eastern Front of World War II

Coordinates: 46°00′N 25°00′E

- Part of World War II
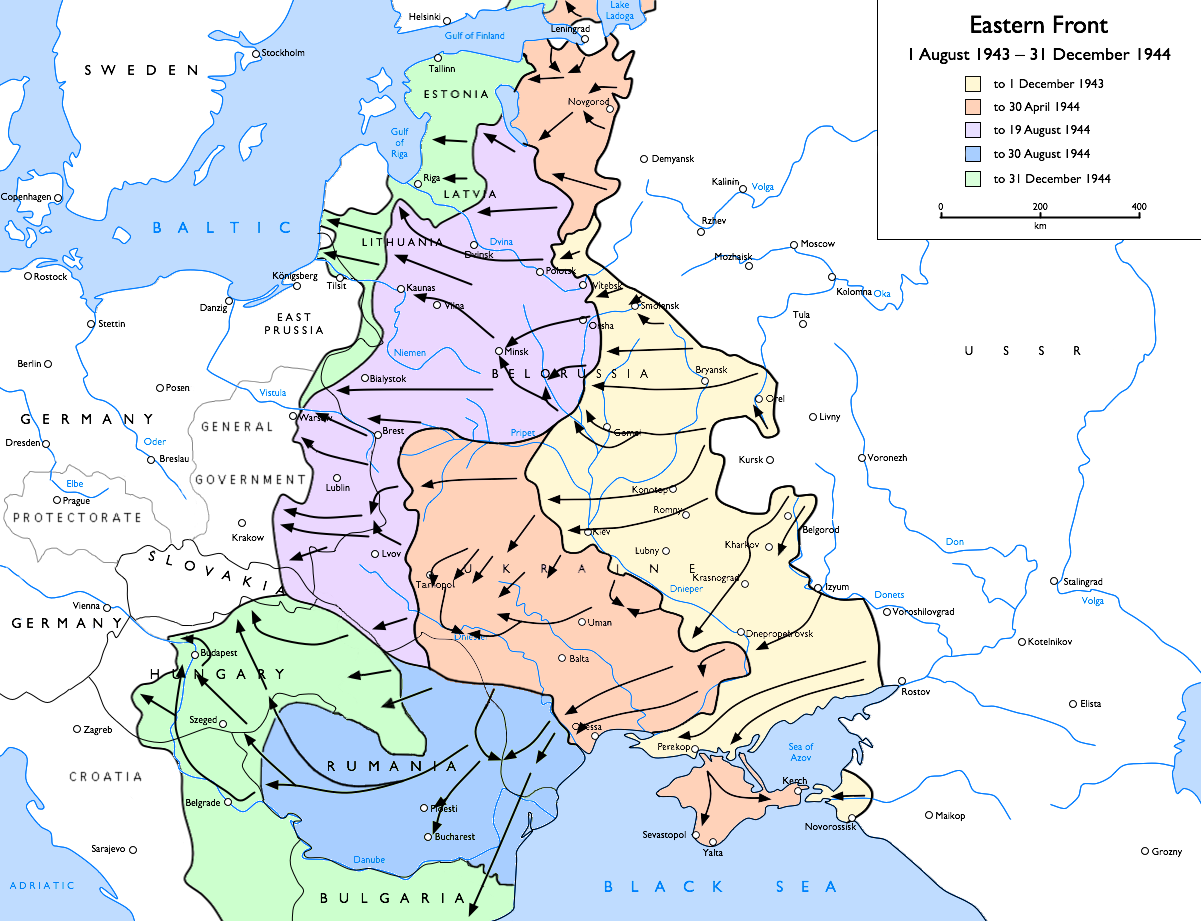
- Red Army offensives in 1943–1944. The Battle of Romania is covered by the blue area.
Date	5 March 1944 – 24 September 1944 (6 months, 2 weeks and 5 days)
Location	Romania
Result	Allied victory: Romania defects to the Allies following a coup d'état

Belligerents
Soviet Union; Romania (from 23 August)	Germany; Romania (until 23 August); Hungary

Commanders and leaders
(Soviet Union) Joseph Stalin (Soviet Union) Rodion Malinovsky (Soviet Union) Fyodor Tolbukhin (Kingdom of Romania) Michael I	(Kingdom of Romania) Ion Antonescu (executed) (Nazi Germany) Johannes Friessner (Nazi Germany) Maximilian Fretter-Pico

Units involved
on 20 August: (Soviet Union) 2nd Ukrainian Front; (Soviet Union) 3rd Ukrainian Front	on 20 August: (Kingdom of Romania) 4th Army; (Nazi Germany) 6th Army; (Kingdom of Romania) 3rd Army

Strength
1,000,000+	1,000,000+

Casualties and losses
Unknown	+500,000 killed

The Battle of Romania in World War II comprised several operations in or around Romania in 1944, as part of the Eastern Front, in which the Soviet Army defeated Axis (German and Romanian) forces in the area, Romania changed sides, and Soviet and Romanian forces drove the Germans back into Hungary.

Soviet troops entered Romanian territory during the Uman–Botoșani offensive in March 1944, capturing several towns in northern Moldavia, including Botoșani.

According to historian David Glantz, the Soviet Union first attempted to invade Romania during the spring of 1944, through the territory of present-day Moldova. Between 8 April and 6 June, the Soviet Army launched the first Jassy–Kishinev offensive, so named after two major cities Iași (Jassy) and Chișinău (Kishinev) in the area. A series of military engagements took place, with the objective of cutting off vital Axis defensive lines in Northern Romania, thus facilitating a subsequent advance by the Red Army into the entire Balkan region. Soviet forces failed to overcome German and Romanian defenses in the region. According to Glantz, the offensive operation ultimately failed, mainly due to the poor combat performance of Soviet troops and the effectiveness of German defensive preparations.

Military operations in Romania, 23–31 August 1944: red = Soviet Red Army; yellow = Romanian troops; blue = Axis forces, frontlines

The major attack of the Battle of Romania – the second Jassy–Kishinev offensive, between 20 August and 29 August – was a Soviet victory. The German Sixth Army was encircled by the initial Soviet onslaught and was destroyed for the second time (the first time was at the Battle of Stalingrad).

On 23 August, King Michael of Romania led a coup d'état against Prime Minister Ion Antonescu; the new government surrendered to the Allies and declared war on Germany. Romanian historian Florin Constantiniu claims this shortened World War II in Europe by six months.

The Axis front collapsed. In the north, the German Eighth Army retreated to Hungary with heavy losses. Elsewhere, many German forces were cut off and captured, such as the large security and anti-aircraft force posted at the Ploiești oil field. Other fragments of the German forces fled toward Hungary as best they could, fighting the Soviets and the recently defected Romanians, which stormed through the Carpathian Mountains. (Several passes through the mountains were held by Romanian troops.)

The Soviet victory in Romania caused Bulgaria to withdraw from the Axis on 26 August, and allowed Soviet forces to invade it on 8 September.

By 24 September, nearly all of Romania was under Soviet control. Romania's defect initiated a collapse of many countries on the eastern front. The Soviet forces, now able to move through Romanian territory without opposition, captured nearly 120,000 Romanian soldiers (POW's) and sent them to concentration camps inside the Soviet Union where most perished through labor work or malnutrition.

The German forces meanwhile regrouped in Hungary with the aid of Hungarian forces using high ground positions on the hills of Buda in Budapest.

It was at this time Hitler declared the Hungarian city of Budapest a Fortress city, and to be defended at all costs. The German and Hungarian forces stood their ground fighting relentlessly even door to door as the Soviet forces continued entering the city.
