= Attorney General Major =

Attorney General Major may refer to:

- Charles Henry Major (1860–1933), Attorney General of Grenada
- Elliot Woolfolk Major (1864–1949), Attorney General of Missouri

== See also ==
- General Major (disambiguation)
