= Fourth Army (Romania) =

- Armata a 4-a
- Active: August 1916 – June 1947; April 1980–2000
- Country: Romania
- Branch: Romanian Land Forces
- Garrison/HQ: Cluj-Napoca
- Anniversaries: 15 August
- Engagements: World War I; First Battle of Oituz; Battle of the Eastern Carpathians; Battle of Prunaru; Battle of Bucharest; Hungarian–Romanian War; World War II; Operation München; Siege of Odessa; Siege of Sevastopol; Battle of Stalingrad; First Jassy–Kishinev offensive; Battle of Târgu Frumos; Battle of Turda; Prague Offensive

Commanders
- Notable commanders: Marshal Constantin Prezan; Nicolae Ciupercă; General Mihail Lascăr; General Constantin Constantinescu-Claps; General Ioan Mihail Racoviță; General Gheorghe Avramescu

The Fourth Army (Romanian: Armata a 4-a) was a field army (a military formation) of the Romanian Land Forces active from 1916 to 2000. Its successor is the 4th Infantry Division.

== History ==
=== World War I ===
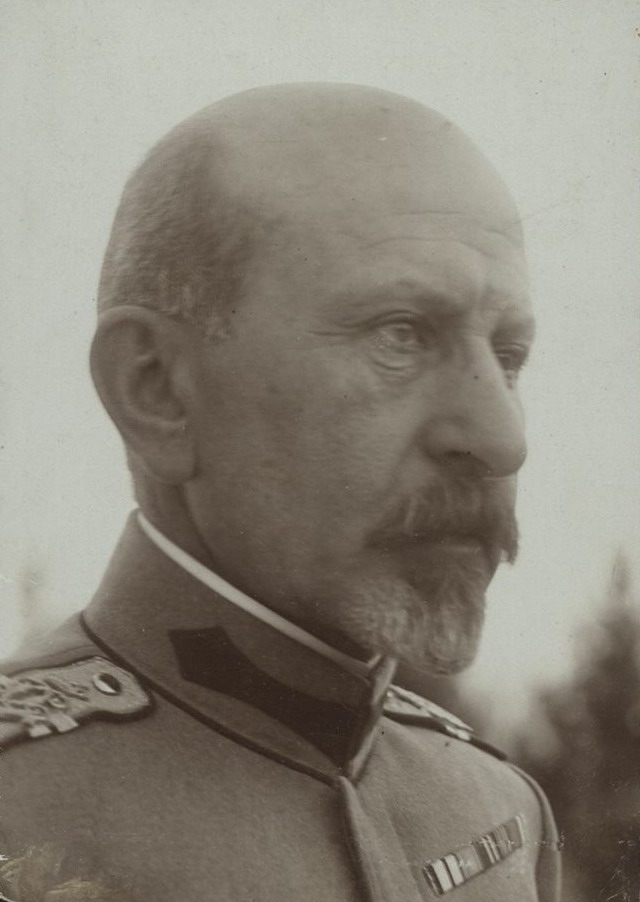
Constantin Prezan

The Fourth Army fought under the name of "Northern Army" or "Army of the North" (Armata de Nord) in the Romanian Campaign of World War I, under the command of General Constantin Prezan. Units under its command took part in the First Battle of Oituz, Battle of the Eastern Carpathians, Battle of Prunaru, and the Battle of Bucharest. As Russian forces took over its front, the Northern Army was disbanded in December 1916 and its units were redeployed to other fronts, under command of the 1st and 2nd Romanian Armies.

The commanders of the Northern Army were:

- Divisional General Constantin Prezan: 15 August 1916 – 9 November 1916
- Divisional General Constantin Cristescu: 10 November 1916 – 5 December 1916

On 10 November 1918, Romania re-entered the war on the side of the Allied forces. After the end of the war and the proclamation of the Union of Transylvania with Romania on 1 December 1918, the Fourth Army was reorganized as the Transylvania Army and participated in the Hungarian–Romanian War, reaching Budapest by 3 August 1919.

The commanders of the Transylvania Army were:

- Divisional General Traian Moșoiu: 11 December 1918 – 12 April 1919
- Divisional General Gheorghe Mărdărescu: 12 April 1919 – 5 December 1919

=== World War II ===
On 22 June 1941, at the start of Operation Barbarossa, the 4th Army consisted of the following units.

- The 3rd Army Corps (Guards, 15th, and 35th Reserve Divisions).
- The 5th Army Corps (Border Division and 21st Division).
- The 11th Army Corps (two fortress brigades).
- The 4th Army Cooperation Command.

The 4th Army was under the command of Lieutenant General Nicolae Ciupercă. In 1942, it fought on the Axis side as part of the German Army Group B. In July 1941 it took part in Operation München, the recapturing of Bessarabia and Northern Bukovina, which were annexed by the Soviet Union the year before.

By August 1941, during the Siege of Odessa, the 4th Army had under command the 1st, 3rd, 4th, 5th, 6th, and 11th Army Corps under its control, with a total of 17 infantry divisions, the 1st Armoured Division (Romania), three cavalry divisions, and a total of 38 artillery regiments. On 9 November 1941, Constantin Constantinescu-Claps was appointed the commander of the Fourth Army, and became a Corps General on 24 January 1942. On 10 February 1943, he was relieved of his assignment and replaced by Constantin Sănătescu.

From late 1942 to early 1943, the Fourth Army was almost entirely destroyed during the Battle of Stalingrad; the Romanian Third Army suffered a similar fate (see Romanian armies in the Battle of Stalingrad). During April–May 1944, the Romanian forces led by General Ioan Mihail Racoviță, together with elements of the German Eighth Army were responsible for defending Northern Romania during the Soviet First Jassy-Kishinev Offensive, and took part in the Battles of Târgu Frumos.

In August 1944, the Red Army entered Romania after driving back Army Group South from the region. On 23 August, Marshal Ion Antonescu was dismissed by King Michael I, and Romania declared war on Germany and Hungary some days later. The Soviets took control of the oilfields in the Ploiești area, and the Romanian Army was used to fight German forces on the Eastern Front.

The Fourth Army became one of the Romanian armies fighting for the Red Army on the Eastern Front. In its campaign from August 1944 to May 1945, the Romanian Army lost some 64,000 men. The Fourth Army took part in Soviet offensives, notably at Prague in May 1945, which happened to be the last offensive it took part in World War II.

The Fourth Army was involved in the Battle of Turda which lasted from 5 September to 8 October 1944, in the area around Turda. Troops from the Hungarian 2nd Army and the German 8th Army fought a defensive action against the Fourth Army and the Red Army. The battle was one of the largest fought in Transylvania during World War II.

In the Prague Offensive, the Fourth Army, together with the Romanian First Army and Polish Second Army, formed part of the Soviet 2nd Ukrainian Front. Marshal Ivan Konev, the commander of the First Ukrainian Front, was the main Soviet commander in the area. Together with Marshal Georgy Zhukov's First Byelorussian Front, Konev launched the great attack on 16 April that resulted in the fall of Berlin and Soviet victory on the Eastern Front.

The offensive started on 6 May, a few days before the end of the war. German resistance in the east was now limited to small pockets scattered across Germany, Czechoslovakia, and Austria. The remnants of Army Group Center held the remaining German-controlled areas in the east. In the attack on Prague, German resistance was defeated in the city, and the Soviet, Romanian, and Polish forces entered the city on 9 May. Czech partisans had been fighting the Germans there for a few days. By 11 and 12 May, all remaining German pockets of resistance in the east were defeated.

=== World War II Commanders ===
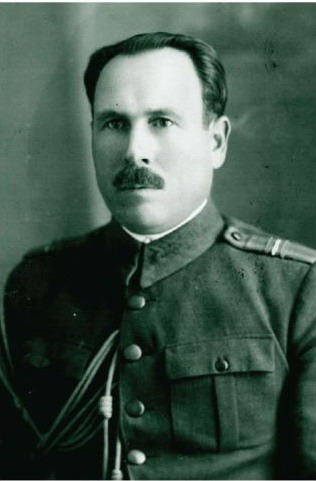
Gheorghe Avramescu

- General lieutenant Nicolae Ciupercă (2 June 1940 – 9 September 1941)
- General lieutenant Iosif Iacobici (10 September 1941 – 8 November 1941)
- General lieutenant Constantin Constantinescu-Claps (9 November 1941 – 10 February 1943)
- General lieutenant Constantin Sănătescu (11 February 1943 – 24 January 1944)
- General lieutenant Ioan Mihail Racoviță (25 January 1944 – 23 August 1944)
- General lieutenant Ilie Șteflea (23 August 1944 – 3 September 1944)
- General lieutenant Gheorghe Avramescu (4 September 1944 – 11 January 1945)
- General lieutenant Nicolae Dăscălescu (12 January 1945 – 18 February 1945)
- General lieutenant Gheorghe Avramescu (19 February 1945 – 2 March 1945)
- General lieutenant Nicolae Dăscălescu (3 March 1945 – 12 May 1945)

=== The Post-War Situation ===
The Fourth Army was active after the war until 1947. In 1945, it comprised two army corps: 2nd Army Corps, at Bucharest, with Divizia de Gardă and 1st "Tudor Vladimirescu" Volunteer Division, 2nd Heavy Artillery Regiment, 2nd Pioneer Regiment, 4th Călărași Regiment, and corps units; 7th Army Corps, at Sibiu, with 2nd Infantry Division, the 2nd "Horea, Cloșca și Crișan" Volunteer Division, 1st Heavy Artillery Regiment, 7th Pioneer Regiment, 1st Călărași Regiment, and corps units.

From March 1945 to June 1947, the generals in command were Nicolae Dăscălescu, Gheorghe Stavrescu, Mihail Lascăr, Constantin Vasiliu-Rășcanu, and C. Nicolau. 4th Army Command was disbanded on 5 June 1947, under the Order M. St.M. nr. no. 40.500, and all units were redeployed. By Royal Decree 1346 of 28 June 1947, the 3rd Military Region, based in Cluj, was established starting 1 July 1947.

=== The Cold War ===
The 3rd Military Region, formed after the war in Cluj, changed its name to 3rd Army Command on 30 April 1960. During this time, the training of the officers and the band was made in the new concept of country defense and national military doctrine. Thousands of soldiers participated in the national economy, including the harvest. The army troops participated massively at removing the effects of the catastrophic floods of 1970 and 1975 and of the 1977 Vrancea earthquake. The intervention of some Warsaw Pact states in Czechoslovakia (except Romania) and the invasion of this country in August 1968, led to profound changes in the structure of 3rd Army Command. At that time, there began the formation of the new 81st Mechanized Division (at Dej), the existing 11th and 18th Mechanized Divisions (from Oradea and Timișoara) were strengthened, as was the 6th Tank Division (from Târgu Mureș). In the next year (1969), it was appreciated that the fighting capacity of the 3rd Army Command grew by over 75% from the point of view of the personnel, and about 55% in regards to military equipment.

Doctrinal reasons, as well as the tense political-military situation in the 1980s, resulted in the organization of the Romanian Land Forces on four army headquarters. Starting with 5 April 1980, the 3rd Army Command changed its name again to 4th Army Command with its headquarters located in Cluj-Napoca.

In 1989, the 4th Army Command was reported to consist of the 6th Tank Division (Targu Mureș), named as Horia, Cloșca și Crișan Division, the 11th Mechanised Division "Carei" (Oradea), and the 81st Mechanised Division "Someș" (Dej), as well as smaller units: the 1st Mountain Bde, 5th Mountain Bde, and 37th Tactical Missile Brigade.

The 11th Mechanised Division "Carei" reportedly consisted of the following units:

- 21st Mech. Rgt. -Oradea : with TR-77 tanks, TAB-71M apc-s, MLI-84 ifv-s, TABC-79 recon vehicles, SU-76 sp guns, ZiS-3 76mm field guns, Md.1982 120mm mortars, ?? TAB-71AR with 82mm mortars, AG-9 rr-s, MR-4 quad 14,5mm aa hmg-s, DAC-443T and -665T trucks, TER-580 evacuation tank, TERA-71L recovery apc-s.
- 23rd Mech. Rgt. -Beiuș -same.
- 19th Mech. Rgt. -Arad -same.
- 21st Tank Rgt. -Oradea: with TR-77 tanks, BTR-50PK and PU apc-s, TABC-79 recon vehicles, TAB-71A R-1451 command apc, MR-2 quad 14,5mm aa hmg-s, DAC-443T and -665T trucks, TER-580 evacuation tanks, MTP/BTR-50P recovery apc-s.
- 26th Artillery Regiment -Ineu: with M-30 122mm how., Md.1981 152mm how., APR-40 122mm mrls, SR-114 and DAC-444 trucks, TMA-83 arty tractors, TABC-79A-POMA and TAB-77A-PCOMA command vehicles.
- 119th Recon Battalion -Oradea: with TABC-79 recon vehicles and DAC-444T trucks.

=== Present ===
Since 17 October 1990 the 4th Army Command has borne the honorary name of "Transylvania", which it also bore after the Great Union in the Hungarian–Romanian War. After 1992, five motorized infantry battalions were set up in the garrisons of Satu Mare, Carei, Salonta, Marghita, and Chișineu-Criș. Between 1993 and 1995, as a consequence of the reorganization of the entire army, all existing mechanized and tank divisions were disbanded, and new headquarters were established: the 5th, 6th, and 7th Army Corps Commands, in Timișoara, Târgu Mureș, and Dej. In May 1994, the territorial troops became subordinate to the Army Troops. On 1 August 1995, the 4th Army Command "Transylvania" had 3 Army Corps commands, 23 brigade-sized units, and a number of other formations and directly subordinate structures.

The Fourth Army was redesignated as the 4th Territorial Army Corps in 2000 and subsequently as the 4th Infantry Division in 2008.
