= Lajos Veress =

Hungarian general

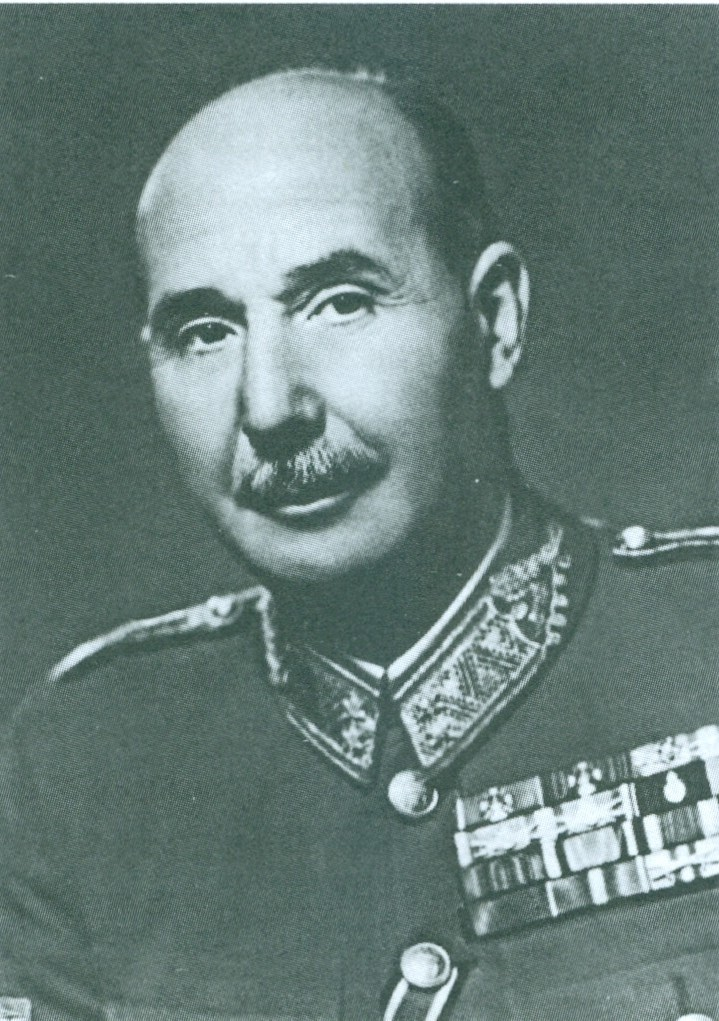
- Born: 4 October 1889; Sepsiszentgyörgy, Austria-Hungary (now Sfântu Gheorghe, Romania)
- Died: 29 March 1976 (aged 86); London, England, United Kingdom
- Burial place: Alba Regia Chapel in Berkeley Springs, West Virginia, United States
- Military career
- Allegiance: Austria-Hungary (to 1918); Kingdom of Hungary
- Branch: Austro-Hungarian Army; Royal Hungarian Army
- Service years: 1910–1944, 1946
- Rank: Colonel General
- Commands: Hungarian Second Army
- Conflicts: World War II; Battle of Turda

Lajos Veress de Dálnok (4 October 1889 - 29 March 1976) was a Hungarian military officer, who served as commander of the Hungarian Second Army during the Second World War.

Veress was born into a Székely noble family. He finished his studies at the Ludovica Military Academy in 1910 and served as chief of staff of the Cavalry Division between 1933 and 1935. After that he had been a military attaché to Vienna in 1935–1938. From 1938 to 1940 he served as commander of the 15th Infantry Brigade. In 1940 he was the leader of the 2nd Cavalry Brigade as major general. Soon he was promoted to lieutenant general and fought at the Don Front as commander of the First Armoured Division. Between 1942 and 1944 he served as commander of the 9th Corps. He was appointed commander of the Second Army on 1 April 1944.

Before the beginning of the surrender negotiations with the Allies Regent Miklós Horthy, who tried to step out of the war, was appointed him homo regius (the regent's deputy) if Horthy would be indisposed. As a result of his pro-German officers' betrayal, the German army arrested Veress and gave to the Arrow Cross authorities; a military court sentenced him to fifteen years. He was imprisoned on 16 October 1944 in Sopronkőhida but later successfully escaped. He retired in 1946.

Veress was sentenced to death on 16 April 1947 on charges of right-wing, anti-state conspiracy by a People's Tribunal. The National Council of People's Tribunals then mitigated and changed the sentence to life imprisonment. He was released during the 1956 uprising and left the country on 3 November 1956. From 1958 he served as chairman of the World Federation of Hungarian Freedom Fighters. Veress died in London. He was buried in Berkeley Springs, West Virginia.

== Awards and decorations ==

1st row	Golden Military Merit Medal on war ribbon with swords (12. October 1944)	Order of Merit of the Kingdom of Hungary Commander's Cross with Star on war ribbon with swords (17. November 1942)	Order of Merit of the Kingdom of Hungary Commander's Cross with Star on war ribbon (4. December 1943)	Order of Merit of the Kingdom of Hungary Commander's Cross on war ribbon with swords (18. June 1941)
2nd row	Order of Merit of the Kingdom of Hungary Commander's Cross on war ribbon (1938)	Military Merit Cross 3rd Class with war decoration and swords	Military Merit Cross 3rd Class with war decoration and swords	Silver Military Merit Medal on war ribbon with swords
3rd row	Bronze Military Merit Medal on war ribbon with swords	Hungarian Bronze Military Merit Medal (1. March 1930)	Karl Troop Cross	Wound Medal (Austria-Hungary)
4th row	Hungarian World War I Commemorative Medal	Long Service Crosses for Officers 2nd class	Transylvania Commemorative Medal	Mobilization Cross 1912/13
5th row	Order of the Lion of Finland Commander, First Class (6. September 1944)	Order Of Merit First Republic of Austria Commander's Cross, 1st class (1937)	Iron Cross 1st Class	Iron Cross 2nd Class
6th row	War Commemorative Medal (Austria)			
Badge	Badge of the Order of Vitéz			

== Works ==
- Magyarország honvédelme a 2. világháború előtt és alatt, I-III., München, 1972.

Military offices
Preceded by Lieutenant-General Géza Lakatos	Commander of the Hungarian Second Army; 1 April 1944 – 16 October 1944	Succeeded by Lieutenant-General Jenő Major
