= Jenő Major =

Hungarian military officer

- Born: 6 August 1891; Baksa, Kingdom of Hungary
- Died: 13 January 1972 (aged 80); Sonthofen, West Germany
- Military career
- Allegiance: Austria-Hungary (to 1918); Hungary
- Branch: Austro-Hungarian Army; Royal Hungarian Army
- Service years: 1912–1945
- Rank: Vezérezredes (Colonel General)
- Commands: Hungarian Second Army
- Conflicts: World War I World War II

Jenő Major (born Jenő Majer; 6 August 1891 – 13 January 1972) was a Hungarian military officer, who served as the last Commander of the Hungarian Second Army during the Second World War.

He attended the Ludovica Academy, he was commissioned as an infantry lieutenant in 1912. He took part in World War I. He graduated from the military academy between 1923, then served in various staff positions, and until 1938 was a teacher of military history at Ludovica Academy. Between 1938 and 1940, he was department head at the Ministry of Defense and was promoted to Major general. Between 1941–1944 he was the commander of the 1st Armored Division, in 1943 he was appointed Lieutenant general.

From the Arrow Parties takeover, he became the commander of the 2nd Army, as Colonel general. After the destruction of his Army, he became Inspector-General of the Hungarian Army in Germany from 1 December 1944. He avoided extradition to Hungary and lived the remainder of his life in West Germany.

== Awards and decorations ==

1st row	Order of Merit of the Kingdom of Hungary Commander's Cross with Star on war ribbon with swords	Order of Merit of the Kingdom of Hungary Commander's Cross on civilian ribbon	Order of Merit of the Kingdom of Hungary Officer's Cross on civilian ribbon	Order of the Iron Crown (Austria) 3rd Class with war decoration and swords
2nd row	Military Merit Cross 3rd Class with war decoration and swords	Silver Military Merit Medal on war ribbon with swords	Bronze Military Merit Medal on war ribbon with swords	Hungarian Bronze Military Merit Medal on war ribbon
3rd row	Karl Troop Cross	Wound Medal (Austria-Hungary)	Hungarian World War I Commemorative Medal	Long Service Crosses for Officers 2nd class
4th row	Transylvania Commemorative Medal	Lower Hungary Commemorative Medal	Mobilization Cross 1912/13	Order of the Crown of Italy Officer's Cross
5th row	Grand Cross of the Order "For Military Merit" on war decoration			
Badge	Knight's Cross of the Iron Cross			
Badge	Badge of the Order of Vitéz			

== Works ==
- Emléktöredékek - Visszaemlékezés az 1944. március és 1945. július közötti háborús eseményekre, Petit Real, Budapest, 2000.

Military offices
Preceded by Lieutenant-General Lajos Veress	Commander of the Hungarian Second Army; 16 October 1944 – 13 November 1944	Succeeded by army destroyed
