= 8th Army (Wehrmacht) =

- German: 8. Armee
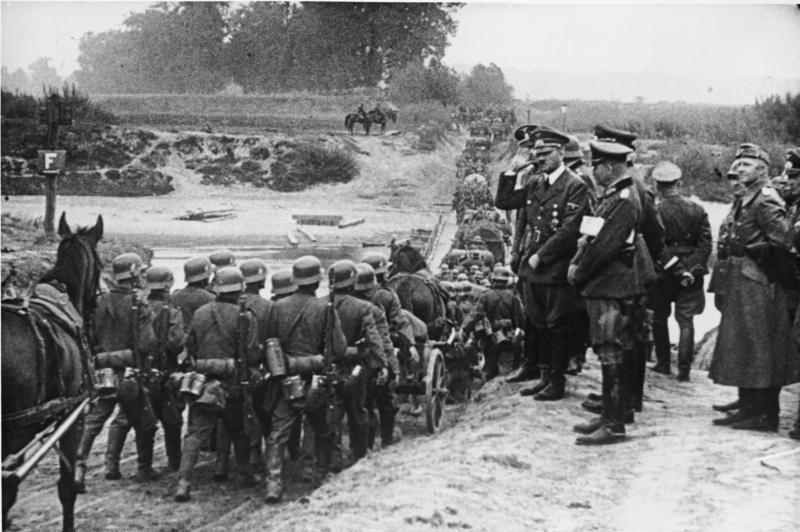
- Hitler and his generals watching 8th army parading in the Poland campaign
- Active: 1939; 1943-1945
- Country: Nazi Germany
- Branch: German army ( Wehrmacht)
- Type: Field army
- Size: 30 August 1943 (start of the Battle of the Dnieper): 159,598; 7 April 1944 (Dnieper-Carpathian Offensive): 230,000
- Engagements: World War II: Polish Campaign; Belgorod-Kharkov offensive; Battle of the Dnieper; Dnieper-Carpathian offensive; Kirovograd offensive; Korsun-Cherkassy Pocket; Uman-Botoșani offensive; First Jassy-Kishinev offensive; Second Jassy-Kishinev offensive; Battle of Debrecen

The 8th Army (German: 8. Armee) was a World War II field army. It existed twice during the war, in the invasion of Poland in 1939, and on the Eastern Front from 1943 onwards.

The 8th Army was activated on 1 August 1939 with General Johannes Blaskowitz in command. In 1939 it was part of Gerd von Rundstedt's Army Group South for the Invasion of Poland. It consisted of two corps, X. Armeekorps and XIII. Armeekorps, and was responsible for the northern part of Army Group South's front. The army saw heavy combat during the Battle of the Bzura. After the conclusion of the Polish campaign, it was reorganized into the 2nd Army which took part in the Battle of France in 1940.

In 1943 it was reformed after the Battle of Kursk from Army Detachment Kempf. After fierce defensive battles throughout 1943, 1944 and the first months of 1945, it finally surrendered in Austria in 1945. It fought in Hungary, Romania, and Austria in 1944 and 1945.

== Commanders ==
No.	Portrait	Commander	Took office	Left office	Time in office
1	Johannes Blaskowitz	Generaloberst; Johannes Blaskowitz (1883–1948)	1 August 1939	20 October 1939	80 days
2	Otto Wöhler	General der Infanterie; Otto Wöhler (1894–1987)	22 August 1943	7 December 1944	1 year, 107 days
3	Hans Kreysing	General der Gebirgstruppe; Hans Kreysing (1890–1969)	28 December 1944	8 May 1945	131 days
