= Axis order of battle at the Battle of Stalingrad =

Axis forces at Stalingrad, including German and Romanian divisions

The Axis order of battle at Stalingrad is a list of the significant land units that fought in the Battle of Stalingrad on the side of the Axis Powers between September 1942 and February 1943.

Apart from the twenty divisions of the German Wehrmacht, eighteen Romanian divisions took part in the battle on the Axis side as well.

== Order of battle ==
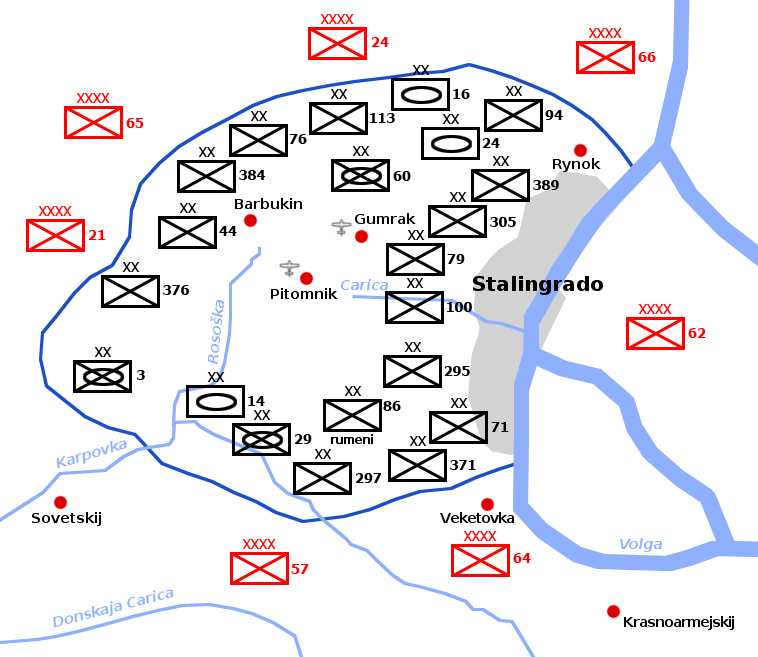
Map of the Stalingrad pocket, following Operation Uranus, showing all Axis divisions and major Soviet field armies

Generaloberst Friedrich Paulus, commanding the 6th Army
Chief of Staff: Generalmajor Arthur Schmidt

=== German ===
6th Army

- IV Army Corps – General der Pioniere Erwin Jaenecke, from 17 January General der Artillerie Max Pfeffer
  - 29th Motorized Infantry Division – Generalmajor Hans-Georg Leyser
  - 297th Infantry Division – General der Artillerie Max Pfeffer, from 16 January Generalmajor Moritz von Drebber
  - 371st Infantry Division – Generalleutnant Richard Stempel (KIA)
- VIII Army Corps – General der Artillerie Walter Heitz (promoted January 1943 to Generaloberst)
  - 76th Infantry Division – Generalleutnant Carl Rodenburg
  - 113th Infantry Division – Generalleutnant Hans-Heinrich Sixt von Armin
- XI Army Corps – General der Infanterie Karl Strecker
  - 44th Infantry Division – Generalleutnant Heinrich-Anton Deboi
  - 376th Infantry Division – Generalleutnant Alexander Edler von Daniels
  - 384th Infantry Division – Generalleutnant Eccard Freiherr von Gablenz, from 16 January Generalmajor Hans Dörr
- XIV Panzer Corps – General der Panzertruppe Hans-Valentin Hube, from 17 January Generalleutnant Helmuth Schlömer
  - 3rd Motorized Infantry Division – Generalmajor Helmuth Schlömer, from 18 January Oberst Jobst Freiherr von Hanstein
  - 60th Motorized Infantry Division – Generalmajor Hans-Adolf von Arenstorff
  - 16th Panzer Division – Generalleutnant Günther Angern
- LI Army Corps – General der Artillerie Walther von Seydlitz-Kurzbach
  - 71st Infantry Division – Generalleutnant Alexander von Hartmann, from 25 January Generalmajor Fritz Roske
  - 79th Infantry Division – Generalleutnant Richard Graf von Schwerin
  - 94th Infantry Division – Generalleutnant Georg Pfeiffer
  - 100th Jäger Division – Generalleutnant Werner Sanne
  - 295th Infantry Division – Generalmajor Otto Korfes
  - 305th Infantry Division – Generalleutnant Bernhard Steinmetz
  - 389th Infantry Division – Generalmajor Erich Magnus, from 19 January Generalmajor Martin Lattmann
  - 14th Panzer Division – Generalmajor Martin Lattmann
  - 24th Panzer Division – Generalleutnant Arno von Lenski
- Luftwaffe
  - 9th Flak Division – Generalmajor Wolfgang Pickert
  - Jagdgeschwader 3 – Wolf-Dietrich Wilcke

4th Panzer Army

- XXXXVIII Panzer Corps – General der Panzertruppe Rudolf Veiel until November 1942, followed by many other commanders
  - 14th Panzer Division, transferred to the 6th Army
  - 29th Motorized Infantry Division, transferred to the 6th Army
  - 24th Panzer Division, transferred to the 6th Army
- IV Army Corps - General der Infanterie Viktor von Schwedler
  - 94th Infantry Division, transferred to the 6th Army
  - 371st Infantry Division, transferred to the 6th Army
  - 297th Infantry Division, transferred to the 6th Army
- Romanian 6th Corps - Lieutenant General Corneliu Dragalina, transferred to the Romanian 4th Army

=== Romanian ===
Army Group Antonescu

- Third Army – General Petre Dumitrescu
  - 1st Corps – Lieutenant General Teodor Ionescu
    - 7th Infantry Division – Brigadier General Constantin Trestioreanu
    - 11th Infantry Division – Brigadier General Savu Nedelea (POW)
  - 2nd Corps – Lieutenant General Nicolae Dăscălescu
    - 9th Infantry Division – Major General Constantin Panaitiu
    - 14th Infantry Division – Major General Gheorghe Stavrescu
    - 7th Cavalry Division – Colonel Gheorghe Munteanu
  - 4th Corps – Lieutenant General Constantin Sănătescu
    - 1st Cavalry Division – Colonel Constantin Brătescu
    - 13th Infantry Division – Major General Gheorghe Ionescu
    - 15th Infantry Division – Brigadier General Ioan Sion (KIA)
  - 5th Corps – Lieutenant General Aurelian Son
    - 5th Infantry Division – Major General Nicolae Mazarini (POW)
    - 6th Infantry Division – Major General Mihail Lascăr (POW)
  - In reserve
    - 1st Armoured Division – Major General Gheorghe Radu
    - Various artillery regiments
- Fourth Army – Lieutenant General Constantin Constantinescu-Claps
  - 6th Corps – Lieutenant General Corneliu Dragalina
    - 1st Infantry Division – Brigadier General Ioan Mihăescu
    - 2nd Infantry Division – Brigadier General Dumitru Tudose
    - 18th Infantry Division – Brigadier General Radu Băldescu
    - 20th Infantry Division – Major General Nicolae Tătăranu until 19 January 1943, then Brigadier General Romulus Dimitriu (POW)
  - 7th Corps – Lieutenant General Florea Mitrănescu
    - 4th Infantry Division – Brigadier General Barbu Alinescu
    - 5th Cavalry Division – Colonel Dumitru Popescu
    - 8th Cavalry Division – Colonel Radu Korne

== See also ==
- Romanian armies in the Battle of Stalingrad
