= Corneliu Dragalina =

Romanian general

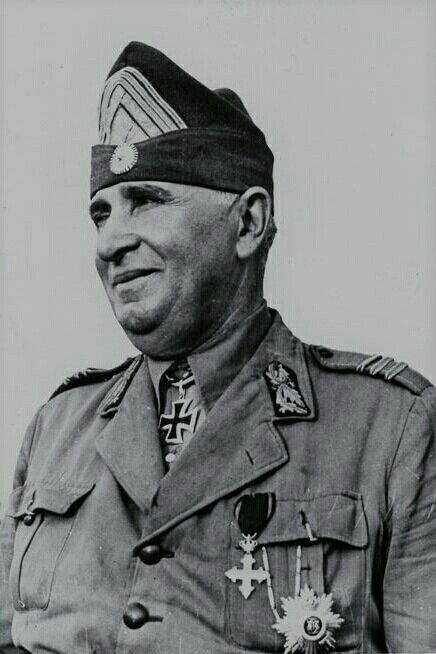
- Lt. Gen. Dragalina near Kharkov, 1942
- Born: 5 February 1887; Karánsebes, Austria-Hungary (now Caransebeș, Romania)
- Died: 11 July 1949 (aged 62); Bucharest, People's Republic of Romania
- Burial place: Bellu Cemetery, Bucharest
- Education: Higher War School
- Relatives: Ion Dragalina (father)
- Military career
- Allegiance: Romania
- Branch: Land Forces
- Service years: 1907–45
- Rank: Lieutenant General
- Commands: 6th Army Corps
- Conflicts: World War I; World War II; Eastern Front; Second Battle of Kharkov; Battle of Stalingrad
- Awards: Order of Michael the Brave; Iron Cross; Knight's Cross of the Iron Cross

Prefect of Timiș-Torontal County
- In office April 1920 – February 1921
- Prime Minister: Alexandru Averescu
- Preceded by: Aurel Cosma
- Succeeded by: Nicolae Imbroane

Governor-General of Bukovina Governorate
- In office 21 March 1943 – 23 March 1944
- Prime Minister: Ion Antonescu
- Preceded by: Corneliu Calotescu
- Succeeded by: Position abolished

Corneliu Dragalina (5 February 1887 – 11 July 1949) was a Romanian lieutenant general during World War II.

== Biography ==
=== Early life and World War I ===
He was born in the city of Karánsebes, Austria-Hungary, in what is now Caransebeș, Caraș-Severin County, Romania. His father, Ion Dragalina, was a general in World War I.

After attending the Artillery Military School in Bucharest (1905–1907), Corneliu Dragalina graduated with the rank of second lieutenant; he was promoted to lieutenant in 1910 and to captain in 1915. When Romania entered World War I in August 1916 on the side of the Allied powers, Dragalina fought with the Dobruja Army under the command of Russian General Andrei Zayonchkovski, and saw action against the Bulgarian forces. Wounded in battle, he was taken by barge on the Danube to a hospital in Galați, where he was operated upon. Shortly after that he went back to Bucharest to take leave of his father, who, at the command of the 1st Romanian Army, had been mortally wounded at the First Battle of the Jiu Valley. For his valor, Dragalina was decorated in November 1916 with the Order of Michael the Brave, 3rd class. In 1917 he was promoted to major.

=== The interwar period ===
After the war, he pursued his military studies at the Higher War School (1919–1921). During that time (April 1920–February 1921), he also served (via a delegate) as prefect of Timiș-Torontal County. Dragalina was promoted to lieutenant colonel in 1920, colonel in 1928, and brigadier general in 1935. On 1 January 1940 he was named commander of the 6th Army Corps, stationed in Cluj, while on 6 June 1940 he was promoted to major general. In the aftermath of the Second Vienna Award (signed on 30 August 1940), Dragalina took a leading role in the evacuation of the Romanian troops from Northern Transylvania, and moved his headquarters to Brașov. During the Legionnaires' rebellion of January 1941, Dragalina with his troops restored order inside the city and secured the radio broadcast station at Bod. As a prelude to the invasion of Yugoslavia by the Axis powers in the spring of 1941, the 6th Army Corps was relocated to the Banat, but eventually the Serbian Banat was occupied by German troops.

=== World War II ===
General Dragalina was still in command of the 6th Army Corps when Romania joined Operation Barbarossa on 22 June 1941 in order to reclaim the lost territories of Bessarabia and Bukovina, which had been annexed by the Soviet Union in June 1940. The 6th Corps was kept in reserve inside Romania and was sent to the Eastern Front only in October 1941, when it took part in the final phase of the Siege of Odessa. It then took part in the Crimean campaign, after which the 6th Corps moved in the spring of 1942 to the south of Izium, where it took under its command four Romanian infantry divisions (the 1st, 2nd, 4th, and 20th). In May 1942, Dragalina led his troops during the Second Battle of Kharkov. The 6th Corps lost 2,983 men during the battle, but took 26,432 Soviet POWs, and also captured a large number of T-60 light tanks, as well as the first T-34 and KV-1 tanks taken intact by the Romanian Army. For the 1942 German summer offensive, Dragalina was subordinated to the 1st Panzer Army. On 22 June, the 6th Corps forced the Donets River and continued the offensive towards the Don River, advancing 450 km in 20 days. On 18 July Dragalina was promoted to lieutenant general, after which he was subordinated to the 4th Panzer Army, helping it advance across the Don River.

At the beginning of September, the 6th Corps (consisting by then of the 1st, 2nd, 4th, and 18th Infantry Divisions) was assigned to the Romanian Fourth Army, commanded by General Constantin Constantinescu-Claps. The 4th Army had joined in the Battle of Stalingrad, helping to protect the southern flank of the German 6th Army as it tried to conquer the city of Stalingrad, defended by the Red Army. On 20 November 1942, the 4th Army was attacked by the Soviet 57th and 51st Armies, with the main blow in the sector of the 20th, 2nd, 18th and 1st Infantry Divisions. Overpowered and poorly equipped, Dragalina's 6th Corps troops received the brunt of the Soviet offensive (Operation Uranus) south of Stalingrad. On 23 November, the Deputy Chief of Staff of the Fourth Army demanded and received from the Romanian General Headquarters the authorization to make decisions independently from the 4th Panzer Army. Subsequently, the 6th Corps fell back to the Aksay River, but to no avail, as the Soviets were already in control of the communication center of Aksay. On 27 November, the Soviets managed to break through the line of the 6th Corps at the 18th Infantry Division, thus forcing it to retreat 25–30 km south of the river. The remnants of the 6th Corps tried to defend a line of villages backed up by Radu Korne's detachment, but the Soviets had an almost free hand as the Romanian forces disintegrated. The losses of the 6th Corps in this operation were catastrophic, with up to 80% in personnel at the 1st, 2nd, and 18th divisions.

On 16 December 1942, Dragalina was recalled from the Eastern Front by Marshal Ion Antonescu. After relinquishing command of the 6th Army Corps on 20 March 1943, he served as Governor-General of the Bukovina Governorate from 21 March 1943 until 23 March 1944, when the Red Army occupied Bukovina during the Uman–Botoșani Offensive. According to the book History of the Jews in the Bukowina/Geschichte der Juden in der Bukowina, edited by Hugo Gold, published in Tel Aviv in two volumes in 1958 - 1962, Corneliu as governor "Dragalina was open to reason and did not permit open brutality against the Jews". He was then put at the disposal of the Ministry of Defense. He returned as General Inspector of the Mechanized Troops between November 1944 and March 1945, when he was definitively retired by order of the Petru Groza government.

=== After the war ===
Dragalina later lost his house in Timișoara and was harassed by the Securitate, but, unlike many other military commanders who had fought on the Eastern Front, he was not arrested. He died from natural causes on 11 July 1949 in Bucharest, escaping persecution by the new Communist regime. He is buried at Bellu Military Cemetery in Bucharest.

== Awards ==
- Order of Michael the Brave
  - 3rd Class (11 November 1916)
  - 2nd Class (1 September 1942)
- Iron Cross (1939) 2nd and 1st Class
- Knight's Cross of the Iron Cross (9 August 1942)

== Legacy ==
The National Military Museum in Bucharest houses a permanent exhibition that displays personal objects which belonged to top Romanian military leaders, including memorabilia of Corneliu Dragalina.

== See also ==
- Romania during World War II
- Battle of Stalingrad German Order of Battle
- Operation Uranus
- Romanian armies in the Battle of Stalingrad
