= Romanian armies in the Battle of Stalingrad =

Battle of Stalingrad from Romania side
- Part of Battle of Stalingrad
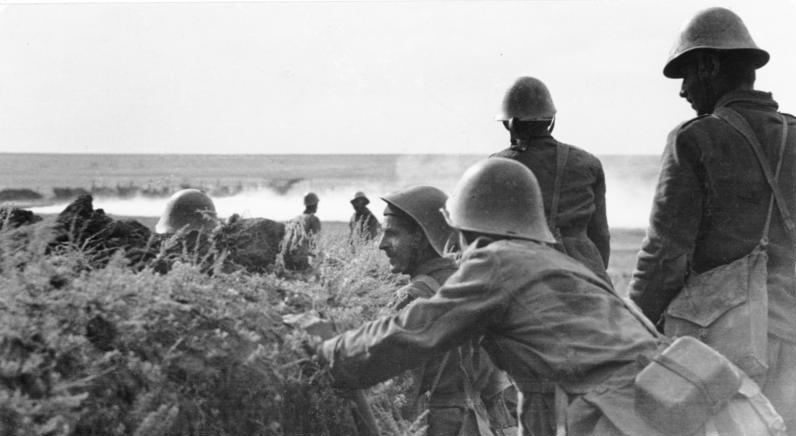
- Romanian troops in the Don-Stalingrad area, 1942
Date	19 November 1942 – 2 February 1943
Location	Stalingrad, USSR
Result	Soviet victory

Belligerents
Romania; Germany; Hungary; Italy; Croatia	Soviet Union

Commanders and leaders
(Kingdom of Romania) Petre Dumitrescu (Kingdom of Romania) Constantin Constantinescu-Claps	(Soviet Union) Georgy Zhukov

Units involved
North: (Kingdom of Romania) 3rd Army; South: (Kingdom of Romania) 4th Army	North: (Soviet Union) 1st Guards Army (Soviet Union) 5th Tank Army (Soviet Union) 21st Army (Soviet Union) 65th Army (Soviet Union) 3rd Guards Army; South: (Soviet Union) 51st Army (Soviet Union) 57th Army

Strength
North: 171,256 men 140 tanks South: 75,380 men	448,631+ men 10,819 artillery pieces 1,183 tanks 790 aircraft

Casualties and losses
158,854 casualties 100 tanks	Heavy; 127+ tanks

Two Romanian armies, the Third and the Fourth, were involved in the Battle of Stalingrad, helping to protect the northern and southern flanks respectively, of the German 6th Army as it tried to conquer the city of Stalingrad defended by the Red Army in mid to late 1942. Underpowered and poorly equipped, these forces were unable to stop the Soviet November offensive (Operation Uranus), which punched through both flanks and left the German 6th Army encircled in Stalingrad. The Romanians suffered enormous losses, which effectively ended their offensive capability on the Eastern Front for the remainder of the war.

== Background ==
Following the Molotov–Ribbentrop Pact in August 1939, Romania lost almost one third of its territory without a single shot being fired, as Bessarabia and Northern Bukovina were annexed by the Soviet Union on June 28, 1940, after Romania yielded to a Soviet ultimatum. As a result, King Carol II was forced to abdicate in September 1940, and General Ion Antonescu rose to power.

In October, Romania joined the Axis and expressed its availability for a military campaign against the Soviet Union, in order to recapture the provinces ceded in June. After a highly successful summer campaign in 1941 as part of Army Group South, the Romanian Armed Forces regained the territory between the Prut and Dniestr rivers. General Antonescu decided to continue to advance alongside the Wehrmacht, disregarding the Romanian High Command's doubts over the possibility of sustaining a mobile warfare campaign deep inside Soviet territory.

In October 1941, the Romanian Fourth Army occupied Odessa after a protracted siege which caused more than 80,000 casualties on the Romanian side, and severe destruction and many casualties among the civilian population (the Odessa massacre). The spring and summer of 1942 saw the Third and Fourth Romanian Armies in action in the Battle of Crimea and the Battle of the Caucasus. By the fall of 1942, the two armies were poised to join the attack on Stalingrad.

== Prelude ==
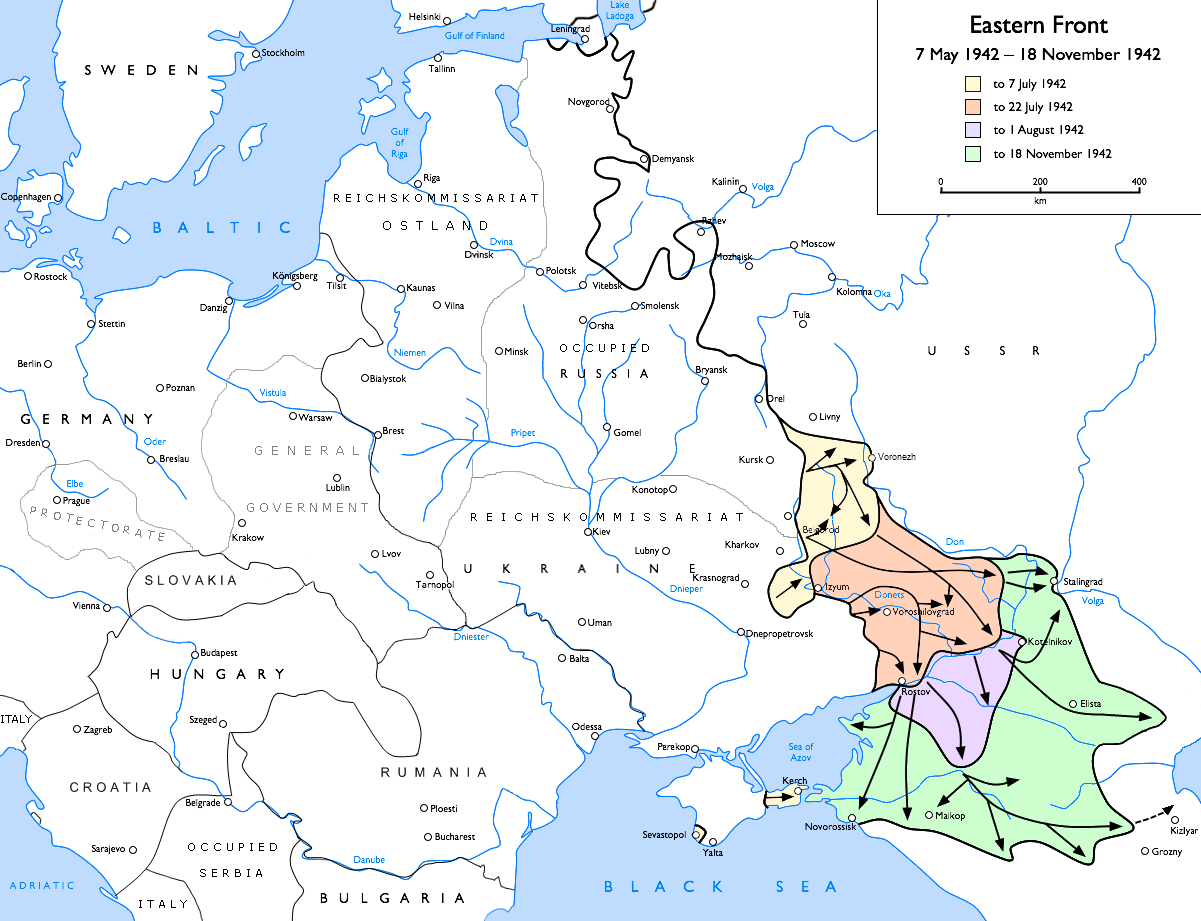
German advance on the Eastern Front from 7 May to 18 November 1942.

In September 1942, the Romanian Third and Fourth Armies took up their positions around Stalingrad together with the first elements of the Romanian Air Corps: on September 16, the 7th Fighter Group, on September 25, the 5th Bomber Group and, on October 4, the 1st Bomber, 8th Fighter, 6th Fighter-Bomber and 3rd Bomber Group arrived with the mission of providing air support for the Third Romanian and 6th German Armies.

The Romanian Third Army, commanded by General Petre Dumitrescu, was transferred from the Caucasus and replaced five Italian and two German divisions between Blizh Perekopka and Bokovkaya, with the task of defending a front 138 km long, far beyond its capabilities. To make things worse, the Soviets had two bridgeheads over the Don River, at Serafimovich and Kletskaya, which the German High Command ignored, despite repeated requests by General Dumitrescu for permission to eliminate them.

At the start of the Soviet offensive in November 1942, the Third Army had a nominal strength of 152,492 Romanian troops and 11,211 German troops, composed of 1st, 2nd, 4th and 5th Army Corps in a single echelon (1st Cavalry, 5th, 6th, 7th, 9th, 11th, 13th and 14th Infantry Divisions) from West to East, with 7th Cavalry and 15th Infantry Divisions in reserve. The Long Range Recon (DO-17M) and the 112th Liaison Squadrons (Fleet 10G) were also at its disposal. In November came the German XLVIII Panzer Corps, composed of the 22nd Panzer Division and the 1st Armoured Division (Romania), which was also placed in reserve. It also had the 2nd, 4th, 5th and 8th Motorized Heavy Artillery Regiments and the 41st Independent Motorized Heavy Artillery Battalion. Opposite the 3rd Army was the Southwestern Front (Soviet 1st Guards Army, 5th Tank Army and 21st Army), with a staggering force of 5,888 artillery pieces, 728 tanks and 790 planes.

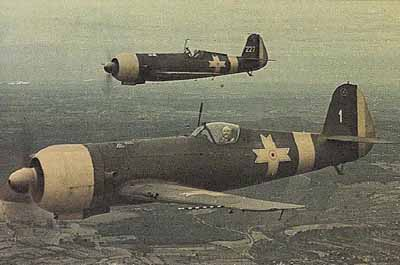
IAR 80 fighter planes.

The Romanian Fourth Army, commanded by General Constantin Constantinescu-Claps, with 75,580 men, occupied a line south of the city, between Staraya Otrada and Sarpa. It comprised the 6th and 7th Army Corps (1st, 2nd, 4th, 18th, 20th Infantry Divisions and the 5th and 8th Cavalry Divisions). The Romanian Air Corps put at its disposal the 15th, 16th, 17th Observation (IAR 39) and the 114th Liaison Squadrons (Fleet 10G) covering a front of 270 km (170 mi) long. Thus the 18th Cavalry covered a line of 100 km (62 mi). The reserve consisted of the 6th Roșiori Regiment, the 27th, 57th Pioneer Battalions and the 57th Recon Group. Also, the Fourth Panzer Army had in the area the 29th Motorized Infantry Division. This army was supposed to check the advance of the Stalingrad Front (Soviet 51st, 62nd, 63rd and 57th Armies), which possessed 4,931 artillery pieces and 455 tanks.

Most of these formations were in deplorable shape, with at best 73% of necessary manpower, with the 1st Infantry Division going as low as 25% and an almost nonexistent arsenal of heavy antitank guns. Between these two armies was the Sixth German Army, under General der Panzertruppe Friedrich Paulus.

== The battle ==
=== In the north ===
On 19 November at 05:30, in the sector of the Third Romanian Army, artillery barrages battered the entire front line, while blizzards, snow fall, and −20 °C (−4 °F) made close air support impossible. The Soviets assaulted the positions of the 14th Infantry Division with the 5th Tank Army and the junction between the 13th Infantry Division and the 1st Cavalry Division with the 21st Army, with a total of 338,631 men against three weak divisions. The 37mm and 47mm AT guns were useless against Soviet tanks, so the Romanian troops had to use grenades, anti-tank mines, and Molotov cocktails. In the first hours, they managed to delay the advance and destroy some armor, but later they had to retreat or be encircled. The Soviets also attacked west of the Tsaritsa River and at Raspopinskaya, but were repulsed.

In response to the situation that developed south of Kletskaya, the 48th Armored Corps was ordered to move towards the Soviet main thrust and shortly afterwards, the 22nd Panzer Division was redirected to the northwest towards Bolsoy and, reaching Petshany, it engaged Soviet armor. By evening, the 1st Romanian Armored Division reached Sirkovsky, making preparations to attack Bolsoy the next day. In the first day of the offensive, the Soviet forces succeeded in making two breaches in the defences of the Third Romanian Army: one in the center, 16–18 km wide and 15 km deep and one in the right wing, between the Third Romanian Army and the 6th German Army, 10–12 km wide and 35–40 km deep.

Soviet advance at Stalingrad from November 19 to November 28, 1942.

On 20 November, the Soviet armored and motorized forces advanced towards Kalach, with the intention of encircling the 6th German Army fighting at Stalingrad. The 22nd Panzer Division, overwhelmed at Petshany by the large number of Soviet tanks, withdrew north to Bol. Donschynka. The 1st Romanian Armored Division, without any available radio contact, tried to advance to Petshany in order to make the junction with the 22nd Panzer Division, but was forced to stop a few kilometers west of Korotovsky by stiff Soviet resistance and numerous counterattacks by Soviet tanks, flowing between the German 22nd and the Romanian 1st, occupying the Varlamovsky and Peralasovsky villages and making the junction with forces coming from Gromsky, thus encircling the 5th Corps.

In the 4th Corps' sector, 40 Soviet tanks attacked the 15th Infantry Division but were repulsed by evening with heavy losses. Meanwhile, the 7th Cavalry Division unsuccessfully tried to block the enemy's advance; the right wing of the division, which had fully received the blow, retreated south while the left wing was reassigned to the 9th Infantry Division. Also, the 1st Cavalry Division had to retreat towards Stalingrad and was subordinated to the 6th Army.

At the end of the day, the defence position of the Third Romanian Army had a 70 km (43 mi) wide gap in the centre. In this pocket were encircled the 1st Armored Division, three infantry divisions (5th, 6th, and 15th) and remnants of two other infantry divisions (13th and 14th). The former commander of the 6th Infantry Division, Major General Mihail Lascăr, took command of the troops from the infantry divisions and formed the "General Lascăr" Group (40,000 men). At this point, the command point of the Third Army began moving to Morozovskaya.

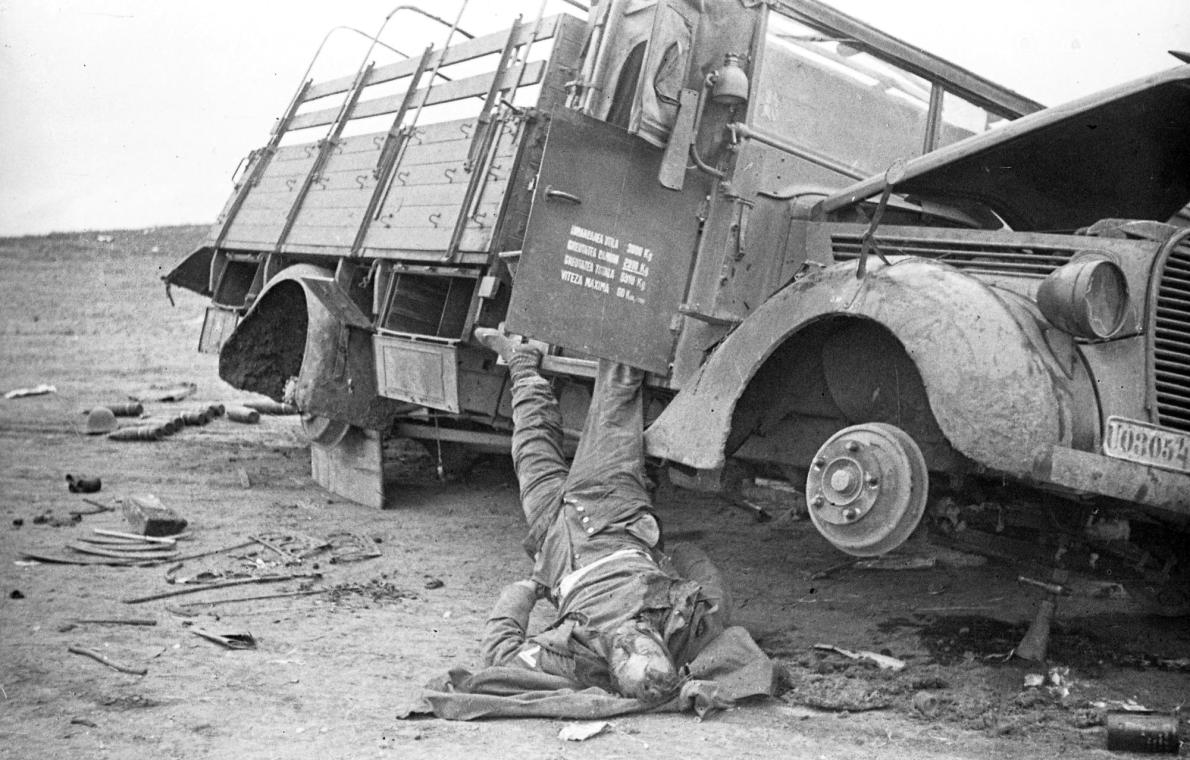
A dead Romanian soldier by a wrecked truck, December 1942.

On 21 November, the 22nd Panzer Division tried to advance towards Perelasovsky in order to make the junction with the 1st Armored Division and to relieve the "General Lascār" Group, but failed and was stopped the next day between Bol. Donschynka and Perelasovsky. The 1st Romanian Armored Division advanced towards Bol. Donschynka, where it was hoping to find the German division, but the village was under Soviet control and then headed south and, after grim fighting, crossed the Chir River on 25 November.

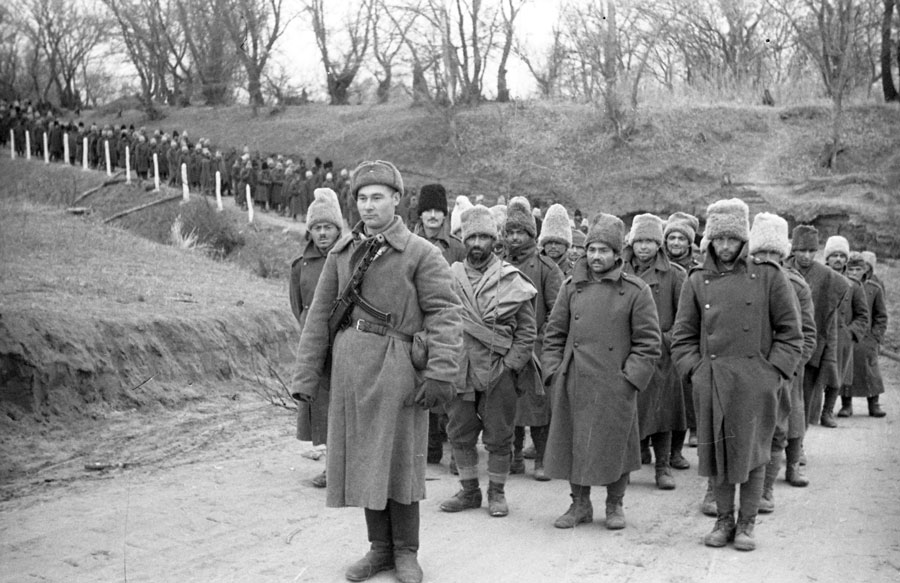
A column of Romanian prisoners of war being escorted to the rear during the Battle of Stalingrad, November 1942.

On 22 November, the encircled "General Lascār" Group, which had been ordered to resist at any cost, was attacked and transmitted its last message. They had run out of food and each gun had only 40 rounds left. After refusing the Soviet proposal to surrender they were entirely destroyed. Only the 1st Battalion of the 15 Infantry Regiment (6th Infantry Division), commanded by Major Gheorghe Răscănescu, succeeded in getting to the river Chir with all its soldiers and equipment. His battalion had managed to prevent the Soviet 8th Cavalry Division from capturing the vital German airfield at Oblivskaya from 26 November to 3 December.

On 23 November, the Soviet troops of the South-Western Front and of the Stalingrad Front met at Kalach-na-Donu, completing the encirclement of the German 6th Army, parts of the Fourth Army and six other Romanian infantry divisions and one cavalry division.

=== In the south ===
On 20 November, the Romanian Fourth Army was attacked by the Soviet 57th and 51st Armies, with the main blow in the sector of the 20th, 2nd, 18th and 1st Infantry Divisions. The 57th Army attacked towards Sovetsky in the northeast and the 51st Army towards Kotelnikovo in the south. The front was broken at the junction of the 2nd and 20th Infantry Divisions and at the junction of the 1st and 18th Infantry Divisions. The Soviets advanced fast into the breaches created by the first wave, pushing the 13th Tank Corps towards Saty, the Soviet 4th Mechanized Corps towards Plodovitoye and, later, the 4th Cavalry Corps towards Abganerovo. By evening, the 1st and 2nd Infantry Divisions were virtually destroyed and the 18th Infantry Division was in danger of encirclement.

Also, the link with the 20th Infantry Division was broken. Despite the stubborn resistance put up by the 91st Infantry Regiment and the 20th Pioneer Battalion, the Soviets broke through Tundutovo and Ivanovka, getting behind the division and, within an hour, most of the Romanian soldiers were either dead or captured.

On 21 November, the 57th Army advanced towards Sovetsky (17 km southeast of Kalach) to meet the forces of the South Western Front and encircle the German forces at Stalingrad, while the 51st Army advanced towards Kotelnikovo, along the Kotelnikovo-Stalingrad railroad. The 6th Corps tried to resist, while the "Korne" Detachment (3rd, 4th Cavalry Regiments, 2nd Artillery Battalion and the 7th Heavy Artillery Regiment), led by General Radu Korne and backed by German armored units, launched a counterattack towards Abganerovo, with the 29th German Motorized Infantry Division attacking from the northwest. The action failed due to lack of effective anti-tank weapons.

On 22 November, the Soviets took hold of Mal. Derbety and Tundutovo and the "Korne" Detachment was attacked in the Krasnay-Geroy area, suffering heavy losses. The proposal by the Romanian command to fall back to better positions on the Aksay River clashed with the German decision to hold firm.

On 23 November, the Deputy Chief of Staff of the Fourth Army demanded and received from the Romanian General Headquarters the authorization to make decisions independently from the 4th Panzer Army. Subsequently, the 6th Corps fell back to the Aksay River, but to no avail, as the Soviets were already in control of the communication center of Aksay. The "Korne" Detachment fell back, leaving the flank of the 7th Corps uncovered. At the same time, the 5th Cavalry and the 4th Infantry Divisions were attacked from the east. In order to prevent the Soviet advance between the railroad and the river Don, a new defence line, with its center at Kotelnikovo, was established. In the afternoon, the Soviet troops of the Stalingrad Front met the South-Western Front troops in Sovetsky area, encircling the German forces at Stalingrad. Receiving information about the arrival of a German detachment, the Fourth Romanian Army's commander decided to hold its position. The 6th Corps was on the southern bank of the Aksay River, the 4th Infantry Division from Umansevo to Kotsubayev and the 5th Cavalry Division further to Perednaya Elista with the link between the two corps being provided by the "Korne" Detachment.

=== Tank battles ===
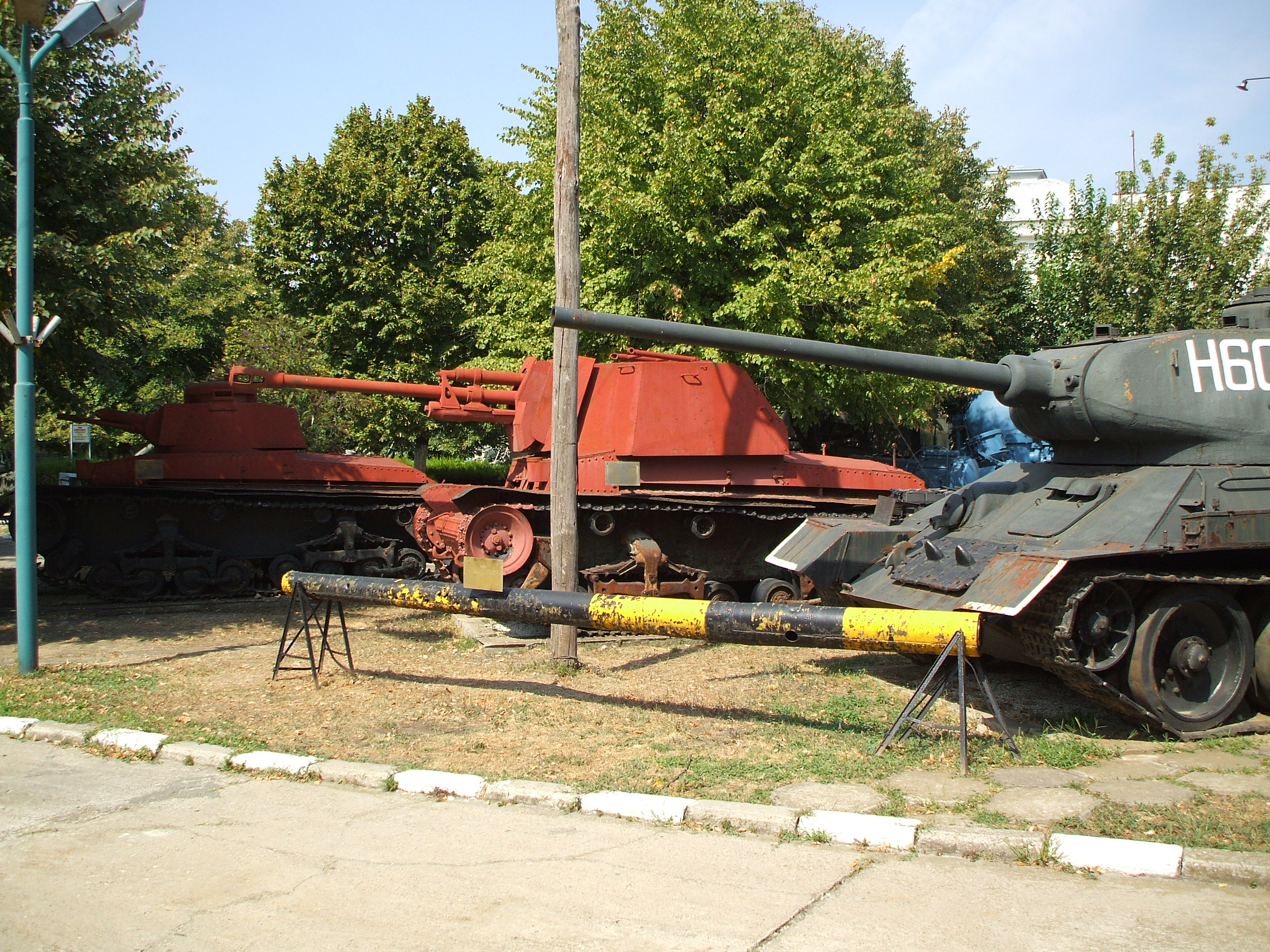
A Romanian R-2 light tank of the type fielded by the 1st Armoured Division at Stalingrad (far left) alongside a later TACAM R-2 tank destroyer (centre) and a T-34 (right) on display at the National Military Museum, Bucharest.

The 1st Romanian Armored Division consisted of 121 R-2 light tanks and 19 German-produced tanks (Panzer III and IV). On 20 November, near Serafimovich, the Romanian 1st Armored Division fought against the 19th Tank Brigade of the Soviet 26th Tank Corps. By the end of the day, the Romanians destroyed 62 Soviet tanks for the cost of 25 tanks of their own. Further fighting took place on 22 November, with the Romanians destroying 65 more Soviet tanks while losing 10 tanks.

By 1 January 1943, the 1st Romanian Armored Division was depleted of all its 19 German-made tanks and a further 27 R-2 light tanks were also lost in combat. Added to these were 54 R-2 tanks which were abandoned after breaking down or running out of fuel. Only 40 R-2 light tanks remained in the inventory of the Division when it withdrew from the combat zone at the start of 1943.

== The end ==
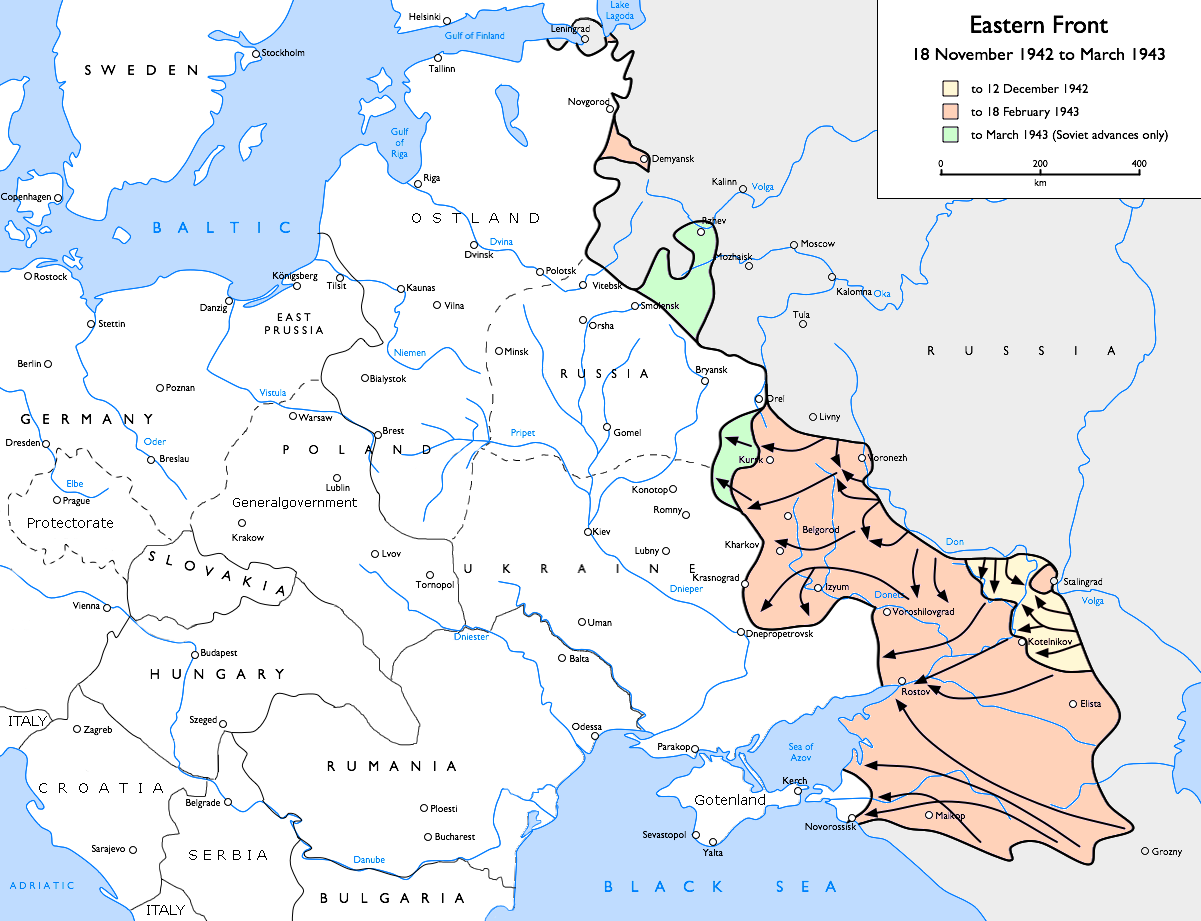
Soviet advances on the Eastern Front, November 18, 1942 to March 1943.

On 24 November, Soviet activity abated, but the next day, the Soviet troops attacked towards Kotelnikovo between the Don and the railroad, pushing the 4th Infantry Division southwards from the left flank of the 7th Corps.

On 26 November, the "Korne" and "Pannwitz" Detachments managed to push back the Soviet troops which had infiltrated between the two Romanian corps. On the 27th, the Soviets approaching Kotelnikovo were also repelled by counterattack of the "Pannwitz" Detachment and units of the 6th Panzer Division, which had recently arrived in preparation for the counter strike to relieve the Axis forces in Stalingrad. The Soviets managed to break through the line of the 6th Corps at the 18th Infantry Division, thus forcing it to retreat 25–30 km south of the river. The losses of the Fourth Romanian Army in this operation were catastrophic: up to 80% in personnel at the 1st, 2nd and 18th Infantry divisions.

On 16 December, the Soviet Third Guards Army started Operation Little Saturn and attacked Army Group Hollidt, which had subordinated the Third Romanian Army, along the river Chir. On 18 December, the Soviet Sixth Army broke through the defence of the Italian 8th Army and the 18th, 24th and 25th Tank Corps penetrated deep behind Axis lines, threatening the rear of the front on the Chir.

On 22 December, the banks of the river Chir were abandoned by the left wing of Army Group Hollidt as they retreated towards Morozovskaya. On 27 December, the 7th Cavalry Division started to retreat towards Bisry after 40 days of continuous fighting, but the following day, General Karl-Adolf Hollidt assigned the 11th Roșiori and 11th Călărași Regiments and the 61st Recon Group the task of defending the German depots at Chernigof. The Romanian cavalrymen held the town against Soviet attacks until 2 January 1943, when they eventually retreated. They were the last Axis troops to leave the Chir line.

To the south, the remains of the Fourth Army and the Romanian Air Corps were engaged in Operation Wintergewitter, which aimed to create a link with the Axis troops in Stalingrad. The main blow was to be delivered by the German 57th Panzer Corps; on its left flank was the Romanian 6th Corps with the Romanian 7th Corps and the Cavalry Group General Popescu forming the right flank. They were stopped 50 km from Stalingrad and, on 18 December, the front held by the 8th Italian Army was broken, with seven Italian divisions and the Italian Alpine Corps being encircled.

On 24 December, the Red Army counterattacked, with 149,000 men and 635 tanks, the German 57th Panzer Corps and the Romanian Fourth Army and on 29 December, the 57th Panzer had to abandon Kotelnikovo, which sealed the fate of the Axis troops in Stalingrad.

On 15 January 1943, came another devastating blow: The Hungarian 2nd Army was encircled and eventually destroyed, with 147,971 casualties.

== Aftermath ==
On 2 February 1943, the resistance of the Axis troops in Stalingrad ceased. Out of the 91,000 prisoners taken by the Soviets, 3,000 were Romanian. These were the survivors of the 20th Infantry Division, the 1st Cavalry Division, and the "Colonel Voicu" Detachment. The Romanian Army lost 158,854 men (dead, wounded and missing) between 19 November 1942 and 7 January 1943. This represented 16 of the 18 divisions engaged at Stalingrad and half of the army's active troops (31 divisions). The Romanian Air Corps lost 73 airplanes (26 in battle and the rest on the ground).

The Romanian armed forces were not capable of recovering after such catastrophic losses, and from this point onward, they would only fight desperate defensive battles on their way back to Romania.

== See also ==
- Axis order of battle at the Battle of Stalingrad
- Operation Uranus
- Romania during World War II
