= Ioan Sion =

Romanian general

- Born: Alecu Ioan Sion; 28 September 1890; Pitești, Kingdom of Romania
- Died: 24 November 1942 (aged 52); Bolshaya Doshchinka, Stalingrad Oblast, Soviet Union
- Education: Higher War School
- Military career
- Allegiance: Kingdom of Romania
- Branch: Army
- Service years: 1911–1942
- Rank: Major general
- Commands: 1st Armored Division; 15th Infantry Division
- Conflicts: World War I; World War II; Operation München; Siege of Odessa; Battle of Stalingrad †
- Awards: Order of the Crown (Romania), Knight class Order of Michael the Brave, 3rd class

Alecu Ioan Sion (September 28, 1890 – November 24, 1942) was a Romanian soldier and a major general in the Land Forces.

Born in Pitești, he attended the military high school from Iași and then studied at the military school for artillery and engineers officers in Bucharest from 1909 to 1911. He entered the army as a second lieutenant in 1911. Promoted to lieutenant in 1914, he later took part in World War I, commanding a unit within the 2nd Artillery Regiment. During the Romanian Campaign of 1916, he stood out at the battles of Perșani and Porumbacu, for which he was awarded the Order of the Crown of Romania, Knight class. He was promoted to captain in 1917, and fought in the battles in Moldavia during that summer.

After the war, Sion advanced in rank to major in January 1921, and then attended the Higher War School from November 1921 to October 1923. He became a lieutenant colonel in 1931 and a colonel in 1937. He commanded the center for artillery instruction between 1940 and 1941. On 10 May 1941 he was promoted to brigadier general and on 16 May he was appointed commanding officer of the 1st Armored Division. The division was equipped with some 200 armored vehicles, out of a total of 374 such vehicles in all of the Romanian Army. Of those, 75 were Renault FT.1917 light tanks (imported from France and Poland), organized in a battalion; 45 tanks in 3 platoons comprising a mechanized battalion; and 53 tanks attached to 4 cavalry divisions.

At the start of Operation Barbarossa, the division passed under the operational command of the XIth Corps Wehrmacht's 11th Army, led by General Eugen Ritter von Schobert. Romania joined Operation Barbarossa on 22 June in order to reclaim the lost territories of Bessarabia and Northern Bukovina, which had been annexed by the Soviet Union in June 1940. Sion crossed the Prut River with the 1st Armored Division during the night of July 2/3, at the start of Operation München. After an engagement with the Red Army at Brătușeni, his troops advanced towards the Dniester River, first in the direction of Mohyliv-Podilskyi, then towards Soroca and Bălți, and then playing a decisive role in the occupation of Chișinău on July 16. On 5 August the 1st Armored Division was put under the operational command of the Romanian 5th Corps. That night, the division crossed the Dniester, and then served as the lead unit of the Romanian 4th Army (under the command of General Nicolae Ciupercă) in its advance towards Odessa, reaching the outskirts of the city by August 14. After a disastrous attack on 18 August on the Karpova railway station (where the Soviets had dug in along the railbed embankments), Sion was relieved of his command by Marshal Ion Antonescu and replaced by General Carol Schmidt. He returned to the command of the 1st Armored Division on October 10, and kept the position until January 10, 1942, when General Radu Gherghe took over, with Sion as second in command.

On August 1, 1942, Sion was named commanding officer of the 15th Infantry Division. With it he moved to the front, near Stalingrad, being subordinated to the Romanian 3rd Army, led by General Petre Dumitrescu. Sion was killed on November 24, 1942 at Bolshaya Doshchinka, during the Battle of Stalingrad, when his 15th Infantry Division was overrun and wiped out during the Soviet Operation Uranus. He was the only Romanian division commander killed in action during World War II.

After his death, he was made a major general, retroactive to October 22, 1941, and was awarded the Order of Michael the Brave, 3rd class.
