= Barbu Alinescu =

- Born: January 20, 1890; Bucharest, Kingdom of Romania
- Died: November 30, 1952 (aged 62); Bucharest, Romanian People's Republic
- Education: Higher War School
- Military career
- Allegiance: Kingdom of Romania
- Branch: Army
- Rank: Major General
- Commands: 4th Infantry Division
- Conflicts: Second Balkan War; World War I World War II
- Awards: Order of the Crown, Commander class

Barbu Alinescu (20 January 1890 – 30 November 1952) was a major general of the Romanian Armed Forces during World War II.

He was born in Bucharest in 1890. After graduating from military school with the rank of second lieutenant, he participated in the Second Balkan War in 1913, and then promoted to lieutenant. At the start of World War I he fought at the Battle of Turtucaia in 1916, after which he was promoted to captain and then to major the next year. After the war, Alinescu pursued his studies at the Higher War School (1919–1921), after which he was promoted to lieutenant colonel in 1927, to colonel in 1934, and to brigadier general in 1939.

From 1940 to 1942 Alinescu was the director of the National Military Circle. In 1941, he became the Inspector of Engineers and that same year the Commanding Officer of the 1st Engineers Brigade. He was awarded the Order of the Crown, Commander class, on 9 May 1941.

After Romania entered World War II on the side of the Axis powers, he became General Officer Commanding 4th Infantry Division on 1 August 1942. In November 1942, at the start of Battle of Stalingrad, his division was part of the 7th Corps (commanded by lieutenant general Florea Mitrănescu) of the Fourth Army (under the command of lieutenant general Constantin Constantinescu-Claps). On 27 November 1942, Alinescu was dismissed by Conducător Ion Antonescu and put into reserve, the command of the 4th Division being assigned to colonel Ion A. Dumitriu. In 1943 Alinescu was promoted to major general (in reserve), and on 1 July 1945 he was recalled to active duty.

He died in Bucharest in 1952.
