= Corneliu Carp =

Romanian general

- Born: 1895
- Died: 1982 (aged 86–87)
- Allegiance: Romania
- Rank: Brigadier general
- Commands: 8th Cavalry Division; 5th Cavalry Division; Cavalry Instruction Center

Corneliu Carp (1895–1982) was a Romanian brigadier-general during World War II.

He advanced in rank to lieutenant colonel in 1934, and to colonel in 1938. He was Chief of Staff Military Command of the Oil Fields and then Deputy Commandant of Odessa in 1941. From 10 May 1942 to 1 January 1943 he served as General Officer Commanding the 8th Cavalry Division, being succeeded in this position by Colonel Radu Korne. After being but at disposition of the Cavalry Corps in 1942, he was appointed in 1943 Commandant Cavalry Instruction Center. From July 1943 to November 1944, Carp served as General Officer Commanding the 5th Cavalry Division. In March 1944 he was promoted to brigadier general, and became Vice Chief of the General Staff in July 1945. Carp went into reserve in August 1946, retired in August 1947, and was arrested in 1950. In 1951, he was condemned to 12 years imprisonment, but was released in 1955.
