= Walter Heitz =

German general

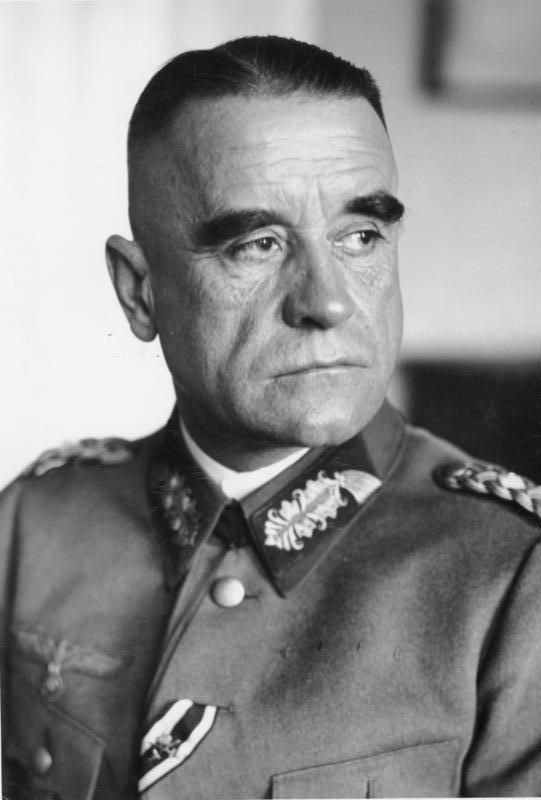
- Heitz in 1936

President of the Reichskriegsgericht
- In office 1 August 1936 – 12 September 1939
- Preceded by: Position established
- Succeeded by: Max Bastian

Personal details
- Born: 8 December 1878 Berlin, German Empire
- Died: 9 February 1944 (aged 65) Moscow, Russian SFSR, Soviet Union

Military service
- Allegiance: German Empire; Weimar Republic; Nazi Germany
- Branch/service: German Army
- Years of service: 1898–1944
- Rank: Generaloberst
- Commands: Danzig-West Prussia Garrison; VIII Corps
- Battles/wars: World War I; World War II; Invasion of Poland; Battle of France; Operation Barbarossa; Battle of Białystok–Minsk; First Battle of Smolensk; Battle of Stalingrad (POW)
- Awards: Knight's Cross of the Iron Cross with Oak Leaves

Walter Heitz (8 December 1878 – 9 February 1944) was a German general (Generaloberst) in the Wehrmacht during World War II. He served as President of the Reich Military Court and commanded part of the 6th Army in the Battle of Stalingrad.

A decorated World War I officer and supporter of Nazism, Heitz advanced rapidly under the Third Reich. In 1936, he became the president of the Reich Military Court. At the age of 60, Heitz took command of the VIII Army Corps and participated in the Invasion of Poland, the Battle of France and Operation Barbarossa, the invasion of the Soviet Union. Heitz continued to command the VIII Army Corps as part of the 6th Army in the Battle of Stalingrad. The 6th Army was encircled within the city after Operation Uranus, the Soviet counter-offensive in Stalingrad, and eventually destroyed. Heitz surrendered the central pocket of German forces in Stalingrad on 31 January 1943 and died as a prisoner of war in the Soviet Union.

== World War I ==
Born in Berlin on December 8, 1878, Heitz joined the Prussian army on August 18, 1899. Commissioned as a second lieutenant, he became battalion adjutant in 1909 and was promoted to captain in 1913. At the outbreak of World War I, he was regimental adjutant of the 36th (2nd West Prussian) Field Artillery Regiment “Hochmeister”. He remained with his regiment during World War I, where he became a battery commander and battalion commander, and fought in East Prussia (1914), on the Russian Front (1914–1915), and on the Western Front from the fall of 1915 until the end of the war. During the war, he was awarded the Wehrmacht long service award House Order of Hohenzollern with swords.

== Interwar Period ==
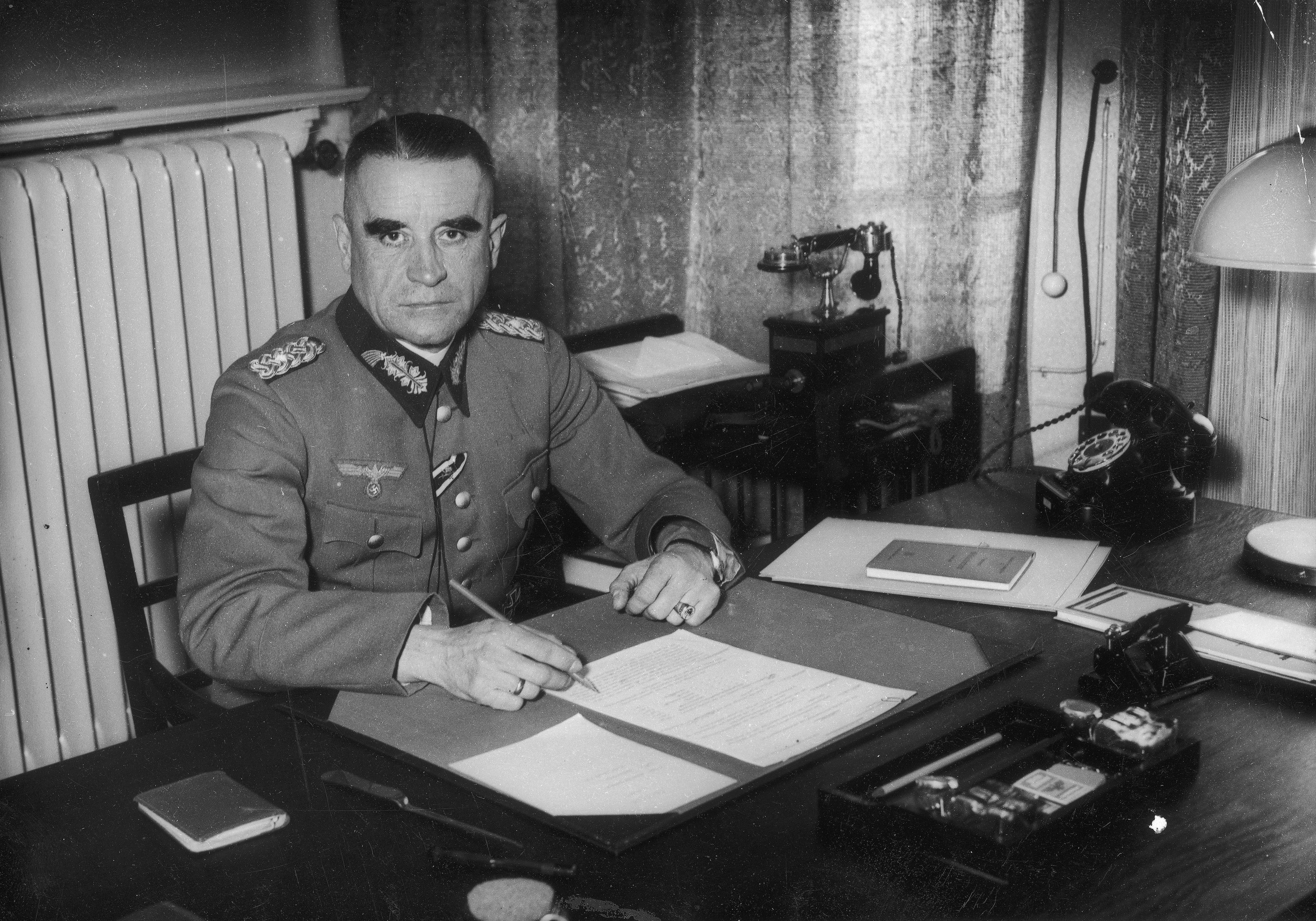
Heitz in 1936 as the President of the Reichskriegsgericht (Reich Military Court)

Selected for the reduced Reichswehr, he served on the staff of the Artillery School at Jueterbog (1919–1922) and in the Artillery Inspectorate in the Defense Ministry (1922–1927). He then commanded the 4th (Saxon) Artillery Regiment at Dresden (1927–1929), the Troop Maneuver Area at Jueterbog (1929–1930), and the Artillery School itself (1930–1931). Heitz eventually became the commander of Fortress Koenigsberg in late 1931 and achieved the rank of Colonel.

Described by historian Samuel W. Mitcham as a "harsh, right-wing career officer", Heitz was a staunch supporter of Nazism and Hitler. This played a partial role in his appointment as the President of the Reichskriegsgericht (Reich Military Court) on 1 August 1936, Nazi Germany's highest military court. On 1 April 1937 Heitz was promoted to General of the Artillery (General der Artillerie).

On 17 August 1938, during Heitz's appointment as president of the Reichskriegsgericht, Wehrkraftzersetzung (undermining military force) was established as a sedition offence in German military law, which criminalized all criticism, dissent and behavior opposed to Nazi political and military leadership, particularly within the Wehrmacht's military justice. The Wehrkraftzersetzung consolidated and redefined paragraphs already in the military penal code to punish "seditious" acts such as conscientious objection, defeatist statements, self-mutilation, and questioning the Endsieg. Convictions were punishable by the death penalty, heavy sentences in military prisons, concentration camps, and forced mobilization in combat or penal units. In 1939, a second decree was issued extending the law to civilians.

== World War II ==
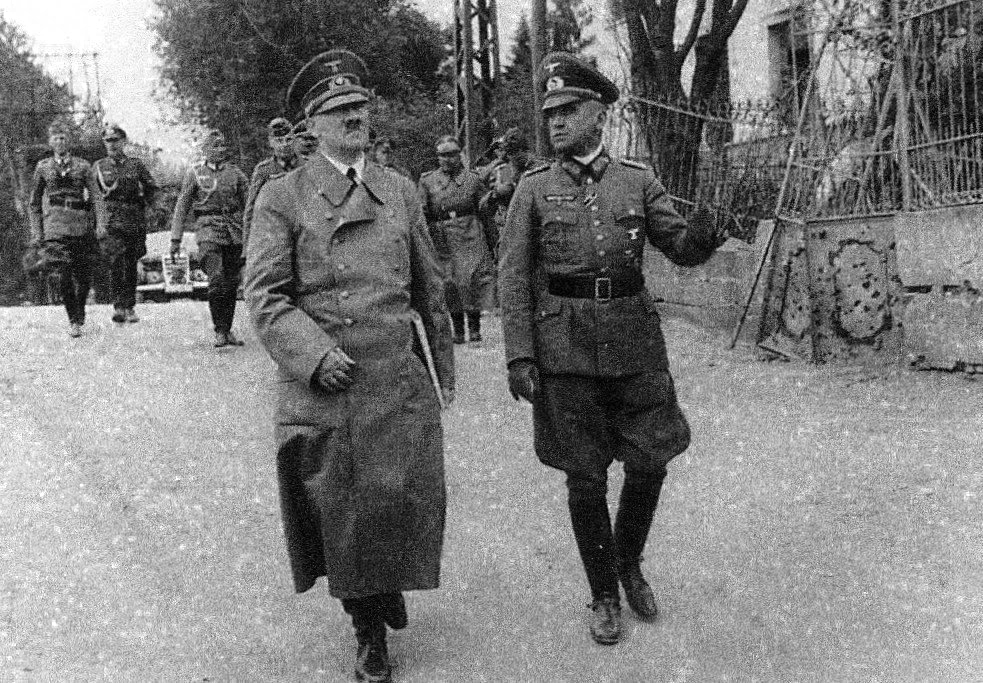
Hitler touring the WWI battlefields of Arras with Heitz, a fellow veteran, May 1940

At the outbreak of the Second World War in 1939, Heitz was already 60 years old and would have gone into retirement. Nevertheless, he requested to be sent into the frontlines. On September 14, 1939, during the invasion of Poland Heitz was appointed as the commander of the armed forces in Danzig-West Prussia, partially because of his hatred for the Poles. On September 10, 1939, he wrote enthusiastically that he would “rule the area with a mailed fist” and that the combat troops under his command were "over inclined towards a false sense of chivalry." However, his command in Danzig-West Prussia only lasted four weeks.

On October 25, 1939, Heitz was appointed as the commanding general of the VIII Army Corps despite his advanced age. He led the Corps in the Invasion of France and on 4 September 1940 he was awarded the Knight's Cross of the Iron Cross for personally scouting for river crossings and leading his troops across the Oise river under enemy fire.

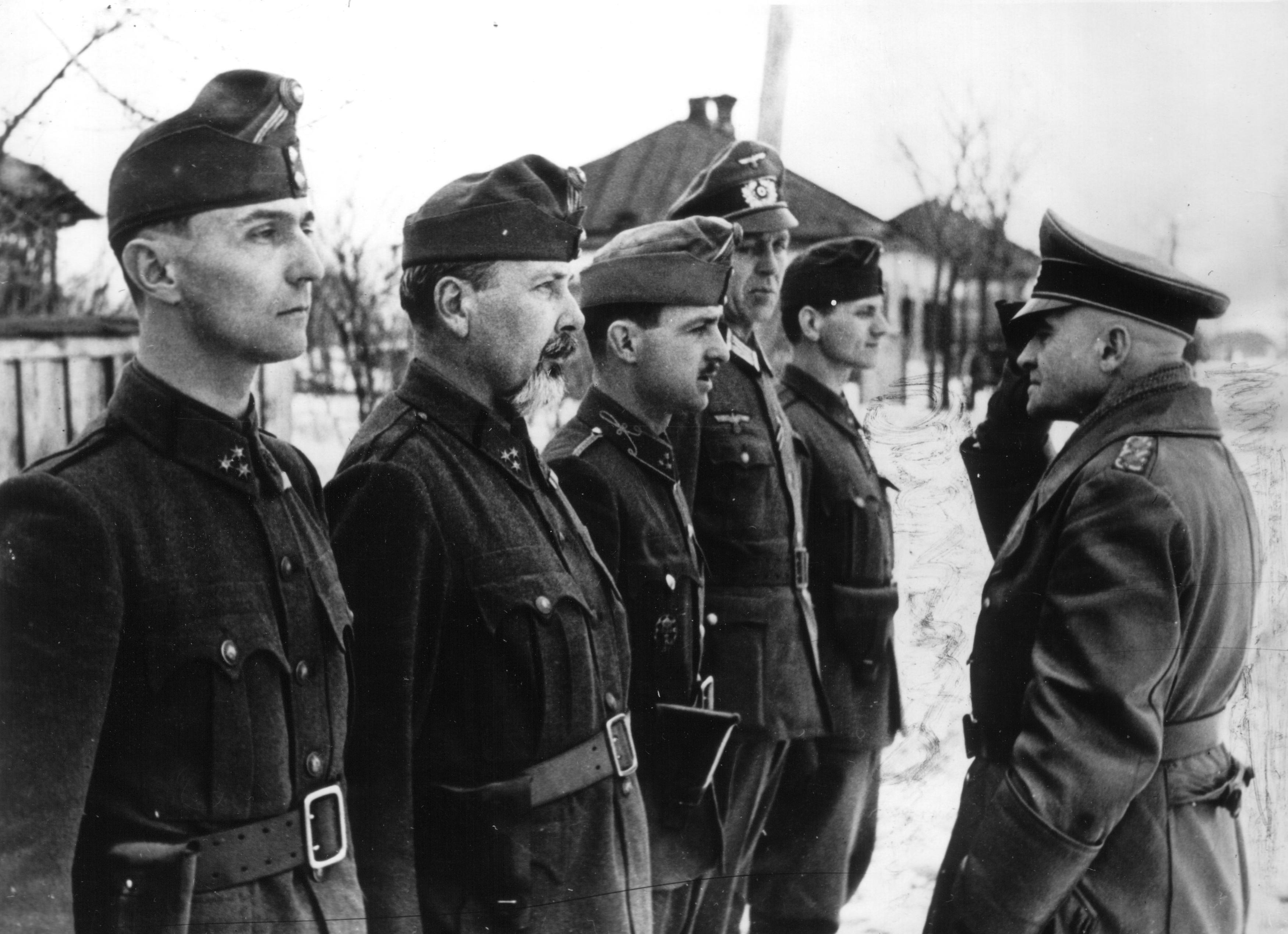
Heitz reviews a formation of Hungarian and German soldiers in the Soviet Union, 1942

Heitz continued to command the VIII Army Corps during the German invasion of the Soviet Union Operation Barbarossa. The Corps was sent into central Russia, and took part in the Battle of Białystok–Minsk and the First Battle of Smolensk. After an interlude in the fall of 1941 when the VIII Corps was sent into Paris for occupation duty, the Corps was sent back to the Eastern Front. In the summer of 1942, the Corps was sent towards Southern Russia to participate in the main German strategic summer offensive of the year, Case Blue. In the offensive, Army Group B which included Heitz's Corps was to attack towards the Volga river and Stalingrad.

=== Stalingrad, captivity, and death ===
In August 1942, the VIII Army Corps was sent along with the rest of the 6th Army, commanded by General der Panzertruppe Friedrich Paulus into Stalingrad. The Germans managed to capture 90% of the ruined city, splitting the remaining Soviet forces in the city into two narrow pockets. On 19 November the Soviet forces launched Operation Uranus, a massive counteroffensive that involved over 1 million Soviet military personnel, aimed against Hungarian and Romanian units defending the 6th Army's flanks. The outnumbered and under-equipped Romanian 3rd Army at the northern flank and Romanian 4th Army Corps at the southern flank were overrun and by 23 November, the VIII Army Corps along with the rest of the German 6th Army was encircled and threatened with destruction.

As the situation worsened for the Germans in Stalingrad, he ordered defeatists and every man who attempted surrender to be shot and coined the slogan: "We fight to the last bullet but one!" Meanwhile, other generals such as General der Artillerie Walther von Seydlitz-Kurzbach, had already given their regimental and battalion commanders permission to act and surrender independently according to local conditions. When Seydlitz released his divisional commanders on 25 January to decide for themselves whether or not to surrender, Paulus relieved him of his command and placed all of Seydlitz's divisions under Heitz. A few days later when Seydlitz and over a dozen other officers fled the German lines to surrender, bursts of machine-gun fire were aimed at them from German lines, Seydlitz later claimed that 2 German officers were mortally wounded because of Heitz's 'apocalyptic order'. On 29 January 1943, Heitz ordered that "Whoever surrenders, will be shot! Whoever displays the white flag, will be shot! Whoever does not immediately deliver bread or sausages dropped by our pilots, will be shot!" As late as the 31 of January, German soldiers who attempted surrender were shot in the back on the basis of Heitz's orders.

On 26 January 1943, the German forces inside Stalingrad were split into two pockets north and south of Mamayev Kurgan. The northern pocket consisted of the XI Corps, and the VIII Corps, under Heitz. On 28 January, the two pockets were split into three. The northern pocket consisted of the XI Corps, the central with the VIII and LI Corps, and the southern with the XIV Panzer Corps and IV Corps "without units". The sick and wounded reached 40,000 to 50,000. On 29 January, Heitz had stated that he would seek the death of a soldier while defending his command post. He later attempted suicide but was stopped by his chief of staff. On 31 January 1943, Heitz surrendered the central pocket of German forces.

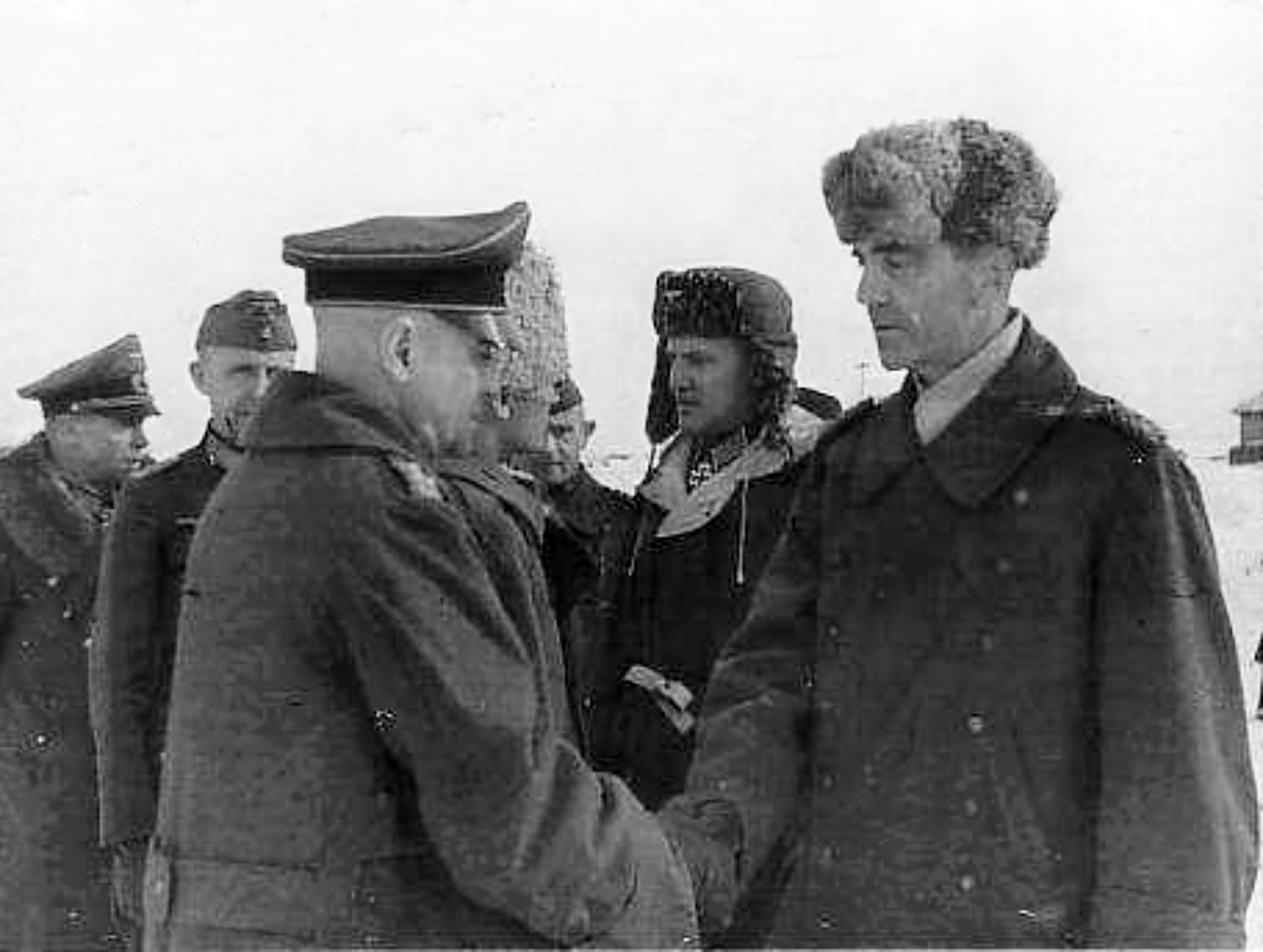
Paulus meets with Heitz and other German generals captured in Stalingrad, February 4, 1943

At the time of his surrender, Heitz was the second-highest ranking German officer taken prisoner by the Allies, behind Paulus. In prison, he vehemently refused to cooperate with the anti-fascist National Committee for a Free Germany that operated out of the Soviet Union, despite being pressured by the Soviets, who beat him and threatened his family. He died on 9 February 1944 while in Soviet captivity.

== Awards ==
- Iron Cross (1914)
  - 2nd Class
  - 1st Class
- Wound Badge (1918)
  - in Black
- Hanseatic Cross of Hamburg
- Knight's Cross of the House Order of Hohenzollern with Swords
- Honour Cross of the World War 1914/1918
- Wehrmacht Long Service Award 4th with 1st class
- Clasp to the Iron Cross (1939) 2nd Class (10 October 1939) & 1st Class (19 May 1940)
- German Cross in Gold on 22 April 1942 as General der Artillerie and commanding general of the VIII. Armeekorps
- Knight's Cross of the Iron Cross with Oak Leaves
  - Knight's Cross on 4 September 1940 as General der Artillerie and commanding general of the VIII. Armeekorps
  - 156th Oak Leaves on 21 December 1942 als General der Artillerie and commanding general of the VIII. Armeekorps

Military offices
Preceded by General der Infanterie Ernst Busch	Commander of VIII. Armeekorps; 25 October 1939 – 31 January 1943	Succeeded by General der Infanterie Gustav Höhne
