= Constantin Brătescu =

Romanian general

- Born: 8 March 1892 unknown
- Died: 13 April 1971 (aged 79) unknown
- Military career
- Allegiance: Romania (unknown–1948); Nazi Germany (1941–1942)
- Branch: Romanian Army
- Service years: sometime during the 1910s – 1948
- Rank: Major General
- Conflicts: World War II; Eastern Front; Operation Barbarossa; Battle of Stalingrad
- Awards: Order of the Star of Romania, Officer class

Constantin Brătescu (March 8, 1892 – April 13, 1971) was a Romanian major-general during World War II.

He was awarded the Order of the Star of Romania, Officer class, on June 8, 1940. In 1941, he served first as Chief Propaganda Section General Staff (Romania's Propaganda Minister) and then as a Romanian liaison officer to the German Military Mission, meaning that he served as a German military officer during Operation Barbarossa and the Axis Invasion of the Soviet Union. Starting in 1942 Brătescu was a Romanian General Officer (at the rank of Major-General) and commanded the 1st Cavalry Division throughout the campaign against the Soviets, fighting in such engagements as Operation Barbarossa, Case Blue, and the Battle of Stalingrad. At Stalingrad, Brătescu's 1st Cavalry Division was subordinated to the 4th Army Corps, under the command of General Constantin Sănătescu, which in turn was part of the Romanian 3rd Army, under the command of General Petre Dumitrescu. Following the surrender of Friedrich Paulus' 6th Army at the Battle of Stalingrad, Brătescu became a prisoner of war and was held captive in the Soviet Union from 1943 to 1948.

During a visit to Moscow in April 1946, the composer George Enescu and his wife, Princess Maruca Cantacuzino, asked the Soviet authorities to free Brătescu and a fellow prisoner, General Nicolae Mazarini. Brătescu was released in 1948, after five years of imprisonment, and subsequently retired from active service. He died in 1971, at the age of seventy-nine.
