= Max Pfeffer =

German Nazi General (1883–1955)

- Born: 7 June 1883
- Died: 31 December 1955 (aged 72); Voikovo prison camp
- Military career
- Allegiance: German Empire; Weimar Republic; Nazi Germany
- Branch: German Army
- Service years: 1902–1945
- Rank: General der Artillerie
- Commands: 297th Infantry Division; IV Army Corps
- Conflicts: World War I World War II
- Awards: Knight's Cross of the Iron Cross

Max Pfeffer (7 June 1883 – 31 December 1955) was a general in the Wehrmacht of Nazi Germany during World War II who commanded the IV Army Corps. He was a recipient of the Knight's Cross of the Iron Cross.

Pfeffer surrendered to the Soviet forces at the conclusion of the Battle of Stalingrad in 1943. Convicted as a war criminal in the Soviet Union, he died in captivity in 1955.

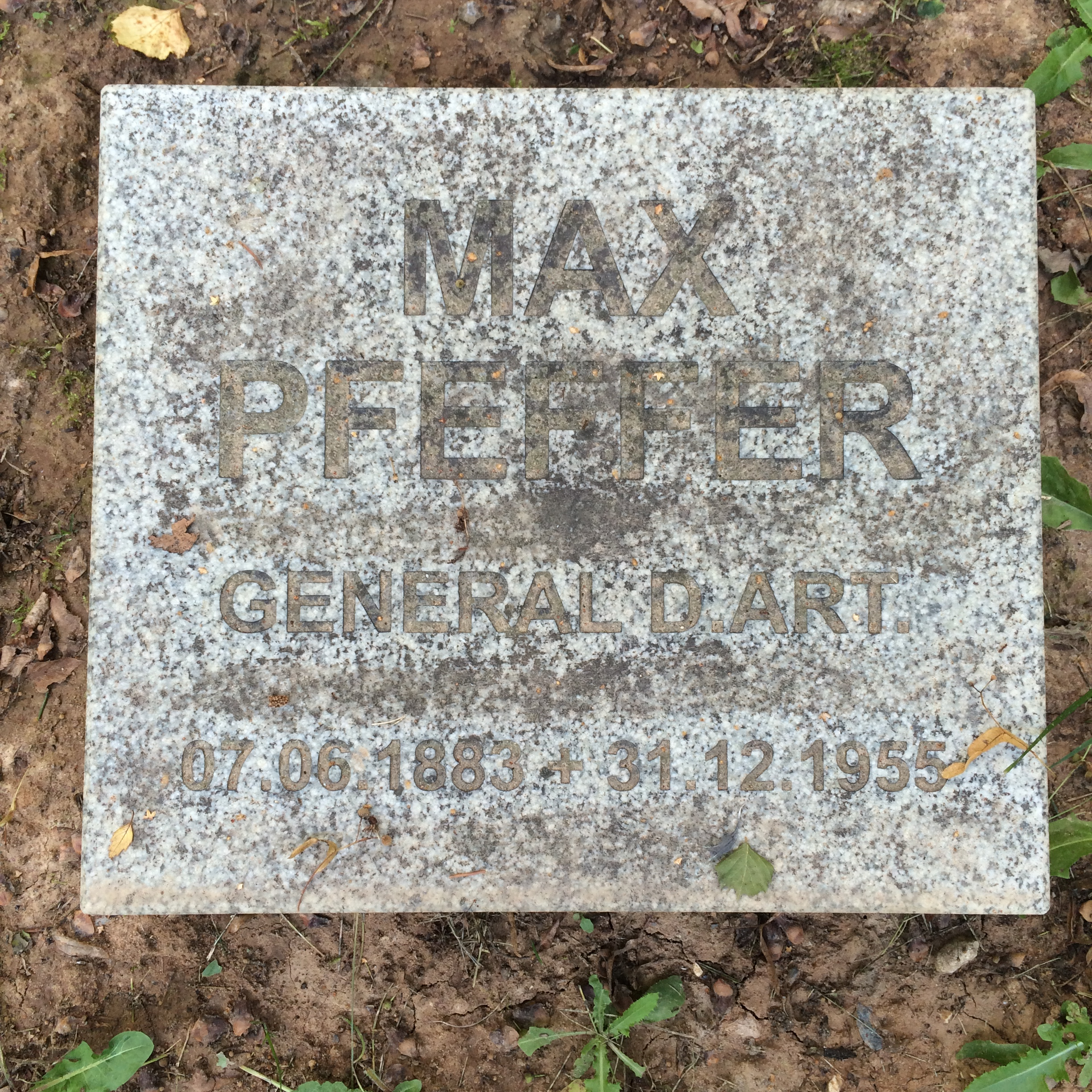
Grave in Cherntsy

== Awards and decorations ==
- Knight's Cross of the Iron Cross on 4 December 1941 as Generalleutnant and commander of 297. Infanterie-Division

Military offices
Preceded by none	Commander of 297. Infanterie-Division; 5 April 1940 - 16 January 1943	Succeeded by Generalmajor Moritz von Drebber
Preceded by General der Pionere Erwin Jaenecke	Commander of IV. Armeekorps; 17 January 1943 - 31 January 1943	Succeeded by General der Infanterie Friedrich Mieth
