= 297th Infantry Division =

- 297. Infanterie-Division
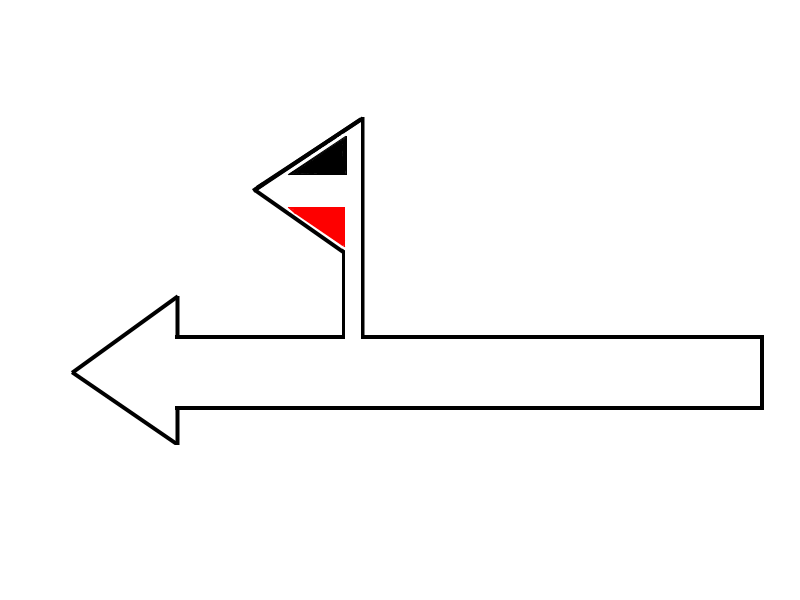
- 297. Infanterie Division Vehicle Insignia
- Active: February 1940 - January 1943; April 1943 - May 1945
- Country: Nazi Germany
- Branch: Army
- Type: Infantry
- Size: Division
- Engagements: World War II; Operation Barbarossa; Battle of Kiev; Battle of Stalingrad; German winter offensive in Albania (1943–1944)

Commanders
- Notable commanders: General of the Artillery Max Pfeffer

The 297th Infantry Division (German: 297. Infanterie-Division) was an Infantry Division within the German Army, active during the Second World War. It was one of the components of the 6th Army during its failed attack on Stalingrad.

== Operational history ==
The 297th Infantry Division was activated on 31 January 1940 and raised in March as part of the eighth wave of Wehrmacht divisions, assembled from the men of Military district "WK VII", which is now Bruck an der Leitha and the surrounding Lower Austrian areas, out of men from the 27th; 44th; 45th; 57th and 268th Infantry Divisions. The divisions of the eighth wave were referred to by some as the "class of 1918", as they consisted largely of young men born in that year, who would be the ages of 21 and 22 upon being called-up.

The division served as an OKH reserve division throughout the Western Campaign of 1940, later being re-stationed in Poland in July 1940 as the initial preparations for Operation Barbarossa were made.

=== Barbarossa, Stalingrad and capitulation ===
The 297th Infantry Division attacked through Ukraine as part of Army Group South to meet its objective in conquering Kiev. The division first aided in the capture of Zhytomyr in July, followed by Uman the following month before taking out Kiev in September. It then went through a war-torn Kharkov and into Rostov before the year ended. During the take-over of Ukraine, the division served as part of the 6th Army's XLIV Army Corps, under General of the Infantry Koch.

The division survived the hazards of the Soviet winter offensive, being moved around the 6th Army in January as the Wehrmacht prepared to continue their assault on the Soviet Union, helping to re-take Kharkov in May. The division's commander, Lieutenant General Max Pfeffer, anticipating a long upcoming struggle, joked to a Captain under his command over the latter's reluctance to accept a transfer offer to France, saying "just be happy that you're getting a break. The war will last long enough and be terrible enough for you to get a good taste of it." On 10 June the division began crossing the Seversky Donets River by assault boat, constructing a bridge for other units, including the 14th Panzer Division. The division continued to make inroads around the Black Sea to attack the industrial city of Stalingrad, serving in IV corps under General of the Engineers Erwin Jaenecke.

During the Battle of Stalingrad, some units within the division were seen to construct caves which would later be transformed into a field hospital and an equipment storage room. The division fought in the ruined city until Field Marshal Friedrich Paulus' surrender in January 1943, with the 297th division's and IV Army Corps mutual commander, General Pfeffer, following suit into Soviet captivity on the 16th. With the airfield lost to the Red Army, the division was so badly-beaten it could hardly be considered a proper fighting force. Pfeffer's successor as division commander, Major General Moritz von Drebber, finally surrendered to the Red Army a mere nine days later. A photograph of Drebber and several other Axis commanders was taken; one of the men photographed was Dr. Otto Renoldi, the chief surgeon for the 6th Army. A chaplain for the division was executed by a Soviet officer when he bent over to treat a wounded man.

=== Reformation and the Balkans ===
The division was recreated in Bordeaux in the spring of 1943 before being sent over to Yugoslavia in July, where it took part in anti-partisan activities. In November, elements of the division were transferred-over to the newly formed 367th Infantry Division. In February 1944, its commanding officer, Lieutenant General Deutsch, was injured in a car accident in Vlorë, dying the following month; Lieutenant General Gullmann took over for several days before command transferred to Lieutenant General Baier. By the Autumn of 1944, the division was in a retreat to Montenegro from the growing forces of Josip Broz Tito, soon after being under attacked from the approaching Soviet Army. The division remained active up until German surrender in May 1945, when its men gave themselves up to the Yugoslavs.

== Commanders ==
The following officers commanded 297th Infantry Division:

- Lieutenant General Max Pfeffer (5 Apr 1940 - 16 Jan 1943)
- Lieutenant General Moritz von Drebber (16 Jan 1943 - 25 Jan 1943)
- Lieutenant General Friedrich-Wilhelm Deutsch (1 Apr 1943 - 17 Feb 1944)
- Lieutenant General Otto Gullmann (17 Feb 1944 - 20 Feb 1944)
- Lieutenant General Albrecht Baier (20 Feb 1944 - 8 May 1945)

== See also ==
- List of German divisions in World War II
