= Perekopka =

Perekopka Перекопка
- Khutor
- Location within Volgograd Oblast Location within Russia
- Coordinates: 49°21′N 43°20′E
- Country: Russia
- Region: Volgograd Oblast
- District: Kletsky District
- Time zone: UTC+4:00

Perekopka (Russian: Перекопка) is a rural locality (a khutor) and the administrative center of Perekopskoye Rural Settlement, Kletsky District, Volgograd Oblast, Russia. The population was 853 as of 2010. There are 13 streets.

== Geography ==
Perekopka is located in steppe, 29 km northeast of Kletskaya (the district's administrative centre) by road. Perekopskaya is the nearest rural locality.
