= Bolshaya Doshchinka =

Bolshaya Doshchinka Большая Донщинка
- Khutor
- Location within Volgograd Oblast Location within Russia
- Coordinates: 49°08′N 42°26′E
- Country: Russia
- Region: Volgograd Oblast
- District: Kletsky District
- Time zone: UTC+4:00

Bolshaya Doshchinka (Russian: Большая Донщинка) is a rural locality (a khutor) in Perelazovskoye Rural Settlement, Kletsky District, Volgograd Oblast, Russia. The population was 50 as of 2010. There are 3 streets.

== Geography ==
Bolshaya Doshchinka is located on the Donshchinka River, 55 km southwest of Kletskaya (the district's administrative centre) by road. Malaya Donshchinka is the nearest rural locality.
