= Constantin Constantinescu-Claps =

Romanian general

- General Constantin Constantinescu-Claps
- Born: 20 February 1884; Beceni, Buzău County, Kingdom of Romania
- Died: June 1961 (aged 77); Bacău, Romanian People's Republic
- Education: Higher War School
- Spouse(s): Henrietta, née Răileanu
- Children: Radu Constantinescu
- Military career
- Allegiance: Kingdom of Romania
- Branch: Romanian Land Forces
- Service years: 1905–1944
- Rank: Army General (1st class)
- Commands: 4th Army
- Conflicts: Second Balkan War; First World War; Battle of Transylvania; Third Battle of Oituz; World War II; Operation Barbarossa; Operation München; Siege of Odessa; Battle of Stalingrad
- Awards: Order of the Crown (Romania); Order of the Star of Romania; Order of Michael the Brave

Constantin Constantinescu-Claps (February 20, 1884 – June 1961) was a Romanian general during World War II who commanded the Romanian Fourth Army at the Battle of Stalingrad.

== Biography ==
He was born in Beceni, Buzău County in 1884. From 1903 to 1905 he attended the Military School of Artillery and Genius, graduating with the rank of second lieutenant, advancing to lieutenant in 1909 and captain in 1913. During the Second Balkan War and the Romanian Campaign of World War I he served with the 12th Artillery Regiment. He fought in the Battle of Transylvania in 1916 and the battle of Măgura Cașin in 1917. For his valor, he was promoted to major in 1917 and was awarded in 1917 the Order of the Crown, Knight rank. After the war, Constantinescu-Claps was promoted to lieutenant colonel in 1919, and attended the Higher War School in 1919–1920.

During the interwar period he rose through the ranks in the Romanian Army, being promoted to colonel in 1925 and brigadier general in 1935. On February 1, 1940, he was promoted to major general and was appointed the commander of X Corps. In June 1940 he coordinated the retreat of the Corps during the Soviet occupation of Bessarabia and Northern Bukovina. On May 9, 1941 he was awarded the Order of the Star of Romania, Commander rank.

After Romania entered World War II on the side of the Axis in June 1941, Constantinescu-Claps commanded the XI Corps from July 18, 1941, during Operation Barbarossa. He took part in Operation München and the Siege of Odessa. In the early stages of Operation Barbarossa, General Nicolae Ciupercă noted: "General Constantinescu has led the army corps with a lot of competence, causing, indirectly, the withdrawal of the Soviet forces between the Dniester River and the Suhoz Lake. I consider him to be a very good army corps commander, who is distinguished by great devotion and precious optimism". On November 9, 1941, Constantinescu-Claps was appointed the commander of the Romanian Fourth Army and was promoted to lieutenant general in January 1942.

Soviet advance at Stalingrad from November 19 to November 28, 1942. Constantinescu's 4th Army is located at the bottom of the map.

He fought later that year at the Battle of Stalingrad, where the Romanian armies suffered a crushing defeat. Constantinescu’s 4th Army, with 75,580 men, comprising the 6th Army Corps (1st, 2nd, 18th, and 20th Infantry Divisions) and the 7th Army Corps (4th Infantry Division, 5th and 8th Cavalry Divisions), was deployed to the south of Stalingrad. Most of these formations were in deplorable shape, with at best 73% of necessary manpower, with the 1st Infantry Division going as low as 25% and an almost nonexistent arsenal of heavy antitank guns. The 4th Army occupied a line running approximately 170 miles (270 km) from Staraya Otrada to Sarpa, which provided the perfect spot for Marshal Georgy Zhukov's southern strike at the start of Operation Uranus. On 20 November 1942, the Romanian Fourth Army was attacked by the Soviet 57th and 51st Armies, with the main blow in the sector of the 6th Army Corps. In all, the Romanian Army lost 158,854 men (dead, wounded and missing) between November 19, 1942 and January 7, 1943.

On February 10, 1943, Constantinescu-Claps was relieved of his assignment and replaced by Constantin Sănătescu. He retired from the Army in 1943. In spite of his rank and unlike many other Romanian generals, he never received any German medals and was in conflict with Conducător Ion Antonescu.

After King Michael's Coup of August 1944, Constantinescu-Claps received the Order of Michael the Brave, 3rd class, and was promoted to general (reserve) in September 1944. Once the Communist regime was established in Romania, he was arrested in September 1951, and incarcerated at Văcărești Prison. Accused of giving the order to execute four Soviet partisans at Biliaivka, he was condemned to 15 years' imprisonment in November 1954. One year later he was exonerated and released; he died in 1961 in Bacău.

He was married to Henrietta, née Răileanu, a descendant on her mother's side of the Sturdza and Rosetti families; the two had a son, Radu Constantinescu (1919–1998). In 2019, a street in Buzău was named after Constantinescu-Claps.

== See also ==
- Axis order of battle at the Battle of Stalingrad
- Operation Uranus
- Romania during World War II
- Romanian armies in the Battle of Stalingrad
