= Radu Korne =

Romanian general

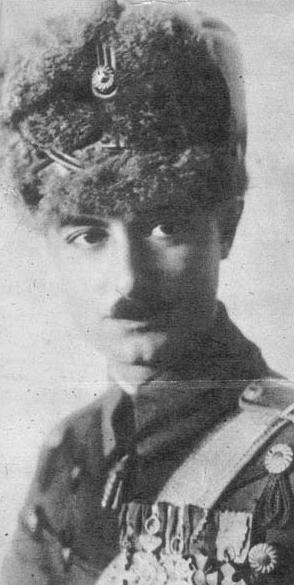
- Radu Korne in 1943
- Born: 23 December 1895; Bucharest, Kingdom of Romania
- Died: 28 April 1949 (aged 53); Văcărești Prison, Bucharest, Romanian People's Republic
- Burial place: Eternitatea cemetery, Iași
- Alma mater: Higher War School, Bucharest; École de cavalerie, Saumur
- Children: Mihai Korne (son)
- Military career
- Allegiance: Kingdom of Romania
- Branch: Army
- Service years: 1913–1944
- Rank: Brigadier General
- Commands: 6th Motorized Roșiori Regiment; 8th Cavalry Division; 1st Armored Division
- Conflicts: World War I; Hungarian–Romanian War; World War II; Eastern Front; Operation München; Battle of the Sea of Azov; Siege of Sevastopol; Battle of the Kerch Peninsula; Crimean campaign; Battle of the Caucasus; Battle of Stalingrad; Second Jassy–Kishinev Offensive
- Awards: Order of Michael the Brave, 3rd and 2nd Class; Order of the Star of Romania, Officer rank Knight's Cross of the Iron Cross

Radu Korne (23 December 1895 – 28 April 1949) was a Romanian Brigadier General during World War II.

== Biography ==
=== World War I ===
He was born in Bucharest. From 1913 to 1915 he studied at the Cavalry Officer School in Târgoviște, graduating with the rank of second lieutenant. He fought in World War I with the 4th Regiment Roșiori "Regina Maria", and in 1917 was promoted to lieutenant. He stood out in August 1917 during the Third Battle of Oituz, when he commanded a machine-gun detachment in the assault on Tarapan Hill, and was later wounded in action; for his valor, he was decorated with the Order of Michael the Brave, 3rd class. In the spring of 1919 he served with the 4th Regiment in the Hungarian–Romanian War, first in command of the 2nd Squadron and then of a machine-gun group. In October 1919 he was promoted to captain.

=== The interwar period ===
Korne continued his military training in 1921–23 at the Higher War School in Bucharest, and in 1925–26 at the Saumur Cavalry School in France. He was then named cavalry instructor and tactics professor at the Special Cavalry School in Sibiu; promoted in 1927 to the rank of major, he became the school’s director of studies. In 1934 he was promoted to the rank of lieutenant colonel and assigned to command the 1st Battalion/9th Călărași Regiment. Subsequently he was chief of staff of the 12th Division and then of the General Inspectorate of the Cavalry, after which he was promoted in 1939 to the rank of colonel and given the command of the 8th Roșiori Regiment.

=== World War II ===
The start of Operation Barbarossa on 22 June 1941 found Colonel Korne in command of the 6th Motorized Roșiori Regiment from the 5th Cavalry Brigade, which was stationed in Northern Moldavia. On 4 July, as part of Operation München, the brigade crossed the Prut River and advanced with a detachment commanded by Korne towards Lipnic, reaching the Dniester River on 7 July. After forcing the river on 17 July and breaking through the Stalin Line, situated on the left bank, his regiment advanced to the Bug River, reaching it at the beginning of August. By the end of the month his regiment was at the Dnieper River; crossing the river on 19 September, it continued to advance north of the Sea of Azov. On 25 September, at the start of the Battle of the Sea of Azov, the 5th Cavalry Brigade faced the powerful Soviet offensive carried out by the 9th and 18th Armies, being attacked by a much superior force in the Yakymivka area. The 6th Motorized Roșiori Regiment stood its ground, even though the rest of the brigade was pushed back. The offensive ran out of steam after several days and the German–Romanian counterattack led to the encirclement and destruction of the two Soviet armies. For his actions during the battle, Colonel Korne was awarded on 12 February 1942 the Order of Michael the Brave, 2nd class by King Michael I.

Korne was engaged in follow-up operations in Crimea. Breaching the Isthmus of Perekop on 28 October 1941, his regiment moved towards Simferopol, cut the retreat roads to Yevpatoria, and then took part in the siege of Sevastopol and the Battle of the Kerch Peninsula. Korne's units fought at Feodosia and on the road to Kerch alongside the German troops of Colonel Karl-Albrecht von Groddeck. By 11 May, the German XXX Army Corps surrounded eight Soviet divisions, allowing a motorized brigade, under the command of which was also the "Colonel Korne" Motorized Detachment, to enter the city of Kerch, behind the Red Army defense perimeter.

Starting in August 1942 Korne fought in the Battle of the Caucasus, reaching Anapa at the end of the month, and then Novorossiysk, which fell to Wehrmacht and Romanian Army units at the beginning of September. On 7 October, Korne took command of 8th Cavalry Division and engaged in the Battle of Stalingrad, as part of the 4th Romanian Army, under the command of lieutenant general Constantin Constantinescu-Claps. After the start of the Soviet offensive on 20 November, the division pulled back; its attempt to reach the encircled German 6th Army failed. The newly formed "Korne Detachment" (3rd, 4th Cavalry Regiments, 2nd Artillery Battalion, and the 7th Heavy Artillery Regiment), backed by German armored units, launched a counterattack towards Abganerovo; the action failed due to lack of effective anti-tank weapons. On 22 November, Korne's Detachment was attacked in the Krasnay-Geroy area, suffering heavy losses. On 26 November, the Korne and "Pannwitz" Detachments managed to push back the Soviet troops which had infiltrated between the Romanian formations. The next day, the Soviets broke through the lines of defense, and the general retreat started.

In January 1943, Korne was promoted to the rank of brigadier general, and was appointed commander of the 8th Cavalry Division (succeeding Colonel Corneliu Carp). At the time, he was considered to be the foremost expert in Romania on mechanized operations. On April 4, 1944, he took command of the 1st Armored Division; equipped with several dozen Pz IV tanks and a dozen Stug III assault guns, as well as some SPW armoured personnel carriers for the infantry troops, the division was the strongest formation of the Romanian Army at the time. In July, the 1st Armored Division was given the name "România Mare" and was put in the reserve of Army Group Wöhler, comprising the 4th Romanian Army (under the command of lieutenant general Ioan Mihail Racoviță) and the 6th German Army. At the start of the Soviet Second Jassy–Kishinev Offensive on 20 August, Korne's division entered in combat south of the Bahlui River, near Scobâlțeni. Starting at 05:15, a 90–100 minute Soviet artillery and aviation bombardment destroyed the Romanian forward lines, and hundreds of tanks of the 6th Guards Tank Army poured through the breach. While many Romanian units disintegrated under this attack, with thousands surrendering without a fight, Korne's division confronted head on the onslaught of the Red Army. Korne, assisted by Colonels Cristache Iliescu and Constantin Nistor, staged a counterattack against the Soviet tanks that had broken through; during the battle, the division lost 34 tanks and self-propelled guns, and destroyed 60 Soviet tanks. By 23 August his forces had established a defensive position north of Roman, between the Siret and the Moldova rivers. Later that day, a coup d'état led by King Michael I deposed Marshal Ion Antonescu and withdrew Romania from the Axis. Korne stayed in command of the 1st Division until 24 September.

At the request of the Soviet commission for the implementation of the Armistice, the division was disbanded, and Korne was arrested in October 1944, in his words, "like a common burglar". On November 16, he wrote a letter to Prime Minister Constantin Sănătescu, where he deplored the fact that so many of the Romanian senior officer corps were being dismissed en masse, while others were being arrested or harassed, after having fought in war as ordered by the king. He concluded his letter by asking, "Why are the prisons being filled with the most devoted soldiers of the country?" After being held at the military headquarters in Bucharest, he was released on 6 February 1945 from Malmaison Prison on intervention from Chief of the General Staff Sănătescu with General Vladislav Vinogradov. He was put under house arrest, and he retired from the army the next month.

=== After the war ===
Korne was investigated by the Bucharest People's Tribunal for "anti-Soviet propaganda," but on 20 June 1945 he was found not guilty. His son, Mihai, managed to escape Communist Romania in 1948 (at age 17) and settled in France. On 24 March 1948, Korne was arrested by the Siguranța Statului secret police for "conspiracy against state security," and sent to Jilava Prison. There, he was severely beaten on orders from the prison commandant, Nicolae Moromete, and was left with a broken spine, according to historian Radu Ciuceanu. At Jilava, Korne's health deteriorated rapidly; after being transferred to the hospital of Văcărești Prison on 18 April 1949, he died there 10 days later. He is buried at Eternitatea cemetery in Iași, next to a relative, General Mihail Cerchez.

== Awards ==
- Order of Michael the Brave
  - 3rd Class (2 November 1917)
  - 2nd Class (12 February 1942)
- Iron Cross (1939) 2nd and 1st Class
- Order of the Star of Romania, Officer rank (8 June 1940)
- Knight's Cross of the Iron Cross (18 December 1942)

== Legacy ==
The National Military Museum in Bucharest houses a permanent exhibition that displays personal objects which belonged to top Romanian military leaders, including memorabilia of Radu Korne.
