= Moritz von Drebber =

Moritz Otto von Drebber
- Born: 12 February 1892; Oldenburg, Duchy of Oldenburg, German Empire
- Died: 30 May 1968 (aged 76); Oldenburg, West Germany
- Military career
- Allegiance: German Empire; Weimar Republic; Nazi Germany
- Branch: Army
- Service years: 1911–1920; 1935–1945
- Rank: Generalmajor
- Commands: 297th Infantry Division
- Conflicts: Battle of Stalingrad
- Awards: Knight's Cross of the Iron Cross
- Other work: National Committee for a Free Germany

Moritz von Drebber (12 February 1892 – 30 May 1968) was a general in the Wehrmacht of Nazi Germany during World War II who commanded the 297th Infantry Division. He was a recipient of the Knight's Cross of the Iron Cross.

Drebber surrendered the division on 25 January 1943 during the Battle of Stalingrad. He then sent a letter to Friedrich Paulus stating "he and his soldiers were well received by the Red army." Drebber also asked Paulus to "give up the useless resistance and to surrender with the whole army." He joined the National Committee for a Free Germany while in captivity. He was released in 1949.

== Awards and decorations ==
- Knight's Cross of the Iron Cross on 30 June 1942 as Oberst and commander of Infanterie-Regiment 523

Military offices
Preceded by General der Artillerie Max Pfeffer	Commander of 297. Infanterie-Division; 16 January 1943 - 25 January 1943	Succeeded by Generalleutnant Friedrich-Wilhelm Deutsch
