= Aksay, Volgograd Oblast =

Aksay Аксай
- Selo
- Location within Volgograd Oblast Location within Russia
- Coordinates: 47°57′N 43°57′E
- Country: Russia
- Region: Volgograd Oblast
- District: Oktyabrsky District
- Time zone: UTC+4:00

Aksay (Russian: Аксай) is a rural locality (a selo) and the administrative center of Aksayskoye Rural Settlement, Oktyabrsky District, Volgograd Oblast, Russia. The population was 1,559 as of 2010. There are 19 streets.

== Geography ==
Aksay is located in steppe, in the valley of the Aksay Yesaulovsky River, 32 km east of Oktyabrsky (the district's administrative centre) by road. Shelestovo is the nearest rural locality.
