= Staraya Otrada =

Staraya Otrada Старая Отрада
- Selo
- Location within Bashkortostan Location within Russia
- Coordinates: 52°35′N 55°50′E
- Country: Russia
- Region: Bashkortostan
- District: Kuyurgazinsky District
- Time zone: UTC+5:00

Staraya Otrada (Russian: Старая Отрада) is a rural locality (a selo) and the administrative centre of Otradinsky Selsoviet, Kuyurgazinsky District, Bashkortostan, Russia. The population was 529 as of 2010. There are 4 streets.

== Geography ==
Staraya Otrada is located 18 km south of Yermolayevo (the district's administrative centre) by road. Savelyevka is the nearest rural locality.
