= Operation Uranus =

1942 World War II Soviet operation

- Part of the Battle of Stalingrad
Date	19–23 November 1942
Location	Near Stalingrad (now Volgograd) 48°42′N 44°31′E
Result	Soviet victory
Territorial changes	Encirclement of the German 6th Army and 4th Panzer Army

Belligerents
Soviet Union	Germany; Italy; Romania

Commanders and leaders
(Soviet Union) Joseph Stalin (Soviet Union) Georgy Zhukov (Soviet Union) Aleksandr Vasilevsky (Soviet Union) K.K. Rokossovsky (Soviet Union) Andrey Yeryomenko (Soviet Union) Nikolai Vatutin	(Nazi Germany) Adolf Hitler (Nazi Germany) Friedrich Paulus (Nazi Germany) Walter Heitz (Kingdom of Romania) Petre Dumitrescu (Fascist Italy) Italo Gariboldi

Strength
1,143,500 personnel (including reserve); 894 tanks 13,451 artillery pieces 1,500 aircraft	German: 400,000 personnel (6th Army and 4th Panzer Army) unknown number of artillery pieces 732 aircraft (402 serviceable); Italian: unknown number of artillery pieces or aircraft Romanian: 143,296–200,000 personnel 827 artillery pieces 134 tanks unknown number of aircraft

Casualties and losses
Unknown	Unknown, presumed heavy

Operation Uranus (19–23 November 1942) was a Soviet strategic operation on the Eastern Front of World War II which led to the encirclement of Axis forces in the vicinity of Stalingrad: the German Sixth Army, the Third and Fourth Romanian armies, and portions of the German Fourth Panzer Army. The Red Army carried out the operation at roughly the midpoint of the five-month long Battle of Stalingrad, aiming to destroy German forces in and around Stalingrad. Planning for Operation Uranus had commenced in September 1942, and developed simultaneously with plans to envelop and destroy German Army Group Center (Operation Mars) and German forces in the Caucasus.

Due to the length of the front lines created by the German 1942 summer offensive, which had aimed at taking the Caucasus oil fields and the city of Stalingrad, German and other Axis forces were over-extended. The German decision to transfer several mechanized divisions from the Soviet Union to Western Europe exacerbated their situation. Furthermore, Axis units in the area were depleted by months of fighting, especially those which had taken part in the struggle for Stalingrad. The Germans could only count on the XLVIII Panzer Corps, which had the strength of a single panzer division, and the 29th Panzergrenadier Division as reserves to bolster their Romanian allies guarding the German Sixth Army's flanks. These Romanian armies lacked the heavy equipment to deal with Soviet armor. In contrast, the Red Army deployed over one million personnel for the offensive. Soviet troop movements were not without problems: concealing their build-up proved difficult, and Soviet units commonly arrived late due to logistical issues. Operation Uranus was first postponed by the Soviet high command (Stavka) from 8 to 17 November, then to 19 November.

At 07:20 Moscow time on 19 November, Soviet forces assaulted the northern flank of the Axis forces at Stalingrad; attacks in the south began the next day. Although the Romanian units succeeded in repelling the first Soviet attacks, by the end of 20 November the Third and Fourth Romanian armies were in headlong retreat, as the Red Army bypassed several German infantry divisions. German mobile reserves proved too weak to parry the Soviet mechanized spearheads, while the Sixth Army did not react quickly or decisively enough to disengage German armored forces in Stalingrad and re-orient them to countering the impending threat. By late 22 November, the northern and southern Soviet forces linked up at the town of Kalach, encircling some 290,000 Axis personnel east of the Don River. Instead of attempting to break out of the encirclement, German leader Adolf Hitler decided to keep Axis forces in Stalingrad and to resupply them by air.

== Background ==
On 28 June 1942, the Wehrmacht began its offensive against Soviet forces opposite of Army Group South, codenamed Case Blue. After breaking through Red Army forces by 13 July, German forces encircled and captured the city of Rostov. Following the fall of Rostov, Hitler split German forces operating in the southern extremity of the southern Russian SFSR in an effort to simultaneously capture the city of Stalingrad and the Caucasus oil fields. The responsibility to take Stalingrad was given to the Sixth Army, which immediately turned towards the Volga River and began its advance with heavy air support from the Luftwaffe's Luftflotte 4. On 7 August, two German panzer corps were able to flank and encircle a Soviet force of 50,000 personnel and approximately 1,000 tanks, and on 22 August German forces began to cross the Don River to complete the advance towards the Volga. The following day, the Battle of Stalingrad began when vanguards of the Sixth Army penetrated the suburbs of the city.

By November, the Sixth Army had occupied most of Stalingrad, pushing the defending Red Army to the banks of the Volga River. By this stage, there were indications of an impending Soviet offensive which would target Wehrmacht forces around the city, including increased Soviet activity opposite the Sixth Army's flanks, and information gained through the interrogation of Soviet prisoners. The German command remained focused upon finalizing its capture of Stalingrad and were unsure of where or when the counterattack would take place. Actions were taken to provide a reserve behind the Italian and Romanian armies, with 6th Panzer Division and two additional infantry divisions ordered to Russia from France. However, this move would only be completed by December. Head of Army General Staff General Franz Halder had been dismissed in September after his efforts to warn about the danger which was developing along the over-extended flanks of the Sixth Army and the Fourth Panzer Army. As early as September, the Soviet Stavka (high command) began planning a series of counteroffensives to encompass the destruction of German forces in the south, fighting in Stalingrad and in the Caucasus, and against Army Group Center. Ultimately, command of Soviet efforts to relieve Stalingrad was put under the leadership of General Aleksandr Vasilevsky.

The Stavka developed two major operations to be conducted against Axis forces near Stalingrad, Uranus and Saturn, and also planned for Operation Mars, designed to engage German Army Group Center in an effort to distract reinforcements and to inflict as much damage as possible. Operation Uranus involved the use of large Soviet mechanized and infantry forces to encircle German and other Axis forces directly around Stalingrad. As preparations for the offensive commenced, the attack's starting points were positioned on stretches of front to the rear of the German Sixth Army, largely preventing the Germans from reinforcing those sectors quickly where Axis units were too overstretched to occupy effectively. The offensive was a double envelopment; Soviet mechanized forces would penetrate deep into the German rear, while another attack would be made closer to the German Sixth Army in an effort to attack German units there directly in the rear. While the Red Army prepared, the German high commanders—influenced by their belief that the Red Army, building up opposite German Army Group Center to the north, was incapable of mounting a simultaneous offensive in the south—continued to deny the possibility of an impending Soviet offensive.

== Comparison of forces ==
=== Axis ===
Case Blue involved German and other Axis forces sprawled out across a front over 480 kilometers (300 mi) wide and several hundred kilometers deep, while the decision to conquer Stalingrad had stretched Axis forces even more thinly by drawing away personnel eastwards. For example, in early July, the Sixth Army was defending a 160-kilometer (100 mi) line, while also committing to an offensive which involved a distance of around 400 kilometers (250 mi). Army Group B, which was split from Army Group South (the forces operating around the Caucasus, were named Army Group A), seemed strong on paper: it included the Second and Sixth German, Fourth Panzer, Fourth and Third Romanian, Eighth Italian, and Second Hungarian Armies. Army Group B had the 48th Panzer Corps, which had the strength of a weakened panzer division, and a single infantry division as reserves. For the most part the German flanks were held by arriving non-German Axis armies, while German forces were used to spearhead continued operations in Stalingrad and in the Caucasus.

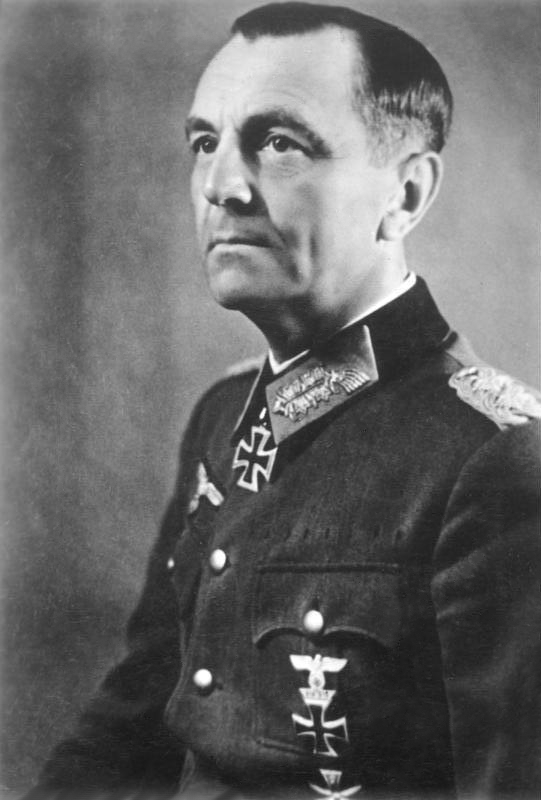
General Friedrich Paulus, commander of the German Sixth Army

While Adolf Hitler expressed confidence in the ability of non-German Axis units to protect German flanks, in reality these units relied on largely obsolete equipment and horse-drawn artillery, while in many cases the harsh treatment of enlisted personnel by officers caused poor morale. In regard to mechanization, the First Romanian Armored Division was equipped with around 100 Czech-built R-2 tanks, armed with a 37-millimeter (1.5 in) gun, ineffective against the armor of Soviet T-34 tanks. Similarly, their 37-millimeter (1.5 in) PaK anti-tank guns were also antiquated and they were largely short of ammunition. Only after repeated requests did the Germans send the Romanian units 75-millimeter (3.0 in) PaK guns; six per division. These units were extended over very large sections of front; for example, the Third Romanian Army occupied a line 140 kilometers (87 mi) long, while the Fourth Romanian Army protected a line no less than 270 kilometers (170 mi) long. The Italians and Hungarians were positioned at the Don, west of the Third Romanian Army.

Generally, German forces were in no better shape; they were weakened by months of fighting the Red Army, and, while Stavka raised new armies, the German high command attempted to maintain its existing mechanized units. Furthermore, during the course of the German offensive between May and November 1942, two motorized divisions, the elite Leibstandarte and the Großdeutschland, were redeployed from Army Group A to the West, to provide a mechanized reserve in case of an Allied landing in France. The Sixth Army had also suffered many casualties during the fighting in the city of Stalingrad proper. In some cases, such as that of the 22nd Panzer Division, their equipment was no better than that of the First Romanian Armored Division. German formations were also overextended along large stretches of front; the XI Army Corps, for example, had to defend a front around 100 kilometers (62 mi) long.

=== Soviet ===
The Red Army allocated an estimated 1,100,000 personnel, 804 tanks, 13,400 artillery pieces and over 1,000 aircraft for the upcoming offensive. Across the Third Romanian Army, the Soviets placed the redeployed 5th Tank Army, as well as the 21st and 65th Armies in order to penetrate and overrun the German flanks. The German southern flank was targeted by the Stalingrad Front's 51st and 57th Armies, led by the 13th and 4th Mechanized Corps; these would punch through the Fourth Romanian Army, in order to link up with the 5th Tank Army near the town of Kalach. In total, the Soviets had amassed 11 armies and various independent tank brigades and corps.

Preparations for the offensive were, however, far from perfect; on 8 November, Stavka issued orders to postpone the launch date of the operation, because transportation delays had prevented many units from being able to move into place. In the meantime, units at the front went through a number of war games to practice repelling an enemy counterattack and exploiting a breakthrough with mechanized forces. These movements were masked through a deception campaign by the Soviets, including the decrease of radio traffic, camouflage, operational security, using couriers for communication instead of radio, and active deception, such as increasing troop movements around Moscow. Troops were ordered to build defensive fortifications, to offer false impressions to the Germans, while fake bridges were put up to divert attention from the real bridges being built across the Don River. The Red Army also stepped up attacks against Army Group Center and set up dummy formations to maintain the idea of a main offensive against German forces in the center.

The Soviet Stalingrad Front forces were subject to heavy bombardment, making mobilization more difficult. The 38 engineer battalions allocated to the front were responsible for ferrying ammunition, personnel and tanks across the Volga River while carrying out minor reconnaissance along sections of the front which were to be the breakthrough points of the impending offensive. In three weeks the Red Army transported around 111,000 soldiers, 420 tanks and 556 artillery pieces across the Volga.

On 17 November Vasilevsky was recalled to Moscow, where he was shown a letter written to Stalin by General Volsky, commander of the 4th Mechanized Corps, who urged calling off the offensive. Volsky believed the offensive as planned was doomed to failure due to the state of the forces earmarked for the operation; he suggested postponing the offensive and redesigning it entirely. Many Soviet soldiers had not been issued with winter garments, and many died of frostbite, "due to the irresponsible attitude of commanders". Although Soviet intelligence made honest efforts to collect as much information as possible on the disposition of the Axis forces arrayed in front of them, there was not much information on the state of the German Sixth Army. Vasilevsky wanted to call off the offensive. The Soviet commanders, overruling Vasilevsky, agreed the offensive would not be called off, and Stalin personally rang Volsky, who reiterated his intention to carry out the operation if ordered to do so.

== Soviet offensive ==
Operation Uranus, postponed until 17 November, was again postponed for two days when Soviet General Georgy Zhukov was told the air units allotted to the operation were not ready; it was finally launched on 19 November. Shortly after 5 a.m. Lieutenant Gerhard Stöck, posted with the Romanian IV Army Corps on the Kletskaya sector called Sixth Army headquarters housed in Golubinsky, offering intelligence on a pending attack which would occur after 05:00 that morning; however, because his call had come in after five and false alarms were common during this time, the duty officer on the other end of the line was not keen on waking the Army Chief of Staff, General Arthur Schmidt. Although Soviet commanders suggested postponing the bombardment due to poor visibility from thick fog, front headquarters decided to proceed. At 07:20 Moscow time (05:20 German time) Soviet artillery commanders received the codeword "Siren", prompting an 80-minute artillery bombardment directed almost entirely against the non-German Axis units protecting the German flanks. At 07:30, the Katyusha rocket-launchers fired the first salvos and were soon joined by the 3,500 guns and mortars stretching along the few breakthrough sectors in front of the Third Romanian Army and the northern shoulder of the German Sixth Army's flank. Although thick fog prevented the Soviet artillery from correcting their aim, their weeks of preparation and ranging allowed them to lay down accurate fire on enemy positions along the front. The effect was devastating, as communication lines were breached, ammunition dumps destroyed and forward observation points shattered. Many Romanian personnel who survived the bombardment began to flee to the rear. Soviet heavy artillery aimed at Romanian artillery positions and second-echelon formations also caught the retreating Romanian soldiers.

=== Against the Third Romanian Army and the northern flank: 19 November ===
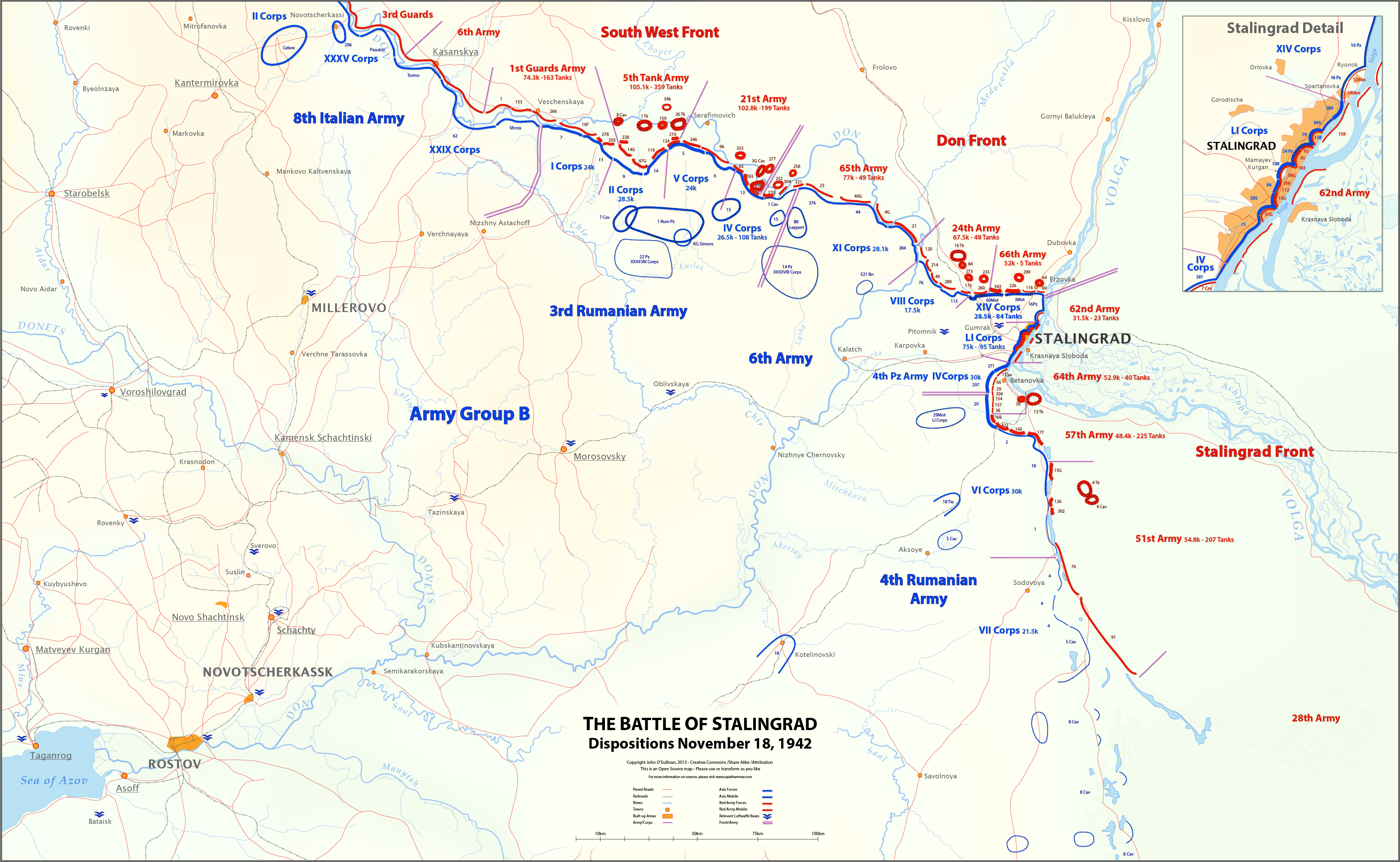
Unit locations of Axis and Soviet Armies on 18 Nov 1942.

The offensive against the Third Romanian Army began at 08:50, led by the 21st and 65th Soviet Armies and the 5th Tank Army. The first two assaults were repulsed by the Romanian defenders, and the effects of the heavy artillery bombardment had actually made it more difficult for Soviet armor to navigate through the minefields and terrain. However, the lack of heavy anti-tank artillery caused the Romanian defense to collapse; a breakthrough by the 4th Tank Corps and 3rd Guards Cavalry Corps was established by noon. Soon after, the 5th Tank Army was able to gain a breakthrough against the Second Romanian Corps, followed by the Eighth Cavalry Corps. As Soviet armor navigated through the thick fog by compass, overrunning Romanian and German artillery positions, three Romanian infantry divisions began to fall back in disarray; the Third Romanian Army had been outflanked to the west and east. After receiving the news of the Soviet attack, Sixth Army headquarters failed to order the 16th and 24th Panzer Divisions, hitherto engaged in Stalingrad, to reorient themselves to bolster the Romanian defenses; instead the task was given to the seriously understrength and poorly equipped 48th Panzer Corps.

The 48th Panzer Corps had fewer than 100 serviceable modern tanks. Furthermore, they lacked fuel, and the shortage of tanks forced commanders to organize tank crews into infantry companies; the 22nd Panzer Division, which formed part of the corps, was almost completely destroyed in the fighting that ensued. The 22nd had entered the fighting with fewer than thirty working tanks, and left with a company of tanks. The Romanian 1st Armored Division, attached to the 48th Panzer Corps, engaged the Soviet 26th Tank Corps after having lost communications with their German corps commanders, and were defeated by 20 November. As the Soviets continued to advance southwards, many Soviet tank crews began to suffer from the worsening blizzard, which affected men and equipment and blocked gunsights. It was not uncommon for tanks to lose traction and for crew members to break their arm from being tossed around inside the hull. However, the blizzard also neutralized the German corps' coordination.

The rout of the Third Romanian Army began by the end of 19 November. The Soviet 21st Army and 5th Tank Army captured 27,000 Romanians—the bulk of three divisions—and then continued their advance southwards. Soviet cavalry was used to exploit the breakthrough, sever communications between the Romanians and the Italian 8th Army, and to block any counterattack against the Soviet flank. While the Red Air Force strafed retreating Romanian soldiers, the Luftwaffe provided only negligible opposition. The withdrawal of the 1st Romanian Cavalry Division, originally positioned on the German 376th Infantry Division's flank, allowed the 65th Army to bypass German defenses. As German forces began to react late on 19 November, another attack was launched on the Sixth Army's southern flank.

=== Against the German southern flank: 20 November ===
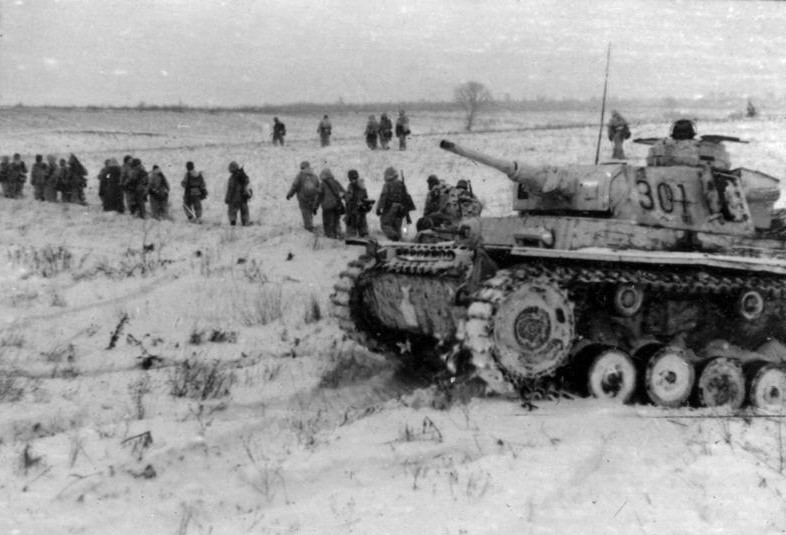
Panzer III in the southern Soviet Union, December 1942

In the early morning of 20 November, Stavka telephoned Stalingrad Front commander Andrei Yeremenko asking if he would begin his portion of the offensive on schedule, at 08:00. He responded he would do so only if the fog lifted; although the 51st Army opened its artillery barrage on time, because front headquarters could not contact the division, the rest of the forces prepared for the operation received orders to postpone the attack until 10:00. The 51st Army engaged the Romanian 6th Corps, taking many prisoners. As the 57th Army joined the attack at 10:00, the situation developed in such a way that the Stalingrad Front could throw its armored corps into battle. The German 297th Infantry Division watched, as its Romanian support failed to put up resistance against the Red Army. However, confusion and lack of control caused the Soviet 4th and 13th Mechanized Corps to stumble as they began to exploit the breakthroughs achieved by the opening offensive.

The Germans responded quickly by redeploying their only reserve in the area, the 29th Panzergrenadier Division. Despite initial victories against Soviet armored forces, the Romanian collapse forced the division to again redeploy in an attempt to shore up defenses to the south. The 29th Panzergrenadier Division's counterattack cost the Red Army around fifty tanks, and caused Soviet commanders to worry about the safety of their left flank. However, the German division's redeployment meant that by the end of the day, only the 6th Romanian Cavalry Regiment stood between advancing Soviet forces and the Don River.

=== Continued operations: 20–23 November ===

While the Stalingrad Front launched its offensive on 20 November, the 65th Soviet Army continued to apply pressure to the German 11th Corps along the northern shoulder of the Sixth Army's flank. The Red Army's 4th Tank Corps advanced beyond the German 11th Corps, while the 3rd Guards Cavalry Corps crashed into the German unit's rear. The German 376th Infantry Division and the Austrian 44th Infantry Division began to redeploy to face the enemy on their flanks, but were hindered by a shortage of fuel. The 14th Panzer Division's panzer regiment destroyed a flanking regiment of the Soviet 3rd Guards Cavalry Corps, but its anti-tank artillery suffered heavy casualties when it was overrun by Soviet forces. By the end of the day, the Soviet 1st Tank Corps was chasing the retreating 48th Panzer Corps, while the Soviet 26th Tank Corps had captured the town of Perelazovsky, almost 130 kilometers (81 mi) to the northwest of Stalingrad.

The Red Army's offensive continued on 21 November, with forces of the Stalingrad Front achieving penetrations of up to 50 kilometers (31 mi). By this time remaining Romanian units in the north were being destroyed in isolated battles, while the Red Army began to engage flanking portions of the German Fourth Panzer and Sixth Armies. The German 22nd Panzer Division, despite attempting a short counterattack, was reduced to little more than a tank company and forced to withdraw to the southwest. The Soviet 26th Tank Corps, having destroyed a large portion of the Romanian 1st Armored Division, continued its advance to the southeast, avoiding engaging the enemy left behind, although remnants of the Romanian 5th Corps were able to reorganize and put up a hastily constructed defense in the hope that it would be aided by the German 48th Panzer Corps. Surrounded by 5th Tank Army on one side and 21st Army on the other, the bulk of the 3rd Romanian Army was isolated in the region of Raspopinskaya where General Lascăr took control of the remnants of 4th and 5th Corps, whereas the neighboring 1st Armored Division was still trying to break free and link with 22nd Panzer Division. That day German General Friedrich Paulus, commander of the Sixth Army, received reports that the Soviets were less than 40 kilometers (25 mi) from his headquarters; furthermore, there were no remaining units which could contest the Soviet advance. In the south, after a brief halt, the Soviet 4th Mechanized Corps continued its advance north, removing German defenders from several towns in the area, towards Stalingrad. As German forces in and around Stalingrad were at risk, Hitler ordered German forces in the area to establish an "all-around defensive position" and designated forces between the Don and Volga rivers, as "Fortress Stalingrad", rather than allow the Sixth Army to attempt to break out. The Sixth Army, other Axis units, and most of the Fourth Panzer Army's German units were caught inside the growing Soviet encirclement. Only the 16th Panzergrenadier Division began to fight its way out. Lack of coordination between Soviet tanks and infantry as the Red Army's tank corps attempted to exploit the breakthrough along the Germans' southern flank allowed much of the Fourth Romanian Army to escape destruction.

On 22 November Soviet forces began to cross the Don River and continued their advance towards the town of Kalach-on-the-Don. German forces defending Kalach, mostly composed of maintenance and supply personnel, were not aware of the Soviet offensive until 21 November, and even then did not know in what strength the Red Army was approaching. The task of taking the bridge at Kalach was given to the Soviet 26th Tank Corps, which used two captured German tanks and a reconnaissance vehicle to approach it and fire on the guards. Soviet forces broke into the town by mid-morning and drove the defenders out, allowing themselves and the 4th Tank Corps to link up with the Red Army's 4th Mechanized Corps approaching from the south. Meanwhile, on a later date of Dec.13, the 26th Tank Corps split off southwards along the Liska river inlet in a small advance towards a bridge near the town of Nish Tschirskaya. The reason for the attack was not only to push the German forces away from the railroads leading to Stalingrad but to also cut the support provided to the German 6th Army still surrounded near the Don. The Russian forces had attacked the German positions with a bombardment from BM-13 Katyusha rocket launchers which were followed by a tank attack of mostly T-34s. The attack led to the retreat of the German forces in the area. The attack encirclement of German forces in Stalingrad was completed on 22 November 1942. That day Soviet formations also continued to fight pockets of Romanian resistance, such as that put up by the Romanian 5th Corps.

The encirclement of 6th Army was effective on 23 November. Around 16:00, near the village of Sovetsky, the forward detachments of the 36th Mechanized Brigade from the Stalingrad Front's 4th Mechanized Corps sighted the approaching tanks of 45th Brigade from the Southwestern Front's 4th Tank Corps. At first they mistook them for Germans because they did not fire green flares, as was agreed for a reconnaissance signal and several tanks were damaged in a short exchange of fire. After clarification the linkup was achieved. It was re-enacted later for the newsreels.

The junction between the armored troops of 21st and 51st Armies from Vatutin's and Yeremenko's fronts completed the surrounding of Paulus's group of forces: two German armies among the most powerful in the Heer, 22 divisions and 150 separate regiments or battalions, and an enormous amount of materiel. Never before in the war were so many troops of the German army caught together. Such a feat was so unusual that the Stavka's own initial estimation of the encircled enemy force was only a quarter of its actual strength, because besides the fighting troops there was a huge number of extra personnel from various professions, engineer sections, Luftwaffe ground staff and others. Fighting continued on 23 November as the Germans attempted in vain to mount local counterattacks to break the encirclement. By this time Axis personnel inside the encirclement moved east towards Stalingrad to avoid Soviet tanks, while those that managed to escape the encirclement moved west toward German and other Axis forces.

== Aftermath ==
Operation Uranus trapped between 250,000 and 300,000 Axis soldiers within an area stretching 50 kilometers (31 mi) from east to west and 40 kilometers (25 mi) north to south. The pocket contained four infantry corps, a panzer corps belonging to the Fourth Panzer and Sixth Armies, and surviving elements of two Romanian divisions, a Croatian infantry regiment and other specialist units. Trapped equipment included around 100 tanks, 2,000 artillery pieces and mortars and 10,000 trucks. The withdrawal to Stalingrad left lines of retreat littered with helmets, weapons and other equipment, and heavy equipment, which had been destroyed was left on the side of the road. Bridges spanning the Don River were jammed with traffic, as surviving Axis soldiers hastily made their way westwards in the cold weather, attempting to escape Soviet armor and infantry threatening to cut them off from Stalingrad. Many wounded Axis personnel were trampled, and many of those who attempted to cross the river on foot on the ice fell through and drowned. Hungry soldiers filled Russian villages scouring for supplies, while supply dumps were often looted in search of cans of food. The last stragglers crossed the Don River by 24 November, and demolished the bridges to seal off the Fourth Panzer and Sixth Armies from the Soviets in Stalingrad.

The Sixth Army, in the midst of chaos, began to build defensive lines, hampered by the lack of fuel, ammunition and rations, and further burdened by the advancing Russian winter. It was also tasked with plugging gaps in the line caused by the disintegrating Romanian forces. On 23 November, some German units destroyed or burned everything not necessary for a breakout operation and began to pull back towards the northern end of Stalingrad. However, after the Germans had abandoned their winter bunkers, the Soviet 62nd Army was able to destroy the German 94th Infantry Division on the open ground; survivors of the German division were attached to the 16th and 24th Panzer Divisions. Although German military commanders were of the opinion that the Heer forces caught in the encirclement should break out, between 23 and 24 November Hitler decided instead to hold the position and attempt to resupply the Sixth Army by air. The personnel trapped in Stalingrad would require at least 680 tonnes (750 short tons) of supplies per day, a task which the depleted Luftwaffe was in no condition to carry out. Furthermore, the revived Red Air Force was a threat to German aircraft attempting to fly over the encirclement. Although by December the Luftwaffe had assembled a fleet of around 500 aircraft, this was still insufficient to supply the Sixth Army and elements of the Fourth Panzer Army with the required supplies. During the first half of December the Sixth Army received less than 20% of their daily requirements.

In the meantime, the Red Army strengthened its outer encirclement with the intention of destroying the encircled German units. Soviet armies would attack German units to the east and the south, aiming to split German units into smaller groups. These orders became effective on 24 November, and were to be executed without a major regrouping or movement of reserves. The outer encirclement ran for an estimated 320 kilometers (200 mi), although only three-quarters of that distance was actually covered by Soviet troops; the distance between the outer and inner encirclements was around 16 kilometers (10 mi). The Soviet high command also began planning for Operation Saturn, which was aimed at destroying the Italian Eighth Army and cutting off German forces in the Caucasus. The Soviet Stavka planned Saturn to start on about 10 December.

German forces in the area had been further split up, as German general Erich von Manstein was given command of the newly created Army Group Don, comprising the German Fourth Panzer and Sixth Armies, and the Third and Fourth Romanian Armies. Although the situation looked bleak for the Germans, a moment of relative calm had settled after the end of Operation Uranus; German and Soviet forces were planning their next movements.

The link-up of the Soviet forces, not filmed at the time, was later re-enacted for a propaganda film which was shown worldwide.

== See also ==
- Romanian armies in the Battle of Stalingrad
- Operation Little Saturn
