= Romanian General Staff =

Emblem of the General Staff

The Romanian General Staff, officially the General Staff of Defence (Statul Major al Apărării) is the institution responsible for the leadership, organization and planning of the operations of the three branches of the Romanian Armed Forces: the Land Forces, the Naval Forces and the Air Force, subordinate to the Ministry of National Defense. It is led by the Chief of the Romanian General Staff, the professional head of the armed forces. It was established on 24 November 1859 as the General Staff and was renamed in 2018 under its current name.

== History ==
On 24 November 1859, the General Staff was established by order of Prince Alexandru Ioan Cuza. On 13 May 1865, the General Staff was temporarily dissolved, with its duties falling to Directorate I of the Ministry of War. In 1894, the General Staff ceases to be a department of the ministry and becomes a "special service" within it. On 28 April 1932, it was declared via law no. 125 that "The Army General Staff is the body through which the Ministry of National Defense directs, manages and controls the war preparation of the army." In July 1994, after the Romanian revolution, the Grand Staff received the name of the General Staff. In 2018, the General Staff becomes the General Staff of Defense.

== Structure ==
=== Directorates ===
- Personnel and Mobilisation Directorate
- Operations Directorate
- Logistics Directorate
- Strategic Planning Directorate
- Communications and Information Technology Directorate
- Training and Doctrine Directorate
- Infrastructure and Equipment Planning Directorate
- Medical Directorate

=== Service branches staffs ===
- Land Forces Staff
- Air Forces Staff
- Naval Forces Staff

=== International Delegations ===
- Military Delegation to NATO and the EU
- National Liaison Delegation at the Allied Command Transformation
- Delegation to the Supreme Headquarters Allied Powers Europe

=== Commands ===
- National Military Command Center
- Cyber-Defence Command
- Communications and Informatics Command
- Joint Forces Command
- Special Operations Forces Command
- Joint Logistics Command

== Subordinate organizations ==
- Military Technical Academy "Ferdinand I"
- National Defence University "Carol I"
- Defence Geospatial Information Agency
- Romanian National Military Archive
- National Military Museum "King Ferdinand"
- National Cataloguisation Bureau

== Leaders ==
Function	Rank	Name
Chief of the General Staff	General	Gheorghiță Vlad
Deputy Chief of the General Staff	Lieutenant General	Dragos-Dumitru Iacob
Deputy Chief of General Staff for Operations and Training	Lieutenant General	Julian Berdila
Deputy Chief of Defence Staff for Resources	Major General	Mircea Gologan
Deputy Chief of the General Staff for Planning	Major General	Adrian Brînza
Director of the Defense General Staff	Major General	Valentin Brînzei
Commanding Officer of the Defense General Staff	Adjutant Platoon Leader	Florea Sas
Head of the Personnel and Mobilization Department	Major General	Julian Daniliuc
Head of Operations Department	-	-
Head of Logistics Department	-	-
Head of the Strategic Planning Department	-	-
Head of the Communications and Information Technology Department	-	-
Head of the Training and Doctrine Directorate	Brigadier General	Ilie-Marian Dragomir
Head of the Structures and Endowment Planning Department	Brigadier General	Cornel Tonea-Bălan
