= Bucharest Garrison =

Military garrison

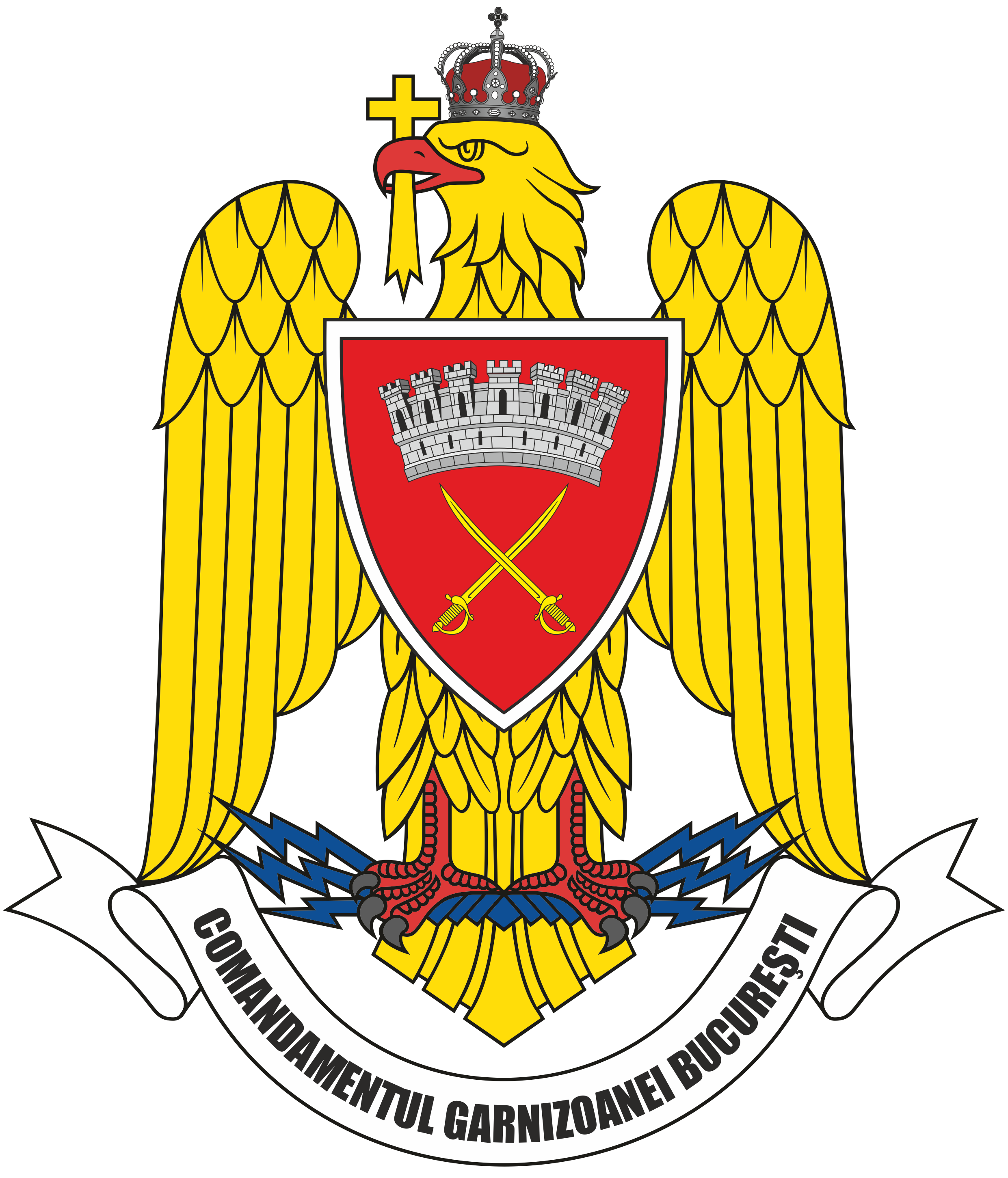
Official Insignia of the Bucharest Garrison

The Bucharest Garrison (Garnizoana București) is a military garrison located in Bucharest and subordinated to the Joint Logistics Command. The Garrison was initially formed in 1939 by a royal decree and in 1940 it became an independent army corps. After the end of the World War II, due to a Romanian – Soviet treaty as well as due to orders received from the Allied Control Commission, the garrison was disbanded.

In 2002, the Bucharest Garrison was re-established, with the 30th Honor Guard Regiment and the 265th Military Police Battalion being subordinated to it. However, these units were removed from the garrisons subordination in April 2006, when they were transferred under General Headquarters command, due to a reorganization process of the Romanian Land Forces. Today, some Battle Support battalions, a Public Relations office, the Special Military Commission, the Military Administrations offices and the Military Ceremonials Unit comprise the modern structure of the Bucharest Garrison.

From December 2007, the Bucharest Garrison is subordinated to the Joint Logistics Command.
