= Glina, Ilfov =

Glina
- Commune
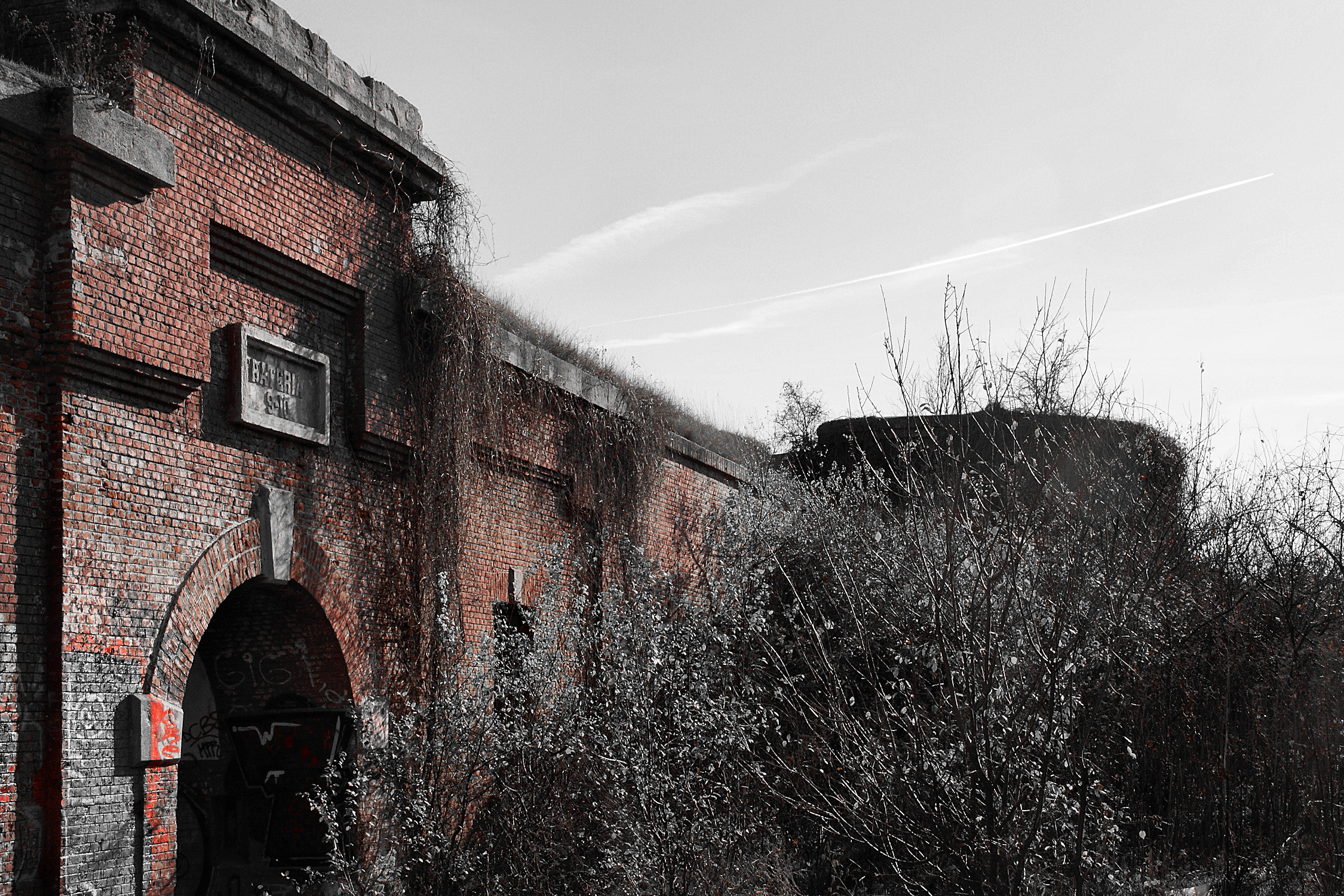
- Battery 9–10 in Cățelu

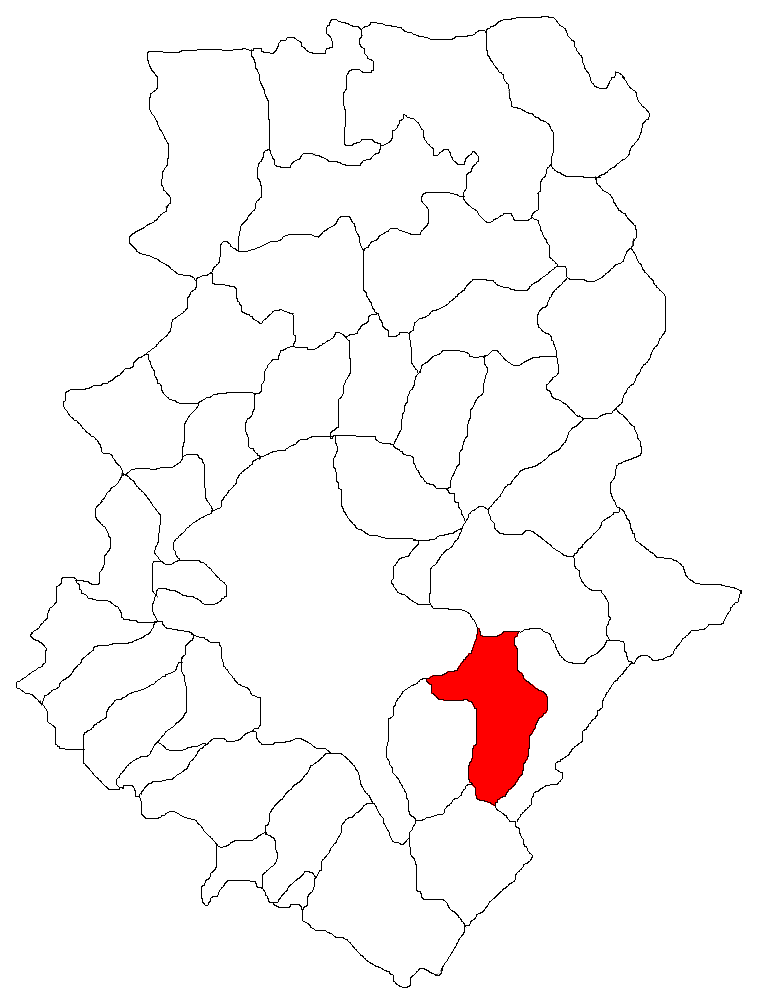
- Location in Ilfov County

- Location in Romania
- Coordinates: 44°23′N 26°15′E
- Country: Romania
- County: Ilfov

Government
  - Mayor (2024–2028): Ionuț-Răzvan Tudor (PNL)
- Area: 28.87 km^{2} (11.15 sq mi)
- Elevation: 67 m (220 ft)
- Population (2021-12-01): 9,209
  - Density: 319.0/km^{2} (826.2/sq mi)
- Time zone: UTC+02:00 (EET)
  - Summer (DST): UTC+03:00 (EEST)
- Postal code: 77105
- Area code: +40 x66
- Vehicle reg.: IF
- Website: primaria-glina.ro

Glina is a commune in the south-east of Ilfov County, Muntenia, Romania. Its name is derived from Slavic Glina, meaning "clay". It is composed of three villages: Cățelu, Glina, and Manolache.

The commune is the site of the Glina sewage treatment plant.

Cățelu is the site of Battery 9–10, the best known – and most visited – former military fort from a defensive circle of fortifications surrounding Bucharest that was built in the late 19th century, during the reign of King Carol I.

Historical population
Year	Pop.	±%
2002	7,147	—
2011	8,592	+20.2%
2021	9,209	+7.2%
Source: Census data
