= Deveselu Military Base =

Romanian NATO base

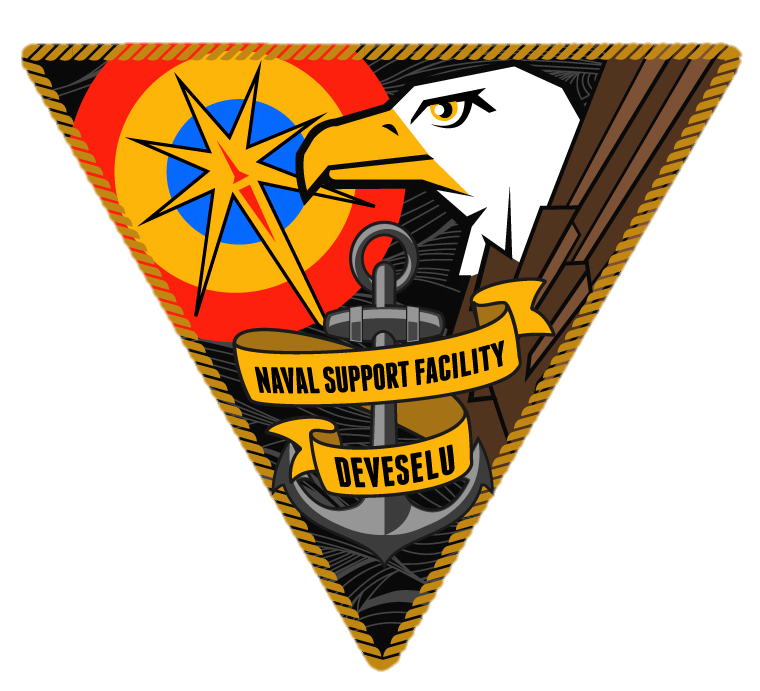
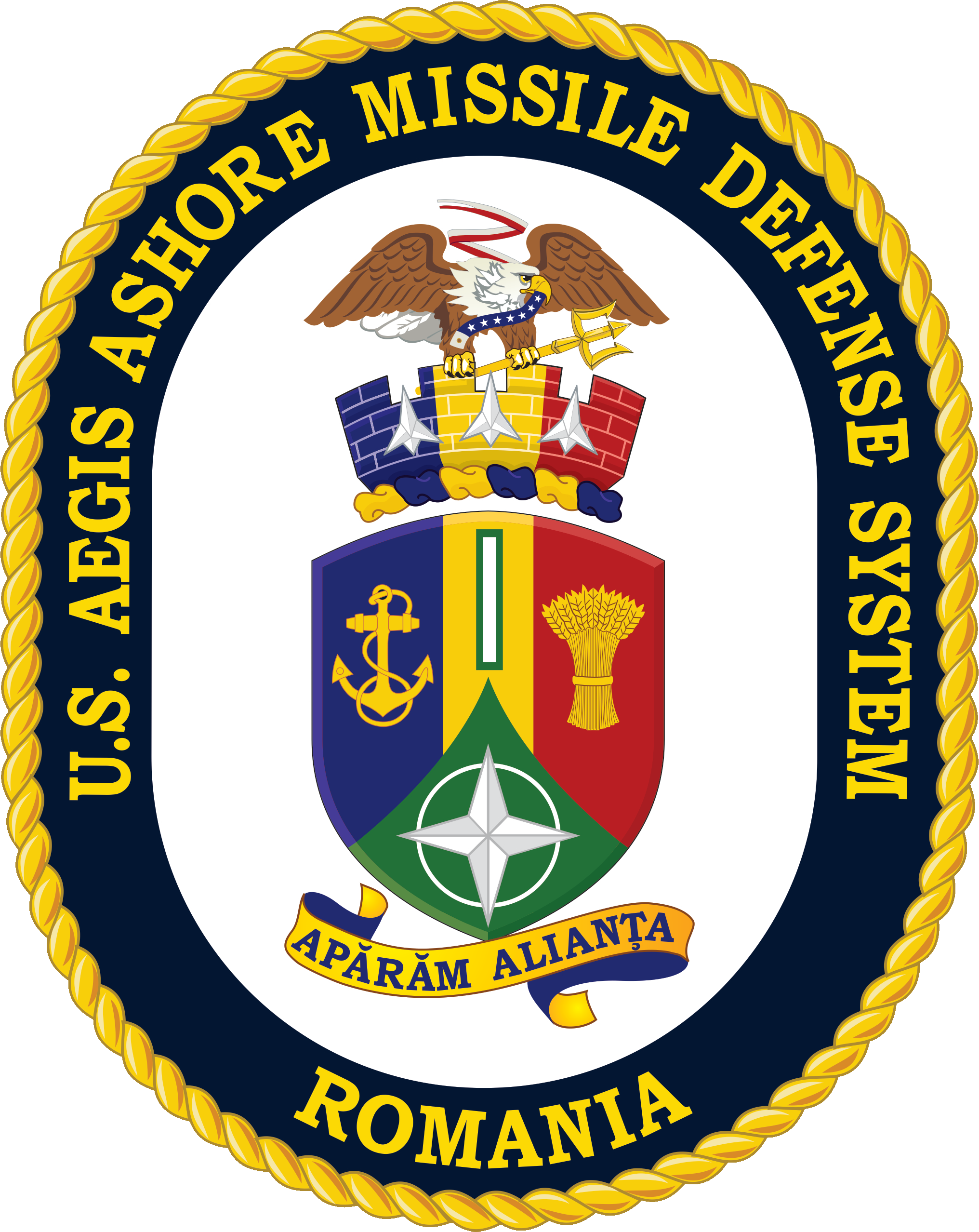
Deveselu Military Base
- Baza Militară Deveselu
- Deveselu; Near Caracal in Romania
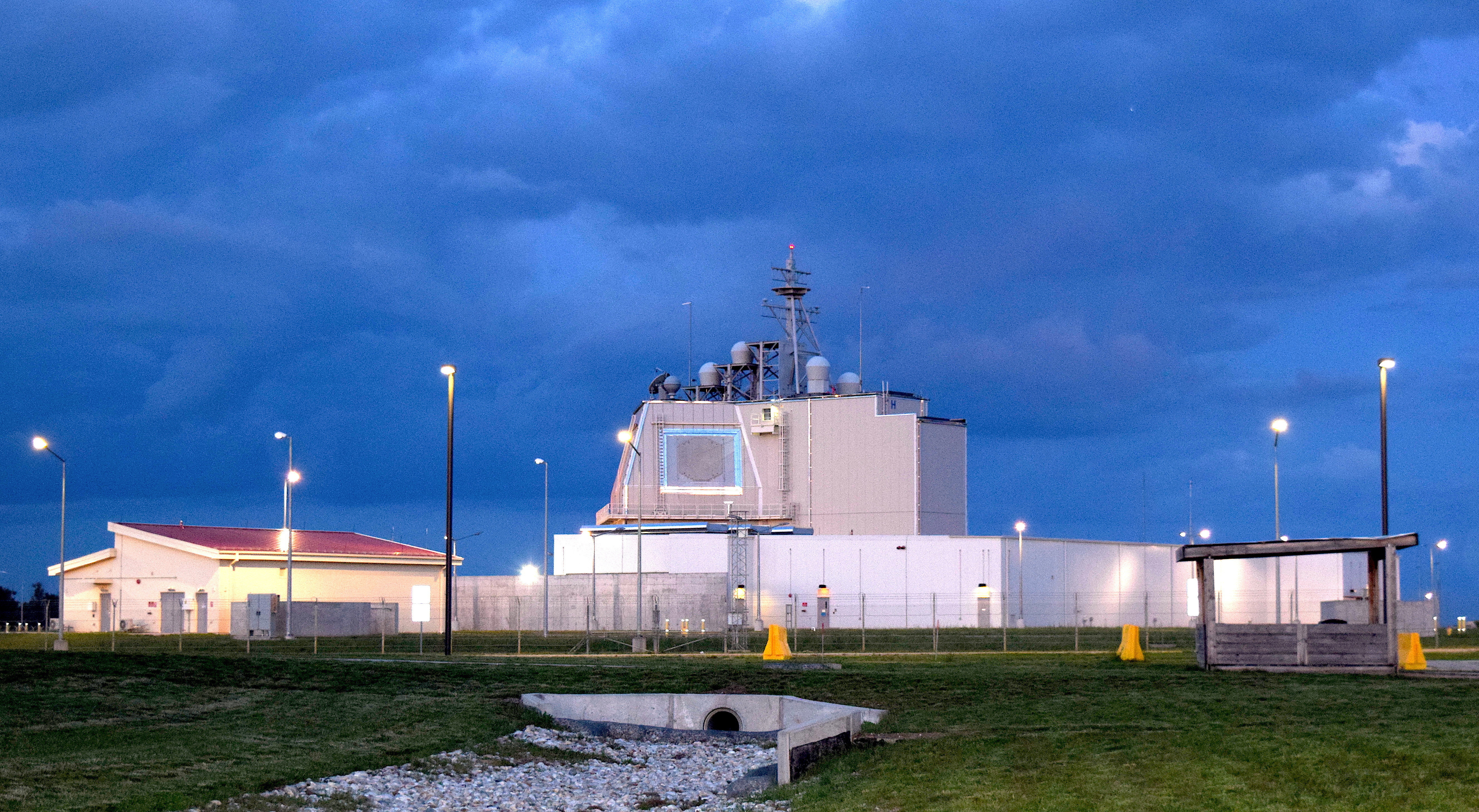
- Aegis Ashore Ballistic Missile Defense System

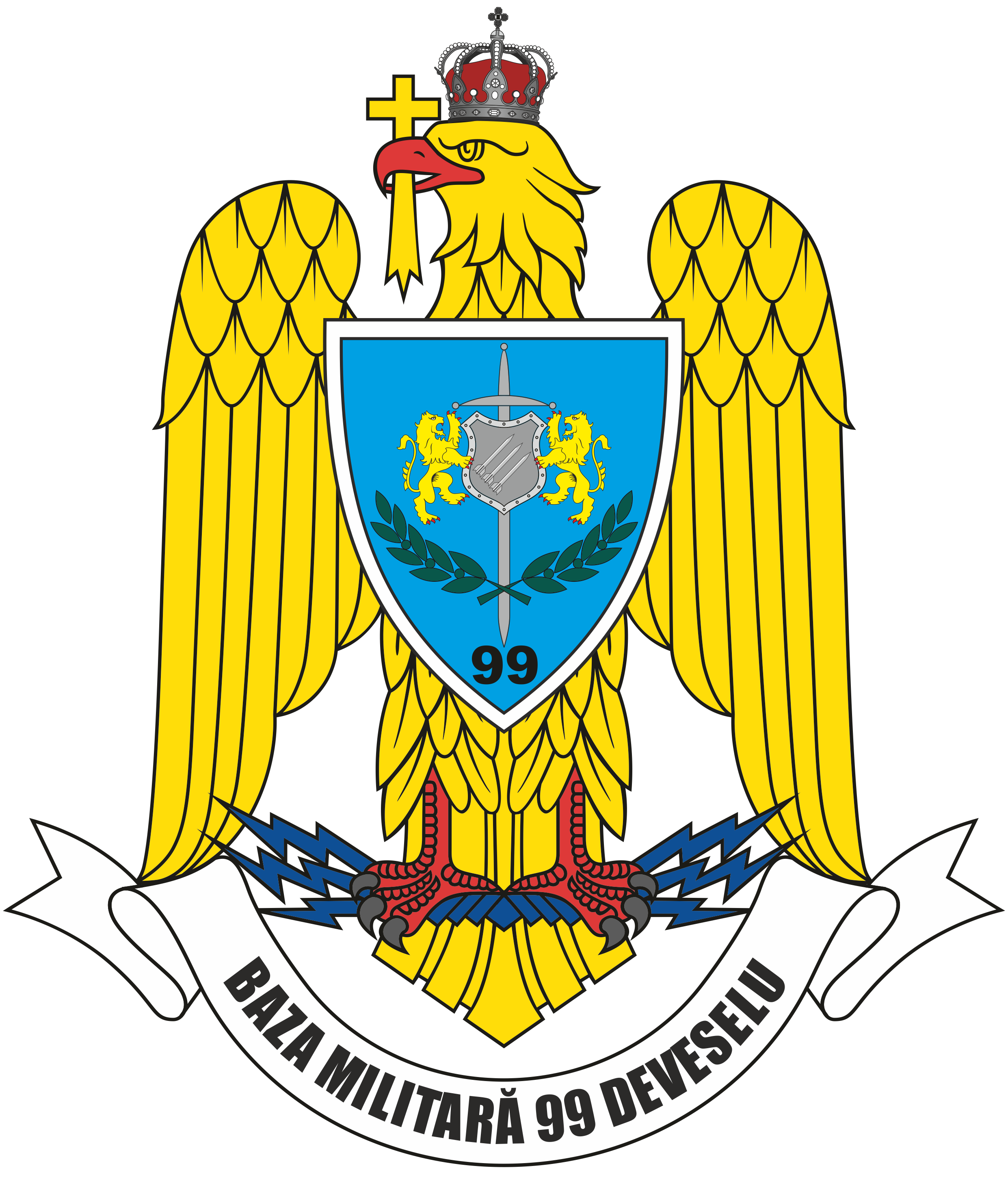
- Coat of Arms of the 99th Military Base

Site information
- Type: Ballistic Missile Defense System site
- Controlled by: Joint Logistics Command; United States Navy

Location
- Location within Romania Location within Europe
- Coordinates: 44°04′43.2″N 24°24′48.3″E
- Area: 900 hectares (2,200 acres; 3.5 sq mi)

Site history
- Built: 1952
- In use: 1952–2003; 2012–present

Garrison information
- Current commander: Lieutenant Colonel Georgel Marcu
- Past commanders: See Commanders
- Occupants: Naval Support Facility Deveselu; Aegis Ashore Defense System Romania

The 99th Military Base Deveselu (Baza Militară 99 Deveselu), or the Deveselu Military Base, is a Romanian NATO base hosting the United States Navy Aegis Ashore Ballistic Missile Defense System. The base consists of three military units: The Romanian 99th Military Base, which hosts two American bases: the Naval Support Facility Deveselu and the Aegis Ashore Defense System Romania. Located in Deveselu commune, Olt County, the base has an area of 900 ha (2,200 acres); of those, 170 ha (420 acres) are used by the U.S. forces.

The Deveselu base is operated by about 500 Romanian soldiers, 250 U.S. troops, and other personnel. The base is subordinated to the Romanian Joint Logistics Command. The current base commander is Lieutenant Colonel Georgel Marcu.

== History ==
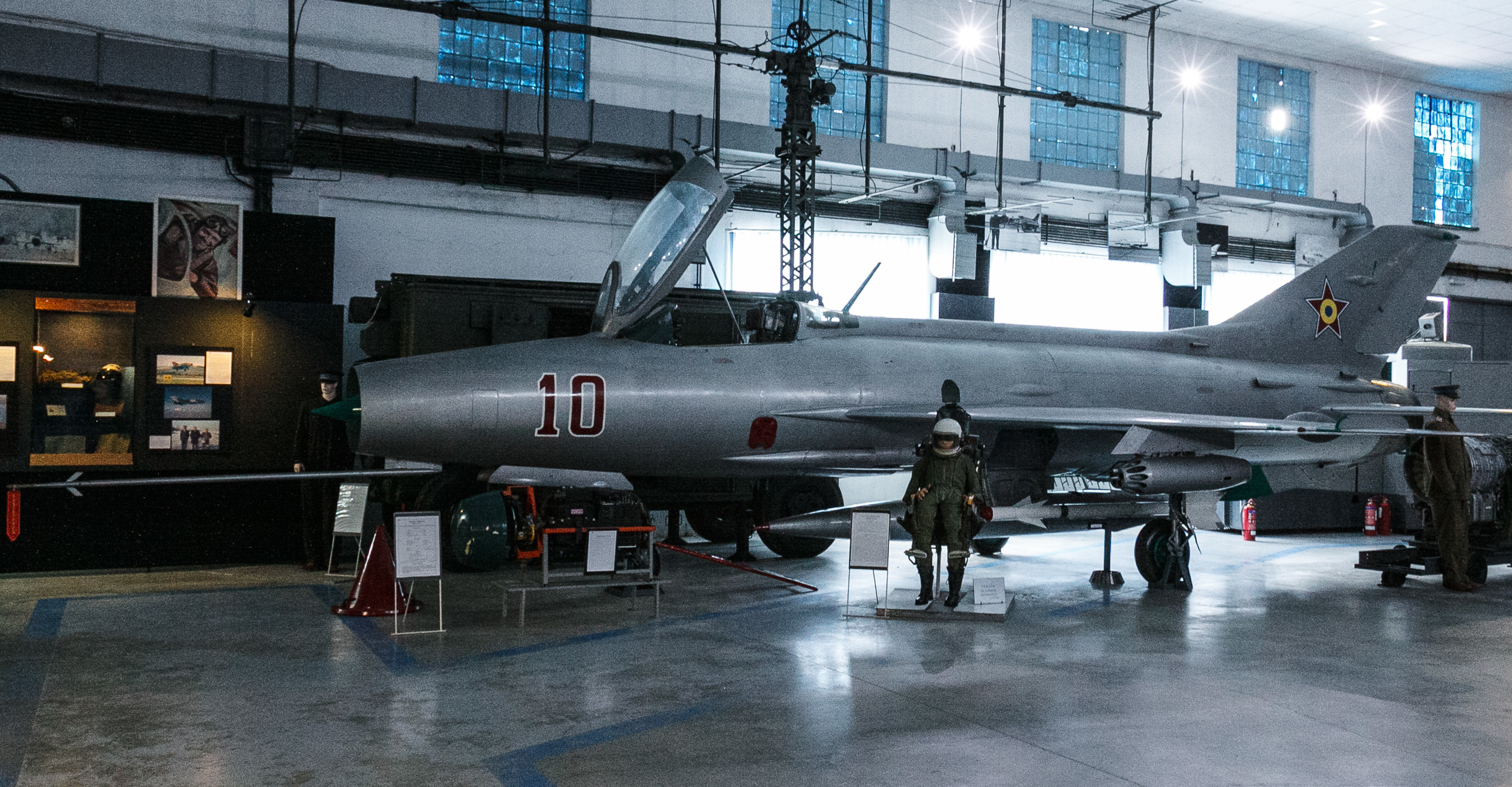
The first MiG-21F-13 based at Deveselu, displayed at the Romanian Aviation Museum

The construction of the Romanian Air Force base at Deveselu started in 1952, with assistance from the Soviet Union. The first supersonic flight with a MiG-19 happened at the base. It was also the first air base to receive MiG-21F-13 fighters in 1962, these aircraft equipping a squadron from the 91st Fighter Aviation Regiment (Regimentul 91 Aviație Vânătoare).

By the 1980s, the air base had become the most important one in Romania, housing four squadrons and 100 pilots. During the 1990s, it was the only air base in the country from where night missions were conducted. The base was disbanded in 2003 and approximately 200 personnel were retired.

=== 2010–present ===
In February 2010, the Supreme Council of National Defence decided for Romania to participate in the development of the American anti-missile defense component, at the invitation of President Barack Obama. A year later, in September 2011, the former aviation base was selected to host SM-3 interceptor missiles. Construction started in October 2013, with a ceremony attended by President Traian Băsescu and Under Secretary of Defense for Policy James N. Miller.

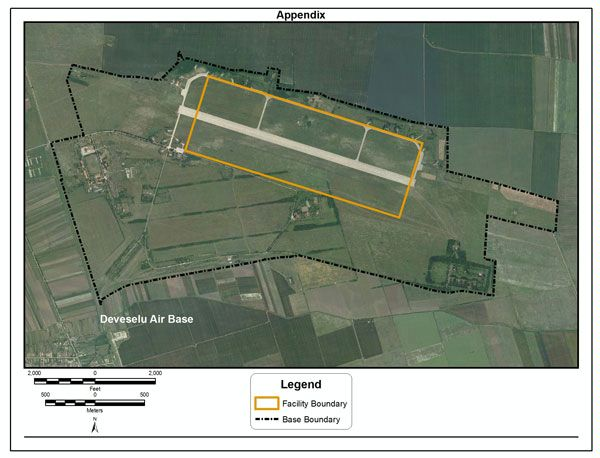
View of the air base in 2011

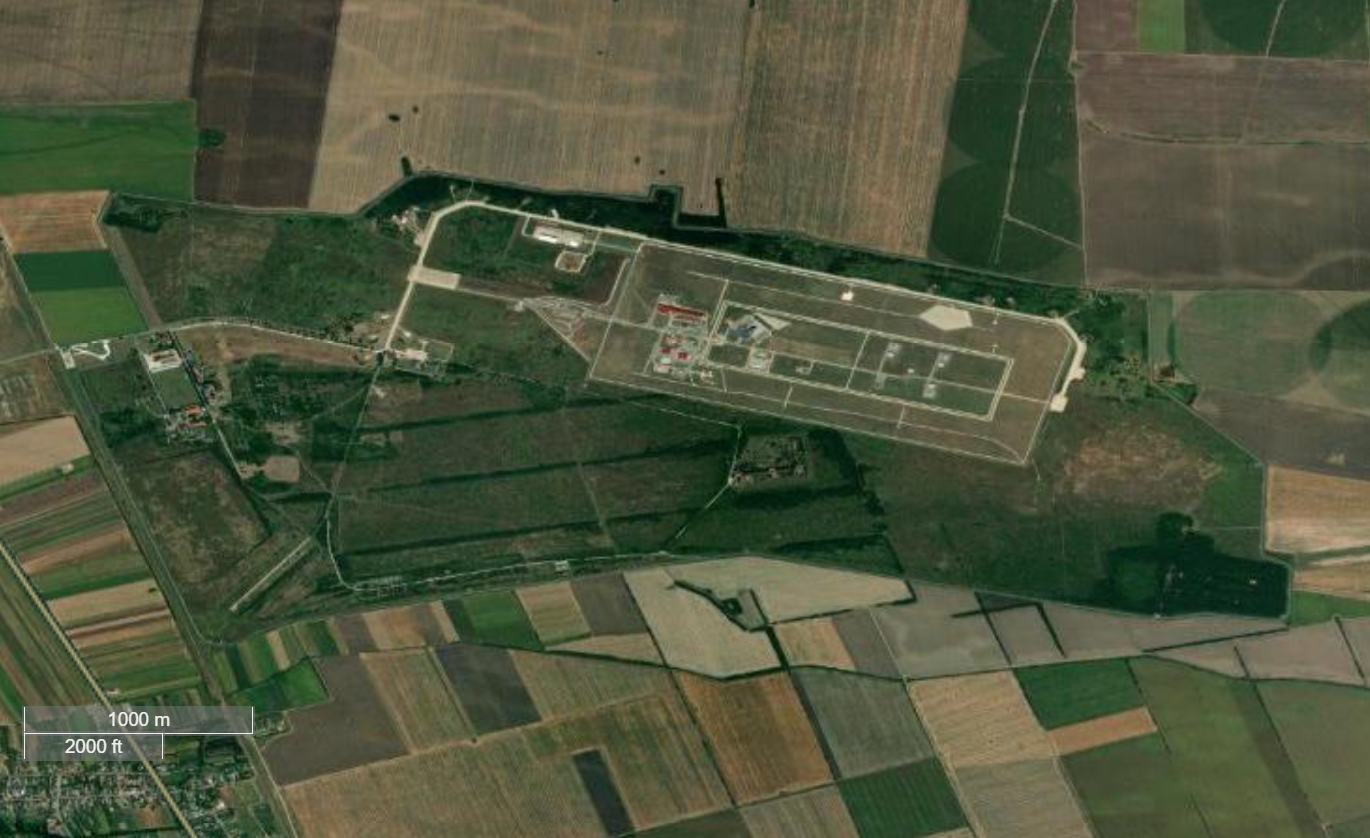
Satellite view of the current base

On 1 May 2012, Baza Militară 99 was established. The inauguration ceremony was held in December 2015. The Aegis Ashore Site became operational in May 2016. According to major general Charles Miller, "Aegis Ashore Romania is designed to protect European NATO Allies and U.S. deployed forces in the region against the growing threat posed by the proliferation of ballistic missiles outside the Euro-Atlantic area." The defense system is under the operational control of United States Naval Forces Europe-Africa, based in Naples, Italy. As of 2026, the commander of Aegis Ashore Romania is Cmdr. Carleigh Gregory, who replaced Cmdr. Robert Foster in December 2025.

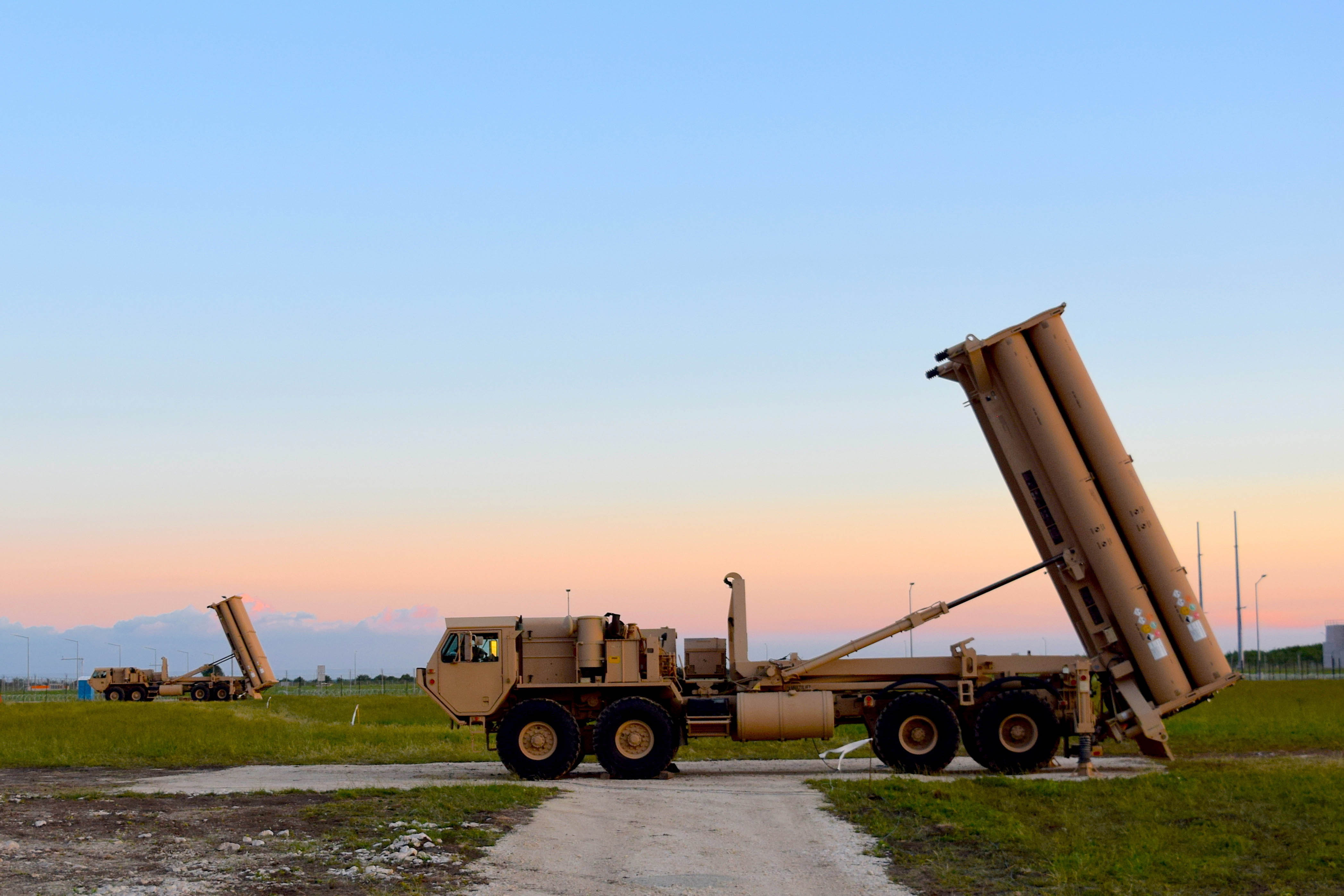
THAAD systems deployed at the base

In 2019, the system underwent an upgrade program. During the modernization works, the United States military temporarily installed Terminal High Altitude Area Defense (THAAD) systems at the base. After the completion of the upgrade process these systems were redeployed. This missile defense facility is designed to detect, track, engage, and destroy ballistic missiles in flight outside the atmosphere; it works in coordination with the four forward-deployed Europe naval forces' Aegis destroyers.

On 29 April 2022, the military colours of the 99th Military Base Deveselu were decorated with the Order of Military Virtue by General Daniel Petrescu at the 10th anniversary ceremony of its establishment.

The $800 million facility was originally intended to intercept incoming missiles from Iran, but has been deemed a "direct threat" by Russian officials. The Aegis Ashore missile defense system at Deveselu (and another one in Redzikowo, Poland), has been brought up by Russian President Vladimir Putin as an example of NATO's increasing influence in Eastern Europe.

== Capabilities ==
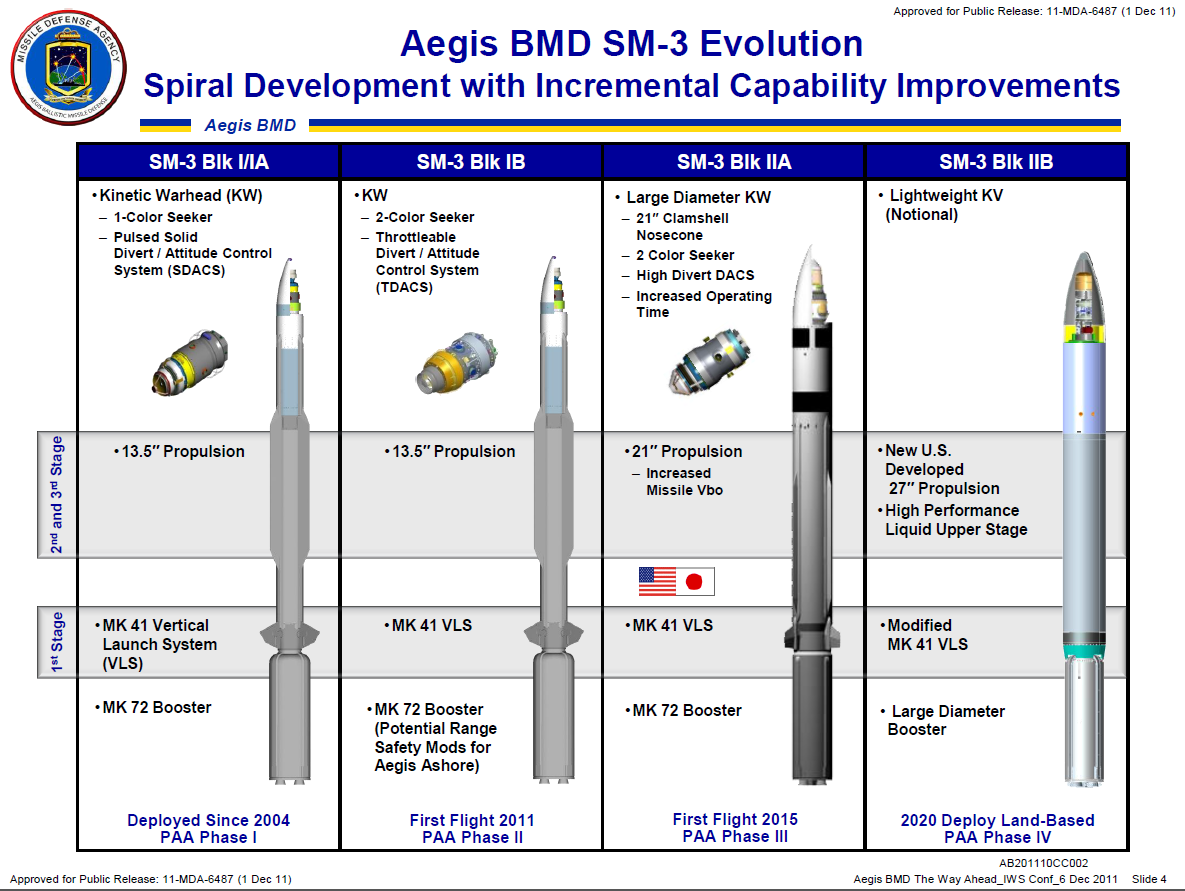
Aegis ballistic missile defense SM-3 evolution

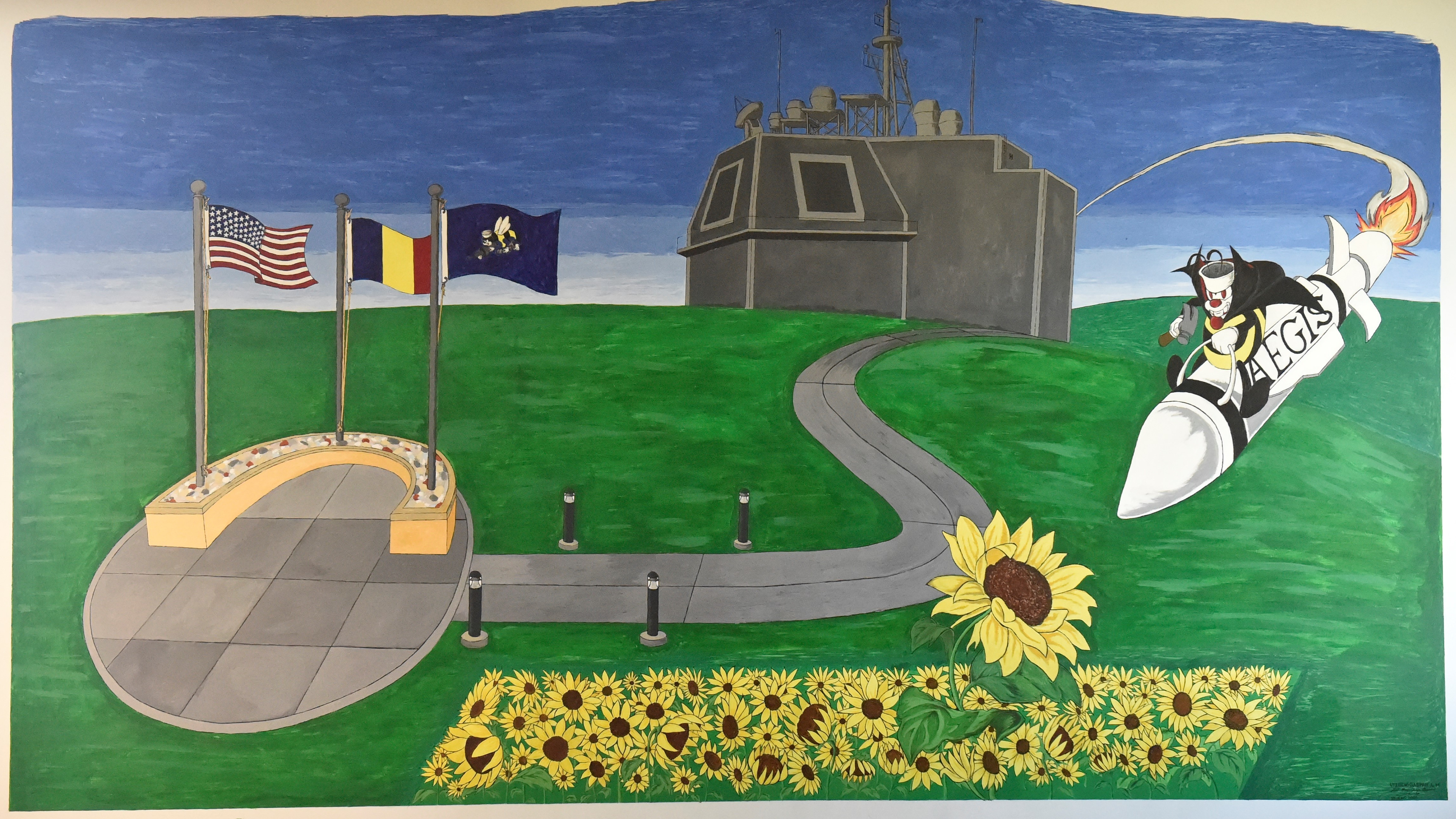
Mural in the Public Works Department Deveselu office featuring the Seabees mascot

Like the ship-based variant, the Aegis Ashore uses the AN/SPY-1 radar, as well as the same Command, Control, Communication, Computers and Intelligence (C4I) systems, computer processors, and Raytheon SM-3 missiles. In 2019, the Deveselu site has been upgraded to use the SM-3 Block IB interceptor. The Block IB offers enhanced capabilities in identifying and tracking targets compared to prior versions. The missile is capable of intercepting SRBMs, MRBMs and IRBMs targeting Europe. According to Commander John Fitzpatrick, as of 2019, there are 24 SM-3 ballistic missile interceptors at the facility mounted on Mark 41 Vertical Launch Systems. The same launchers can be used to fire a range of surface-to-air missiles and other offensive weapons, including Tomahawk cruise missiles, but the launchers at Deveselu had been "configured" and "installed" so that they can only launch SM-3 missiles.

In the wake of the 2022 Russian invasion of Ukraine, the Aegis Ashore Missile Defense Complex in Deveselu has assumed an essential role for the security of the NATO Alliance; the SM-3 interceptors have the capability to destroy slower, medium-range ballistic missiles with potential nuclear payload during mid-course flight, but probably would not work against hypersonic weapons according to Kingston Reif, Director for Disarmament and Threat Reduction Policy.

According to Russian sources, the Aegis Ashore base at Deveselu could be hit with Kinzhal hypersonic air-to-surface missiles, which would be able to "sweep away" the Aegis batteries with conventional warheads even before they could be put on alert. On the other hand, military experts such as Pavel Felgenhauer or James M. Acton do not consider that these hypersonic missiles offer a strategic advantage, or pose a significantly higher threat than conventional missiles.

Plans to further upgrade the Deveselu system were announced in 2023. Investments were made starting in 2024 and aimed at upgrading the detection sensors and facilities as well as replacing the missiles with newer ones, increasing the capability of intercepting more types of weapons. The funding was approved in 2024 and the project was scheduled to be completed in 2025. By 2026, the upgrade works were completed and the base is now equipped with Block IIA interceptors. These new interceptors add the capability of intercepting enemy ICBMs in exo-atmospheric space.

In March 2026, after Romania approved the temporary deployment of American aerial refueling airplanes on its territory in support of military operations against Iran, it was announced that the United States will deploy additional radar and satellite communications systems in the country to strengthen the European missile shield network.

== Nuclear weapons claims ==
It was reported in 2016 that over 20 American B61 nuclear bombs were moved from the Incirlik Air Base in Turkey to Deveselu after the failed Turkish coup. The rumors were denied by the Romanian Ministry of Foreign Affairs. Jeffrey Lewis, director of non-proliferation studies at the Middlebury Institute of International Studies, further added that the base does not possess the required WS3 vaults to store the weapons.

== Commanders ==
- Colonel Veronel Vavură (2012–2015)
- Comandor Răzvan Brătulescu (2015–2022)
- Colonel Marius Chiriță (2022–2024)
- Lieutenant Colonel Georgel Marcu (2024–present)

== See also ==
- Mihail Kogălniceanu Air Base
- NATO missile defence system
- Aegis Ballistic Missile Defense System
- United States missile defense complex in Poland
- List of American military installations
- Romania–United States relations
- Vin americanii!
