= Romanian Communications and Informatics Command =

Communications and Informatics Command
- Comandamentul Comunicațiilor și Informaticii
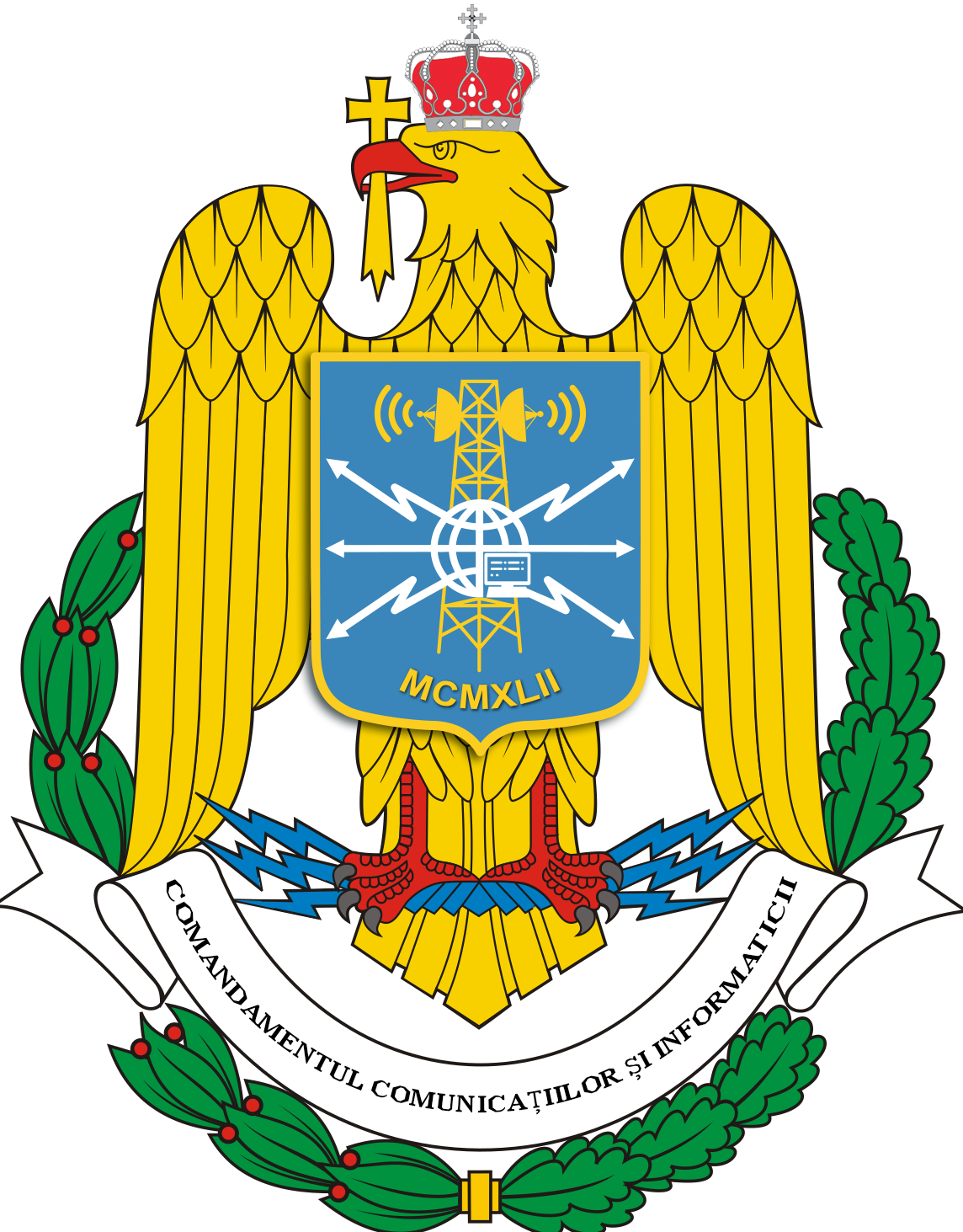
- Coat of arms of the Romanian Communications and Informatics Command
- Active: 1 July 1942 (as the Transmissions Command); 1 May 2006 (present form)
- Country: Romania
- Branch: Romanian Armed Forces
- Type: Military communications and IT command
- Garrison/HQ: Bucharest
- Website: cci.mapn.ro

Commanders
- Current commander: Colonel Iulian-Cătălin Spânu

Insignia
- Flag of the Romanian Communications and Informatics Command

The Romanian Communications and Informatics Command (Romanian: Comandamentul Comunicațiilor și Informaticii or CCI) is a command subordinated to the Defence General Staff ensuring the communications and IT services supporting the structures of the Romanian Armed Forces at the strategic and operational level, as well as in the educational field.

== History ==
=== Early telegraphy sections ===
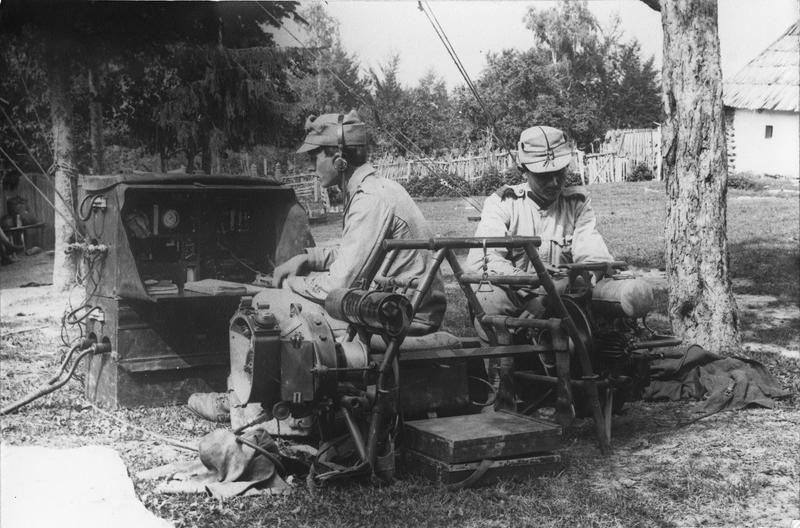
Wireless telegraph station in 1917

The first telegraph section of the Romanian Army was established on 14 July 1873. The section was part of the company of miners within the Engineer Battalion and was placed under the command of Captain Grigore Giosan. In 1874, the number of telegraph sections was increased to four, one for each engineer company. Organized as such, the telegraph sections participated in the Romanian War of Independence with 20 signalmen being decorated for their efforts.

With the experience gained during the initial part of the war, the four telegraph sections were merged into the 6th Telegraph Company on 19 October 1877. The company was placed under the direct command of the Army Headquarters and functioned for the remainder of the war, being disbanded on 1 October 1878, and the sections being redistributed within the Engineer Battalion.

The number of telegraph sections was increased with the establishment of the 2nd Engineer Regiment in 1880. By 1885, there were six mixed telegraph and railway companies. In 1886, these mixed telegraph and railway companies were separated, and, a year later, the telegraph companies were turned into mixed telegraph and sapper companies.

In 1893, the 1st Telegraph Company of the 1st Engineer Regiment was expanded to include a balloon section. Named the "Aerostation Section", it was equipped with a French spherical captive balloon and tasked with providing aerial surveillance in support of the troops defending the fortifications of Bucharest. The section was further equipped with a kite balloon in 1903. At the same time, the telegraph units were modernized with Marconi and Telefunken wireless telegraphy (telegrafie fără fir - TFF) equipment, motorcycles and automobiles. By 1909, a Specialties Company was established. Later, the company was expanded to a battalion comprising a TFF section, a projector section, an automobile and motorcycle section, a pigeon section, and a photography section. In 1913, the Aerostation Section was transformed into a company and transferred to the newly formed Aeronautics Service.

Somewhat ignored at the start of the First World War, the military transmissions arm proved vital during the conflict for accomplishing missions. As such, following the end of the war, the Specialties Battalion was transformed into a regiment with three battalions in 1919. The regiment was further renamed to the "Transmissions Regiment" in 1923. It was later transformed into the Transmissions Brigade in 1932 with the formation of two additional regiments. The units were headquartered in Bucharest, Câmpina and Brașov. During the interwar period, the transmissions units were equipped with foreign and locally produced equipment which included rapid telegraphs, teleprinters, and telephones.

=== Transmissions Command ===
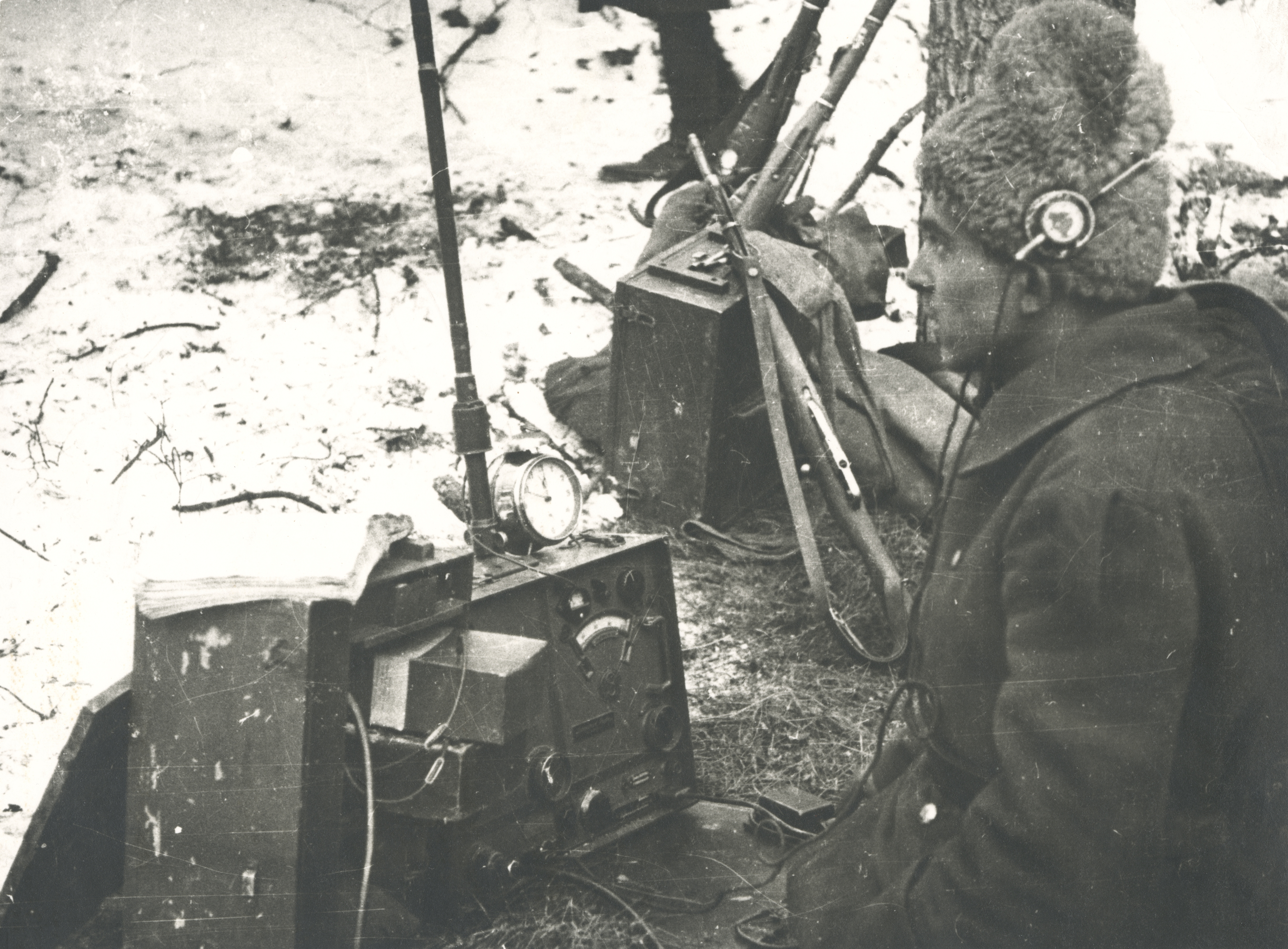
Signalman operating a radio in the Tatra Mountains, 1945

With the start of the Second World War, the transmissions units began to be reorganized. As such, on 1 July 1942, the Transmissions Command was established. The formation of the Transmissions Command marked the first time the transmissions arm was separated from the engineer branch. The signalmen of the Transmissions Command participated in all battles of Romania during the war, assisting all units from the army, navy, and air force. By 1944, there were around 10,000 to 13,000 signalmen in service throughout the Romanian military.

After the war, the transmissions branch was returned to the control of the engineers until February 1949, when the existing Transmissions Brigade was transformed into the Army Transmissions Command, renamed in 1951 to the Transmissions Troops Command (Comandamentul Trupelor de Transmisiuni). During this period, while the military transmissions underwent a process of Sovietization in order to align with the requirements of the Warsaw Pact, the equipment also continued modernization. With the development of the first Romanian computer in 1957 (the CIFA), the first informatics structure of the army was formed in the mid-1960s. In the 1970s and 1980s, the Transmissions Troops Command began implementing information technology across all daily activities related to commanding troops.

== Present day ==
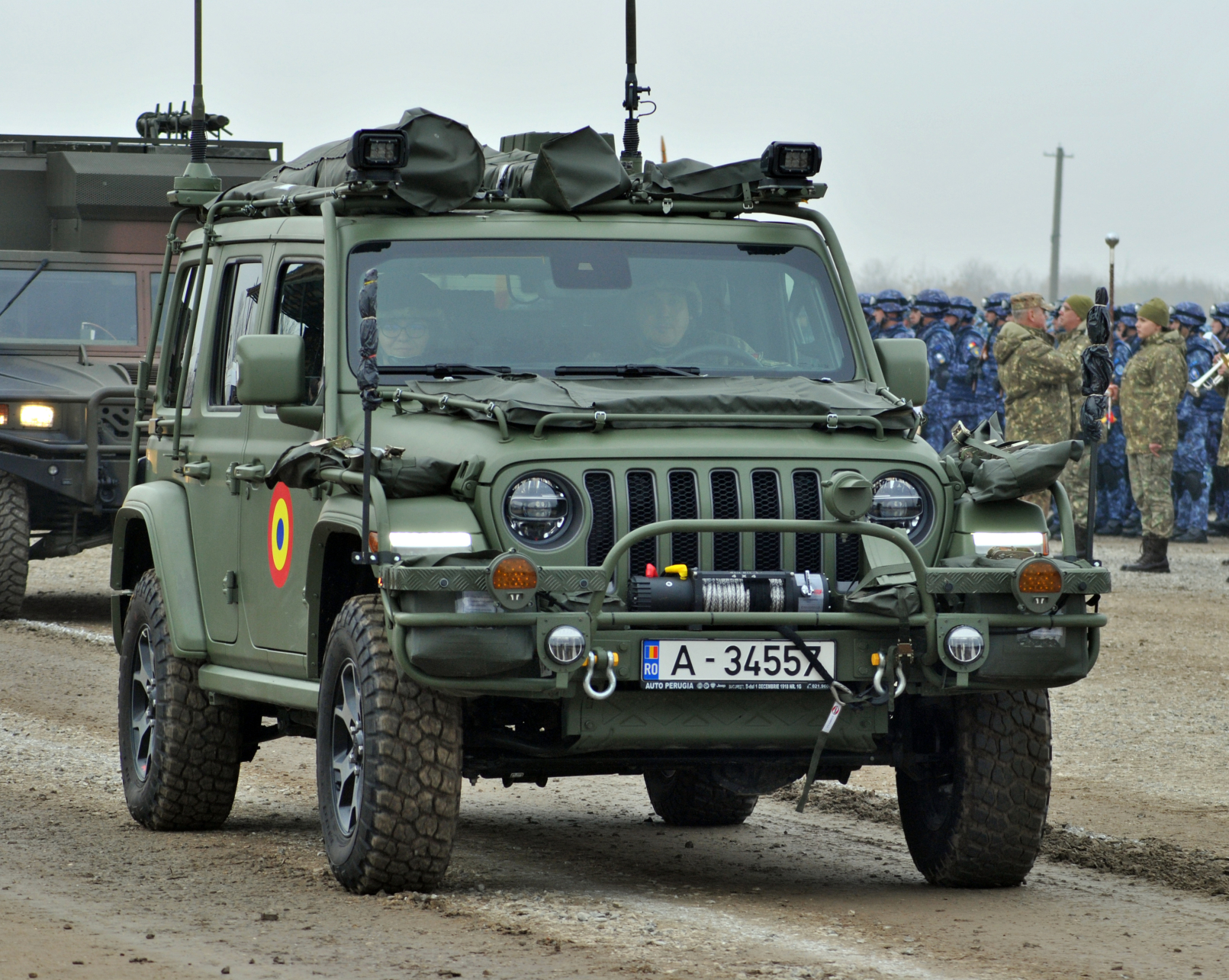
Jeep Wrangler radio special vehicle used by the CCI

After the 1989 revolution, the transmissions arm continued to extend its area of activity. On 30 October 1993, the Transmissions, Informatics and Electronics Command was established. This was followed by the establishment of the current Communications and Informatics Command on 1 May 2006.

=== Brigada 42 Comunicații și Tehnologia Informației ===
Established on 1 October 1972 as the 241st Transmissions Battalion, the 42nd Communications and Information Technology Brigade is headquartered in Râșnov. The unit's mission includes ensuring radio and satellite links and overseeing urban environment training.

=== Baza 48 Comunicații și Tehnologia Informației ===
The 48th Communications and Information Technology Base is headquartered in Bucharest, at Fort 3 Otopeni. The unit was first established as the 4th Transmissions Regiment on 10 January 1942.

As the 4th Regiment, the unit was based in Alexandria. It was composed of two transmissions battalions with four companies, two platoons and a transmissions column, with 1,096 soldiers in total. The regiment took part in operations on the Eastern Front, ensuring communications for the Third Army during the battles of Stalingrad, the Don Bend, and in the Caucasus. After the 23 August 1944, the 4th Regiment continued fighting in Transylvania, Hungary, and Czechoslovakia, ending its campaign in Brno. Returning to Romania, the regiment was relocated to Cluj as its original barracks had been damaged by the Red Army. The unit remained in Cluj for four years, then was moved to Vaslui, and finally to Bucharest in 1964.

In 1993, the 48th Base, then named the 48th Strategic Communications and Information Technology Center, began participating in international missions. First with the United Nations in Somalia, and later in the war of Afghanistan. On 1 August 2010, the Deployable Communications & Information Systems Module (DCM-E) was established as part of the unit and remains the only such Romanian NATO structure subordinated directly to SACEUR.

=== Baza 89 Comunicații și Tehnologia Informației ===
The 89th Strategic Communications and Information Technology Base was originally established as a transmissions battalion on 29 September 1948. Turned into a company as part of the 320th Guard Regiment in 1949, the unit was reorganized as the 923rd Transmissions Battalion in 1953. In 1959, the battalion received the name 89th Transmissions Battalion.

Since 1969, the headquarters of the unit have been located in Măgurele. In October 1990, the 80th Battalion was renamed to the 89th Main Transmission Center and, in April 2006, to the 89th Strategic Communications and Information Technology Center. The first international mission took place in 1993, when the 89th Center ensured the command and control of Romanian units deployed on UNOSOM II in Somalia. Other similar missions followed, such as UNAVEM III in Angola and IFOR in Bosnia and Herzegovina. Following Romania's entry into NATO, the 89th provided communication links for the Romanian troops deployed in various theatres of operation. The 89th Center also worked on the 2008 Bucharest NATO summit.

=== Baza 191 Logistică pentru Comunicații și Tehnologia Informației ===
The 191st Logistics for Communications and Information Technology Base was established in 1921 as the Arsenal of Technical Troops, located at Fort 2 Mogoșoaia. Initially, the arsenal consisted of 21 electrical workshops and an electric battery workshop. Since then, the Base changed its name several times, receiving the current designation in 1969 as the 191st Transmissions Equipment Repair Base. The current name of the base dates to 2019.

The primary mission of the 191st Base is to provide maintenance for the communications equipment and systems. Other missions include the research and development of new communications technologies.

=== Agenția Spațială și de Radiocomunicații ===
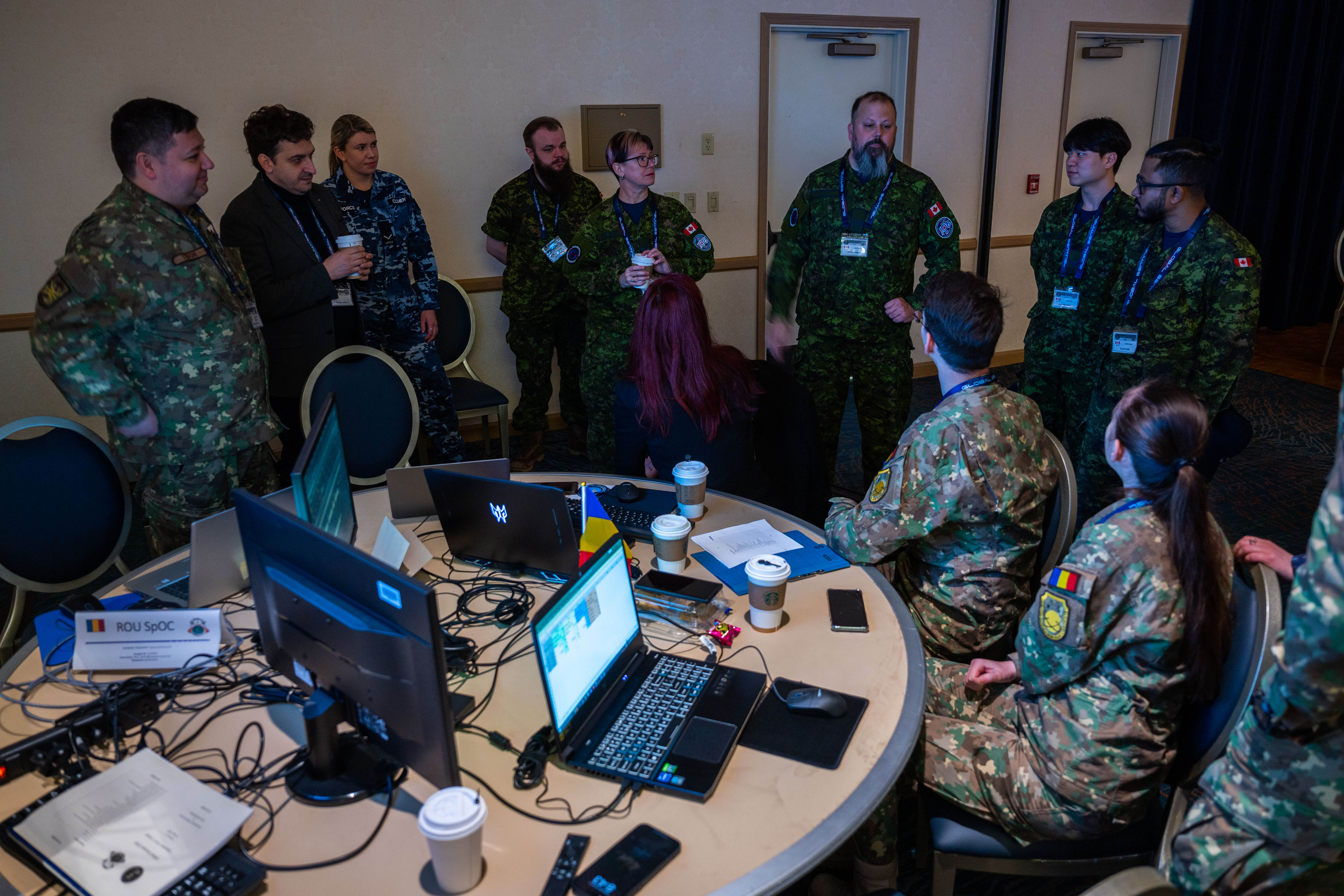
Personnel of the Agency at Vandenberg Space Force Base in 2024

The Space and Radiocommunications Agency was formed in 2021 after outer space was designated as a NATO operational domain. Its role is managing the Army's satellite communications. One of the Agency's projects was related to the establishment of the NATO Space Centre of Excellence from Toulouse, France.

== Structure ==
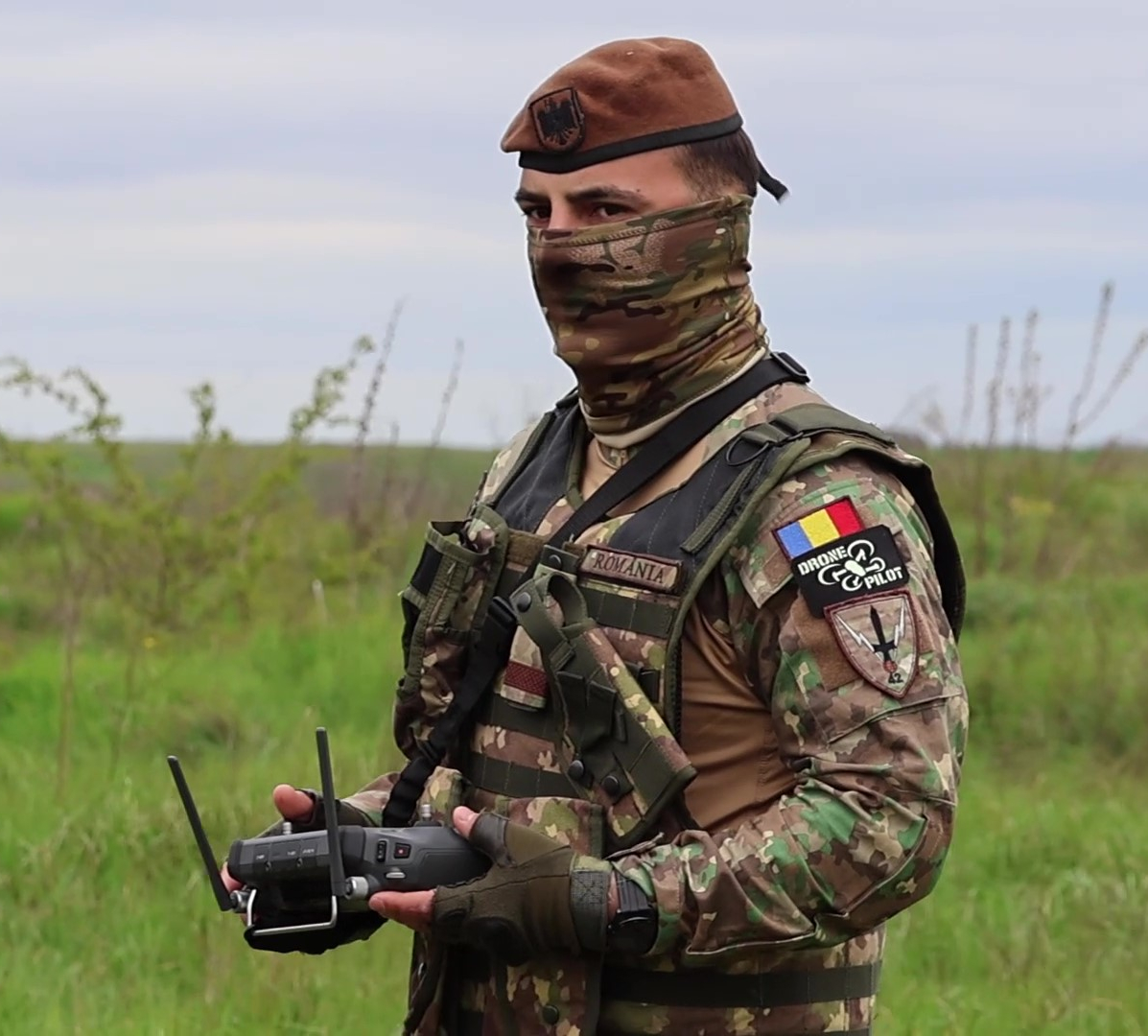
Drone operator of the 42nd Brigade during Eastern Phoenix 2026

The following structures are subordinated to the Communications and Informatics Command:

- Agency for Management and Development of C4ISR Systems, in Bucharest
- Space and Radiocommunications Agency, in Bucharest
- 42nd Communications and Information Technology Brigade "Divisional General Traian Moșoiu", in Râșnov
  - 54th CTI Battalion, in Oradea
  - 105th CTI Battalion, in Târgu Cărbunești
  - 115th CTI Battalion, in Bacău
  - 346th CTI Battalion, in Sebeș
  - 421st CTI Battalion, in Râșnov
  - 423rd Support Battalion, in Râșnov
  - 424th Multifunctional Drone Company, in Râșnov
- 48th Communications and Information Technology Base, in Bucharest
  - DCM "E" - 2nd NATO Signal Battalion (2NSB)
- 89th Strategic Communications and Information Technology Base, in Bucharest
  - 1st Regional Management Communications Hub Center, in Sibiu
  - 3rd Locally Managed Communications Center
  - Communications and Information Technology Company (M-100)
    - Telephone Network Administration Center
  - Main Communications Center
  - Main Satellite Access Center, in Vârteju
  - Logistics Company
- 191st Logistics for Communications and Information Technology Base, in Bucharest
  - 192nd Maintenance Center
  - 193rd Storage and Transit Center
  - 194th Design and Manufacturing of Smart Technologies and Equipment Center
  - Security and Military Police Battalion
  - Transport and Logistic Support Battalion
- Training School for Communications, Information Technology and Cyber Defense, in Sibiu
- Military School of Military Master Sergeants and Non-Commissioned Officers for Communications, Information Technology and Cyber Defense, in Sibiu
- "Tudor Vladimirescu" National Military College, in Craiova

== Bibliography ==
- Bălășescu, Sorin-Silviu (2018). "Centrul 42 Comunicații și Informatică de Sprijin". Revista comunicațiilor și informaticii (in Romanian). No. 1/2018. Centrul Tehnic Editorial al Armatei. ISSN 1841-0758.
- Ciubotariu, Constantin (2018). "Centrul 48 Comunicații și Informatică Strategice". Revista comunicațiilor și informaticii (in Romanian). No. 1/2018. Centrul Tehnic Editorial al Armatei. ISSN 1841-0758.
- Vătafu, Adrian (2018). "Centrul 89 Comunicații și Informatică Principal". Revista comunicațiilor și informaticii (in Romanian). No. 1/2018. Centrul Tehnic Editorial al Armatei. ISSN 1841-0758.
- Gușu, Florin (2018). "Baza 191 Logistică pentru Comunicații și Tehnologia Informației". Revista comunicațiilor și informaticii (in Romanian). No. 1/2018. Centrul Tehnic Editorial al Armatei. ISSN 1841-0758.
