= Romanian Joint Logistics Command =

- Comandamentul Logistic Întrunit
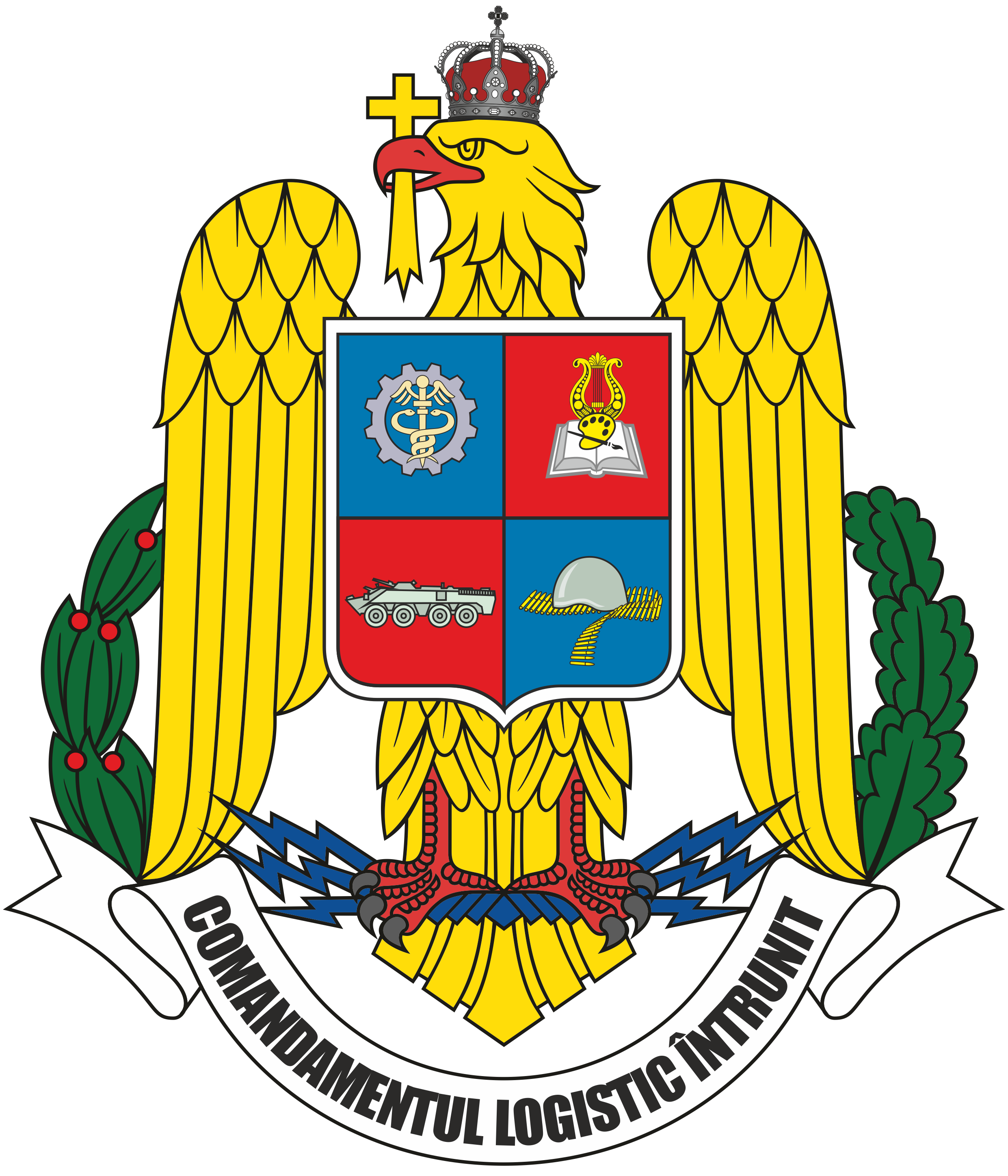
- Coat of arms of the Romanian Joint Logistics Command
- Country: Romania
- Branch: Romanian Armed Forces
- Type: Military logistics command
- Garrison/HQ: Bucharest
- Engagements: War in Afghanistan
- Website: logmil.ro

Commanders
- Current commander: Major General Iulian Daniliuc

Insignia
- Flag of the Romanian Joint Logistics Command

The Romanian Joint Logistics Command (Romanian: Comandamentul Logistic Întrunit or CLÎ) is a command subordinated to the Romanian Armed Forces with the main mission to ensure the logistical support of the military forces on the national territory, as well as the troops in the theaters of operations.

== History ==
The Joint Logistics Command received its battle flag during a ceremony held on 15 September 2011. On 1 February 2007, the Movement Coordination Center merged with the Military Transport Section and was subordinated to the Logistics Command. In December 2007, the Bucharest Garrison was also placed under the command of the CLÎ.

Logistic support elements of the Logistics Command participated in missions in support of the troop deployments to Afghanistan. The CLÎ also helped combat the COVID-19 pandemic by producing protective visors with the 122nd Logistics Brigade and the 1st Territorial Logistics Base.

== Role ==
The Joint Logistics Command provides logistical operational support and general support needed for combat and combat support structures. The performed missions by the subordinated structures of the Joint Logistics Command include: supply, services campaign, maintenance, movement and transport, and support for reception, staging and movement.

== Structure ==
The Joint Logistics Command has the following subordinated structures:

- Military bases
  - 1st Territorial Logistics Base "Carpatica" in Târgoviște
    - 167th Armament Depot "General de brigadă Gheorghe Manu" in Târgoviște
    - 185th Maintenance Center "Radu cel Mare" in Târgoviște
    - 921st Support Battalion "Vlad Țepeș" in Târgoviște
    - 923rd Transport Battalion "Matei Basarab" in Târgoviște
    - Records and Storage Sector in Buda
  - 2nd Territorial Logistics Base "Șelimbăr" in Sibiu
    - 92nd Engineer Depot "Baraolt" in Arcuș
    - 106th Central Ammunition Depot "Țara Bârsei" in Apața
    - 183rd Maintenance Center "Cibinum" in Sibiu
    - 197th Ammunition Depot in Brețcu
    - 373rd Zonal Storage Center in Roman
    - 941st Support Battalion "Cedonia" in Sibiu
    - Military Training, Representation and Transit Complex "Munte" in Sinaia
  - 3rd Territorial Logistics Base "Black Sea" in Mangalia
    - 2× Military Transportation Offices
    - Logistic Support Company
    - Railway Boarding and Disembarkation Detachment
    - Movement Control Team (MCT)
    - Central Depot
    - Mixed and Zonal Depots
      - 316th Mixed Depot "Histria" in Murfatlar
      - Mixed Depot in Victoria
      - Mixed Depot in Nicolae Bălcescu
    - Military Training, Representation and Transit Complex "Litoral" in Mangalia
  - 9th Logistics Base in Bucharest
    - 123rd Logistic Support Battalion
  - 99th Military Base Deveselu in Deveselu
    - Engineer General Support Company
    - Logistic Support Company
    - Military Police Company
    - Garrison Military Dormitory in Caracal
    - Transit and Accommodation Cultural Center
  - 122nd Logistic Support Brigade "Muntenia" in Bucharest
    - 121st Materiel Transport Battalion
    - 124th Personnel Transport Battalion
    - 125th Maintenance Center
    - 126th Reception, Staging, Onward Movement and Theater of Operations Support Base in Tunari
      - 2× Boarding and Disembarkation Detachments
      - Logistic Support Center
      - Deployable Convoy Support Center
      - Railway Operations Management Team
    - 127th Logistic Support Battalion
    - 174th Mixed Depot
  - 485th Communication and Informatics Center
- Education and training
  - Military College "Dimitrie Cantemir" in Breaza
  - Logistics Personnel Training Base in Chitila
  - Military Music Training Center
  - Preschool Complex of the Ministry of National Defence
  - National Military Library
  - Military Publishing House
  - Army Testing Ground "General de divizie Ștefan Burileanu" in Jegălia
  - Army Artillery Laboratory in Cernica
  - Logistics Materials and Ammunition Testing, Experimentation, Analysis, Reception Center
    - Garment Production Sector
    - Logistics Materials Testing Sector
      - Food Testing Laboratory
      - Fuel-Lubricant Testing Laboratory
- Culture and traditions
  - King Ferdinand I National Military Museum
  - General Inspectorate of Military Music
  - National Military Circle
- Other structures
  - Bucharest Garrison
  - Movement Coordination Center
  - National Codification Office
  - Barracks Maintenance, Repair and Operation Center
  - Ministry of National Defence Accommodation-Transit and Representation Center
  - Production and Representation Services Center
    - Service Company
    - Transport Company
    - Transport-Representation Company
