= Fortifications of Bucharest =

Structures in the Romanian capital

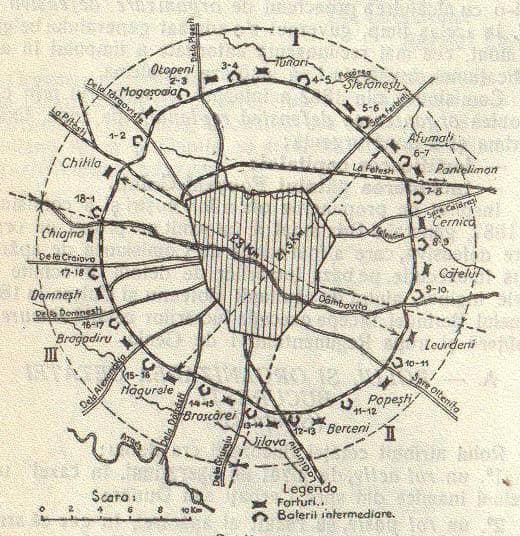
Map of the Bucharest fortress

The fortifications of Bucharest are a ring of thirty six fortifications (18 forts and 18 batteries) built in the late 19th century that surround Bucharest, the capital of Romania.

A report by the War Ministry led the celebrated Belgian military architect Henri Alexis Brialmont (who made several visits to Bucharest, meeting with King Carol I in the process) to draft a plan for the city's fortifications, with construction beginning in 1884. The forts, about 4km apart, cost 111.5 million gold lei (the equivalent of 614 mil euro of today, of which only 15 million were initially allocated), or three times the annual army budget.

The forts took over two decades to build, and work was quite complex; the walls are two metres thick in places. All eighteen forts were linked by a road and a railway, which today is DN100, Bucharest's ring road. Eighteen subterranean batteries were placed between the forts, and the fortification ring included some 240 pieces of artillery in all.

Romania, which had recently won its independence from the Ottoman Empire, undertook this enormous effort in order to keep up with the prevailing military doctrine of the day, which pertained that the capital city should be defended at all costs. In case of invasion, Bucharest was to be the point of retreat, but also the place where significant military operations would begin, spreading from the Danube to the Carpathians.

At the beginning of the 20th century, chemical and aeronautical advances rendered the forts obsolete soon after their completion. Explosives and aerial bombardment made classical fortifications useless in modern warfare. In 1914, the Battle of Liège, in which the German Army broke through fortifications also designed by Brialmont with greater ease than expected, alarmed the authorities in Bucharest. The forts' artillery pieces—all top-notch Krupp cannons—were quickly dismantled and transformed into mobile artillery. By 1916, when the German Army was approaching Bucharest, the forts had already been abandoned, and the city was taken without much difficulty.

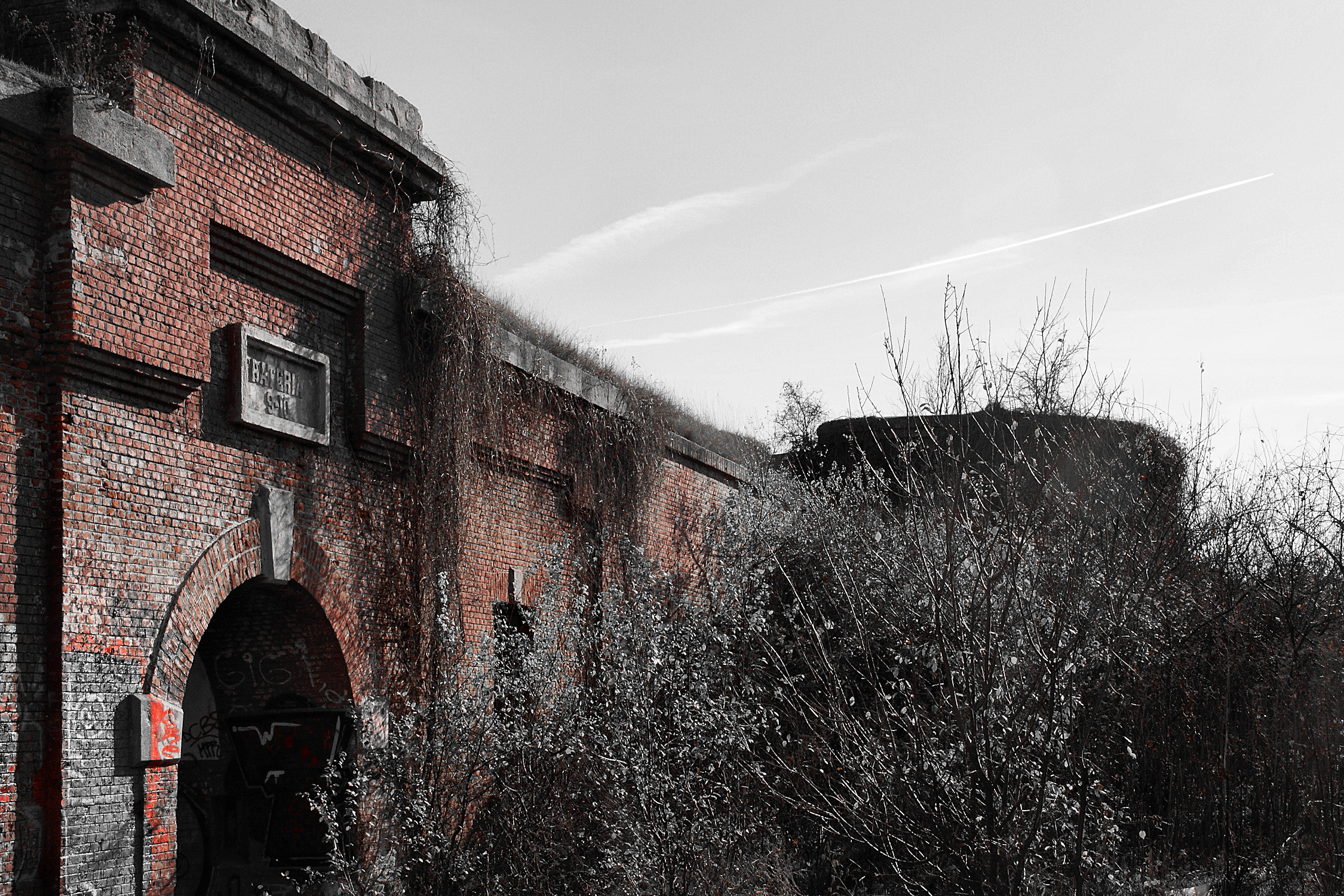
Battery 9–10 in Cățelu

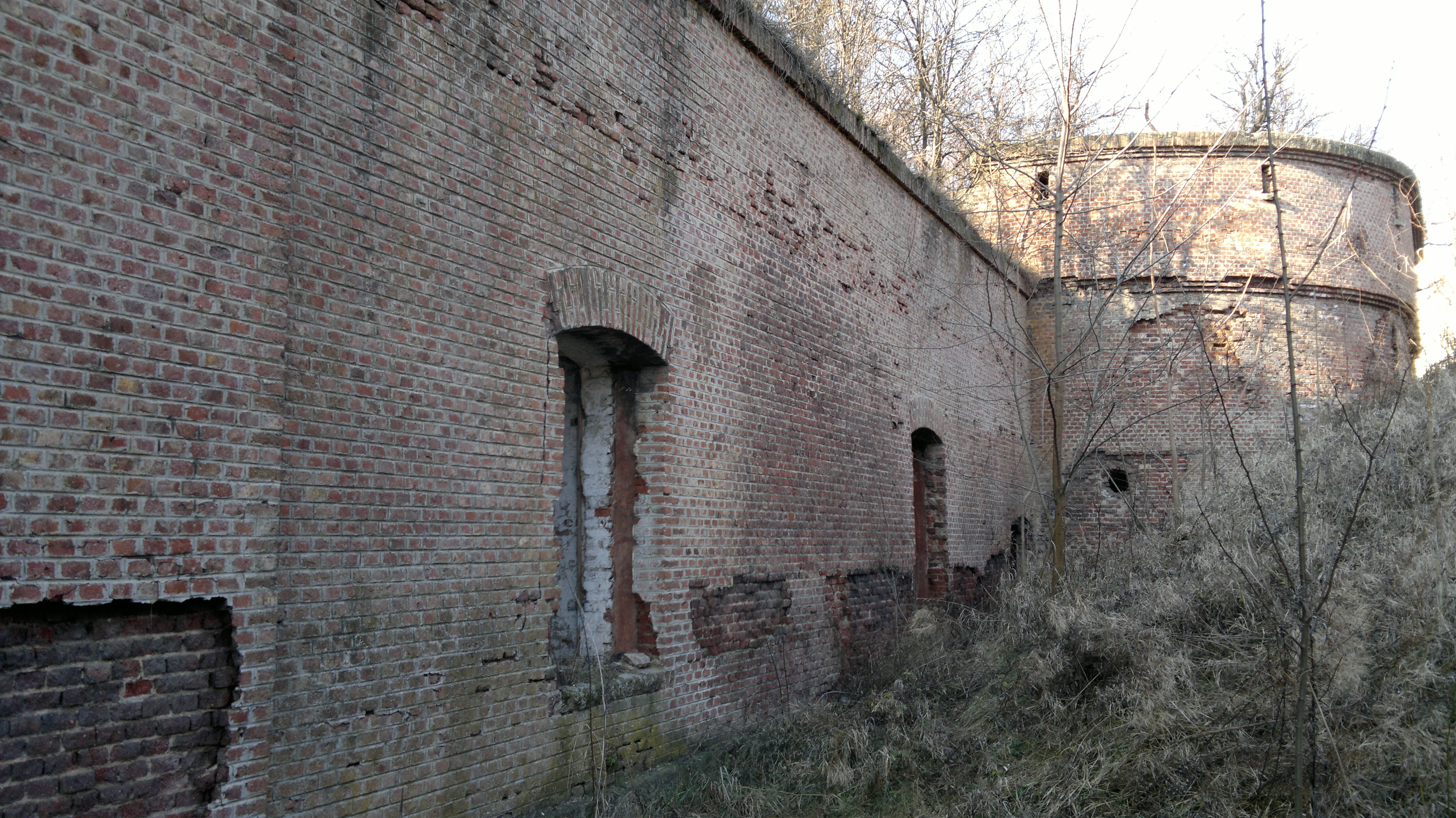
Battery 17–18 in Domnești

Today, the military has abandoned most of the forts. Stray dogs seek shelter in some of them; storage space and mushroom-growing facilities are other reported uses. During the Communist era, Fort 18 in Chiajna was used as a pickled goods market. However, the military still employs some of the forts, those to the southwest of the city in particular. They serve as firing ranges and munitions deposits, also housing army units; civilians are forbidden entry. The best-known fort is number 13, at Jilava—a military prison from 1907, a feared destination for political prisoners and place of execution during the Communist era, as well as a penitentiary. Another well-known fort—and the most visited one—is Battery 9-10, located in Cățelu, to the south-east of Bucharest.
