= Romanian Cyber Defence Command =

- Comandamentul Apărării Cibernetice
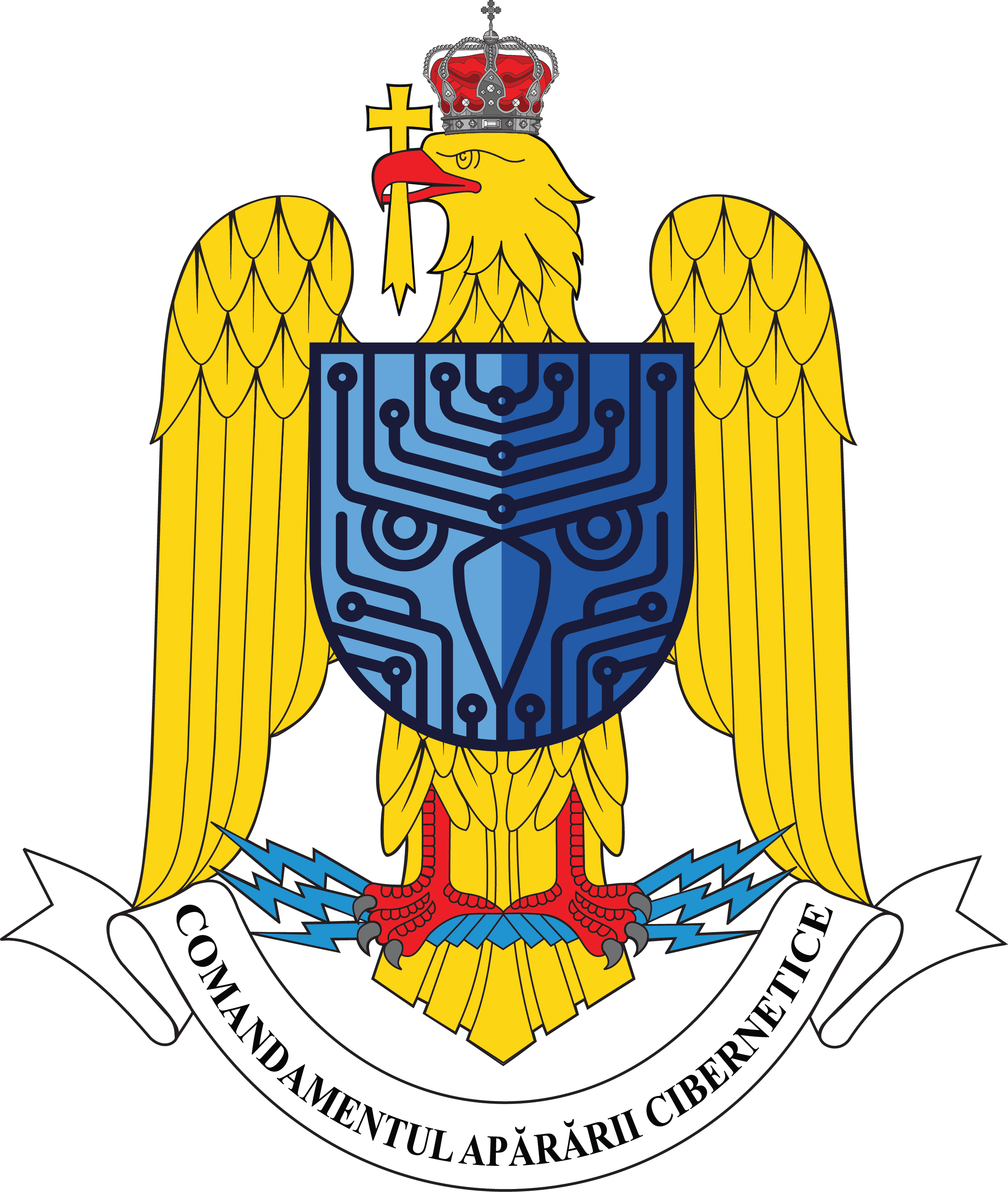
- Coat of arms of the Romanian Cyber Defence Command
- Country: Romania
- Branch: Romanian Armed Forces
- Type: Cyber force command
- Garrison/HQ: Bucharest
- Website: cybercommand.ro

Commanders
- Current commander: Brigadier General Răzvan Marian Tudose

Insignia
- Flag of the Romanian Cyber Defence Command

The Romanian Cyber Defence Command (Romanian: Comandamentul Apărării Cibernetice or CApC) acts under the command and control of the Defence Staff and represents the military authority responsible for the development, protection and resilience of military IT networks and services that support the Romanian Force Structure.

== History ==
In 2016, NATO decided at the Warsaw Summit, that cyberspace would become an operational domain.

Given that cyber confrontations in the military domain are becoming increasingly diverse and frequent, with an impact comparable to that of conventional combat capabilities, and as more and more countries invest in cyber capabilities, the Romanian Army has identified a need within its force structure to establish a specialized unit to manage this type of threat.

The Romanian Cyber Defence Command was established on 1 December 2018.

== Role ==
The Cyber Defence Command is part of the forces that actively participate at the Romanian Military missions’ accomplishment. In this context, it has the role to plan, organize, control and conduct cyber space operations, in order to support the networks functional resilience and to generate effects in support of the joint forces, within both the national and allied environment. At the same time, the command provides network management and development and Information Technology services.

In the field of cyber security and defence, the Cyber Defence Command has the following responsibilities: cyber incidents management, secure the protection and resilience of military networks against cyber threats, identification and evaluation of cyber threats and risks, plan, organize, control and conduct cyber space operations, integration of the cyber operations in the joint operations of the Romanian Armed Forces, military and interdepartmental cooperation, national and international, contributions to concept and legislation development in the cyber field, contributions to the development and optimization of military and national cyber defence capabilities.

In the field of Information Technology, the Cyber Defence Command has the following responsibilities: secure the functionality and resilience of data within the military cyber networks, development, implementation and management of IT applications for the users within the Ministry of National Defence (MoND), management of software licenses for the MoND, verification and validation of IT applications used within the MoND networks, implementation of IT models and processes that provide the functionality of the military cyber services and networks.

In order to fulfill the above mentioned responsibilities, the Cyber Defence Command generates, trains, controls and coordinates teams and organizations that react correspondingly to the type and level of the risks, threats and challenges from the administered cyber networks.

== Structure ==
The Cyber Defence Command has the following subordinated structures:

- IT Agency
- Cyber Defence Agency
  - CERTMIL
- Deployable Cyber Defence Systems and IT Agency
- Logistics Section
