= Romanian Armed Forces =

Military forces of Romania

- Forțele Armate Române (Romanian)
- The coat of arms of the Romanian General Staff
- Founded: 12 November 1859
- Current form: 11 April 2000
- Service branches: Romanian Land Forces; Romanian Naval Forces; Romanian Air Force
- Headquarters: Bucharest, Romania

Leadership
- Supreme Commander: Nicușor Dan
- Minister of National Defence: Ștefan-Radu Oprea
- Chief of the General Staff: General Gheorghiță Vlad

Personnel
- Military age: 18
- Conscription: No (stopped on 1 January 2007)
- Active personnel: c. 90,000 (2025)
- Reserve personnel: 55,000 (2025)
- Deployed personnel: c. 970 (February 2025)

Expenditure
- Budget: $11.2 billion (2026)
- Percent of GDP: 2.45% (2026)

Industry
- Domestic suppliers: ROMARM, Avioane Craiova, Industria Aeronautica Romana, Aerostar, Romaero
- Foreign suppliers: United States; Germany; Israel; France; Switzerland; Italy
- Annual exports: €187,000,000 (2018)

Related articles
- History: Military history of Romania
- Ranks: Romanian Armed Forces ranks and insignia

The Romanian Armed Forces (Romanian: Forțele Armate Române or Armata Română) are the military forces of Romania. It comprises the Land Forces, the Naval Forces and the Air Force. The current Chief of the General Staff of Defence is Lieutenant General Gheorghiță Vlad who is managed by the Minister of National Defence while the president is the Supreme Commander of the Armed Forces during wartime.

As of 2025, the Armed Forces number around 90,000 active personnel and 55,000 reserves. In 2023, the Land Forces had a reported strength of 35,500, the Air Force 11,700, the Naval Forces 8,000 (as of 2026), and Joint Forces 17,500. Total defence spending currently accounts for 2.45% of total national GDP, which represents approximately 11.2 billion US dollars. The Armed Forces are built for territorial defence, with support to NATO and EU missions, and contributions to regional and global stability and security.

Military service is voluntary in peacetime (since 2007), and compulsory in case of curfew, war, or national emergency.

== History of the Romanian Armed Forces ==
The modern armies of Moldavia and Wallachia were formed in 1830 following Regulamentul Organic. During the 1848 Wallachian Revolution, Gheorghe Magheru assembled an army at Râureni (now part of Râmnicu Vâlcea). However, Magheru ordered his troops to disband when the Ottoman forces swept into Bucharest to stop the revolution.

=== Romanian War of Independence ===
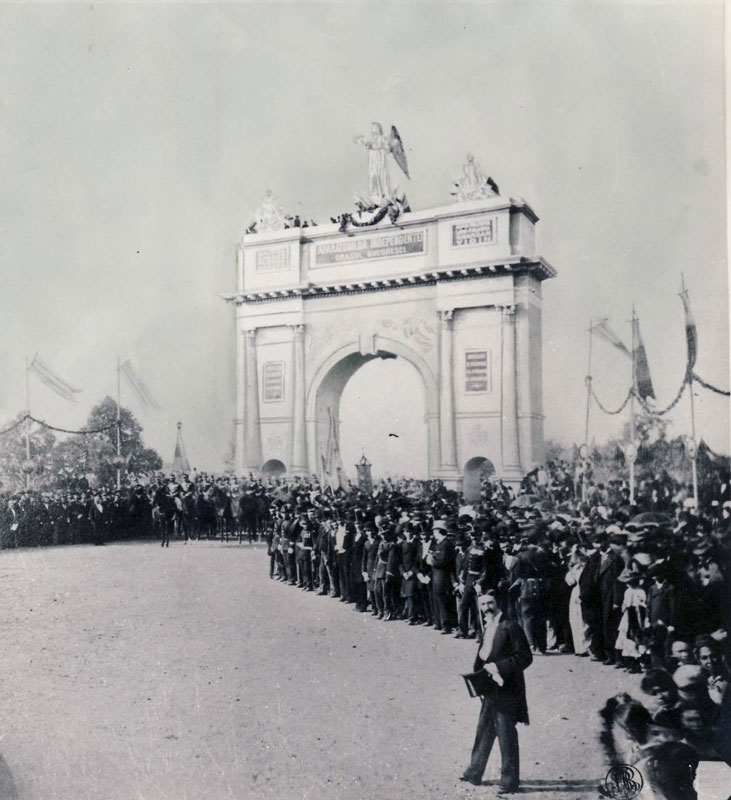
Romanian troops returning to Bucharest after the Independence War, 8 October 1878

The current Romanian Land Forces were formed in 1860, immediately after the unification of Wallachia with Moldavia, and were commanded by Alexandru Ioan Cuza, Domnitor of Romania until his abdication in 1866. In 1877, at the request of Nikolai Konstantinovich, Grand Duke of Russia the Romanian army joined the Russian forces, and led by King Carol I, fought in what was to become the Romanian War of Independence. They participated in the Siege of Plevna and several other battles. The Romanians won the war, but suffered about 27,000 casualties. Until World War I, the Romanian army didn't face any other serious actions, although it participated in the Second Balkan War against Bulgaria.

=== Second Balkan War ===
Romania mobilized its army on 5 July 1913, with intention of seizing Southern Dobruja, and declared war on Bulgaria on 10 July. In a diplomatic circular that said, "Romania does not intend either to subjugate the polity nor defeat the army of Bulgaria", the Romanian government endeavoured to allay international concerns about its motives and about increased bloodshed. According to Richard Hall, "the entrance of Romania into the conflict made the Bulgarian situation untenable and the Romanian thrust across the Danube was the decisive military act of the Second Balkan War."

=== World War I ===
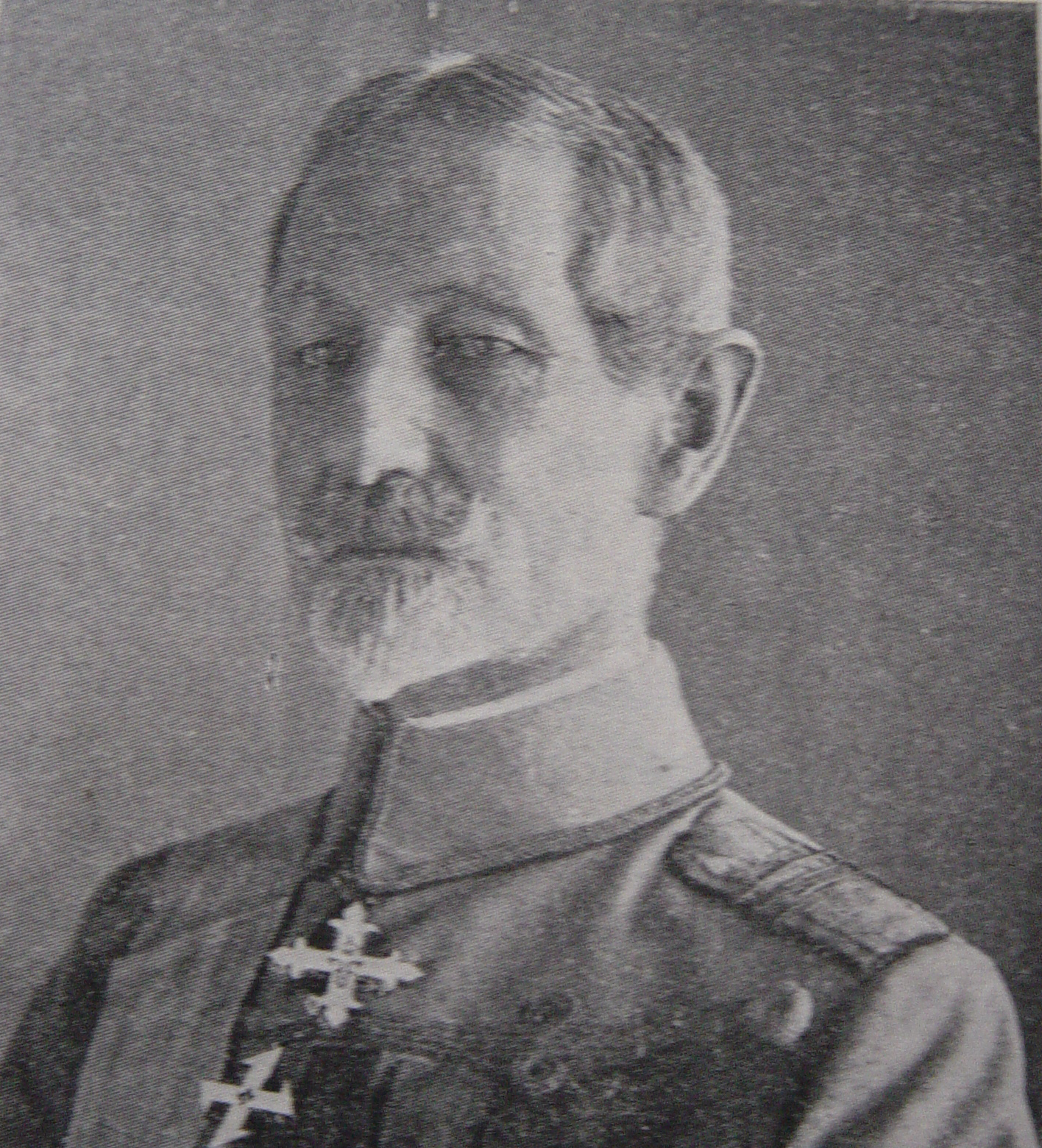
Marshal Alexandru Averescu

On 6 July 1916, Romania declared war on Germany and Austria-Hungary, following the initial success of the Brusilov Offensive (a major Russian offensive against the armies of the Central Powers on the Eastern Front). The Romanian armies entered Transylvania (then part of the Austro-Hungarian Empire), together with Russian forces. However, German forces under the command of General Erich von Falkenhayn stalled the attack in November, 1916, and drove back the Romanians. At the same time, Austrian and Turkish troops invaded southern Romania, forcing the country into a two-front war. The Central Powers drove deep into Romania and conquered the south of the country (Wallachia, including Bucharest) by the end of 1916. The Romanian forces, led by Marshal Constantin Prezan, retreated into the north-east part of Romania (Moldavia). In the summer of 1917 however, Prezan, aided by the future Marshal, General Ion Antonescu, successfully defended the remaining unoccupied territories against German and Austro-Hungarian forces led by Field Marshal August von Mackensen. General Alexandru Averescu led the Second Army in the victories of the Battle of Mărăști (22 July to 1 August 1917) and the Battle of Mărășești (6 August to 8 September 1917). As a result of the Russian Revolution, Romania was left isolated and unable to continue the war, and was forced to sign the Treaty of Bucharest with the Central Powers. Later on, in 1919, Germany agreed, in the Treaty of Versailles Article 259, to renounce all the benefits provided to it by the Treaty of Bucharest in 1918. After the successful offensive on the Thessaloniki front, which put Bulgaria out of the war, Romania re-entered the war on 10 November 1918, a day before its end in the West.

=== World War II ===
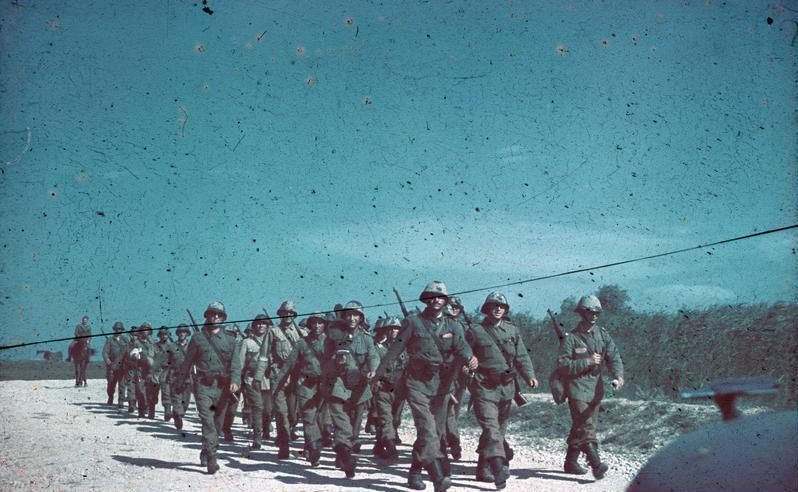
Romanian infantry in 1943

After General (later Marshal) Ion Antonescu took power in September 1940, Romania signed the Tripartite Pact with the Axis powers and subsequently took part in Operation Barbarossa in 1941. An expeditionary force invaded the Soviet Union in Bessarabia and southern Ukraine, alongside the German Wehrmacht. The expeditionary force, 'Army Group Antonescu', was composed on 22 June 1941 of the 3rd Army, the 4th Army, the 2nd Army Corps, and the 11th Infantry Division. The 3rd Army comprised the 4th Army Corps (6th and 7th Infantry Divisions), the Cavalry Corps, the Mountain Corps, two separate artillery battalion, a TA unit, and the Air Force's 3rd Army Cooperation Command. The 4th Army consisted of the 3rd Army Corps, the 5th Army Corps, the 11th Army Corps (two fortress brigades), and the 4th Army Cooperation Command. The army group-level 2nd Army Corps, under Major General N. Macici, controlled the 9th and 10th Infantry Divisions and the 7th Cavalry Brigade. Additionally the Divizia 1 Blindată (România) was formed for service on the Eastern Front. The Army Group's first offensive, in conjunction with the Eleventh Army, Operation Munchen, enabled Romania to retake the territory immediately east of the Dnister, former part of Moldavia. The Romanian Armies saw their first major battles at Odessa and Sevastopol, and in 1942 advanced with other Axis forces deeper into Soviet territory during Operation Blue.

The greatest disaster for the Romanian expeditionary force on the Eastern Front came at Stalingrad, where, during the Soviet counter-offensive of November 1942, the thinly spread forces of the Third Army (deployed north of Stalingrad) and of the Fourth Army (deployed south of Stalingrad) were attacked by vastly superior Soviet forces and suffered combined losses of some 158,000 personnel.

During April–May 1944 the Romanian forces led by General Mihai Racoviță, together with elements of the German Sixth Army were responsible for defending Northern Romania during the Soviet First Jassy-Kishinev Offensive, and took part in the Battles of Târgu Frumos. In late August 1944, the Red Army entered eastern Romania. The Battle of Jassy took place on 20–25 August 1944. 150,000 German soldiers died (80,000 in Stalingrad), 106,000 Germans was taken as prisoners by the Red Army (108,000 in Stalingrad); the fate of the rest 80,000 remain unknown. On 23 August 1944, a coup led by King Michael I of Romania deposed Marshal Antonescu and set up a pro-Soviet government. It has been estimated that the royal coup shortened the war by six months. Romania soon declared war on Nazi Germany, and the First and Fourth Armies were pressed into action. After the expelling of the last Wehrmacht remnants from Romania, the Romanian Armies took part in the Siege of Budapest and the Prague Offensive of May 1945.

==== Highlights (Axis) ====
- Romanian engineers contributed to the construction of the longest bridge ever built under fire – the bridge over the Dnieper at Beryslav.
- The Romanian capture of Odessa was the most important wartime conquest – without substantial German support – by any of the minor European Axis powers.
- On 1 September 1942, the Romanian 3rd Mountain Division took part in the largest amphibious assault undertaken in Europe by the Axis Powers during the war.
- In late 1942, General Ioan Dumitrache captured Nalchik, the furthest point of Axis advance in the Caucasus.
- Romania provided up to 40% of the Axis personnel in the Kuban Bridgehead. On 7 April 1943, a single Romanian battalion restored the front of an entire German division.
- When an entire German army (the 6th) came under Romanian command in May 1944 (as part of general Petre Dumitrescu's Armeegruppe), German commanders came under the actual (rather than nominal) command of their foreign allies for the first time in the war.
- Romania received more Knight's Crosses than any other non-German Axis power.
  - Ion Antonescu was the first foreigner to be awarded the Knight's Cross of the Iron Cross.
  - Mihail Lascăr was the first foreign recipient of the Knight's Cross of the Iron Cross with Oak Leaves.
- The Romanian Mareșal tank destroyer is credited with being the inspiration for the German Hetzer.
- In terms of heavy armored vehicles, Romania captured 2 KV-1 tanks, 1 IS-2 tank and 1 ISU-152 assault gun. These were the only heavy AFVs that Romania possessed throughout the war, as the country's armor establishment - even as late as July 1944 - never went beyond medium tanks and assault guns.

=== Cold War ===
After the Romanian Communist Party seized power, the Armed Forces of Romania was reformed to mirror the soviet model. It was reestablished as the Romanian People's Army (Romanian: Armata Populară Română) under the original supervision of Minister of Defence, Emil Bodnăraș. Between 1955 and 1991, the Romanian People's Army took part in events of the Warsaw Pact, of which Romania was a member. During this period, the army was supplied with weapons and equipment from the Soviet Union. From 1947 to 1960, the country divided into 3 military regions: Western (Cluj), Eastern (Bacău), and South (Bucharest).

In 1980 the Romanian Land Forces was reorganized in 4 Army Commands: 1st (Bucharest), 2nd (Buzau), 3rd (Craiova) and 4th (Cluj-Napoca). In the four Army Commands were 8 Mechanized Divisions, 2 Tank Divisions and 1 Tank Brigade, as well as 4 Mountain Brigades (specialized motorized infantry units).

In 1989 the RLF had, as armored equipment, a total of 2715 combat vehicles: 945 outdated (soviet WW-2 type) T-34-85 tanks, 790 soviet and Czechoslovak T-55/-55A/-55AM tanks, 415 Romanian built TR-77-580, 535 Romanian built TR-85-800 and 30 Soviet T-72 "Ural-1" tanks.

=== Post-1990 ===
The People's Army was dissolved after the Romanian Revolution in the beginning of 1990 and was rebranded as the Romanian Armed Forces. Since 1994, Romania has been actively participating in the Partnership for Peace program and on 29 March 2004, it officially joined the North Atlantic Treaty Organization (NATO). During the NATO bombing of Yugoslavia in 1999, Romania placed its territory and airspace at disposal for NATO troop and even sent troops to the Kosovo Force contingent in the summer of 1999 to stabilize the situation in Kosovo and Metohija. On 15 November 2002, Hungary, Romania, Slovakia, and Ukraine created a multinational engineering battalion called "Tisa", which includes an engineering company from the armed forces. Romania has taken part in the War in Afghanistan since July 2002, with Romanian contingent being increased from 962 to more than 1,500 troops in 2009. The armed forces also took part in the War in Iraq from 2003 to August 2009, in which the losses of the Romanian contingent amounted to 3 soldiers killed and at least 11 wounded.

== Structure ==
The civil oversight of the Romanian Armed Forces is the prerogative of the Ministry of National Defence (Ministerul Apărării Naționale), a department of the Romanian government. The highest professional military body of command and control is the General Staff of Defence (Statul Major al Apărării).

Ministry of National Defence (Ministerul Apărării Naționale), Bucharest

Main departments under the direct command of the minister of national defence:

- Department for Defence Policy, Planning and International Relations
  - Institute for Political Studies on Defence and Military History
- Department for Parliament Liaison and Personnel Welfare
- Defence Intelligence General Directorate
- General Secretariat
- Armament General Directorate
  - Military Equipment and Technologies Research Agency
- Human Resources Management General Directorate
- Control and inspection corps
- Finance General Directorate
- Juridical General Directorate
- Internal Audit Directorate
- Domain and Infrastructure Division
- Information and Public Relations Directorate
- Directorate for the Prevention and Investigation of Corruption and Fraud
- General Staff of Defence (Statul Major al Apărării), Bucharest
  - Land Forces Staff
  - Air Force Staff
  - Naval Forces Staff
  - Medical Directorate
  - "Carol I" National Defence University
  - Military Technical Academy
- Structures under the direct command of the minister of national defence:
  - Directorate of Military Courts
  - Military State Pension Fund
  - The National Office for Heroes' Memory
  - Military Sports Club - Steaua Bucuresti
- Other structures:
  - National Defence College
  - Regional Department for Studies on the Management of Defence Resources
  - NATO Force Integration Unit (NFIU)

=== General Staff of Defence ===
General Staff of Defence (Statul Major al Apărării)

- Leadership:
  - Chief of the General Staff of Defence (Șeful Statului Major al Apărării)
  - Deputy Chief of the General Staff of Defence (Locțiitor al șefului Statului Major al Apărării)
  - Deputy Chief for Resources of the General Staff of Defence (Locțiitor pentru resurse al șefului Statului Major al Apărării)
  - Director of the General Staff of Defence (Director al Statului Major al Apărării)
  - Command NCO of the General Staff of Defence (Subofițerul de comandă al Statului Major al Apărării)
- Directorates:
  - Personnel and Mobilisation Directorate (Direcția personal și mobilizare)
  - Operations Directorate (Direcția operații)
  - Logistics Directorate (Direcția logistică)
  - Strategic Planning Directorate (Direcția planificare strategică)
  - Communications and Information Technology Directorate (Direcția comunicații și tehnologia informației)
  - Training and Doctrine Directorate (Direcția instruire și doctrină)
  - Infrastructure and Equipment Planning Directorate (Direcția structuri și planificarea înzestrării)
  - Medical Directorate (Direcția medicală)
- Service branches:
  - Land Forces Staff (Statul Major al Forțelor Terestre)
  - Air Forces Staff (Statul Major al Forțelor Aeriene)
  - Naval Forces Staff (Statul Major al Forțelor Navale)
- Commands:
  - National Military Command Center (Centrul Național Militar de Comandă)
  - Cyber-Defence Command (Comandamentul Apărării Cibernetice)
  - Communications and Informatics Command (Comandamentul Comunicațiilor și Informaticii)
  - Joint Forces Command (Comandamentul Forțelor Întrunite)
  - Special Operations Forces Command (Comandamentul Forțelor pentru Operații Speciale)
  - Joint Logistics Command (Comandamentul Logistic Întrunit)
- Delegations:
  - Romanian Military Delegation to NATO and the EU (Reprezentanța militară a României la NATO și UE)
  - National Liaison Delegation at the Allied Command Transformation (Reprezentanța Națională de Legătură la Comandamentul Aliat pentru Transformare), Norfolk, US
  - Delegation of the General Staff for Defence at the Supreme Headquarters Allied Powers Europe (Reprezentanța SMAp la Comandamentul suprem al forțelor aliate din Europa (SHAPE)), Mons, Belgium
- Other organisations:
  - Military Technical Academy "Ferdinand I" (Academia Tehnică Militară "Ferdinand I")
  - National Defence University "Carol I" (Universitatea Națională de Apărare "Carol I")
  - Defence Geospatial Information Agency (Agenția de Informații Geospațiale a Apărării)
  - Romanian National Military Archive (Arhivele Militare Naționale Romane)
  - National Military Museum "King Ferdinand" (Muzeul Militar Național "Regele Ferdinand")
  - National Cataloguisation Bureau (Biroul Național de Codificare)

== Equipment ==
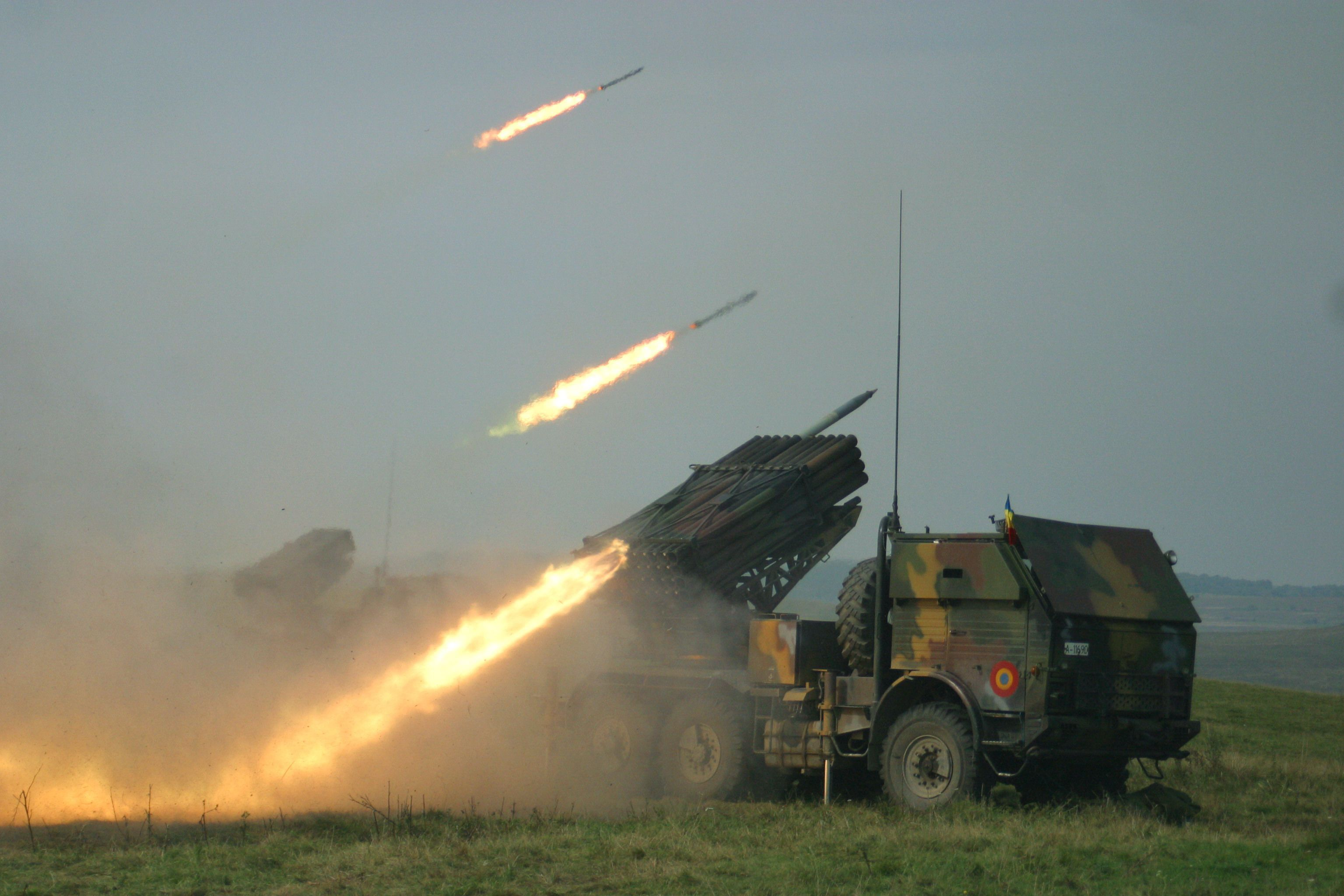
LAROM multiple rocket launchers

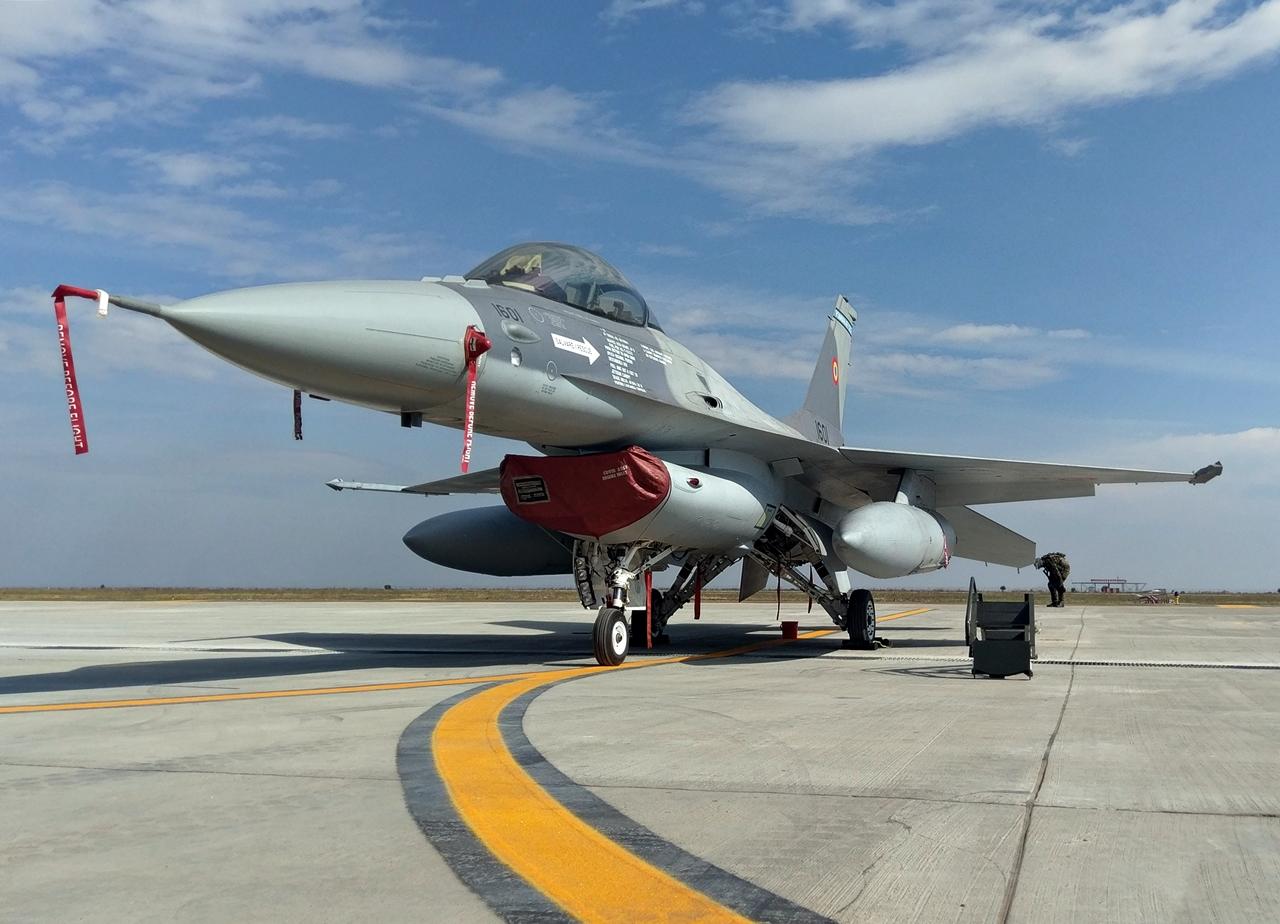
F-16 multi-role fighter at Fetești Air Base in October 2016.

The Land Forces have overhauled their equipment in recent years, and are today a modern army with multiple NATO capabilities. The Land Forces are at present planning on replacing the TAB APC vehicles with new armored personnel carriers produced in conjunction with the Germany company Rheinmetall. The Air Force currently operates F-16 A/B Block 15 MLU fighters. The Air Force has also received 7 new C-27J Spartan tactical airlift aircraft, in order to replace the bulk of the old transport force. Two modernized ex-Royal Navy Type 22 frigates were acquired by the Naval Forces in 2004 and a further four modern missile corvettes will be commissioned in the next few years. Three domestically produced IAR 330 Puma NAVAL helicopters were also ordered by the Naval Forces, and were commissioned in late 2008. In 2021, Romania had in total 943 tanks, 1500+ armored vehicles, 808 towed artillery and 240 rocket projectors.

== Manpower ==
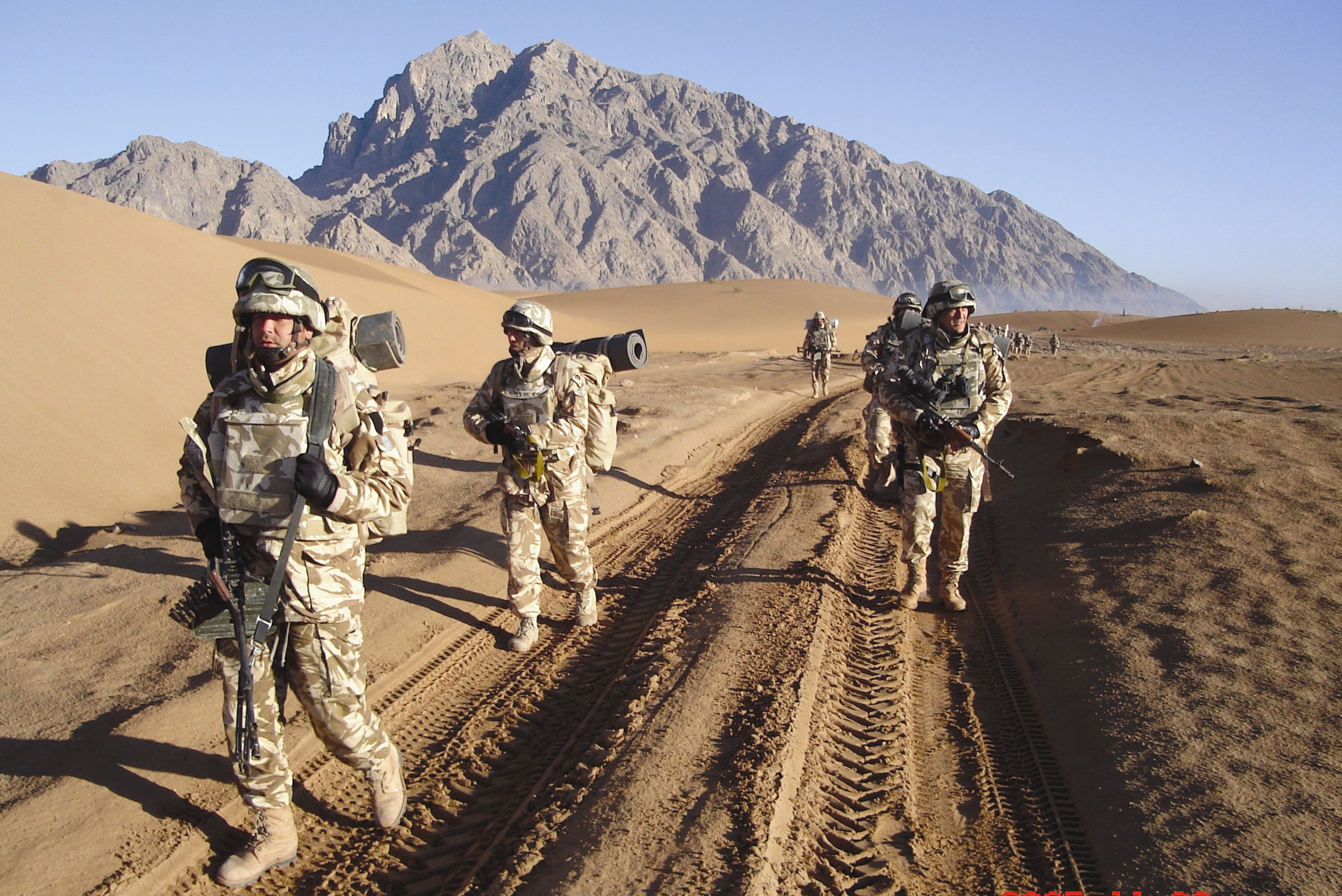
Romanian soldiers on patrol in Afghanistan

Romania joined NATO in 2004. As a consequence, extensive preparations were made to abolish conscription by 2007 and create a professional army in place of a conscripted one.

The new armed forces include 81,300 active personnel and 55,000 reserves in 2023. Some 35,500 make up the Romanian Land Forces, 11,700 serve as the Romanian Air Force and 8,000 are in the Romanian Naval Forces (as of 2026); the remaining 17,500 serve in other fields. As of 2025, the number of active duty personnel reached around 90,000.

== Future ==
The Romanian Military will essentially undergo a three-stage restructuring. As of 2017, the first two stages have been completed. 2015 marked the end of the second stage when the armed forces reached a superior compatibility with NATO forces. In 2025, the long-term stage is to be completed. The stages aim at modernizing the structure of the armed forces, reducing the personnel as well as acquiring newer and more improved technology that is compatible with NATO standards.

The military sees obsolete Soviet-era equipment as a major limitation and intends to buy modern combat equipment under the Armata 2040 project. Between 2017 and 2023, Romania acquired the MIM-104 Patriot air defence systems, Piranha V armored vehicles, as well as US M142 HIMARS multiple launch rocket systems. A program for acquiring F-35 fifth-generation fighters is also currently underway with deliveries expected in 2032.

== Current deployments ==
As of February 2025, Romania has around 970 military personnel deployed in international missions. Largest deployments being: 470 troops in Bosnia and Herzegovina as part of EUFOR Althea, 184 troops in Kosovo as part of KFOR, 100 troops in Poland as part of NATO Enhanced Forward Presence, and 60 troops as part of EUTM RCA in the Central African Republic. Another 75 troops are deployed on the Standing NATO Mine Countermeasures Group 2 in the Mediterranean Sea and around 30 troops are participating in the training of the Armed Forces of Ukraine as part of Operation Interflex.

== Other militarized institutions ==
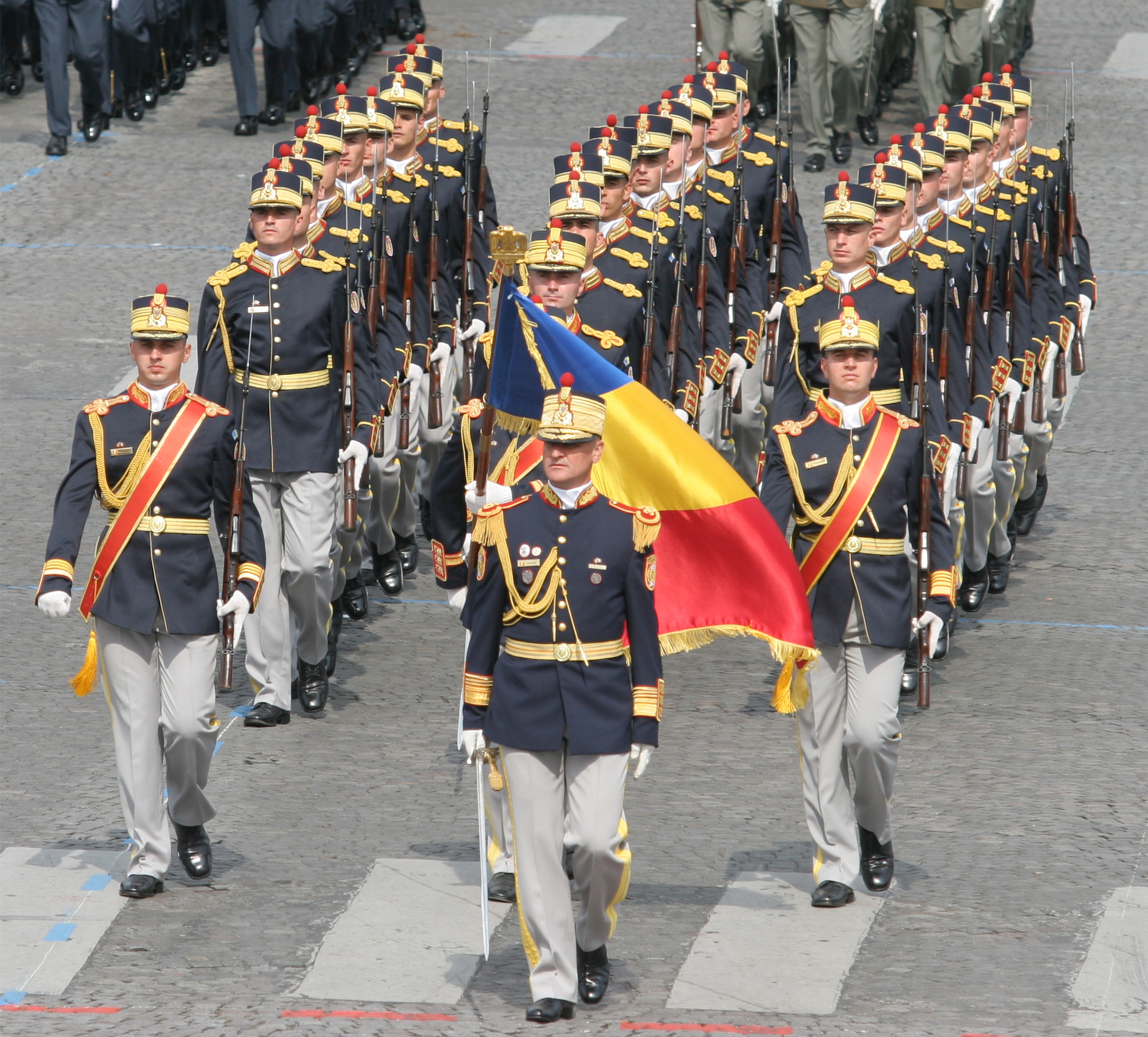
Soldiers of the 30th Honor Guard Brigade (at that time Regiment) "Mihai Viteazul" during the 2007 Bastille Day Military Parade in Paris.

The following Romanian institutions have military status but are not part of the Armed Forces:

- Romanian Gendarmerie (Jandarmeria Română), subordinated to the Ministry of Administration and Interior;
- Inspectoratul General al Corpului Pompierilor Militari (Military Firefighters) and Comandamentul Protecției Civile (Civil Defence), merged into the Romanian Inspectorate for Emergency Situations within the Ministry of the Interior;
- Inspectoratul General de Aviație (General Aviation Inspectorate) within the Ministry of the Interior
- Serviciul Român de Informații (Romanian Intelligence Service);
- Serviciul de Protecție și Pază (Protection and Guard Service, provides protection to Romanian and foreign officials);
- Serviciul de Telecomunicații Speciale (Special Telecommunications Service);
- Serviciul de Informații Externe (Foreign Intelligence Service).

== See also ==
- List of the Chiefs of the General Staff of Romania
- List of generals of the Romanian Armed Forces
- List of countries by number of active troops
- Foreign relations of Romania
- Arms industry in Romania
