= Army of the Socialist Republic of Romania =

Former Romanian army

Army of the Romanian People's Republic (1948–1965) Army of the Socialist Republic of Romania (1965–1989)
- Armata Republicii Populare Romîne (1948–1965); Armata Republicii Socialiste România (1965–1989)
- Ceremonial Flag (1966–1989)
- Motto: Pentru Patria Noastră ("For our Homeland")
- Founded: 1948; 78 years ago
- Disbanded: 1989; 37 years ago
- Service branches: Romanian Land Forces; Romanian Naval Forces; Romanian Air Force
- Headquarters: Bucharest

Leadership
- Supreme Commander-in-chief: Nicolae Ceaușescu
- Minister of Defence: Vasile Milea (last)
- Chief of the General Staff: Ștefan Gușă (last)

Personnel
- Conscription: 16 months
- Active personnel: 210,000 in 1989; 270,000 at peak in 1984
- Deployed personnel: Mozambique – 500; Angola – 600

Industry
- Foreign suppliers: Soviet Union; Czechoslovakia; Cuba; Poland; East Germany; Democratic People's Republic of Korea; China; United Kingdom; France; USA; Israel
- Annual exports: $1,000,000,000 (1982)

Related articles
- History: Romanian anti-communist resistance movement; Mozambican Civil War; Angolan Civil War; Romanian Revolution
- Ranks: Military ranks of the Socialist Republic of Romania

The Army of the Socialist Republic of Romania (Romanian: Armata Republicii Socialiste România) was the army of the Socialist Republic of Romania (1965 to 1989), previously known as the Army of the Romanian People's Republic (Romanian: Armata Republicii Populare Romîne) during the Romanian People's Republic (1947 to 1965). Following the Romanian Revolution in 1989, it was renamed to the Romanian Armed Forces. It consisted of the Ground Forces, the Navy, and the Air Force.

== History ==
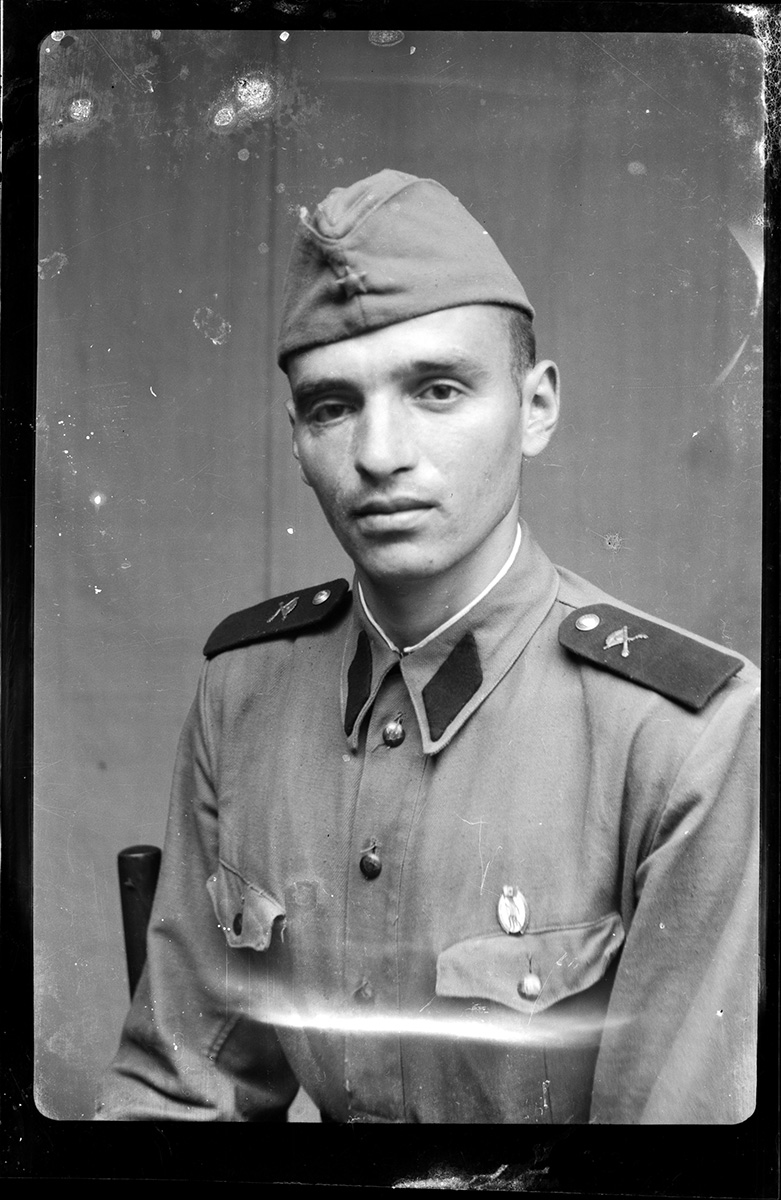
An artillery soldier with a shirt and cap model 1952, shoulder boards, and service branch pin model 1948

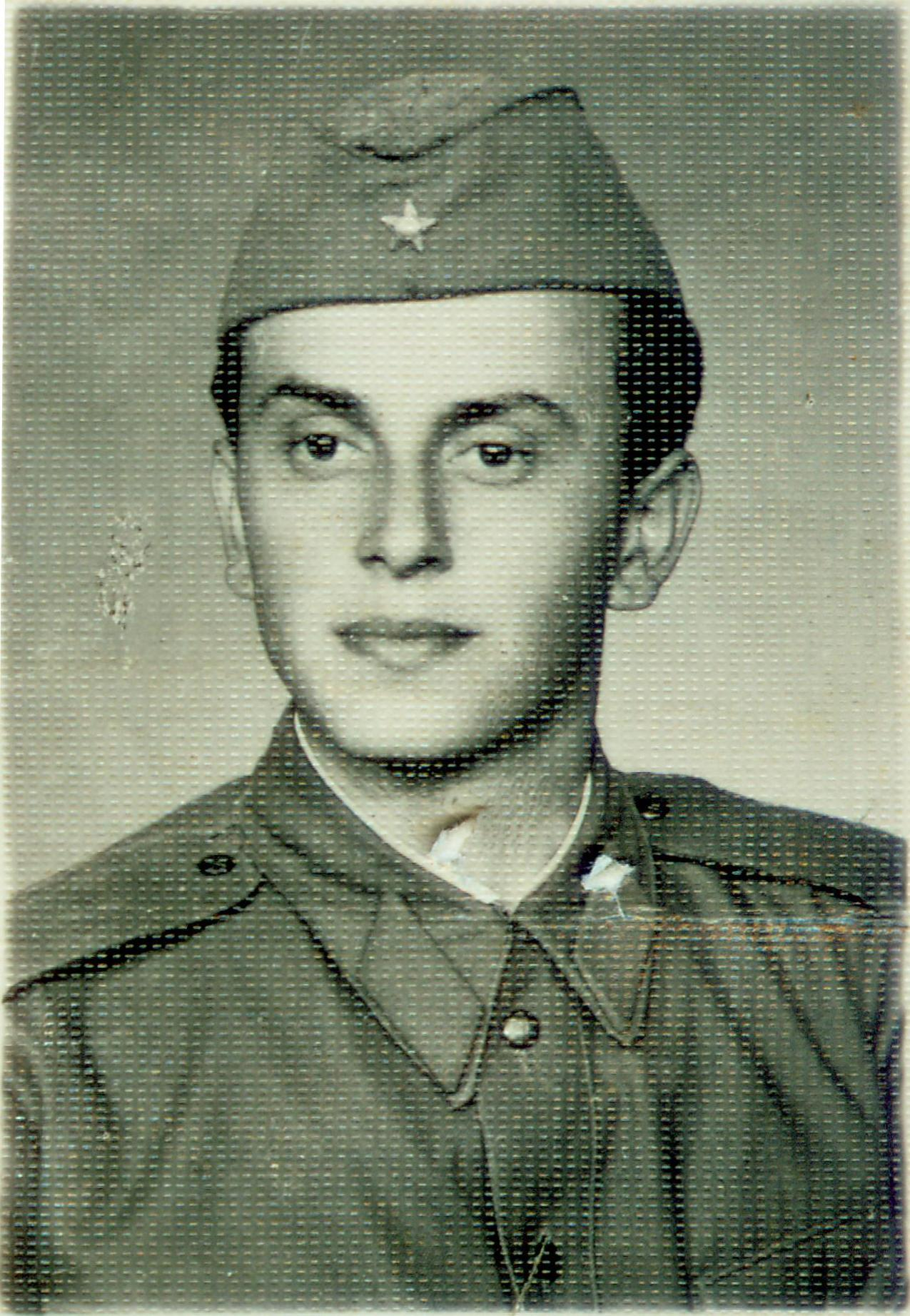
A conscript from Botoșani in uniform, prior to university studies, 1960

In 1944, the Red Army invaded Romania in the Jassy-Kishinev Offensive, causing the overthrow of Ion Antonescu's Nazi-aligned regime via a Royal coup. In 1945, new military regulations were developed based on those of the Red Army and in 1946, Romania came completely under the influence of the Soviet Union. It became part of the Eastern Bloc. The military regulations were finalized in 1949. Like all other socialist states, the Army was subjected to the rule of the Romanian Communist Party, whose general secretary was, since 1974, President of the Republic in addition to his role as commander-in-chief of the army.

During the tenure of General Emil Bodnăraș as defense minister, the Army went through a period of Sovietization, with Bodnăraș personally sending several Romanian Communists to Moscow to be trained in Soviet military institutions such as the Frunze Military Academy. 30% of the experienced officers corps were purged from the military due to fears of opposition and monarchist loyalties. Between 1949 and 1952, over 700 Romanian military personnel were being trained in the USSR, which would drop by over 200 in the next six years. They also adopted a Soviet-style full dress and everyday uniform. In the Republic's early days, the Soviet Armed Forces had troops stationed there. The Soviet presence resulted from the Soviet occupation of Romania. Bodnăraș was seen to have influenced Nikita Khrushchev's decision to withdraw Soviet troops in 1958.

From May 1955 to 1991, Romania was a member of the Warsaw Pact, which provided the Romanian Army with weapons, other Soviet-made equipment, and assistance in building up its own defense industry. Under the presidency of Nicolae Ceaușescu, the RPA asserted functional independence in the defense industry and on equipment acquisitions while maintaining strong ties to the Warsaw Pact Command, with many of its armored vehicles, aircraft and artillery, as well as individual weaponry, being nationally produced. Also, a new set of enlisted and NCO ranks were adopted in the 1970s, alongside the reinstatement of the senior NCO ranks (maistru militar), which replaced the former Soviet rank model for such personnel. On 12 March 1958, the Sports Committee of Friendly Armies was created, with the Romanian Army becoming a founding member. In November 1986, a referendum was held by the government in which voters, when asked whether they approved of reducing the size of the army and cutting military spending by 5%, approved the proposals by 100%, with not a single vote counting against it.

The Armed Forces would be renamed in 1989 following the Romanian Revolution, during which officers and personnel of the military defected to the side of the opposition after a public speech by Ceaușescu broadcast on state television and a firing squad provided by paratroop regiment personnel Captain Ionel Boeru, Sergeant-Major Georghin Octavian and Dorin-Marian Cîrlan took part in the Trial and execution of Nicolae and Elena Ceaușescu on 25 December. In the week after Ceaușescu's downfall, the defected Armed Forces fought bloody street battles, allegedly against Securitate forces who were still on Ceaușescu's side.

== Political and military leadership ==
=== Supreme Commander-in-Chief ===
The title of Supreme Commander-in-Chief was held by the de facto leader of the nation, General Secretary, even though the President of the State Council was the de jure head of state until 1974, when it was replaced by the President of Romania.

No.	Portrait	Supreme Commander-in-Chief	Took office	Left office	Time in office
1	Nicolae Ceaușescu	Lieutenant general Nicolae Ceaușescu (1918–1989)	1969	22 December 1989	24 years, 275 days

=== Minister of National Defence ===
The office of Minister of National Defence (Romanian: Ministrul Apărării Naționale) is the chief political leader of the military. Before that, it was the Minister of War (Romanian: Ministru de Război) who handled military affairs in the government. The country's defence policy was managed by the minister's agency, the Ministry of the National Defense, led by a professional officer with the rank of colonel general or above. The minister was a permanent member of the Politburo of the PCR.

No.	Portrait	Minister of National Defence	Took office	Left office	Time in office
1	Emil Bodnăraș	General of the Army; Emil Bodnăraș	27 December 1947	3 October 1955	7 years, 280 days
2	Leontin Sălăjan	General of the Army; Leontin Sălăjan	3 October 1955	28 August 1966	10 years, 329 days
3	Ioan Ioniță	General of the Army; Ioan Ioniță	29 October 1966	16 June 1976	9 years, 231 days
4	Ion Coman	Colonel General; Ion Coman	16 June 1976	29 March 1980	3 years, 287 days
5	Constantin Olteanu	Colonel General; Constantin Olteanu	29 March 1980	16 December 1985	5 years, 262 days
6	Vasile Milea	Colonel General; Vasile Milea	16 December 1985	22 December 1989	4 years, 6 days

=== Chief of the General Staff ===
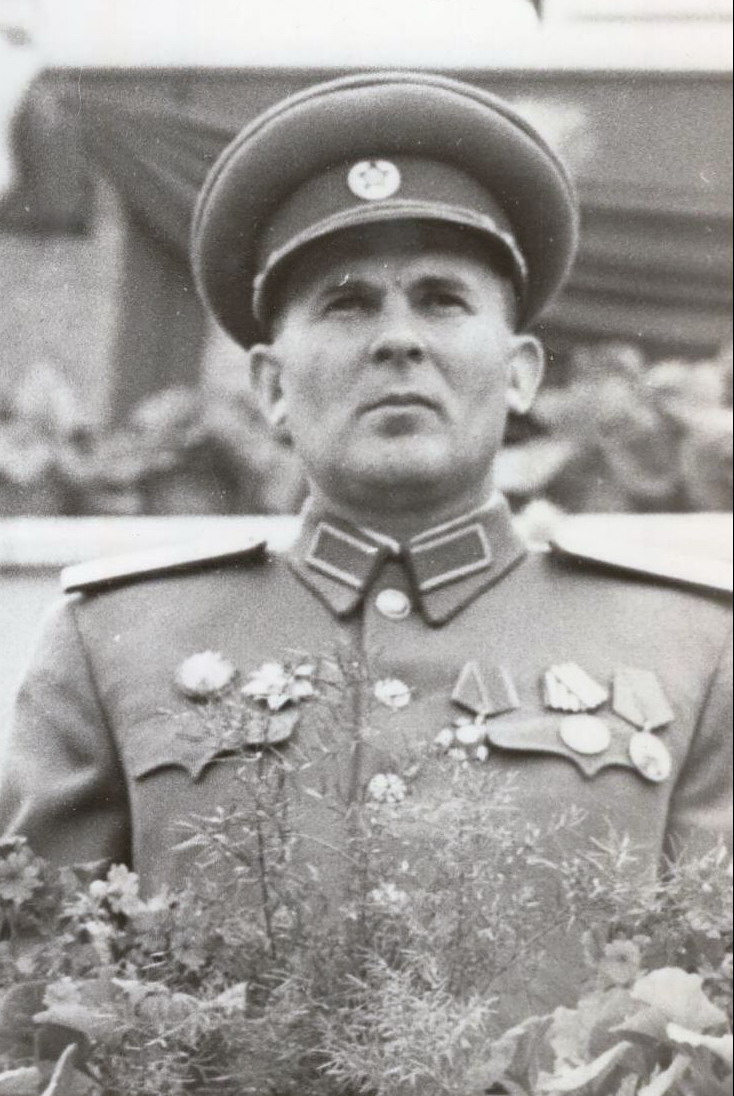
Sălăjan on May Day in 1953. Sălăjan served as the second Chief of the General Staff and the second Minister of National Defence

No.	Portrait	Chief of the General Staff	Took office	Left office	Time in office
33	Constantin Popescu	Colonel General; Constantin Popescu (1893–?)	30 January 1948	18 March 1950	2 years, 47 days
34	Leontin Sălăjan	General of the Army; Leontin Sălăjan (1913–1966)	18 March 1950	26 April 1954	4 years, 39 days
35	Ion Tutoveanu	General; Ion Tutoveanu (1914–2014)	26 April 1954	15 June 1965	11 years, 50 days
36	Ion Gheorghe [ro]	General; Ion Gheorghe (1923–2009)	15 June 1965	29 November 1974	9 years, 167 days
37	Ion Coman	Lieutenant General; Ion Coman (born 1926)	29 November 1974	16 June 1976	1 year, 200 days
38	Ion Hortopan [ro]	Lieutenant General; Ion Hortopan (1925–2000)	1 July 1976	31 March 1980	3 years, 274 days
39	Vasile Milea	Colonel General; Vasile Milea (1927–1989)	31 March 1980	16 February 1985	4 years, 322 days
40	Ștefan Gușă	Colonel General; Ștefan Gușă (1940–1994)	25 September 1986	28 December 1989	3 years, 97 days

== Components ==
As of 1985, the Army was organized into the following service branches:

- Ground Forces (Forțele Terestre)
- Air Forces (Forțele Aeriene)
- Navy (Marina)

Several other branches were not part of the Ministry of National Defense but were directly controlled by the Romanian Army or the PCR:

- Patriotic Guards (Gărzile Patriotice)
- Security Troops (Trupele de securitate)
- Border Troops (Trupele de frontieră)

A distinctive feature of the system of manning the RAF armed forces was the continued possibility of conscription of women for military service (although the bulk of the female military personnel serving at that time were doctors, nurses, and radio communications operators).

The Army active personnel amounted to the following numbers:

Branch	Size
Ground Forces	125,000
Navy	5,000
Air Force	8,000
Total	138,000 officers and troops

From 1947 to 1960, the military was organized into three military regions: Western (based in Cluj), Eastern (based in Bacău), and South (based in Bucharest). Succeeded by army corps in the 1960s, they were areas that in wartime would become an army corps with their headquarters acting as areas of responsibility.

=== Ground Forces ===
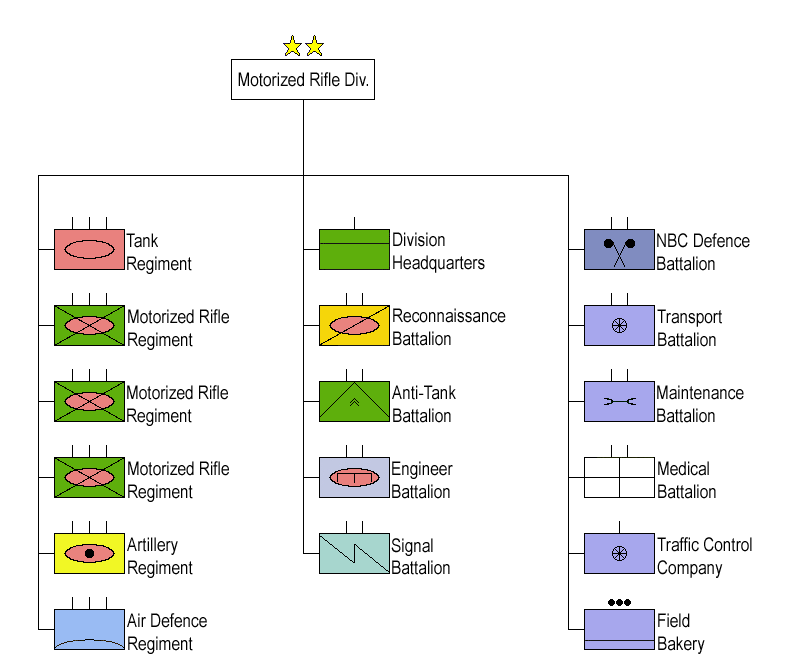
A graphic of the structure of a Romanian Ground Forces Motor Rifle Division

The senior units in the ground forces were the Tudor Vladimirescu Division and the Horia, Cloșca și Crișan Division, both of which were used as political tools by communist leaders. They were composed of former prisoners of war, Soviet trainees, and Communist activists such as Valter Roman.

In 1980, the Romanian Ground Forces were reorganized in 4 Army Commands:

- 1st Army Command (Bucharest)
- 2nd Army Command (Buzău)
- 3rd Army Command (Craiova)
- 4th Army Command (Cluj-Napoca)

All four Army Commands consisted of 8 Mechanized Infantry Divisions, 2 Armoured Divisions, 1 Armoured Brigade, 4 Mountain infantry Brigades as specialized motorized infantry units, and an administrative division of 4 parachute infantry regiments. Between 1960 and 1964, the rifle/mechanized divisions were converted to mechanized infantry (motorized rifle) divisions, which resulted in reductions in size due to the merger of both types of units. The newly established mechanized infantry divisions were structured similarly to the Soviet ones, organized into a division HQ, three mechanized infantry regiments, a tank regiment, and a field artillery regiment, as well as battalion-size subunits of other specialties, while the armoured divisions were structured in three tank regiments, a mechanized infantry regiment, a field artillery regiment and several other battalion-size subunits of different specialities.

The degree of mechanization of the infantry was not complete, unlike the other member states of the Warsaw Pact, for in 1985 only two of the three infantry battalions from the composition of the mechanized regiments were equipped with wheeled armoured personnel carriers TAB-71 and TAB-77. Even though since 1985, the infantry regiments began receiving new amphibious tracked infantry fighting vehicles MLI-84, the mechanization of the whole infantry had not succeeded until 1989.

Disbanded by the Soviets in the early years of occupied and post-war Romania, the Vânători de munte (Mountain Huntsmen) was re-established in 1958. It was the equivalent of the Soviet 7th Guards Mountain Air Assault Division or the American 10th Mountain Division. Due to its equipment comprising MLVM APCs and 76mm mounted guns, it was considered the Ground Forces' best-trained unit. It was organized into four brigades stationed in mountainous areas.

=== Navy ===
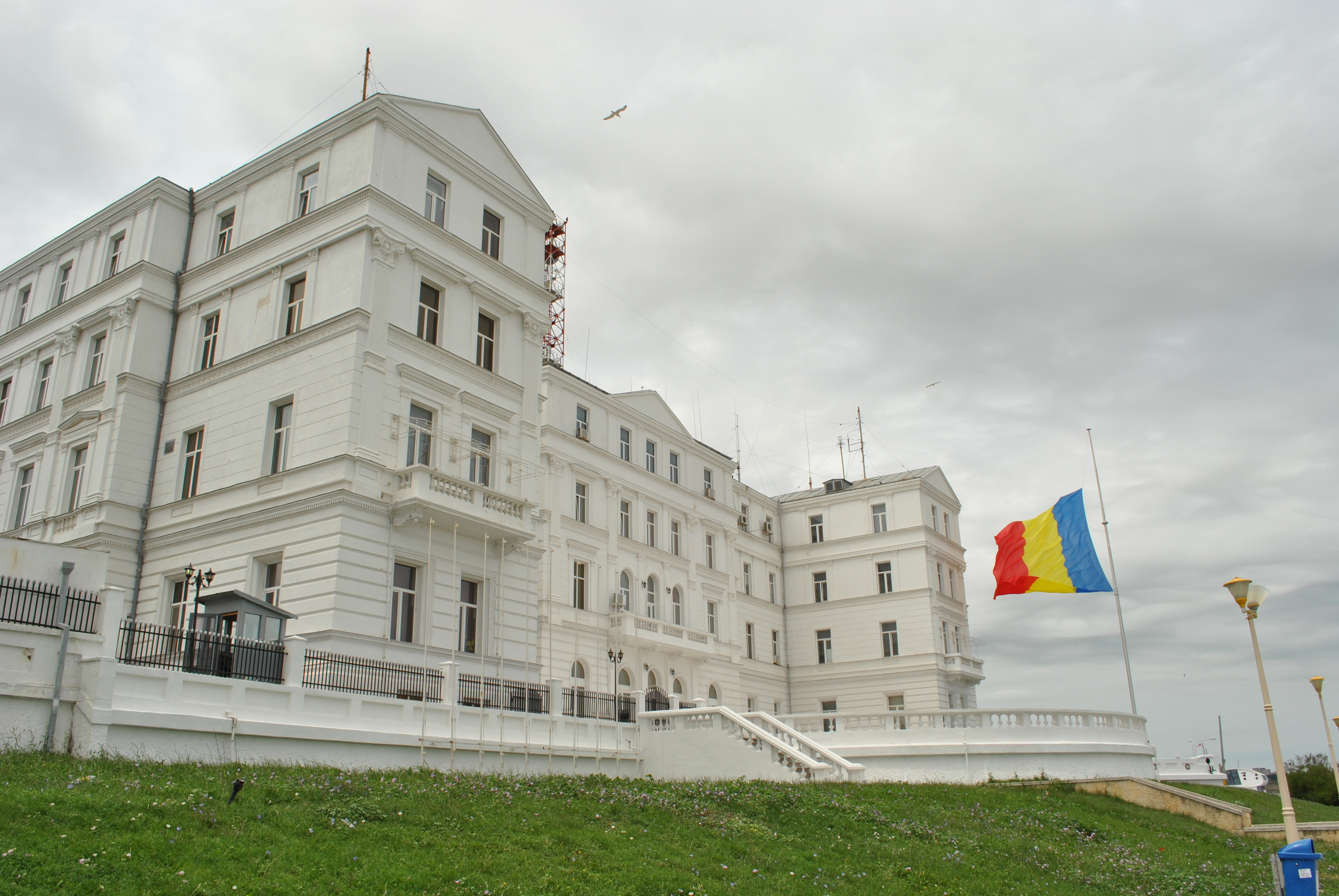
The Naval Building in Constanța served as the headquarters for the Navy

In the early postwar years, the Romanian Navy was deprived of its merchant fleet due to the rapid takeover of the Romanian vessels by the Soviet Navy. In September 1944, the Soviet Navy transferred all Romanian warships to ports in the Caucasus near Azerbaijan and Georgia, all of which were not returned until just over a year later, with the exception o the Regele Ferdinand-class that was kept by the Black Sea Fleet until the early 1950s. Several warships such as Amiral Murgescu were never returned and stayed in Soviet service until they were decommissioned. Once possessing patrol ships, the Romanian Navy formed the Danube Squadron, which later changed its name to the River Brigade in 1959. As a result of the 1940s reform of the naval forces, a patrol squadron was converted into an independent unit, which operated under the Naval Headquarters until May 1951. Four years later, naval ships and Marine units were subordinated to the headquarters.

In 1962, the 42nd Maritime Division was founded, continuing the traditions of the Sea Division, a large unit that had ceased to carry out functions since the end of World War II. In the late 70s and early 80s, several naval ships were built in the Romanian shipyards, specifically the Midia and Constanța escort ships from the Brăila shipyard. In the early 1980s, the Navy ramped up efforts to develop its domestic naval industry by building new patrol boats using Chinese and Soviet technology and designs. In 1989, the Romanian Navy had more than 7,500 sailors, all organized into the Black Sea Fleet, the Danube Squadron, and the Coastal Defense. Its major naval bases and shipyards were the ports of Mangalia and Constanța on the Black Sea. Based in Constanța, the 2,000-member Coastal Defense Regiment was the shore-based component of defense against attack from the Black Sea.

=== Air Force ===
Flag of the Air Force of Romania, 1952–1965

In 1946, following a reorganization, the Air Force consisted of seven Air Flotillas, of which two were fighter flotillas and the rest were bombardment, assault, information, and transport. A total of 953 aircraft were in service; these included both pre-war and WW2 models like the Bf 109G, IAR 80, IAR 37, Ju 88, etc.

Following a condition imposed during the Paris Peace Treaties of 1947, the strength of the military aviation of Romania was reduced to 150 aircraft, of which 100 were for combat and the rest for training. On 15 February 1949, the Romanian Aviation Command was established following the Soviet model of aviation regiments instead of the British squadron model. On 1 April 1950, the air force arm was officially named the Military Air Forces (Forțele Aeriene Militare).

The first jet fighters arrived in 1951, with the first Jet Air Division (Divizia Aeriană Reactivă) being established on 1 April of the same year, at Ianca. The unit was equipped with Soviet-made Yak-23 and Yak-17 fighters and had three Regiments (the 11th, 12th, and 13th). The 97th Jet Fighter Aviation Division was declared combat ready on 15 September 1951. The first interception mission was carried out on the night of 28/29 October 1952, when a Soviet Il-28 bomber entered Romanian airspace unauthorized. The first MiG-15s also entered service in 1952. These aircraft were first in use with the Soviet Regiments deployed at Craiova and Deveselu and were transferred to the Romanian Air Force in September 1952. The first supersonic flight happened on 5 March 1958, with a MiG-19 at the Deveselu Air Base.

In 1969, an air defence unit was created to protect against air attacks, while a paratrooper regiment was founded in 1980, both of which were assigned to the Câmpia Turzii Air Base (now the RoAF 71st Air Base). A Romanian-made IAR-93 attack aircraft flew its first flight on 31 October 1974 over Bacău, marking the first jet fighter in the Eastern Bloc to be domestically manufactured. The Mikoyan MiG-29 aircraft entered the inventory of the Air Force just a few days before the Romanian Revolution of December 1989.

=== Patriotic Guards ===
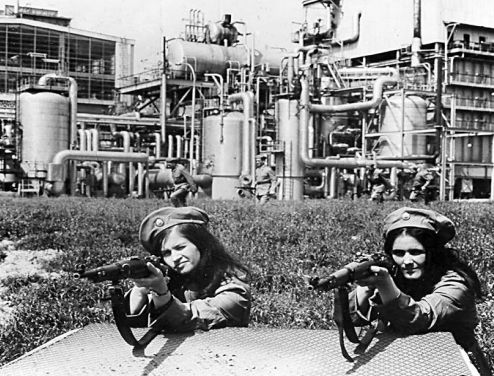
Two patriotic guardswomen training near an industrial park

Formed in 1968 after Ceaușescu's speech of 21 August 1968, the Romanian Patriotic Guards was an organization dedicated to public security, with its functions including civil policing to an active reserve for the Army. During wartime, the President of the Republic could authorize the guards to become a large "Militia" that would provide military police-style security, as well as augment the ground forces, and operate as guerrillas forces. The force was not part of the Ministry of National Defence but was a direct reporting unit of the PCR and the Union of Communist Youth, of which it drafted members of both. Members of the guards were considered territorial troops (Forțele teritoriale), as they were organized into companies and/or platoons and were based in every județ, municipality, and industrial/agricultural area under the command of the first secretary of the local PCR.

=== Securitate Troops ===
On 23 January 1949, the communist government disbanded the Royal Romanian Gendarmerie only to purge its personnel and redistribute them to the newly created Directorate for Security Troops (DTO) of the Securitate (Department of State Security), modeled after the NKVD's Internal Troops and the KGB. It acted as a 20,000-strong elite paramilitary force consisting of select people drawn from the Army's conscript pool. It was organized into infantry units equipped with small arms, artillery, and armored personnel carriers. The security troops were directly responsible to the Minister of the Interior and the Supreme Commander-in-Chief, allowing them to guard important installations, including PCR office buildings and state radio and television stations.

The regime of Ceaușescu could have theoretically called in the security troops as a private army to prevent a military coup d'état and/or suppress antiregime riots. It operated under a more strict discipline and routine than the regular military, which resulted in their special treatment and enjoyment of better living conditions than their counterparts. In late 1989, the directorate was disbanded and replaced first by the Guard and Order Troops (Trupele de Pază și Ordine) and later on by the reformed Gendarmerie.

== Equipment ==
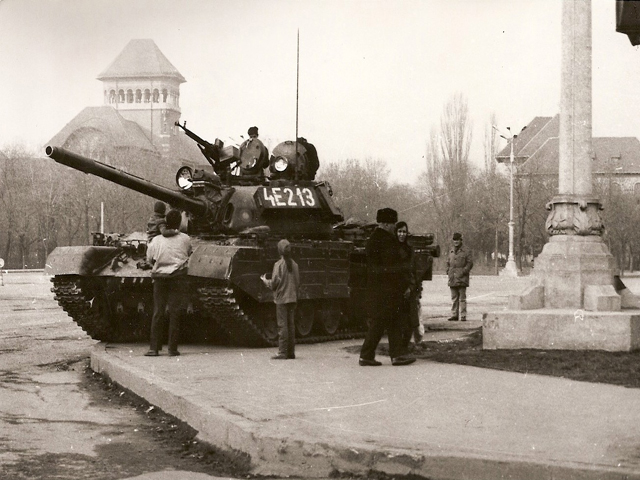
A TR-85 tank in Bucharest during the Romanian Revolution of 1989.

Weapon	Origin	Type	Notes	Photo
TTC	Soviet Union Socialist Republic of Romania	Semi-automatic pistol	TT-33 pistol produced in Romania under TTC designation.	
Pistol Carpați Md. 1974	Socialist Republic of Romania	Semi-automatic pistol	Standard issue pistol.	
Orița M1941	Kingdom of Romania	Submachine gun	Used by the Patriotic Guards until the 1970s.	
Pistol Mitralieră model 1963/1965	Soviet Union Socialist Republic of Romania	Assault rifle	Standard issue until the 1980s when it was replaced by Pușcă Automată model 1986	
Pușcă Automată model 1986	Soviet Union Socialist Republic of Romania	Assault rifle	Ment to replace Pistol Mitralieră model 1963/1965.	
PM md. 64	Soviet Union Socialist Republic of Romania	Light machine gun		
ZB vz. 30	Czechoslovakia Socialist Republic of Romania	Light machine gun	Produced under license. Used by the Patriotic Guards.	
Mitralieră md. 66	Socialist Republic of Romania Soviet Union	General purpose machinegun	Copy of PK machine gun	
PSL	Socialist Republic of Romania	Designated sniper rifle	Standard marksman rifle .	
SKS M56	Soviet Union Socialist Republic of Romania	Semi-automatic rifle	Produced under license.	
RPG-2	Soviet Union	Light AT weapon		
RPG-7	Soviet Union	Light AT weapon		
Mosin–Nagant	Russian Empire Soviet Union	Bolt-action rifle		
vz. 24	Czechoslovakia	Bolt-action rifle	Used by the Patriotic Guards.	

=== Armored fighting vehicles ===
Tank	Origin	Type	In service	Notes
T-34	Soviet Union	85	1,053	
T-55	Soviet Union	AM, AM2	756	
TR-85	Socialist Republic of Romania		617	
TR-850	Socialist Republic of Romania		413	
T-72	Soviet Union	M	30	
SU-76	Soviet Union		326	
SU-100	Soviet Union		66	
ISU-152	Soviet Union		20	

IFV/APC	Origin	Type	In service	Notes
MLI-84	Socialist Republic of Romania	IFV	154	
BTR-40	Soviet Union	APC	26	
BTR-50	Soviet Union	APC	35	
BTR-60	Soviet Union	APC	50	
TAB-71	Socialist Republic of Romania	APC	1,870	
TAB-77	Socialist Republic of Romania	APC	155	
TABC-79	Socialist Republic of Romania	APC	441	
MLVM	Socialist Republic of Romania	APC	53	
BRDM-2	Soviet Union	Reconnaissancel Vehicle	139	
TAB-80	Socialist Republic of Romania	Reconnaissancel Vehicle	8	

=== Air Force ===
Model	Origin	Type	In service	Notes
MiG-21	Soviet Union	Fighter	300	
MiG-23	Soviet Union	Fighter	46	
IAR-93	Socialist Republic of Romania	Ground attack	86	
IAR 99	Socialist Republic of Romania	Trainer	90	
L-29 Delfín	Czechoslovakia	Trainer	52	
L-39 Albatros	Czechoslovakia	Trainer	32	
Ilyushin Il-28	Soviet Union	Bomber	11	Replaced by the Harbin H-5 in 1972
Harbin H-5	China	Bomber	16	
Antonov An-24	Soviet Union	Transport	12	
Antonov An-26	Soviet Union	Transport	16	
IAR 330	Socialist Republic of Romania	Helicopter	60	
IAR 316	Socialist Republic of Romania	Helicopter	136	
Mil Mi-8	Soviet Union	Helicopter	39	
S-75 Dvina	Soviet Union	SAM	N/A	
S-125 Neva/Pechora	Soviet Union	SAM	N/A	
9K33 Osa	Soviet Union	SAM	N/A	
9K31 Strela-1	Soviet Union	SAM	N/A	

=== Artillery ===
Total: 3,707

Model	Origin	Type	Notes
M 1988	Socialist Republic of Romania	60 mm mortar	
M 1977	Socialist Republic of Romania	82 mm mortar	
M 1982	Socialist Republic of Romania	120 mm mortar	
240 mm mortar M240	Soviet Union	240 mm mortar	
Reșița Model 1943	Kingdom of Romania	75 mm anti-tank gun	
ZiS-3	Soviet Union	76 mm anti-tank gun	
D-44	Soviet Union	85 mm anti-tank gun	
D-48	Soviet Union	85 mm anti-tank gun	
BS-3	Soviet Union	100 mm anti-tank gun	
M1977	Socialist Republic of Romania	100 mm anti-tank gun	
Model 1936 Schneider	France	105 mm towed gun	Used for training.
M1982	Socialist Republic of Romania	130 mm towed gun	
M30M	Socialist Republic of Romania	122 mm howitzer	
Skoda M34	Czechoslovakia	150 mm howitzer	
M1981	Socialist Republic of Romania	152 mm howitzer	
M1985	Socialist Republic of Romania	152 mm howitzer	
2S1 Gvozdika	Soviet Union	122 mm self-propelled howitzer	
BM-21 Grad	Soviet Union	122 mm multiple rocket launcher	
APR-40	Socialist Republic of Romania	122 mm multiple rocket launcher	
R-11 Zemlya	Soviet Union	Tactical ballistic missile	
R-17 Elbrus	Soviet Union	Tactical ballistic missile	
2K6 Luna	Soviet Union	Tactical ballistic missile	
9K52 Luna-M	Soviet Union	Tactical ballistic missile	

=== Navy ===
Ships:

- (Soviet Union) Poti-class corvette
- (Soviet Union) Kronshtadt-class submarine chaser
- (Soviet Union) Osa-class missile boat
- (China) Type 025 torpedo boat
- (Socialist Republic of Romania) Epitrop class fast attack craft
- (China) Type 062 gunboat
- (Socialist Republic of Romania) Cosar class minelayer
- (Socialist Republic of Romania) Democrația-class minesweeper

In the early 1990s, the equipment for major units were scrapped due to age and the cost of maintenance.

== See also ==
- Korean People's Army
- Nationale Volksarmee
- Polish People's Army
- Czechoslovak People's Army
- Hungarian People's Army
- Bulgarian People's Army
- Albanian People's Army
- List of wars involving Romania
