= Bujoreni =

Bujoreni may refer to several places in Romania:

- Bujoreni, Teleorman
- Bujoreni, Vâlcea
- Bujoreni, a village in Buzoești Commune, Argeș County
