= Leontin Sălăjan =

Romanian communist military and political leader (1913–1966)

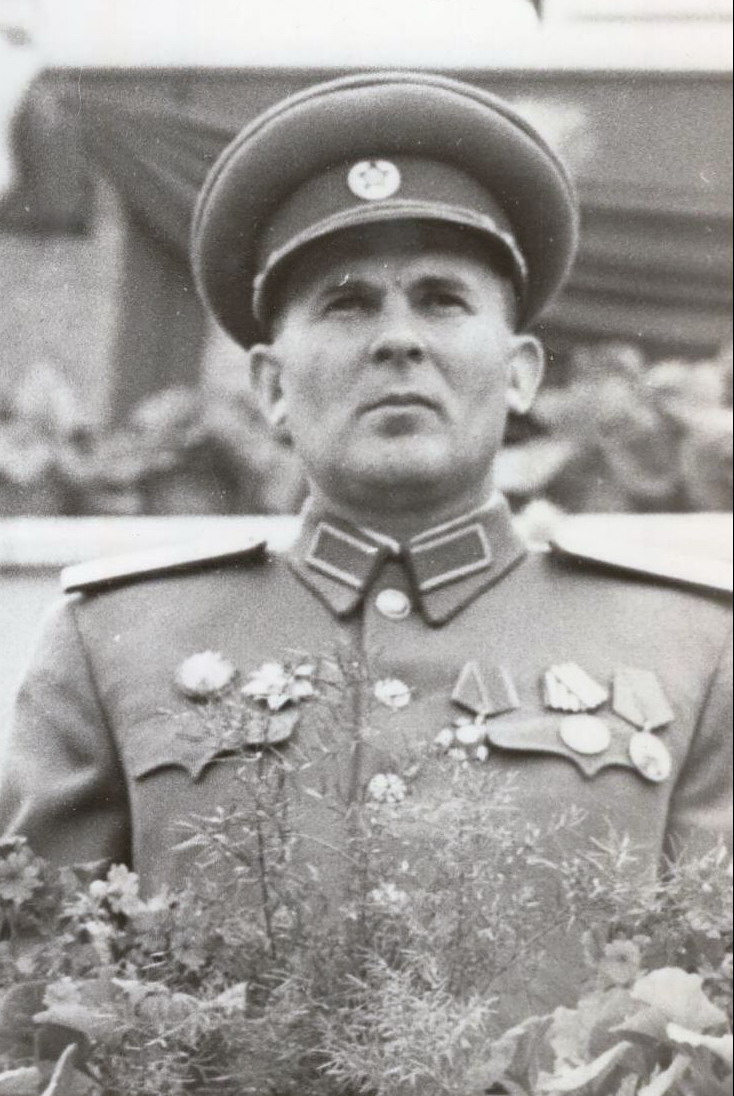
- Sălăjan on May Day, 1953

Chief of the Romanian General Staff
- In office 18 March 1950 – 26 April 1954
- Preceded by: Constantin Gh. Popescu
- Succeeded by: Ion Tutoveanu

Deputy Minister of Health
- In office 1948–1949

Minister of Constructions
- In office 24 September 1949 – 17 March 1950

Minister of the Armed Forces
- In office 3 October 1955 – 28 August 1966
- Preceded by: Emil Bodnăraș
- Succeeded by: Ioan Ioniță

Personal details
- Born: Szilágyi Ignác; 19 June 1913 Tasnádszántó, Austria-Hungary (now Santău, Romania)
- Died: 28 August 1966 (aged 53) Bucharest, Romania
- Party: Romanian Communist Party

Military service
- Allegiance: Romania
- Branch/service: Romanian Army
- Years of service: 1934 – 28 August 1966
- Rank: General of the Army

Leontin Sălăjan (Hungarian: Szilágyi Ignác; 19 June 1913 – 28 August 1966) was a Romanian communist military and political leader.

Born in Santău Commune, Satu Mare County (then in Szilágy County, Austria-Hungary), he was of Hungarian ethnicity, a locksmith by training. In 1934, he was recruited into the military engineering branch of the Romanian Army, performing his military service in a broadcasting regiment. He joined the banned Romanian Communist Party in 1939, belonging to its Transylvanian faction and holding positions in its Banat structures. In 1948, following the establishment of a Communist regime, he became deputy Health Minister, followed by a stint in 1949-1950 as Constructions Minister. In 1950, despite his limited military experience, he was promoted to army general and named Chief of the Romanian General Staff, holding the office until 1954. He was made Armed Forces Minister in 1955, holding the position until his death. While in this office, he was a close ally of Nicolae Ceaușescu, alongside whom he sat on a high command during the Hungarian Revolution of 1956, charged with suppressing unrest by any means necessary, including ordering security forces to open fire.

Within the party, he was a member of the central committee from 1945, and with Ceaușescu's rise to general secretary in 1965, he first became alternate member of the politburo and then member of the executive committee. He died after a failed ulcer operation. High-level investigations followed, identifying it as a likely case of medical malpractice, though the results were not made public.

Sălăjan was elected to the Assembly of Deputies for Sălaj County in 1946 and obtained a Sălăj seat in the Great National Assembly (MAN) in 1948, holding it until 1952. Later, he sat for Arad from 1952 to 1957 and for Oradea from 1957 until his death. In 1963, he was awarded the Order of the Star of the Romanian People's Republic, first class.
