= Lucian Pahonțu =

Lucian-Silvan Pahonțu
- Born: November 2, 1964 (age 61); Lerești, Argeș County, Romania
- Education: Active Signal Officers Military School; Carol I National Defence University
- Military career
- Allegiance: Romania
- Branch: Gendarmerie; Protection and Guard Service
- Service years: 1987–2024 (active service); 2024–present (reserve)
- Rank: General (4-star)
- Commands: Protection and Guard Service (Director, 2005–present); Vlad Țepeș Special Intervention Brigade (2002–2005)
- Conflicts: Romanian Revolution
- Awards: Grand Officer of the Order of the Star of Romania

Lucian-Silvan Pahonțu (born 2 November 1964) is a reserve Romanian general who has served as the director of the Protection and Guard Service (SPP) since 7 December 2005.

== Biography ==
Pahonțu was born on 2 November 1964 in the village of Lerești, Argeș County. According to family sources cited in an investigation by Recorder, his father was a first cousin of General Vasile Milea, Minister of National Defense during the communist regime.

He graduated from the Active Signal Officers Military School in Sibiu in 1987 and the Faculty of Combined Arms at the Carol I National Defence University in 1994, later attending leadership courses for the Gendarmerie in 1992 and 1998. In 2003, he earned a PhD in military sciences and published the volume Terorism și destabilizare ("Terrorism and Destabilization") at Bioterra Publishing House, where he argued that the Securitate and Militia structures dissolved after 1989 became targets of violent actions by groups of "revolutionaries."

=== Military career and SPP directorship ===
After 1987, he began his career within the Ministry of Internal Affairs, serving as a platoon commander (1987–1990) and company commander (1990–1992). He later served as Chief of Staff of the 11th Mobile Gendarmerie Brigade Bucharest between 1999 and 2002, and commanded the Vlad Țepeș Special Intervention Brigade of the Gendarmerie from 2002 to 2005.

During his military career, he was promoted to brigadier general on 1 December 2003, subsequently reaching the ranks of major general, lieutenant general on 25 April 2008, and later four-star general.

On 7 December 2005, he was appointed director of the Protection and Guard Service (SPP) by presidential decree under President Traian Băsescu, becoming the longest-serving head of a Romanian intelligence service. In this role, he led the institution through the presidential administrations of Traian Băsescu, Klaus Iohannis, and Nicușor Dan. Upon reaching the age of 60 on 2 November 2024, he was transferred to the military reserve by decree signed by President Klaus Iohannis, while continuing to head the SPP as a civilian.

== Controversies and career investigations ==
=== Role during the 1989 Revolution and 1990 events ===
A investigative report published by Recorder in 2026 revealed that from 1987 to 1990, Pahonțu served as a platoon commander in UM 0305 Băneasa, a unit belonging to the Security Troops under the Department of State Security.

On the night of 21–22 December 1989, Pahonțu's platoon was deployed to the security perimeter around the Intercontinental Hotel (13 Decembrie Street). In a statement given during investigations into the 1989 Revolution, Pahonțu confirmed his presence in the area until approximately 02:00, but maintained that his subunit had no direct contact with demonstrators. However, testimonies from other soldiers in the same unit and contemporary reports indicate violent clashes between security forces and protesters at the barricade. The investigation did not allege that Pahonțu personally fired weapons, but emphasized his presence within the repressive apparatus of the communist regime.

Following the reorganization of the Security Troops into Guard and Order Troops, UM 0305 Băneasa participated in the clearing of University Square during the June 1990 Mineriad (13–15 June 1990). Statements provided to military prosecutors by a former colleague placed Pahonțu in the operational area on 13 and 14 June. When asked to comment, Pahonțu did not elaborate on specific missions, stating only that his entire activity was conducted "in accordance with legal standards." Access to official documents from the period remained restricted by the Ministry of Internal Affairs and the Gendarmerie, and the National Council for the Study of the Securitate Archives (CNSAS) had not issued an official determination as of August 2026.

=== Plagiarism in PhD thesis ===
According to an analysis by the Romanian news outlet Recorder, at least 30% (52 pages) of the doctoral thesis Pahonțu defended in 2003 was plagiarized. The investigation revealed that he compiled military manuals, publications of his superiors in the Ministry of Internal Affairs, and communist regime regulations without proper citation. Furthermore, the text contains numerous technical and grammatical errors, and a subsequent book based on the thesis includes controversial comments minimizing the victims of the 1991 Mineriada Riot and communist repression. Despite these irregularities and the thesis's role in his career advancement, both Pahonțu and Romania's political leadership have avoided taking responsibility.

=== Public allegations and political reactions ===
In January 2007, SPP Colonel Mircea Găinușă publicly accused Pahonțu of hailing from former repressive structures and recruiting similar personnel into the SPP. Pahonțu rejected the accusations, claiming he had only been a platoon commander of conscripts in signal units. Nevertheless, subsequent investigations noted that his official SPP biography omitted explicit mention of his service in the Security Troops.

Pahonțu has also faced political allegations regarding institutional overreach. In 2018, PSD leader Liviu Dragnea accused him of using SPP resources to gather intelligence and exert influence over political and government figures, linking him to the concept of a "parallel state." These statements were not substantiated by judicial findings.

Reflecting broader debates over the length of tenure for intelligence agency leadership, President Nicușor Dan stated in June 2025 that he intended to evaluate the operation of such institutions. Following the publication of the 2026 media investigation, Dan clarified that he did not consider the situation a scandal and had not conducted a special managerial evaluation.

The media accusations regarding Pahonțu’s military past were followed by a series of denials from him and contradictory evidence published by the Recorder. While Pahonțu claimed that his logistic support subunit was merely stationed without ammunition and that the soldiers under his command did not leave the barracks during the events of 1989 and 1990, Recorder cited from the Revolution File testimonies of his former superior and subordinates indicating his direct location at the Intercontinental barricade and the participation of his troops in the Mineriad of June 13-14. Despite the judicial documents presented, the SPP head rejected the accusations and supported his activity by invoking the international partnerships of the institution he leads.

== See also ==
- Protection and Guard Service
- Romanian Revolution
- June 1990 Mineriad
- Vasile Milea
- Gendarmerie (Romania)
