= Prunaru =

Prunaru may refer to several villages in Romania:

- Prunaru, a village in Prunișor Commune, Mehedinți County
- Prunaru, a village in Bujoreni Commune, Teleorman County
