= August 23 Order =

Romanian decoration

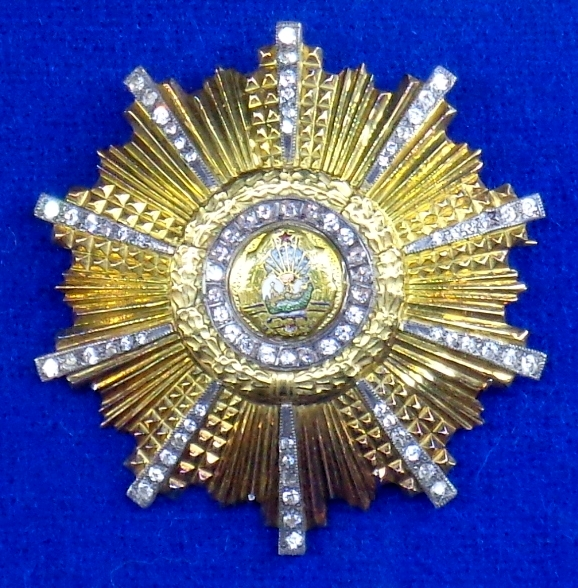
August 23 Order, 1st class

The August 23 Order (Romanian: Ordinul "23 August") was a Romanian decoration established by decree No. 190 of the State Council of Romania on 3 June 1959. It was created to commemorate the events of 23 August 1944 and the participants in King Michael's Coup. Subsequently, it was granted to military and civilian personnel, as well as Romanian and foreign officials.

== Recipients ==
- Ion Tutoveanu
- Ion Iliescu
- Nicolae Ceaușescu
- Corneliu Baba
- Emil Petrovic
