= Type 027 torpedo boat =

Family of Chinese torpedo boats

Class overview
- Operators: People's Liberation Army Navy
- Preceded by: Type 025
- Subclasses: 027, 027II, 027B

General characteristics
- Type: Torpedo boat
- Displacement: 99.31 tonnes (97.74 long tons; 109.47 short tons)
- Length: 28.445 m (93 ft 3.9 in)
- Beam: 3.383 m (11 ft 1.2 in)
- Depth: 6.2 m (20 ft 4 in)
- Installed power: Internal combustion engine
- Propulsion: 42 -160 Diesel engine, 8,000 hp (5,966 kW) ea
- Speed: 34 knots (63 km/h; 39 mph)
- Range: 500 mi (800 km)
- Complement: 18
- Sensors & processing systems: 1 × navigational/surface search radar
- Armament: 4 533.4 mm (21.00 in) torpedoes; 37 mm (1.5 in) guns; 12.7 mm (0.50 in) guns

The Type 027 torpedo boat is a family of Chinese torpedo boats developed to replace Type 025 torpedo boat, and these boats have since retired from active service in the People's Liberation Army Navy (PLAN).

In 1966, PLAN decided to indigenously develop a new generation of large torpedo boat that is armed with four torpedo tubes. The large boat would have better sea keep capability than its smaller predecessors and because it is more heavily armed, less will be needed to achieve the same result in comparison when its smaller predecessors were deployed. The 701st Research Institute of the China Shipbuilding Industry Corporation (CSIC, known as Warship Research Academy at the time) was assigned as the designer, and Wuzhou 449th Factory, the predecessor of China Guijiang Shipbuilding Co., Ltd. (中船桂江造船有限公司) was assigned to build the first unit. Construction begun in 1971 and the boat was launched in 1974, and turned over to PLAN in 1976, and is designated as Type 027.

Two year after the delivery of the first boat, the 701st Institute modified design and this time, Wuhu Shipyard (芜湖造船厂), the predecessor of Wuhu Xinlian Shipbuilding Co., Ltd. (芜湖新联造船有限公司) was assigned to build this improved version designated as Type 027II. The new boat differs from the first boat in the material used: Type 027II uses the new Type 903 steel that reduces the overall weight by a ton. Construction begun on June 19, 1979, and in September 1980, launching and subsequent sea trials were completed, proving the success of new design. Before the installation of subsystem, the design went yet another major upgrade, mostly in onboard electronics such fire control system, IFF and electrical control system of the propulsion. As a result, the installation of subsystem did not occur until June 1983, three years after the completion of the construction and sea trials of the hull. With most of its originally planned onboard subsystems of Type 027 replaced by newly developed systems, Type 027II is subsequently renamed as Type 027IIB.

Installation of new subsystems took three months, and the first Type 027IIB was launched on September 20, 1983, and from November 3 thru November 21 of that same year, the boat completed its trials in Yangtze River. On December 13, 1986, the boat reached Ningbo to conduct sea trials, which was completed after ten trials. On January 10, 1984, the first Type 027II was handed to PLAN. In October 1985, construction of the 2nd Type 027II begun. However, due to the advent of missile boats, the planned construction program of Type 027 series torpedo boats were cancelled. As a result, only three Type 027 series torpedo boats entered service with PLAN, one Type 027 and two Type 027B, all of which have been retired from active service by early 2010s.
