= Lerești =

- Commune
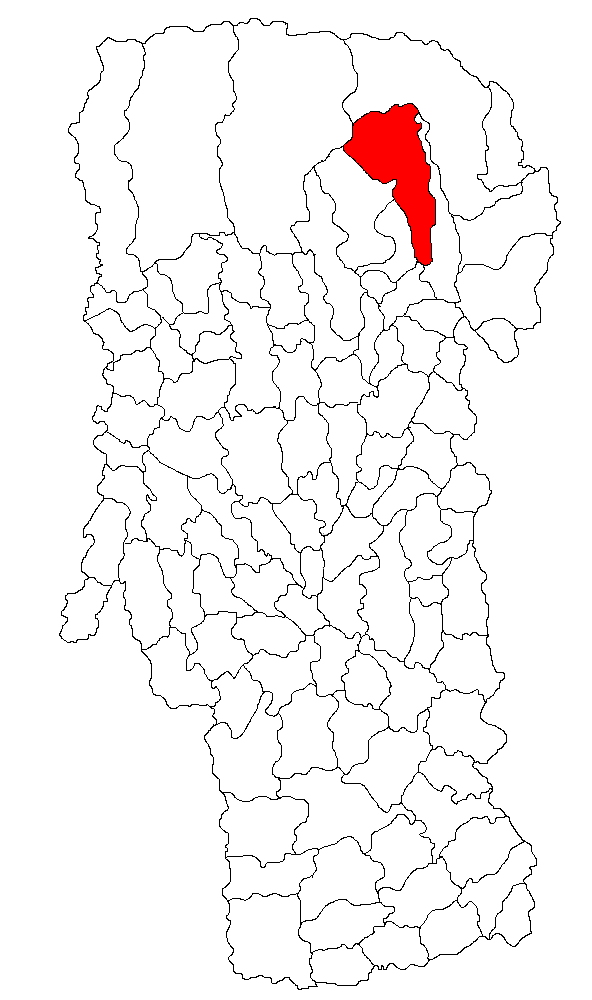
- Location in Argeș County

- Location in Romania
- Coordinates: 45°20′N 25°4′E
- Country: Romania
- County: Argeș

Government
  - Mayor (2024–2028): Marian Toader (PSD)
- Area: 140.49 km^{2} (54.24 sq mi)
- Elevation: 695 m (2,280 ft)
- Population (2021-12-01): 4,124
  - Density: 29.35/km^{2} (76.03/sq mi)
- Time zone: UTC+02:00 (EET)
  - Summer (DST): UTC+03:00 (EEST)
- Postal code: 117430
- Area code: +(40) 248
- Vehicle reg.: AG
- Website: www.cjarges.ro/en/web/leresti

Lerești is a commune in Argeș County, Muntenia, Romania. It is composed of three villages: Lerești, Pojorâta, and Voinești.

Historical population
Year	Pop.	±%
2002	5,024	—
2011	4,632	−7.8%
2021	4,124	−11.0%
Source: Census data

== Natives ==
- Vasile Milea (1927–1989), general and politician
- Lucian Pahonțu (born 1964), general
