= Protection and Guard Service =

Romanian government agency

- Romanian: Serviciul de Protecţie şi Pază
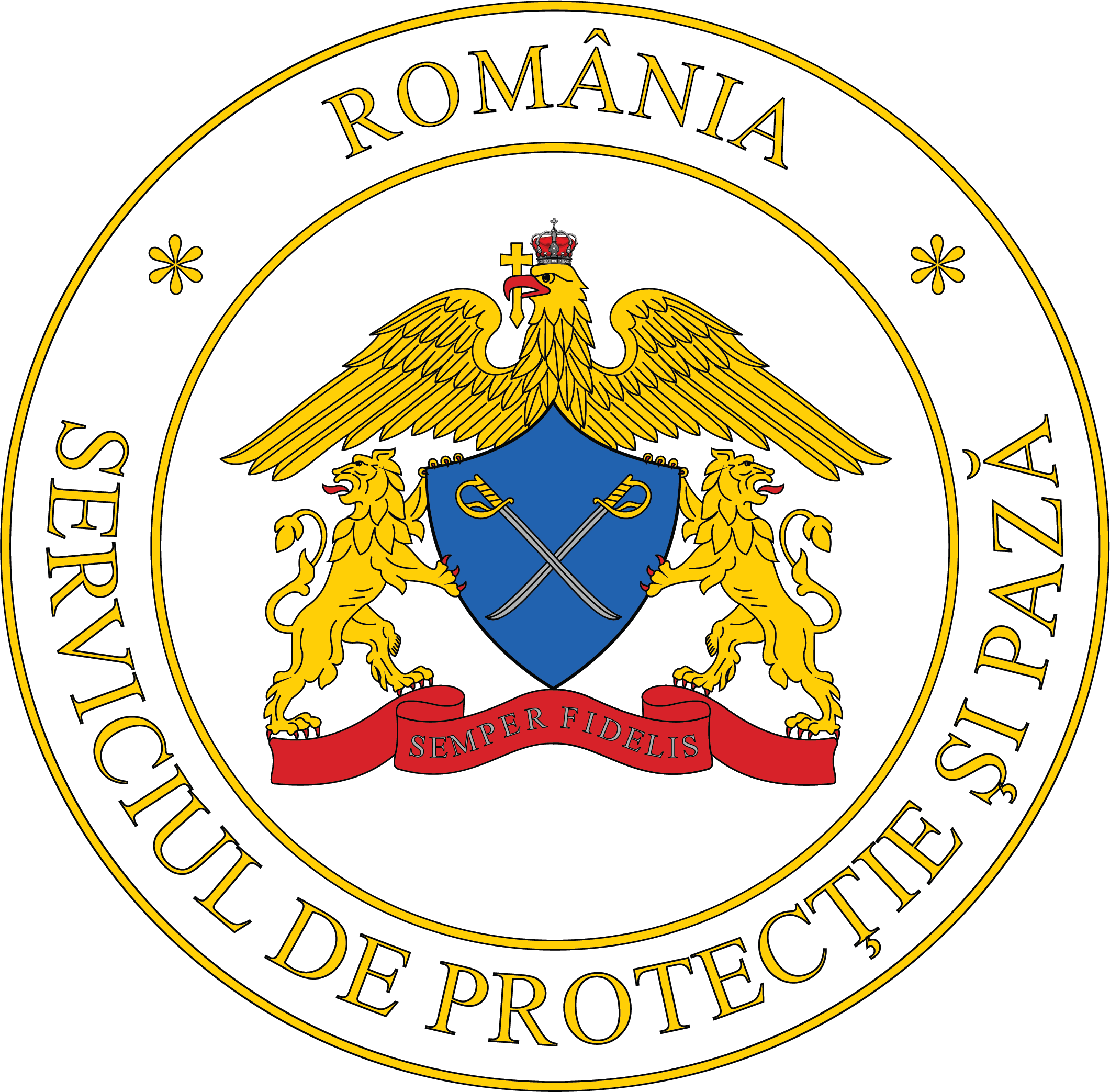

Agency overview
- Formed: 7 May 1990
- Headquarters: Bucharest
- Employees: Classified
- Annual budget: EUR 57.5 million (2020)
- Agency executive: Lucian Pahonțu, Director; Daniel Ion Bălașa, Deputy Director
- Website: www.spp.ro

Protection and Guard Service (Romanian: Serviciul de Protecţie şi Pază, abbreviated SPP) is the Romanian institution designated to protect and defend dignitaries, as well as their family or close relatives. The institution operates independently, although it collaborates closely with the Romanian Ministry of National Defense and other secret services. Its motto is Semper Fidelis.

== Structure ==
The Romanian Protection and Guard Service is divided into various departments and units:

- Director
  - Secretariat and Public Relations
  - Control Body
  - Human Resources
  - Internal Audit
  - Legal Office
  - Communication, Informatics, and Cybersecurity Structure
  - Deputy Director
    - Documentation and Internal Protection Structures
    - First Deputy Director
      - General Staff
      - Protection and Security Structures
      - Anti-Terrorist Protection and Intervention Structures
      - Transport Structure
      - Medical Structure and C.B.R.N.
    - Chief Financial Officer
      - Financial Structure
      - Logistics structure
      - Procurement Structure
      - Project Management
      - Labor Protection and P.S.I. Structure

== Activity ==
SPP is a vital institution for the national security. It operates under Law 191/1998. The institution and its employees are mainly required to:

- Defend dignitaries and their families, within legal limitations
- Defend diplomats and heads of state during their stay in Romania (including airspace, water and the additional islands)
- Defend the residences of the above-mentioned category
- Defend any premises in which the above-stated category is visiting

The institution must respect all laws, as well as the Constitution. The institution takes orders and fulfills requests given by the Supreme Council of National Defense.

== History ==
The institution has been officially operating since May 7, 1990. The concept of such a service came up right after the fall of the communist regime. On July 26, 1991, the agency received its current name from the Law on National Security of Romania. Many of its members from that time came from the Ministry of National Defense and Ministry of Internal Affairs (MIA). During 1992, the President of Romania frequently called upon the personnel of the Protection and Guard Service to carry out complex domestic and foreign operations. In 1994, the SPP took part in providing security to dignitaries taking part in the Crans Montana Forum that being held in Bucharest. In 1995, the Protection and Guard Service made a series of improvements regarding the training of management staff related to mission preparation and conduct of missions; as well as increasing the number of staff in the SPP.

In 1997, the Protection and Guard Service took part in providing security during visits by French President Jacques Chirac and United States President William Clinton. In 1998, the SPP went through restructuring in response to the Cigarette II Scandal. In 2004, the United Nations Department of Safety and Security (UNDSS) signed a memorandum with the Romanian Protection and Guard Service to have SPP assist in providing dignitaries from the United Nations with protection while they were carrying out operations in Sudan and Afghanistan. SPP carried out its first deployment in Sudan in 2004 when they sent eleven operators to Sudan to protect the UN dignitaries operating there. Since that time, twenty-five groups have been sent to UN Officials during operations in Libya, Sudan, and Afghanistan.

In 2008, the SPP assisted in proving security during the NATO summit in Bucharest. In August 2009, Romania became a partner of the United Nations in a joint program for training UN protection and security personnel in the area of direct protection; and signed a memorandum of understanding in New York. On March 22, 2010, the Center of Excellence for Protection and Security (Romanian: Centrul de Excelență pentru Protecție și Securitate, CEPS) of the Protection and Guard Service for the training of the United Nations Protection and Security Personnel was inaugurated in Bucharest. The UN chose Romania to establish this educational facility because efficiency the Romanian military has carried its missions to protect UN officials and the professionalism the Romanian personnel have shown in extreme circumstances during the time they spent operating in Afghanistan, Libya, and Sudan.

CEPS takes on recruits using individual applications from personnel currently tasked with executing protection missions in operational theaters. The recruits training is overseen by members of the Romanian Protection and Guard Service and United Nations Personnel, who have extensive training on militasry police and or security procedures and have experience performing direct protection, self-defense, and security techniques in areas where international operations and missions are happening. The training lasts for duration of four weeks.

== See also ==
- Secţia Intervenţii Anti-Teroriste, the special unit of the Protection and Guard Service
- 5th Directorate of the Securitate, the department of the Securitate charged with the same tasks during the communist regime
