= Constantin Olteanu (politician) =

Romanian communist politician and army general

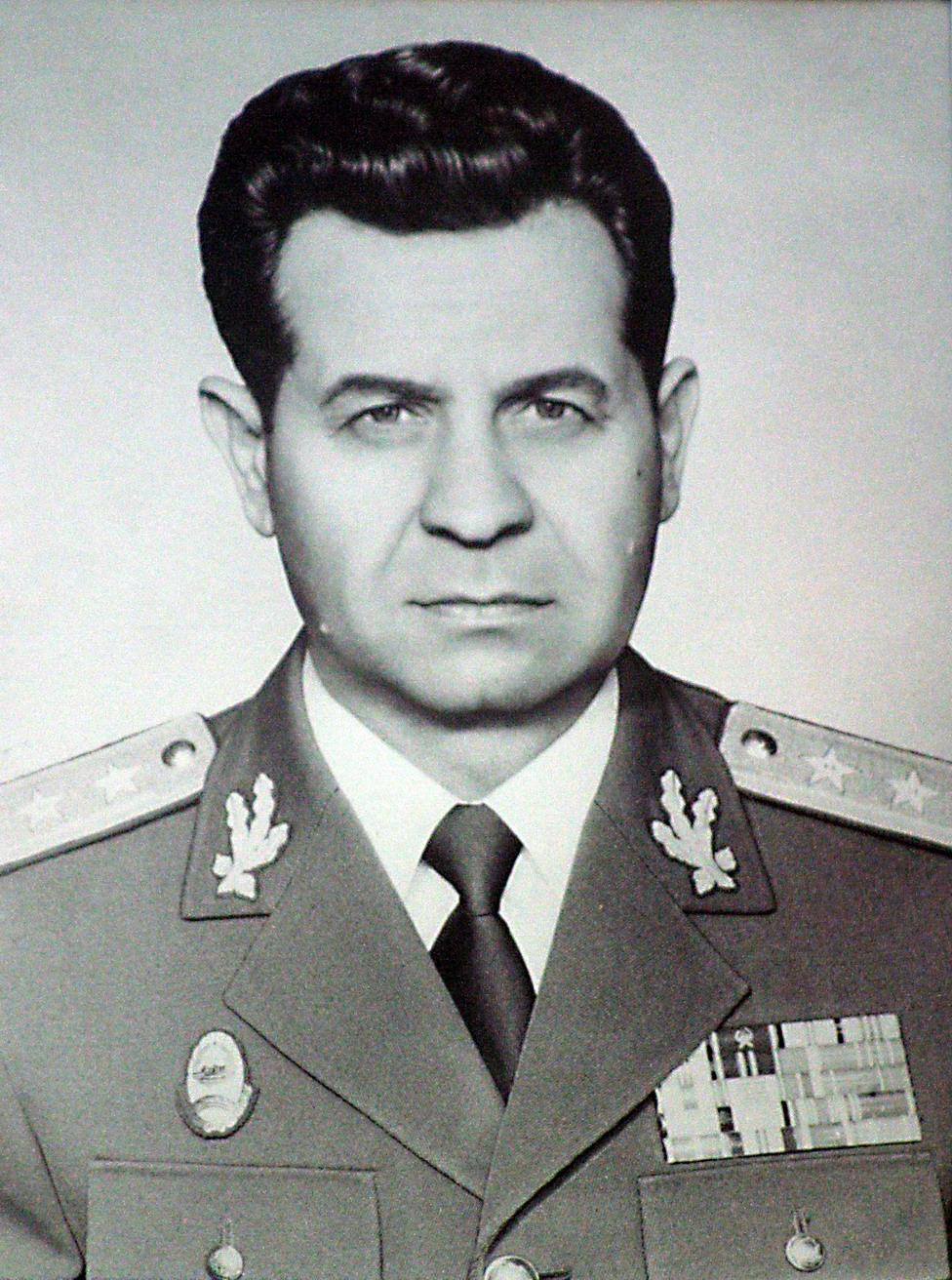

Minister of National Defense
- In office 29 March 1980 – 16 December 1985
- Preceded by: Ion Coman
- Succeeded by: Vasile Milea

Mayor of Bucharest
- In office 16 December 1985 – June 1988
- Preceded by: Gheorghe Pană
- Succeeded by: Radu Constantin

Personal details
- Born: July 5, 1928 Mătăsaru, Kingdom of Romania
- Died: May 1, 2018 (aged 89) Bucharest, Romania
- Resting place: Ghencea Cemetery
- Party: Romanian Communist Party
- Education: University of Bucharest

Military service
- Allegiance: Socialist Republic of Romania
- Rank: General
- Battles/wars: World War II

Constantin Olteanu (July 5, 1928 - May 1, 2018) was a Romanian communist politician and army general, who served as Minister of National Defense from 1980 to 1985. In December 1989, Constantin Olteanu held the position of secretary of the Central Committee of the Romanian Communist Party.

== Early life ==
Constantin Olteanu was born on July 5, 1928, in Vulcana-Pandele commune (Dâmbovița County). He graduated from the School of Active Officers in Ineu on December 30, 1949, with the rank of lieutenant.

He graduated in 1956 with a "Diploma of Merit" from the Military Academy in Bucharest, and in 1959 he obtained a degree in history after graduating from the Faculty of History of the University of Bucharest. He obtained the scientific title of doctor in historical sciences in 1964. Constantin Olteanu worked his way through the ranks of the military hierarchy, carrying out extensive teaching and instruction activities.

== Military career ==
In 1968, Nicolae Ceaușescu ordered the rehabilitation of Lucrețiu Pătrășcanu, but also of Ștefan Foriș, both victims of the power struggle during the period of Gheorghe Gheorghiu-Dej. Constantin Olteanu, a young officer and military historian, was appointed to investigate and clarify the conditions in which the mother of the Romanian Communist Party leader, Ștefan Foriș, was assassinated in Oradea.

In 1971 he had the rank of major general. In the 70s, Olteanu was in charge of purging the Romanian army of officers who were educated in the Soviet Union, regardless of whether they were recruited by the KGB or not. This operation was carried out gradually and was a "delicate process", when soldiers with important functions of command and decision, but with studies in Moscow, had to be removed from the command of the combatant units, without causing them a frond reaction, but also without to irritate Moscow. In 1979, he was appointed head of the Central Staff of the Patriotic Guards and, at the same time, military adviser to Nicolae Ceaușescu.

Between March 29, 1980, and December 16, 1985, Lieutenant General Constantin Olteanu served as Minister of National Defense. During this period he was promoted to the rank of colonel general.

== Mayor of Bucharest ==
In 1985, he was appointed as First Secretary and Mayor of Bucharest, which he held until 1988. Olteanu recalled that Nicolae Ceaușescu had just came from a visit to the Soviet Union, called him and told him: "Go on the political line, instead of Pană, and in your place we will put Milea".

Achievements during his term as mayor include the modernization of the Dâmbovița river, the continuation of works on the metro, the construction of housing and the extension of the Victoria Socialismului Boulevard to the Șoseaua Mihai Bravu.

Then, from May 1988 until December 1989, he was secretary of the Central Committee of the Romanian Communist Party, initially for propaganda and press (May 20, 1988-October 1989), then for foreign relations.

== 1989 revolution ==
On December 18, 1989, at 6:30 p.m., he arrived in Iasi. He was in the Moldova area between December 18–22, 1989. According to his own statements,

Like other party members, I was sent to deal with economic issues, namely the conclusion of the plan for that year, the supply of the population, the technical-material supply of enterprises... In the subsidiary, we were asked to discuss with the leading factors of the respective counties and the measures indicated by Ceaușescu at the teleconference on the evening of December 17, to ensure peace and public order.(...) I was not sent to Iași, as well as to the other counties - Vaslui, Suceava and Botoșani, with any authorization of a military nature, although I was still an active colonel-general, so I did not have the capacity to give orders to the Ministry of National Defence, Ministry of Internal Affairs, State Security Department or Patriotic Guards units

As he also states, in the office of the first county secretary of Iași and asked by lieutenant-colonel Ion Cioară - chief of staff at the 10th "Ștefan cel Mare" Mechanized Division in Iaşi - if it is required to arm the military with war ammunition against to the possible demonstrators, "I also specified - there were several people present - that if there will be demonstrations, somehow, the street belongs to them, to the demonstrators. "You do not intervene in anything, I said. Only if they attack the objectives, if they set them on fire, then it's something else... But on the street you have nothing to do with weapons".

On December 22, 1989, he left Iași and was received in the Second Army garrison in Buzău. General Olteanu was arrested and, on December 31, 1989, he was brought with two SUVs and an escort to the Training Center of the Genius Troops in Bucharest, on Șoseaua Olteniței, a facility transformed into a prison.

== Retirement ==
On January 11, 1990, Colonel-General Constantin Olteanu was transferred to the reserve.

He was indicted and convicted in the Trial of CPEx Members (September 17, 1990 - April 20, 1992). He was accused in the indictment of ordering some military units to go on combat alert, but he stated that he had no such assignments and that he did not enter any military unit during those days. On March 25, 1991, the Bucharest Territorial Military Court pronounced his acquittal, which was later challenged with an extraordinary appeal filed by the general prosecutor. Following this extraordinary appeal, Constantin Olteanu was definitively sentenced to 11 years and six months in prison. On May 29, 1993, he requested the suspension of the sentence. The request was examined by the Bucharest Territorial Military Court, which decided to suspend the execution of the sentence for a period of 12 months. In 1994 there was a pardon signed by the president of Romania, Ion Iliescu.

In his later years he was an associate university professor at the Faculty of History of the Spiru Haret University in Bucharest and taught the courses Military History of Romania in the 20th century and History of the Second World War from 1939 to 1945.
