= Ion Coman (general) =

Romanian lieutenant general (1926–2015)

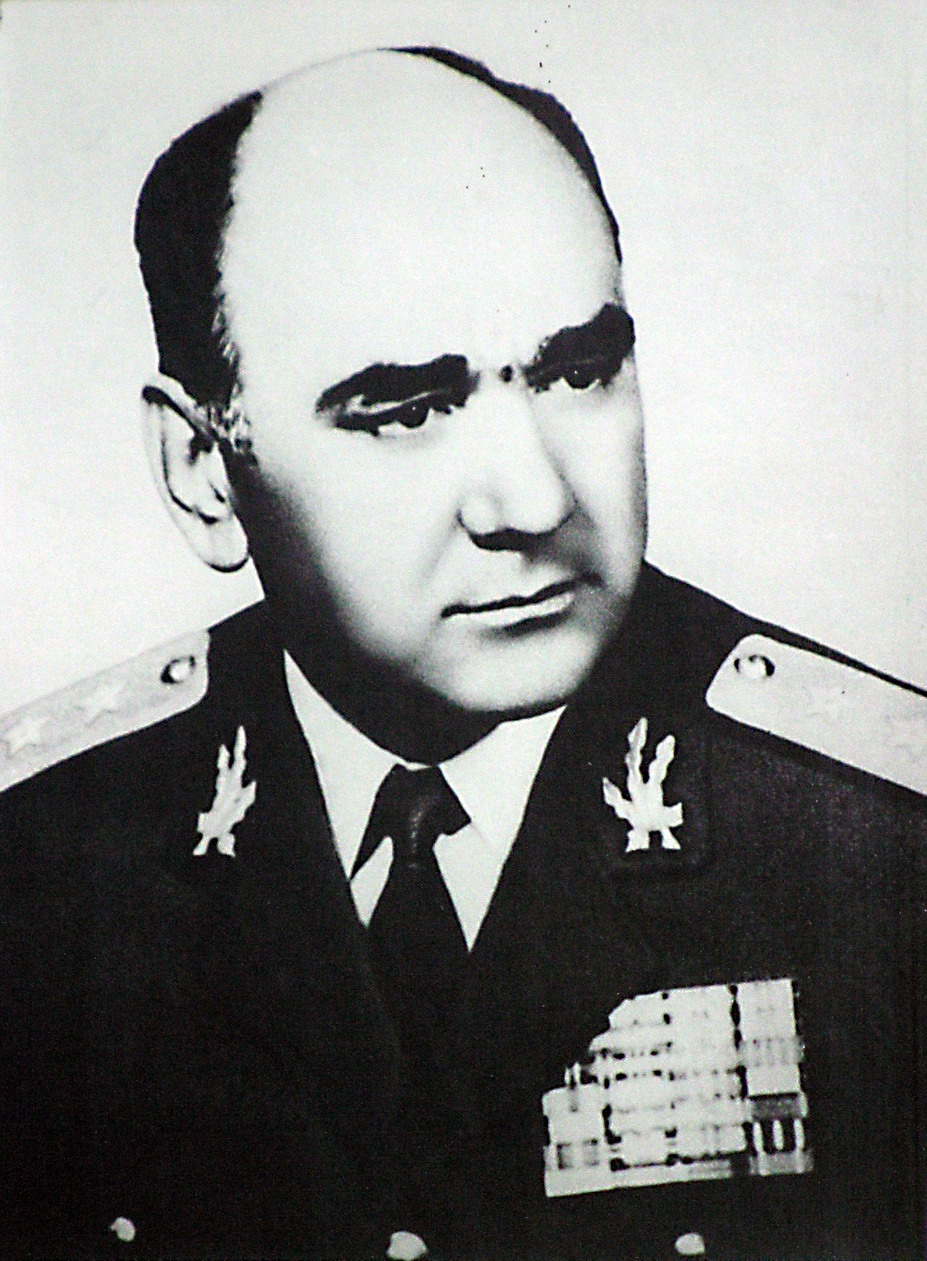

76th Minister of National Defense of Romania
- In office 16 June 1976 – 29 March 1980
- President: Nicolae Ceaușescu
- Preceded by: Ioan Ioniță
- Succeeded by: Constantin Olteanu

37th Chief of the Romanian General Staff
- In office 29 November 1974 – 16 June 1976
- President: Nicolae Ceaușescu
- Preceded by: Gheorghe Ion
- Succeeded by: Ion Hortopan

Secretary of the Central Committee
- In office 29 March 1980 – 22 December 1989
- President: Nicolae Ceaușescu

Personal details
- Born: 25 March 1926 Asan-Aga, Teleorman, Romania
- Died: 19 February 2015 (aged 88)
- Party: Romanian Communist Party
- Spouse: Married
- Children: 1

Military service
- Rank: Lieutenant general

Ion Coman (25 March 1926 – 19 February 2015) was a Romanian lieutenant general who served as Chief of the Romanian General Staff from 1974 to 1976 and Minister of National Defence from 1976 to 1980.

== Early life and career ==
Coman was born on 25 March 1926, in the commune of Asan-Aga He attended the Industrial School in Bucharest and then the Divisional School in Arad. He became an activist within the Workers' Youth Union and was sent to study at the Marxist-Leninist universities in Bucharest and Cluj, where he acquired knowledge in the field of philosophy and dialectical materialism (1954–1957).

In 1959, Coman became a student at the Faculty of Command and General Staff of the Military Academy in Bucharest, graduating as the top student. He was then assigned as an officer in the Higher Political Directorate of the Army (DSPA), alternating responsibilities within the party bodies with those in the general staff.

On 17 June 1962, he was appointed first deputy chief of the General Staff, then he served as commander of the Third Army, deployed in Cluj from 25 November 1964 to 17 June 1965, and deputy minister of the armed forces and secretary of the Supreme Political Council of the Army (1965–1974). In 1965, he became a member of the Central Committee of the Romanian Communist Party. He was promoted to the rank of colonel general (with 3 stars) on 6 May 1971.

From 29 November 1974 to 16 June 1976, Coman served as Chief of the General Staff and First Deputy Minister of National Defense. As Chief of the General Staff, he contributed to the consolidation of structures in the field of equipping the army with domestically produced equipment, and in the plan of training troops he proposed the abandonment of rigid schemes and inefficient practices. Coman was the first Chief of Staff from an Eastern European country to be received at the White House by a President of the United States when he was received by President Gerald Ford in March 1976. In 1975, Coman was re-elected as a member of the State Council of Romania. After a year and a half as Chief of the General Staff, on June 16, 1976, Coman was appointed Minister of National Defense, which he held until March 29, 1980.

Starting in 1980, he held important positions in the governing bodies of the PCR, being secretary of the Central Committee and head of the military and legal section (1980–1989) and deputy in the Grand National Assembly in the sessions from 1965 to 1989.

== Role in the Romanian Revolution ==
In December 1989, Coman served as Secretary of the Central Committee of the Communist Party of Romania (PCR). After the events in Timișoara began, Nicolae Ceaușescu convened a meeting of the PCR's Political Executive Committee, in which all the communist dignitaries present agreed that the demonstrations should be suppressed with firearms. On December 17, 1989, at 3:30 p.m., a delegation of generals from the Ministry of National Defense and the Ministry of Interior was sent to Timișoara,

On 22 December 1989, General Coman was arrested and tried for his actions, then convicted and later pardoned.

Thus, by Sentence No. 6 of 9 December 1991 of the Supreme Court of Justice, Military Section, he was sentenced to 20 years in prison and military degradation for the crime of particularly serious murder and 10 years in prison for attempted particularly serious murder.

== Release, later life and death ==
Both the Military Prosecutor's Office and the defendant appealed, and the Supreme Court of Justice, by Decision No. 30 of 6 June 1997, quashed the 1991 sentence and reduced his sentence for the crime of particularly serious murder from 20 years in prison to 15 years in prison, and for the crime of attempted particularly serious murder from 10 years in prison to 8 years in prison. According to the Criminal Code, he was to serve the maximum sentence of 15 years in prison, 10 years of deprivation of civil rights, and military degradation. .

By Decree 588/11 December 2000, signed by the President of Romania Emil Constantinescu, Coman was pardoned for the remainder of his prison sentence. In total, he served 3 years, 3 months and 10 days in detention.

Comon died on 19 February 2015, at the age of 88.

== Awards ==
- Order "23 August" 5th class (12 August 1959)
- Order "23 August" 4th class (10 August 1964)
- "Tudor Vladimirescu" Order, 3rd class (April 30, 1966)
- the title of Hero of Socialist Labor (May 7, 1981)
- Commemorative medal "40th anniversary of the social and national, anti-fascist and anti-imperialist revolution" (August 20, 1984)
- Order of the "Star of the Socialist Republic of Romania" 1st class (October 10, 1986)
