= Type 025 torpedo boat =

Torpedo boat class of the People's Liberation Army Navy

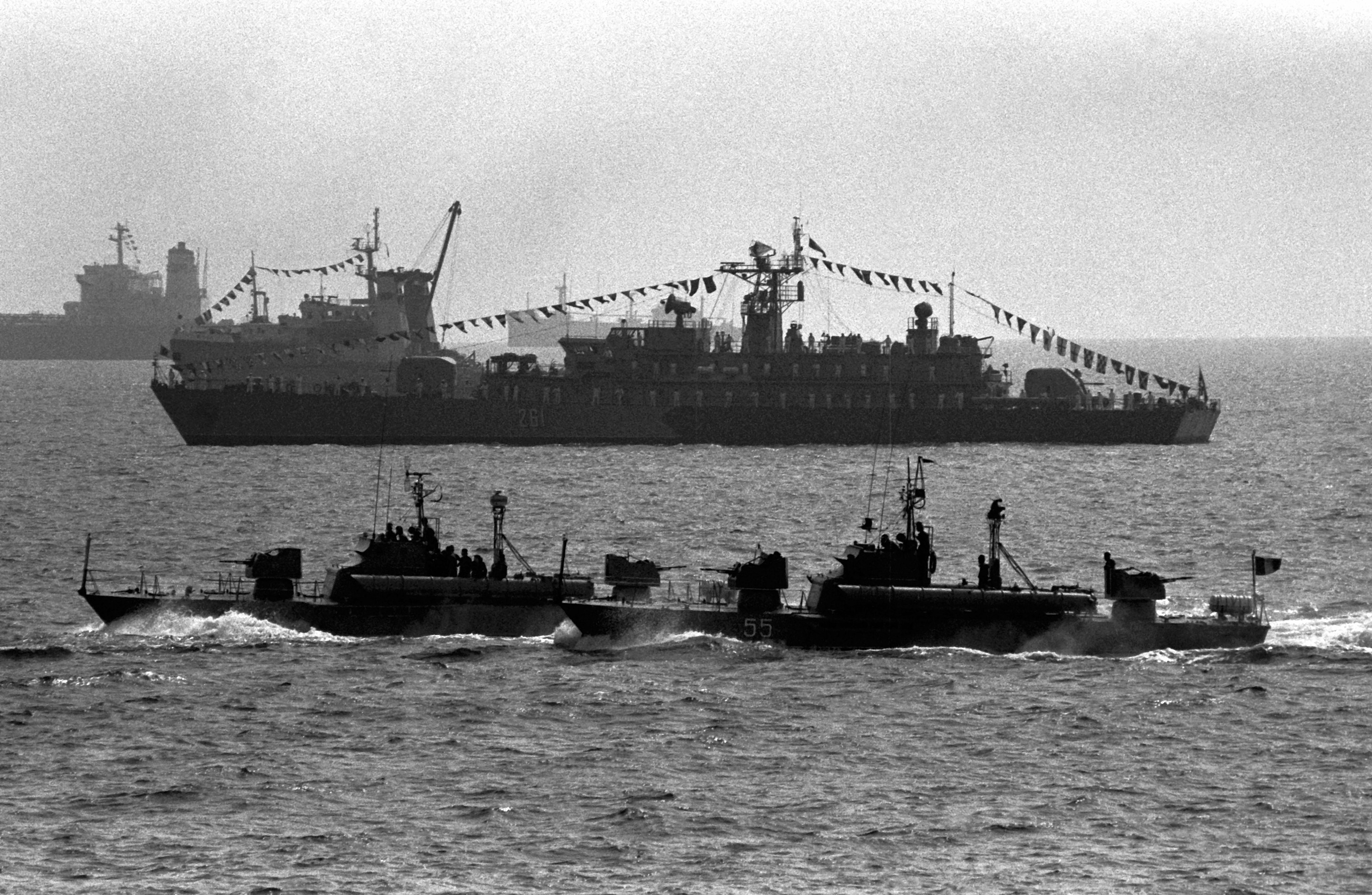
- Two Type 025 boats in Romanian service, 1992, in foreground

Class overview
- Name: Type 025 (Huchuan)
- Builders: Hudong Shipyard, Shanghai
- Operators: People's Liberation Army Navy; Romanian Naval Forces; Bangladesh Navy; Albanian Naval Force
- Preceded by: Type 02
- Succeeded by: Type 027
- In commission: 1966
- Completed: 220+

General characteristics
- Type: Fast attack hydrofoil-torpedo boats
- Displacement: 39 long tons (40 t) standard; 45 long tons (46 t) full load
- Length: 22.5 m (73.8 ft)
- Beam: 3.8 m (12.5 ft)
- Draft: 3.6 m (11.8 ft)
- Propulsion: 3 × M 50F diesel engines; 3 shafts, 3,300 hp (2,500 kW)
- Speed: 50 knots (93 km/h)
- Range: 500 mi (800 km) at 30 knots (56 km/h)
- Complement: 11 to 16
- Sensors & processing systems: Surface search/fire control; Soviet Skin Head at E-band or Chinese Type 753 navigational radar at I-band
- Armament: Standard: 2 × 533 mm (21 in) torpedo tubes and; 2 × twin 14.5 mm heavy machine guns

The Type 025 torpedo boat, also known as the Huchuan or Hu Chwan class, was once the backbone of the People's Liberation Army Navy (PLAN) in its confrontations with its much larger opponents in the Republic of China Navy. Although no longer serving in that capacity, this class is still active. While relatively unsophisticated, the class has enjoyed a longevity in active service thanks to a philosophy within PLAN which has continued to favor its use. Powered by Soviet-era engines, the hydrofoil-equipped boats are capable of 50 knots (93 km/h; 58 mph) and carry two torpedo tubes, with some known to be armed with naval mines.

== Description ==
The Type 025 torpedo boats have a standard displacement of 39 long tons (40 t) and are 45 long tons (46 t) at full load. They are 21.8 metres (71.5 ft) long with a beam 6.3 metres (20.7 ft) and a hullborne draft of 3.6 metres (11.8 ft). The torpedo boats are powered by three Type M 50F diesel engines rated at 3,300 horsepower (2,461 kW) driving three shafts. Equipped with hydrofoils, they are located forward while the stern planes are located on the surface. The maximum speed while on foils is 50 knots (93 km/h; 58 mph) and the vessels have a range of 500 nautical miles (930 km; 580 mi) at 30 knots (56 km/h; 35 mph). The torpedo boats are equipped with Soviet-made "Skin Head" radar operating on E band. The vessels are armed with two 533-millimetre (21 in) torpedo tubes and two twin 14.5-millimetre (0.57 in) heavy machine guns. In Romanian service, the Type 025 vessels had two rails for depth charges added and Chinese Type 753 radar operating on the I band.

=== Type 026 torpedo boat ===
The Type 026, a variant of the Type 025, are 46 long tons (47 t) at full load, 22.5 metres (73.8 ft) long with a beam of 5.0 metres (16.4 ft) and a draft of 2.1 metres (6.9 ft). They have three Type L-12V-180 diesel engines rated at 3,600 horsepower driving three shafts. They also have hydrofoils and have similar speed and range to the Type 025. The Type 026 is also armed with two twin 14.5 mm machine guns and two 533 mm torpedo tubes. However, they have Chinese Type 753 surface search radar operating on the I band.

== Operational doctrine ==
In an era of increasingly effective countermeasures against anti-ship missiles, the countermeasures against torpedoes are relatively few and less effective in comparison, so although ineffective in open waters, torpedo boats can still play a role in coastal defense given sufficient protection. Their stealthiness and high speed are useful for surprise attacks on an enemy from coastal hideouts, such as caves, if the boats are integrated into an overall system that includes a supporting C4ISR structure, as well as shore defenses, aircraft, and larger ships. As a result of this philosophy, the production of Type 025 torpedo boats lasted well into the 1990s, despite the fact that the retirement of early units of this class had already begun in the mid 1980s.

== Variants ==
The Type 025 was originally designed to solve the problems presented by existing Soviet torpedo boats in the Chinese inventory. The P 4-class torpedo boat (Type K-123) was lightly armed, and thus did not have sufficient self-defense firepower in a retreat after having launched its torpedoes. The P 6-class torpedo boat (Type K-183) had enough guns for self-defense, but its wooden hull was vulnerable to fire if hit. The Type 025 was subsequently developed to incorporate the advantages of both classes by adopting the metallic hull of the P 4 class and the heavier self-defense armament of the P 6 class. Several versions of the class exist, which differ mainly in their secondary armament. For example, some had extra guns in addition to the standard 14.5 mm heavy machine guns, while others had the capability to carry and lay two additional mines. Due to the different the weapons carried, the complement of each boat varies from 11 to 16. Structurally, some of the hulls have an additional pair of small hydrofoils near the bow, while others do not have hydrofoils at all. Guns are usually mounted aft, but some examples of the type possess one forward mounting and one aft. Although small batch orders continued into the 1990s, production had completely stopped by the early 2000s. At least half a dozen variants of Huchuan class have been confirmed in service with PLAN:

- Type 6625: The original aluminum-hulled version without hydrofoils, built by No. 425 Factory, subsequently transferred to Hudong Shipyard for series production and modification.
- Type 025: Aluminum-hulled version built by Hudong Shipyard, some units in later production batches had hydrofoil added.
- Type 026: Steel-hulled version without hydrofoil, built by Qiu-Xin (求新) shipyard.
- Type 026II: Type 026 with hydrofoil.
- Type 026H: Patrol boat version used by PLAN patrol squadron in Hong Kong.
- R704: Export version with a different hull shape (small-V hull), with one unit retained by PLAN as a trial boat to test torpedo weapon control system.

== Operators ==
Albania

- Albanian Naval Force – 32 boats acquired in 1968-1974, all decommissioned.

Bangladesh

- Bangladesh Navy – 4 boats acquired in 1988, all decommissioned.

China

- People's Liberation Army Navy

Democratic Republic of the Congo

- Navy of the Democratic Republic of the Congo – 4 acquired in 1976-1978, all decommissioned.

Pakistan

- Pakistan Navy – 4 acquired in 1973, all decommissioned and transferred to Bangladesh.

Romania

- Romanian Naval Forces – 3 acquired in 1973, 30 produced in 1974-1990 at Mangalia, all decommissioned.

Tanzania

- Tanzania Naval Command – 4 acquired in 1975.
