= Ion Tutoveanu =

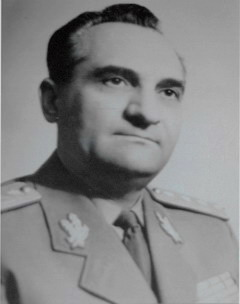
Official portrait.

General of the Army Ion Tutoveanu (December 26, 1914 – July 26, 2014) was a general in the Army of the Socialist Republic of Romania, the longest-serving Chief of the Romanian General Staff of the military force, with a term of 11 years and 50 days. He is also the only general to have fought in the Second World War in the Eastern Front, the Western Front, and to have led the General Staff after 1945.

Between 1965 and 1981, Tutoveanu served as the commander of the Military Academy in Bucharest. In 1981, he retired at the age of 67. He died on July 26, 2014, at the age of 99. He was a recipient of the Order of Labour, the August 23 Order and the title of Hero of Socialist Labour.
