= Canon de 105 L mle 1936 Schneider =

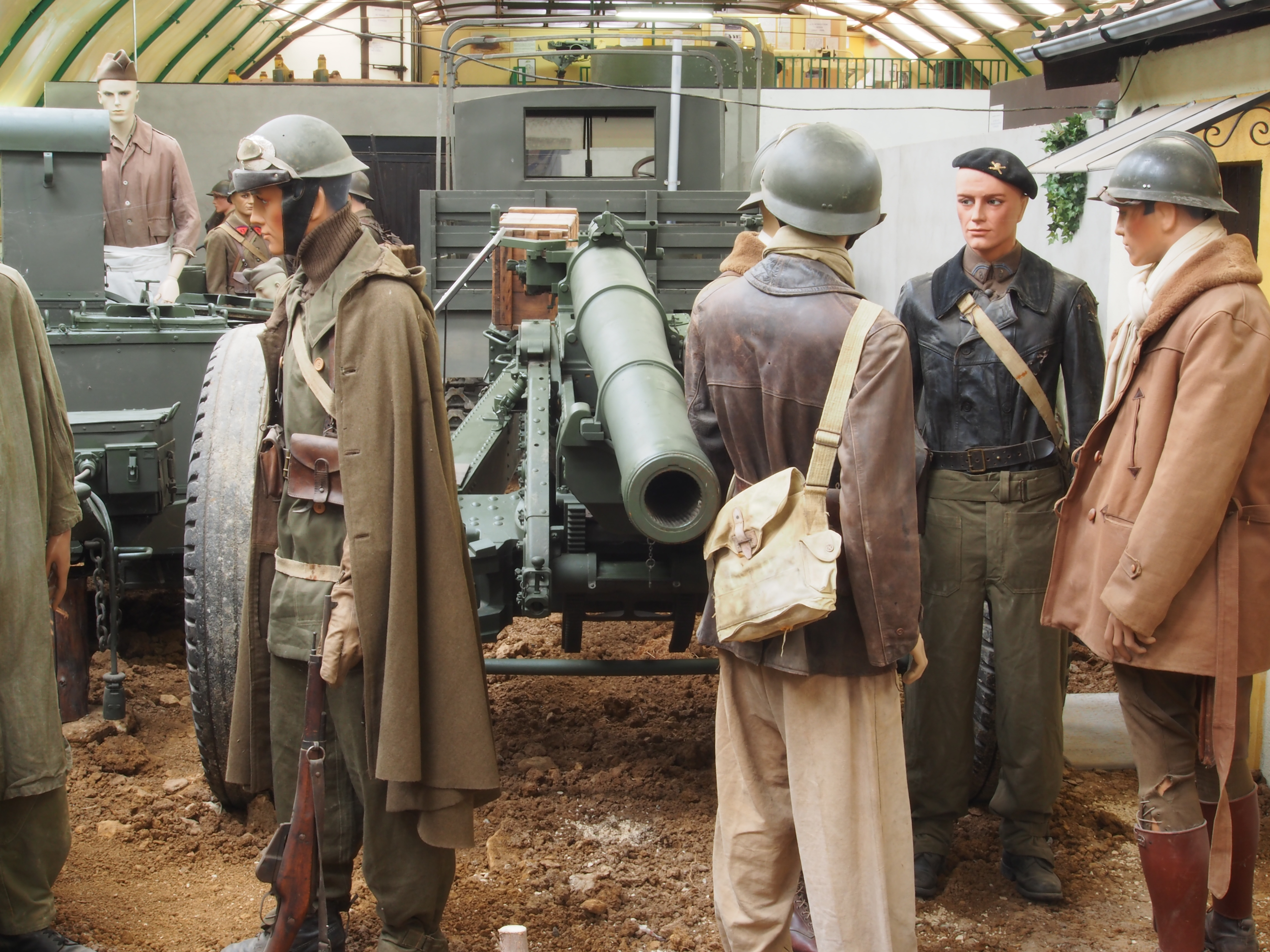
- Type: heavy field gun
- Place of origin: France

Service history
- In service: 1936–1990s
- Used by: France; Nazi Germany; Romania; North Vietnam
- Wars: World War II; First Indochina War; Algerian War

Production history
- Designer: Schneider
- Manufacturer: Schneider
- Variants: Horse- or truck-drawn

Specifications
- Mass: 3,920 kg (7,253 lbs) tractor 3,540 kg (7,804 lbs) horse-drawn
- Barrel length: 3.905 m (12 ft 10 in) L/37.6
- Shell: separate-loading, cased charge and projectile 15.7 kg (35 lb)
- Caliber: 105 mm (4.13 in)
- Carriage: Box trail
- Elevation: 0° to +47° 48'
- Traverse: 50°
- Rate of fire: 4 rpm
- Muzzle velocity: 725 m/s (2,379 ft/s)
- Effective firing range: 16,000 m (17,498 yds)

The Canon de 105 L modèle 1936 Schneider was a field gun used by France in World War II.

== Description ==
It was built in two versions, one with steel wheels and pneumatic tires for tractor towing and the other with wooden spoked wheels for horse towing. Its range was still inferior to its German equivalents.

== Users ==
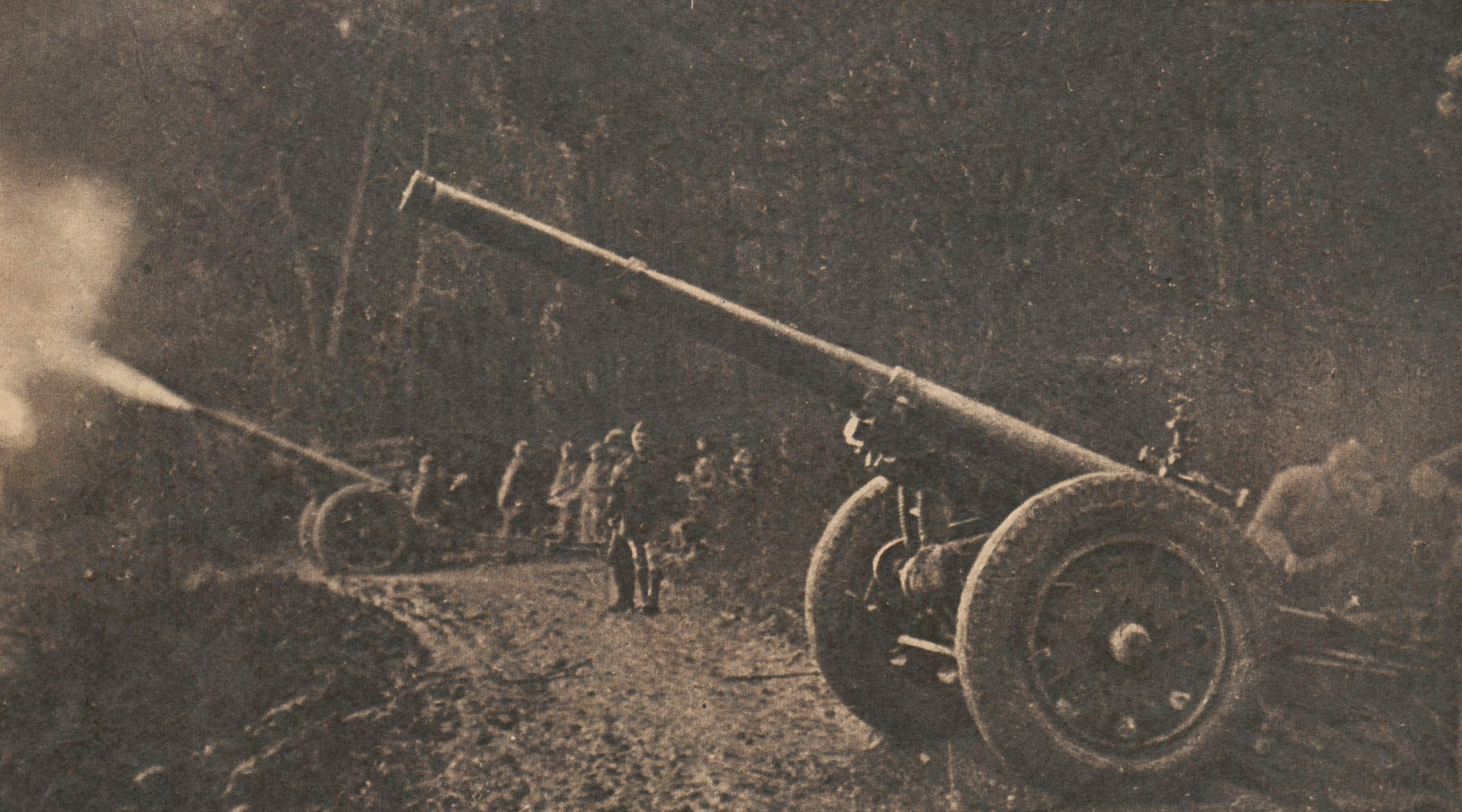
French 105L 36 guns in action in December 1939.

In France, 159 were in service in 1939. They were used in organic Corps artillery regiments. Captured examples in World War II were placed into German service as the 10.5 cm schwere Kanone 332(f) where they mainly served on coast defense duties. The French army used 105 L Schneider during Indochina and Algerian Wars.

The Romanian Army ordered 180 pieces, but received only 132 before World War II broke out. It was the longest-ranged gun used by Romania in the war. During the 1980s, the surviving guns were upgraded with modern wheels and used for training until the ammunition stocks ran out in the mid 1990s, when the gun was finally retired from service. Low-level delivery continued after the start of World War II. Twelve more guns were supplied until the fall of France in 1940. Thus, Romania received a total of 144 pieces out of the 180 that were ordered.
