= Ion Ioniță (general) =

Romanian army general and politician

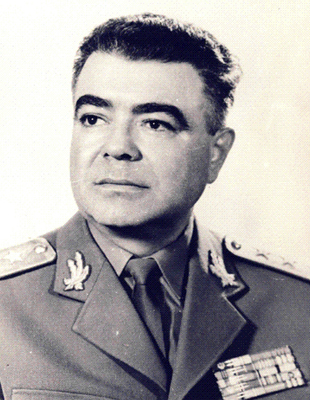

Minister of the Armed Forces
- In office 29 August 1966 – 16 June 1976
- Prime Minister: Ion Gheorghe Maurer; Manea Mănescu
- Preceded by: Leontin Sălăjan
- Succeeded by: Ion Coman

Personal details
- Born: June 14, 1924 Mătăsaru commune, Kingdom of Romania
- Died: July 27, 1987 (aged 63) Bucharest, Socialist Republic of Romania
- Resting place: Ghencea Cemetery
- Party: Romanian Communist Party

Military service
- Allegiance: Socialist Republic of Romania
- Rank: General
- Battles/wars: World War II

Ion Ioniță (June 14, 1924, Mătăsaru commune, Dâmbovița County - July 27, 1987, Bucharest) was a Romanian army general and politician who served as Minister of the Armed Forces from 1966 to 1976 and as deputy prime minister from 1976 to 1982.

== Biography ==
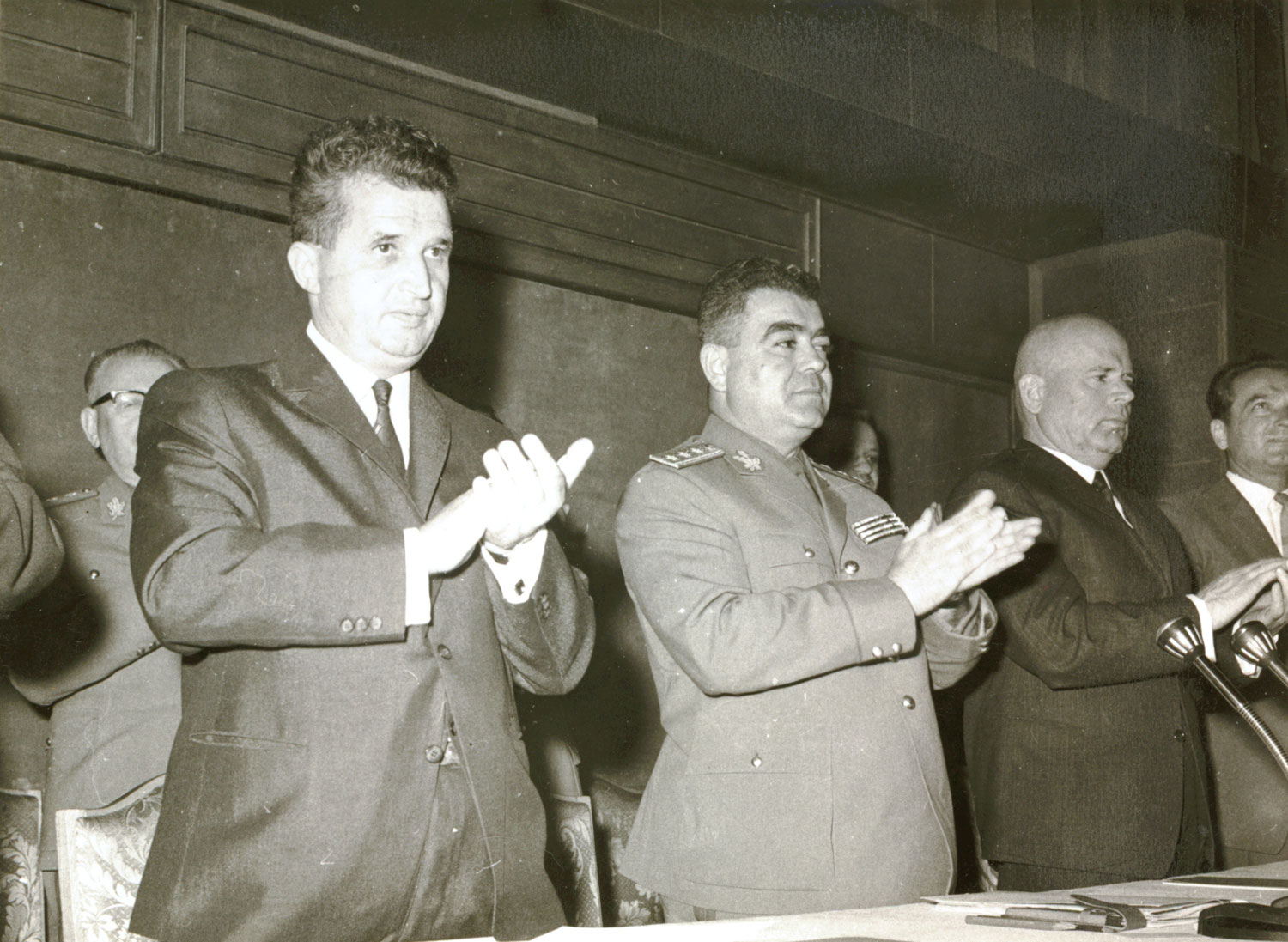
Ioan Ioniță together with Nicolae Ceaușescu and Chivu Stoica at the meeting with army soldiers (May 30–31, 1967).

Ion Ioniță was born on June 14, 1924, in Matăsaru commune in Dâmbovița County, in a family of poor peasants. He worked as a mechanic at Căile Ferate Române Workshops - Bucharest Triage. In September 1944 he received the authorization to contact the young workers from Grivița, from Transport-Călători and Tipografia Filaret, for the organization of the working youth and the creation of a UTC sector comprising the CFR units in Bucharest. He was elected as responsible for youth issues within the CFR Bucharest Union. In a short time, he is elected as a member of the Central Committee of the Union of CFR Trade Unions in the country (whose president was Chivu Stoica) and a member of the Management Bureau of this body.

At the beginning of 1945, on the recommendation of Marta Cziko (the future wife of Alexandru Drăghici, Minister of the Interior), Ion Ioniță became a member of the Romanian Communist Party and on this occasion also a member of the Romanian Communist Party Sector Committee of the CFR and its Bureau, as responsible for the youth. He attended the Party Evening University (for 6 months in 1945) and then the Constanța Party School (March - June 1947).

In October 1948, he entered the army with the rank of lieutenant, becoming a youth instructor in the Higher Political Directorate of the Army (October 1948 - May 1950) and then head of the Propaganda Section in the Command of Tank, Armored and Mechanized Troops (May 1950 - April 1951). During this period he quickly advanced in the military hierarchy, being promoted to the ranks of lieutenant major (December 1949), captain (August 1950) and major (April 1951).

Ioniță continued his military training, graduating from a course for commanders and chiefs of staff at the Military Academy (January - June 1953) and the Military Academy of the Soviet General Staff (November 1956 - December 1958).

He was elected as an alternate (candidate) member (December 1955 - July 1965) and then a full (voting) member of the Central Committee of the Romanian Communist Party (1965-1984). He was also a deputy in the Great National Assembly in the sessions from 1961 to 1985.

In May 1971 he was awarded Army general rank. After serving as deputy minister of national defense between December 1962 and August 1966, General Ioniță became Minister of the Armed Forces from August 29, 1966 to June 16, 1976 and then deputy prime minister from June 16, 1976 to May 20, 1982. In June 1982, he was transferred to the reserve.

Ioniță was decorated with several orders and medals, including the Medal "The 40th anniversary of the founding of the Communist Party of Romania" (May 1961).

=== Retirement, Plot and Death ===
Ioniță's name, who was considered close associate of Ceausescu was circulated in 1984 on the occasion of a plot that tried to remove Nicolae Ceaușescu, when he was on a visit to West Germany. Ion Ioniță and Nicolae Militaru elaborated the plan of a coup d'état. The conspirators hoped to benefit from the support of the Bucharest Military Garrison for the arrest of the closest collaborators of the president (Emil Bobu, Ion Dincă, Tudor Postelnicu, Ion Coman and Ilie Ceaușescu), then to take control of the radio and television stations to announce the change that had taken place. The plan failed, he being exposed by two of the generals who were going to participate in this action.

In 1987, Ioniță experienced rampant cancer and died in three months, in July 1987.

Ioniță died on July 27, 1987, in the city of Bucharest, being ill with cancer. He was not given a national funeral, although the Military Regulations provided for such ceremonies for soldiers with the rank of army general.
