= Constantin Gh. Popescu =

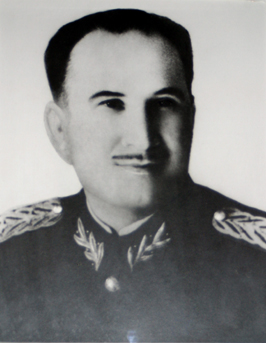
Official portrait.

Constantin Gh. Popescu (born September 8, 1893 – 1985) was a general in the Army of the Socialist Republic of Romania, serving as the first Chief of the Romanian General Staff of the military force.

== Early life and career ==
He was born on September 8, 1893, in Cornești, Bujoreanca, Dâmbovița County. His military career began the day after his 19th birthday, on September 9, 1912, when he took the entrance exam to the Military School of Artillery and Engineering in Bucharest, upon graduation of which he was promoted on July 1, 1914, to the rank of second lieutenant and received the position of platoon commander in the 9th Howitzer Regiment of the Romanian Army.

=== World War I ===
During the First World War, Popescu served in Moldavia during the Romanian Campaign. On November 1, 1916, he was promoted to the rank of lieutenant. On August 6, 1917, Popescu, when in command of his battery deployed near Mărășești, he remained in position and carried out his combat taks, for which he was promoted to the rank of captain on September 1, 1917. In March 1918, he left for France, being immediately assigned to the 101st Heavy Artillery Regiment, with which he would participate until the end of the war.

=== Interwar years ===
On June 29, 1919, he returned to the country, being reintegrated among the active cadres of the Romanian Army, after the file for which he had been accused of desertion was closed. He completed his military studies by attending the courses of the Higher School of War (now Carol I National Defence University) from 1920 to 1922, upon graduation of which he was assigned to the General Staff of the 5th Army Corps. On July 1, 1924, he was transferred to the 38th Howitzer Regiment Timișoara, where he was promoted to the rank of major on May 10, 1925, and, at the same time, was promoted to professor of artillery tactics at the Military School of Artillery Officers in Timișoara (1925–1932). His military career took off on July 1, 1932, when he was appointed Deputy Chief of Staff at the General Inspectorate of the Gendarmerie, and in 1934 he was promoted to the rank of lieutenant colonel and transferred to the 1st Anti-Aircraft Defense Regiment. Also in 1934, he successively held various positions, being appointed head of the Production Control service at the Army Arsenal, commander of the 2nd Division of the 29th Artillery Regiment, and head of the training office of the same regiment.

=== World War II ===
On November 1, 1937, Popescu received the command of the 32nd Artillery Regiment in Satu Mare and was promoted to the rank of colonel on February 27, 1939. Between 1936 and 1940, he was editor of the literary, social-cultural magazine "Afirmarea", which appeared in Satu Mare. With the reorganization of the army, on December 16, 1940, he was appointed commander of the 24th Artillery Regiment with the garrison in the city of Roman, in which capacity he actively participated in operations in Bessarabia and Northern Bukovina.

On March 15, 1942, Popescu was appointed commander of the artillery of the 1st Guards Division in Bucharest, and on September 1, 1942, he received the position of deputy within the Operational Command of the 1st Guards Division in Constanța. In the spring of 1944, he was transferred to command the artillery of the 5th Army Corps on the Eastern Front, and on March 23, 1944, he was promoted to the rank of brigadier general.

=== Post-war ===
After King Michael's Coup, he was appointed commander of the Bucharest Square Command, and after the fall of the Rădescu cabinet and the installation on March 6, 1945, of First Groza cabinet in its place, Popescu was appointed Director General of the Police, thus becoming subordinate to the Minister of the Interior Teohari Georgescu. On August 23, 1946, he was promoted to the rank of Division General, and in November 1946, he was appointed Secretary General of the Ministry of the Interior. After three years spent within the Ministry of the Interior, Popescu from Dâmbovița was recalled to the Ministry of National Defense and appointed Chief of the General Staff of the Romanian Army.

== Later life ==
On March 18, 1950, Popescu, a Colonel-General at the time, was placed in reserve, and until January 18, 1952, he held the position of deputy minister at the Ministry of Construction. It was during this time which he also held the office of deputy for Argeș in the Great National Assembly (1948–1952), being a prominent member of the Ploughmen's Front and representing the People's Democratic Front. He died in 1985 aged 91.

== Awards ==
- Officer of the Order of the Star of Romania in the rank of officer (June 8, 1940)
- Order of the Crown of Romania (May 27, 1942)
- Oak Leaf to the Military Virtue Ribbon of the Order of the Crown of Romania (May 12, 1945)
- Order of 23 August, 3rd class (12 August 1959)
- Order of 23 August, 2nd class (10 August 1964)
- Order of Saint Anna, 3rd class
- Croix de Guerre
- War Merit Cross
