= Vasile Milea =

Romanian general and politician (1927–1989)

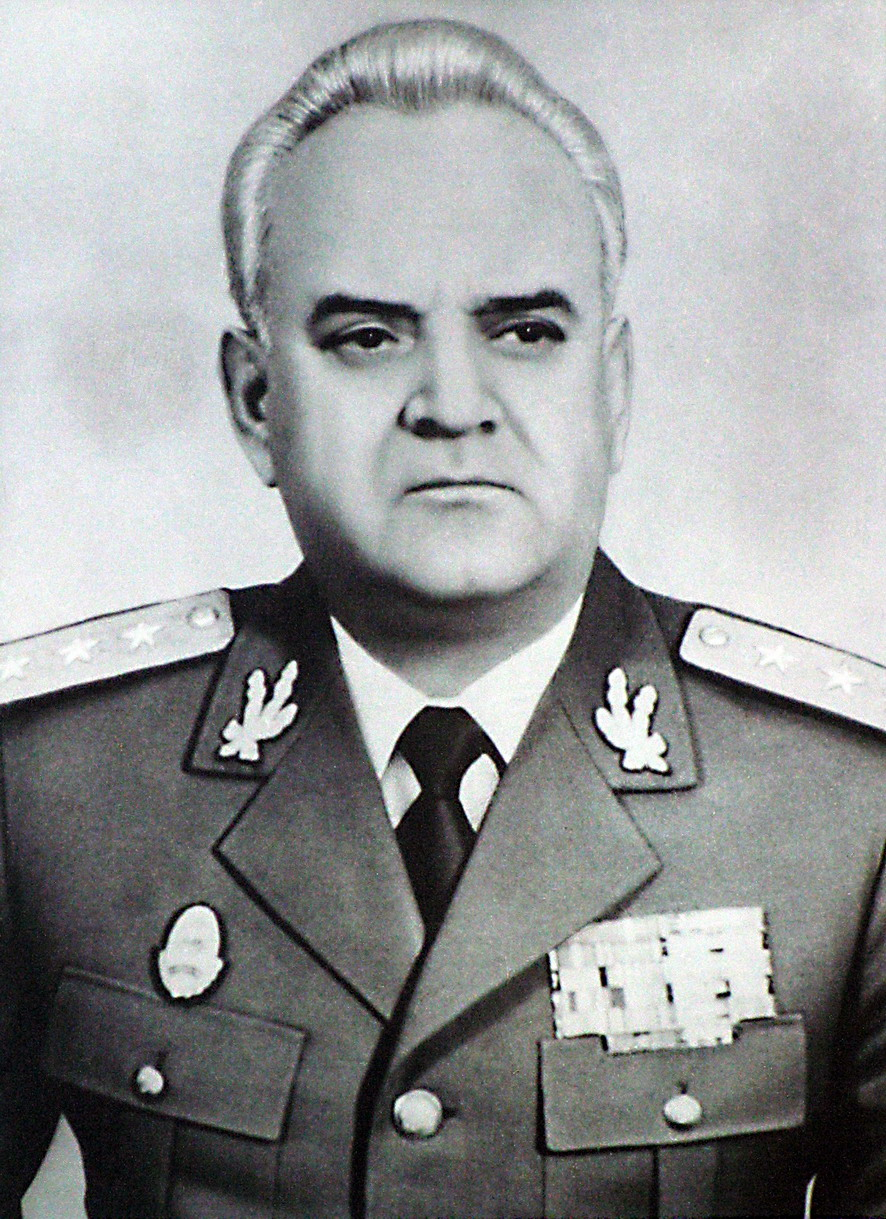

75th Minister of National Defense of Romania
- In office 16 December 1985 – 22 December 1989
- President: Nicolae Ceaușescu
- Prime Minister: Constantin Dăscălescu
- Preceded by: Constantin Olteanu
- Succeeded by: Victor Stănculescu (acting)

89th Chief of the Romanian General Staff
- In office 31 March 1980 – 16 February 1985
- President: Nicolae Ceaușescu
- Preceded by: Ion Hortopan
- Succeeded by: Ștefan Gușă

Personal details
- Born: 1 January 1927 Lerești, Argeș County, Kingdom of Romania
- Died: 22 December 1989 (aged 62) Bucharest, Socialist Republic of Romania
- Profession: Military Officer

Military service
- Branch/service: Army of the Socialist Republic of Romania
- Years of service: 1947–1989
- Rank: Colonel general

Vasile Milea (1 January 1927 – 22 December 1989) was a Romanian politician and general who served as the 75th Minister of National Defense of Romania from 1985 until his suicide in 1989. Milea was Nicolae Ceaușescu's Minister of Defense during the Romanian revolution of 1989 and was involved in the reprisal phase of the revolution that caused the deaths of 162 people.

== Early life ==
Vasile Milea was born in the commune of Lerești, Argeș County, Kingdom of Romania, on January 1, 1927. He graduated from high school and worked as a teacher. In 1947, he entered the infantry military school, graduating in May 1949 and receiving the rank of lieutenant. On September 20, 1957, he was accepted into the Romanian Workers' Party. After a large shortfall at Milea's place of service (approximately 700,000 Romanian leu) was discovered, he was dismissed from service, and on July 30, 1958, he was expelled from the party.

For several years, Milea worked in various military education departments. On October 6, 1960, following his application, he was reinstated in the party. On December 30, 1962, he was awarded the rank of colonel. In 1964, he was promoted to major general and appointed commander of the 6th Tank Division (1964-1965), then the 3rd Army (1965-1973). He commanded the Patriotic Guard from 1973 to 1978. On August 23, 1969, he was awarded the rank of lieutenant general, and in May 1977, colonel general. Since 1974, he was a candidate member of the Central Committee of the RCP, and since 1979, a member of the Central Committee of the RCP.

== Minister of Defence ==
Milea was appointed Minister of Defence, replacing Constantine Olteanu, in December 1985. Milea was in severe disfavour for sending troops to quell the uprising in Timișoara without ammunition and for his refusal to order the army to shoot the protestors who had gathered around the Central Committee building.

=== Death ===
Milea committed suicide on 22 December 1989. His death is believed to have happened at about 10:40 a.m. and was announced on television, where he was described as a traitor, which may have been interpreted by other generals as a sign of growing distrust, leading to their loyalty wavering. Regardless, Milea's suicide caused the rank-and-file soldiers to go over en masse to the revolution, effectively ending the Communist rule in Romania. He was succeeded as Minister of Defence by Victor Stănculescu, who also disobeyed orders and returned the army to the barracks.

A report in 1989 indicated that he had been shot by Ceaușescu's Securitate, although this was contradicted by a report from 2005 after a full investigation including a post-mortem concluded that Milea killed himself using the weapon of one of his attendants. It was suggested that he only tried to incapacitate himself in order to be relieved from office, but the bullet hit an artery and he died soon afterwards.

== Legacy ==
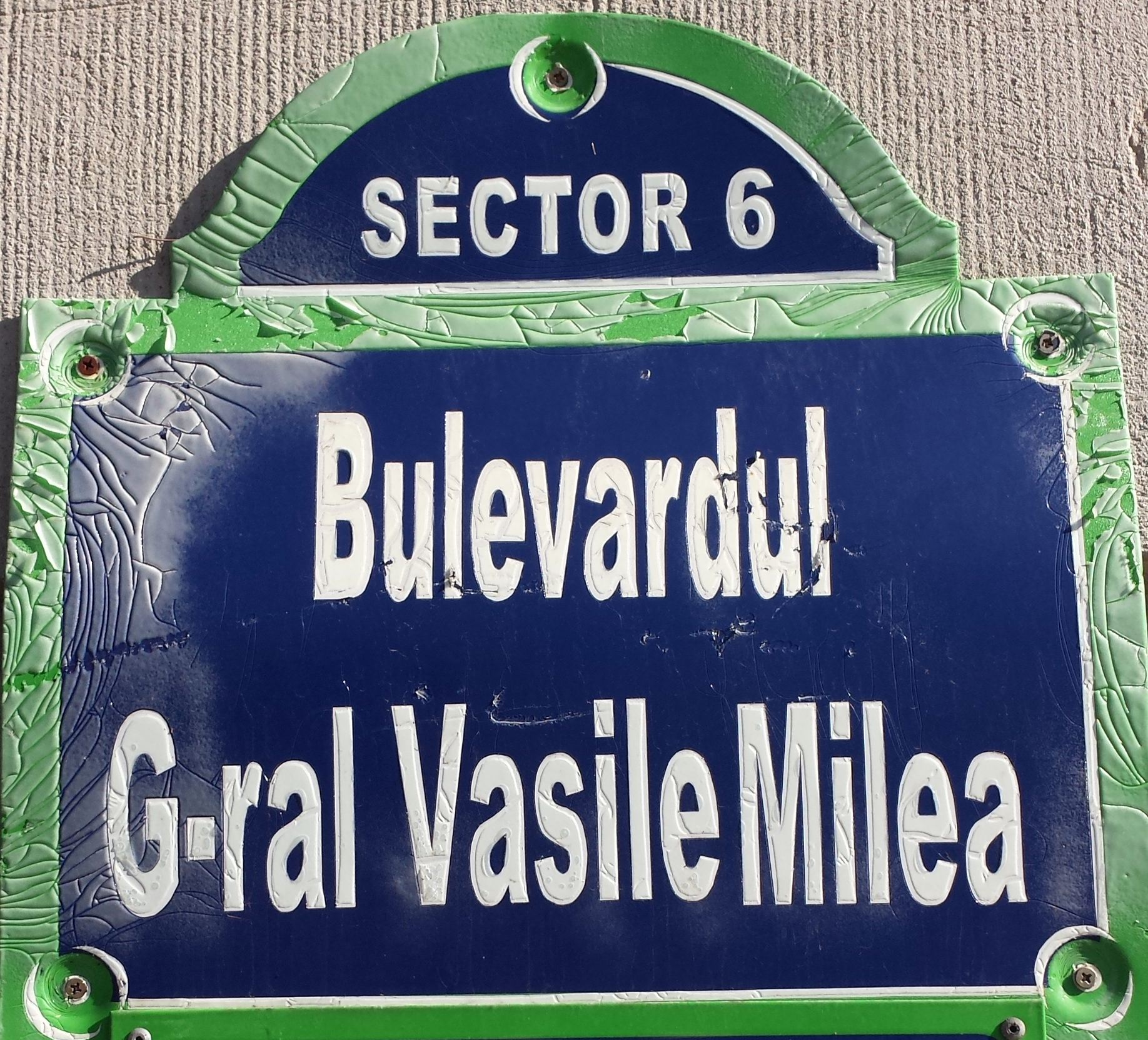
Boulevard General Vasile Milea, Bucharest, Sector 6

A boulevard in Sector 6 of Bucharest used to be named after him until 2021. A street in Ploiești is still named after him, as well as a central square in Pitești.

== Awards ==
- Order "23 August" III degree (1971)
- Order of the Star of Romania
- Order of Labor
- Order of the October Revolution (December 31, 1986)

== Works ==
- Vasile Milea, Victor Atanasiu, România în anii primului război mondial: caracterul drept, eliberator al participării României la război, vol. 2, Ed. Militară, Bucharest, 1987. OCLC 18616519
