= MLVM =

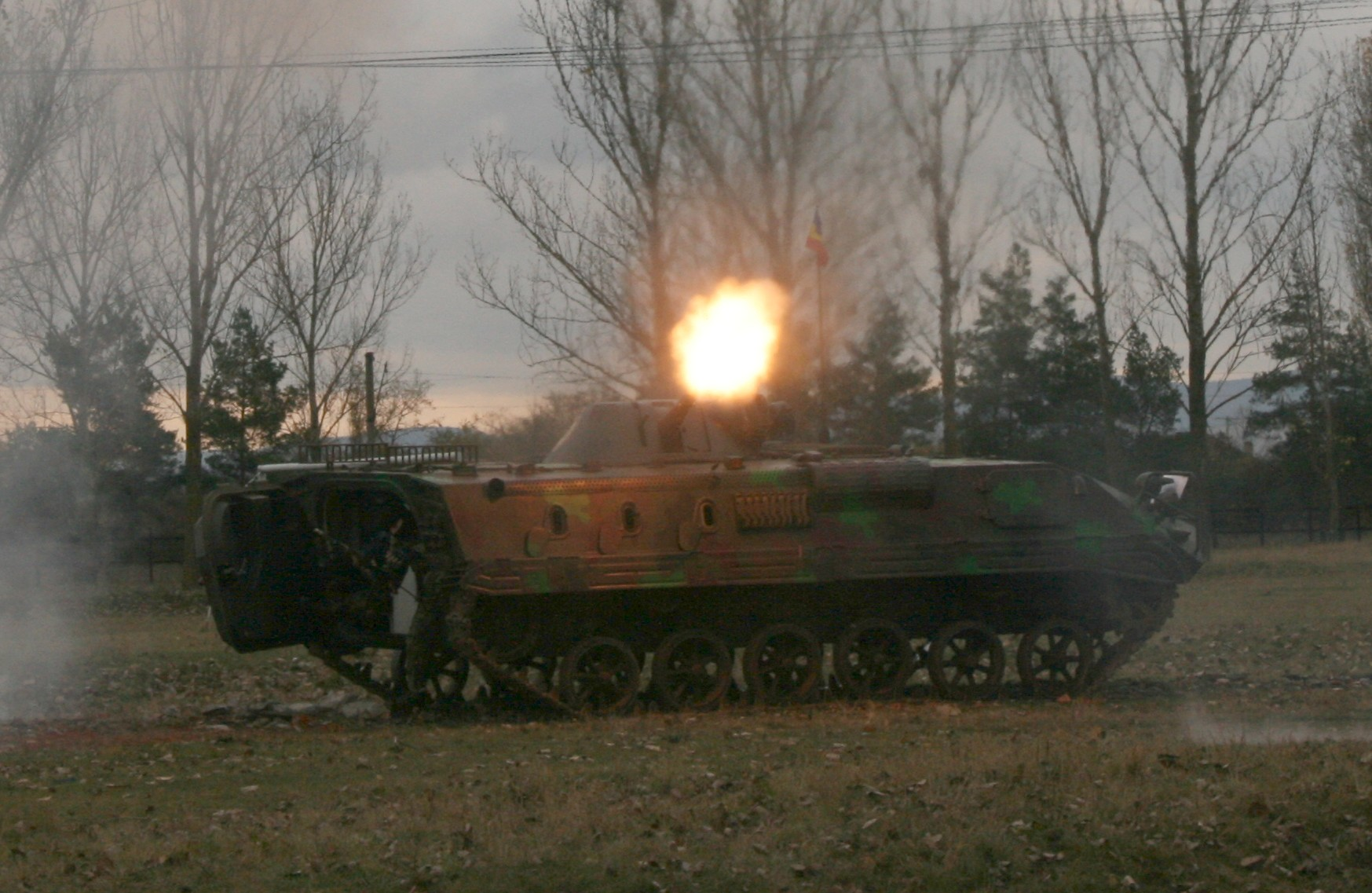
- MLVM firing during a demonstration
- Type: Armoured personnel carrier
- Place of origin: Romania

Service history
- In service: late 1980s - present
- Used by: Romanian Land Forces

Production history
- Manufacturer: Uzina Mecanică Mizil (first 40 vehicles); Uzina Tractorul Brașov (the rest of the vehicles)

Specifications
- Mass: 9 tonnes
- Length: 5.85 m (19 ft 2 in)
- Width: 2.71 m (8 ft 11 in)
- Height: 1.95 m (6 ft 5 in)
- Crew: 2 (driver and gunner)
- Passengers: 7
- Armor: protection against 7,62 mm rounds
- Main armament: 1 × 14.5 mm KPVT machinegun 600 rounds
- Secondary armament: 1 × 7.62 mm PKT machinegun 2500 rounds
- Engine: Saviem 798-05M2, supercharged diesel, 4-stroke, 154 hp
- Transmission: manual
- Suspension: Torsion bar
- Fuel capacity: 480 litres (internal: 360 L and doors: 120 L)
- Operational range: 700 km (430 mi)
- Maximum speed: 48 km/h (30 mph); 15 km/h (9.3 mph) in water

MLVM (Romanian: Mașina de Luptă a Vânătorilor de Munte, lit. 'infantry fighting vehicle of the Mountain Huntsmen') is a Romanian armoured personnel carrier. The vehicle was designed and used as an infantry fighting vehicle for the vânători de munte (mountain units) of the Romanian Land Forces, though technically it is a tracked armoured personnel carrier according to UN classification because of its light armor and armament.

== Description ==
The vehicle was designed and used as an infantry fighting vehicle for the vânători de munte (mountain units). The hull is inspired from SU-76 tank destroyer but is substantially modified for rough terrain. The turret is the same as that installed on the Romanian TAB-71M (8 × 8) APC. This turret is recognisable by the large day sight mounted on the left side, which is provided with a protective cage. The vehicle has been designed specifically to be used in mountainous areas.

Armament consists of a 14.5 mm caliber KPVT heavy machine gun, and a co-axial 7.62 mm PKT machine gun.

The hull is made of welded steel plates and ensures protection against bullet caliber 7.62 mm and artillery splinters. The suspension is torsion bar. Road wheels (six from each drive sprocket) have holes to reduce weight. MLVM is fully amphibious, being propelled with a maximum speed of 5–6 km/h in water. Prior to the crossing of rivers or lakes (although the MLVM is amphibious, it is not designed for marine infantry use), a trim vane must be erected at the front and bilge pumps turned on, taking no more than 5 minutes. Suspension is torsion bar type with six rubber-tyred spoked road wheels either side, drive sprocket at the front, idler at the rear and track-return rollers. Some vehicles have been observed with five - not six - road wheels.

Regarding internal arrangement, in front, on the left, stands the driver's hatch. It has at its disposal three periscopes for observation during day time and central one can be replaced by a night vision block during night-time. Behind the driver's hatch is located the commander. Both can use the hatch from the ceiling, in the front left side. Commander has at its disposal an IR night vision system and has a hatch with two wide-angle vision blocks to his sides and a periscope/vision block which can be raised and rotated to allow the commander to view the area around the vehicle from under armor. The troop room is at the rear, have two roof hatches, six firing ports (three in each side) each with an associated day periscope and a door in the rear which has two firing ports and two day periscopes as well as containing some diesel fuel and which is used as fuel reservoir. The troops are seated three each side, with the seventh manning the turret.

== Modernization ==
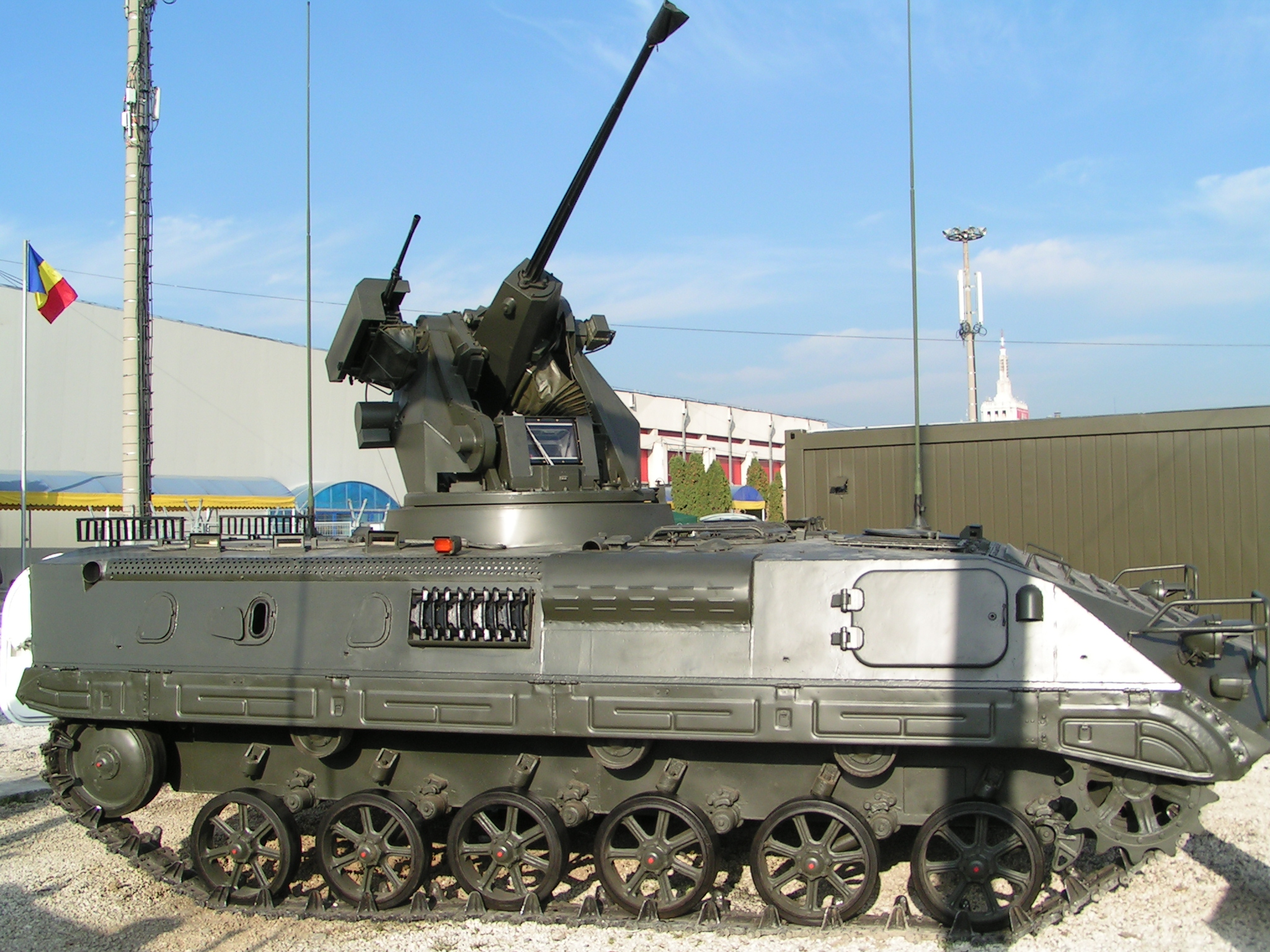
MLVM-M at Expomil 2005

A similar modernization package with MLI-84M has been proposed for MLVM and included the OWS 25R turret (Oerlikon KBA automatic Cannon-07 25 mm caliber coaxial machine gun PKT and can equip with a guided anti-tank missile launcher Spike), laser/IR illumination warning system, smoke grenades launchers, more advanced optical system, automatic transmission, Mercedes-Benz diesel engine or Deutz (approximately 400 horsepower), automatic fire extinguishing systems and improved command and control and the ability to mount additional armor plates. The weight of the new vehicle was 11.3 tons, but the maximum speed, power and autonomy were improved due to better engine performance. As a result of improvements in weaponry, the vehicle can be classified as an infantry fighting vehicle.

The result of the modernization program was a vehicle that is compatible with NATO standards. A prototype was on display at the Expomil 2005 arms and military technical exhibition.

== Variants ==
- MLVM AR - Version fitted with a 1982 120 mm mortar, installed in troops room. During firing the two shutters are opened in the side. A baseplate and bipod are carried externally on the vehicle to enable the 120 mm mortar to be deployed away from the vehicle if required by the tactical situation. The vehicle has been observed with two types of road wheel, one spoked and similar to that of the standard MLVM mountaineers combat vehicle and a second of stamped metal similar to that used on the Romanian MLI-84 infantry combat vehicle. This new variant is called the M1989, which also has a reworked superstructure with a firing port and periscope in each side, and a new rear door. Additionally, the M1982 mortar now fires forward and is directed by servomotors. This appears to be the standard type in service today.
- MLVM ABAL - vehicle intended for the transport of ammunition (2.1 tons). The turret is missing and the armament consists of a machine gun PKT. Standard equipment: NBC protection, firefighting and communications equipment.
- MLVM MEDEVAC - medical evacuation Vehicle and the granting of first aid. Superstructure and armament are similar version ABAL.
- MLVM-M - modernised version equipped with the OWS-25R turret. This prototype would not proceed past being showcased in military exhibitions.
