= Mătăsaru =

- Commune
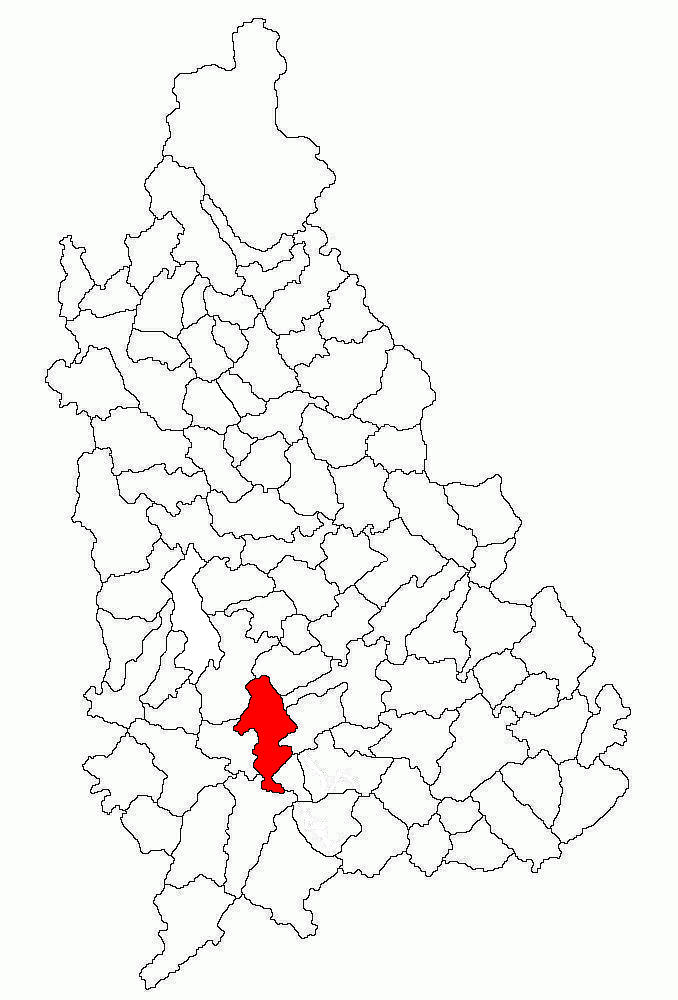
- Location in Dâmbovița County

- Location in Romania
- Coordinates: 44°43′N 25°25′E
- Country: Romania
- County: Dâmbovița

Government
  - Mayor (2020–2024): Radu Naie (PSD)
- Area: 51.14 km^{2} (19.75 sq mi)
- Elevation: 185 m (607 ft)
- Population (2021-12-01): 4,836
  - Density: 95/km^{2} (240/sq mi)
- Time zone: EET/EEST (UTC+2/+3)
- Postal code: 137302
- Area code: +(40) 245
- Vehicle reg.: DB
- Website: www.primariamatasaru-db.ro

Mătăsaru is a commune in Dâmbovița County, Muntenia, Romania with a population of 4,836 people as of 2021. It is composed of seven villages: Crețulești, Mătăsaru, Odaia Turcului, Poroinica, Puțu cu Salcie, Sălcioara, and Tețcoiu (the commune center).

The commune is situated in the Wallachian Plain, on the banks of the Argeș River. It is located in the southern part of Dâmbovița County, 30 km (19 mi) from the county seat, Târgoviște, and 66 km (41 mi) northwest of Bucharest. Mătăsaru is crossed by national road DN7, which links Bucharest with the Banat region, in western Romania.

The 1997 French–Romanian film The Crazy Stranger (Gadjo dilo ) was mostly shot in Crețulești; some of the actors were local Romani people.

Historical population
Year	Pop.	±%
2002	5,751	—
2011	5,462	−5.0%
2021	4,836	−11.5%
Source: Census data

== Natives ==
- Ioan Ioniță (1924–1987), general, communist politician, and Minister of Defense (1966–1976)
