= Bujoreni, Teleorman =

Bujoreni
- Commune
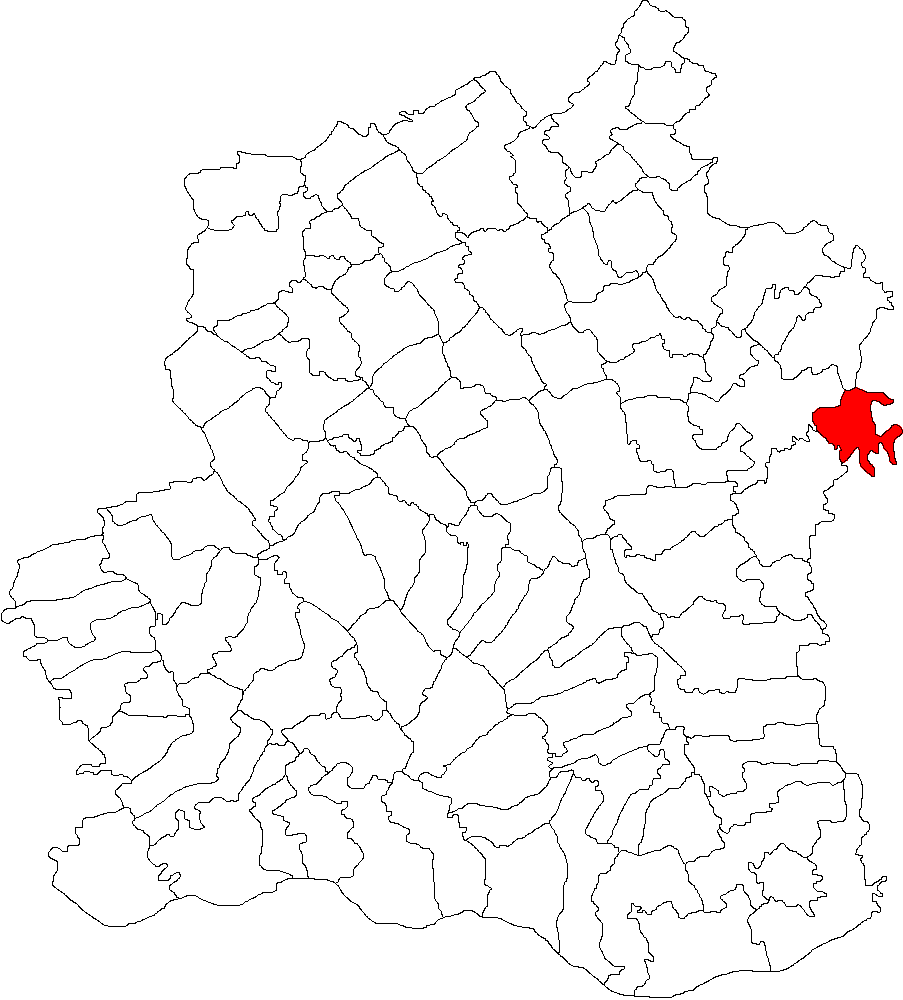
- Location in Teleorman County

- Location in Romania
- Coordinates: 44°07′N 25°39′E
- Country: Romania
- County: Teleorman
- Subdivisions: Bujoreni, Dărvaș, Prunaru
- Population (2021-12-01): 935
- Time zone: EET/EEST (UTC+2/+3)
- Vehicle reg.: TR

Bujoreni (Romanian pronunciation: [buʒoˈrenʲ]) is a commune in Teleorman County, Muntenia, Romania. It is composed of three villages: Bujoreni, Dărvaș, and Prunaru. The last one of these villages was the site of the Battle of Prunaru during the Romanian Campaign of World War I.

== Natives ==
- Ion Coman (born 1926), general, communist politician, and Minister of Defense (1976–1978)
