= List of wars involving Romania =

This is a list of wars fought by Romania since the consolidation of the Romanian principality in 1866:

== Principality of Romania (1866–1881) ==
Conflict		Belligerents		Result		Romanian commanders			
Date	Name	Allies	Enemies	Outcome	Losses	Prince	Prime Minister	Defense Minister	General Chief of Staff
24 April 1877 – 3 March 1878	Romanian War of Independence or Russo-Turkish War (1877–78)	Russian Empire; Principality of Romania; Principality of Serbia; Principality of Montenegro Co-belligerents; Bulgarian volunteers Serb rebels of Bosnia	Ottoman Empire	Victory: Treaty of San Stefano; Treaty of Berlin; Independence of Romania, Serbia and Montenegro from Ottoman Empire; Northern Dobruja passed from Ottoman Empire to Romania; Southern Bessarabia passed from Romania to Russian Empire; due to the reestablishment of the Bulgarian state, Ottoman Empire lost its common border with Romania	4,302 dead and missing 3,316 wounded 19,904 sick	Carol I	Ion C. Brătianu	Alexandru Cernat	Gheorghe Slăniceanu (until Aug. 1877); Constantin Barozzi (Aug. – Oct. 1877); Ştefan Fălcoianu (from Oct. 1877)

== Kingdom of Romania (1881–1947) ==
Conflict		Belligerents		Result		Romanian commanders			
Date	Name	Allies	Enemies	Outcome	Losses	Prince	Prime Minister	Defense Minister	General Chief of Staff
21 February – 5 April 1907	1907 Romanian Peasants' Revolt	Romanian Land Forces; Romanian Gendarmerie	Uprising peasants	Victory: Crushing of the rebellion	10 dead and 5 wounded (military) 3,000 civilian casualties	Carol I	Gheorghe Grigore Cantacuzino (until 24 March 1907); Dimitrie Sturdza (from 24 March 1907)	Alexandru Averescu	Nicolae Tătărăscu (until 1 April 1907); Grigore C. Crăiniceanu (from 1 April 1907)
29 June – 10 August 1913 Romania entered: 10 July 1913	Second Balkan War	Serbia; Greece; Romania; Montenegro Co-belligerent; Ottoman Empire	Bulgaria	Victory: Treaty of Bucharest; Romania gained Southern Dobruja	negligible combat casualties 6,000 dead of disease	Carol I	Titu Maiorescu	Constantin Harjeu	Alexandru Averescu
28 July 1914 – 11 November 1918 Romania entered: 27 August 1916 Romania temporary exited: 9 December 1917 Romania re-entered: 10 November 1918	World War I	Triple Entente France United Kingdom of Great Britain and Ireland: Australia; Canada; India; Newfoundland; New Zealand; South Africa; Russia (1914–1917) Italy (1915–1918); Japan; Romania (1916–1918); Serbia; Belgium; Greece (1917–1918); Portugal (1916–1918); Montenegro (1914–1916) (Republic of China (1912–1949)) China (1917–1918); Siam (1917–1918) Co-belligerents United States (1917–1918) Kingdom of Hejaz (1916–1918) Emirate of Nejd and Hasa; Idrisid Emirate of Asir (1915–1918); Nepal; Brazil (1917–1918); Transcaucasian Democratic Federative Republic; Democratic Republic of Armenia; Monaco; Cuba; Panama; Guatemala; Nicaragua; Costa Rica; Haiti; Honduras Supply only Liberia (1917–1918) Diplomatic only Peru; Bolivia; Uruguay; Ecuador; San Marino Active neutrality Norway Venezuela	Central Powers; Germany: Togoland (1914); German Samoa (1914); German New Guinea (1914); Tsingtao (1914); German South-West Africa (1914–1915); Kamerun (1914–1916); German East Africa; Austria-Hungary; Ottoman Empire; Bulgaria (1915–1918) Co-belligerents Emirate of Jabal Shammar; Dervish state Sultanate of Darfur; Senussi (1915–1917) Mountainous Republic of the Northern Caucasus (1917–1918); Kuban People's Republic (1918); Democratic Republic of Georgia (1918) Azerbaijan Democratic Republic (1918)	Defeat: Armistice of Focșani; Treaty of Buftea; Bulgaria recovered Southern Dobruja and gained the southern part of Northern Dobruja; The northern part of Northern Dobruja was placed under the joint control of the Central Powers; Austria-Hungary gained the passes of the Carpathian Mountains; Romania leased its oil wells to Germany for 90 years.; The Central Powers recognized the Union of Bessarabia with Romania	535,706	Ferdinand I	Ion I. C. Brătianu	Constantin Iancovescu	Vasile Zottu (until Oct. 1916); Dumitru Iliescu (Oct. – Dec. 1916); Constantin Prezan (from Dec. 1916)
28 July 1914 – 11 November 1918 Romania entered: 27 August 1916 Romania temporary exited: 9 December 1917 Romania re-entered: 10 November 1918	World War I			Victory: Armistice of 11 November 1918; Treaty of Versailles; Treaty of Saint-Germain-en-Laye; Treaty of Neuilly-sur-Seine; Treaty of Trianon; anullement of the Treaty of Buftea; Creation of Greater Romania	535,706	Ferdinand I	Constantin Coandă	Eremia Grigorescu	Constantin Prezan
1 November 1918 – 17 July 1919 Romania entered: 11 November 1918 Romania exited: 11 June 1919	Polish–Ukrainian War	Poland Romania Only police troops Czechoslovakia (1918–1919) Hungarian Democratic Republic (1919)	(Ukraine) West Ukrainian People's Republic Ukrainian People's Republic Co-belligerents (Ukraine) Hutsul Republic (1919) (Ukraine) Komancza Republic Active neutrality Czechoslovakia (1919)	Victory: Romania secured Northern Bukovina; Temporary Romanian occupation of Pokuttya; Ukrainian state failed to stabilize, therefore USSR gained access to common border with Romania; Poland became ally of Romania	negligible	Ferdinand I	Constantin Coandă (until Nov. 1918); Ion I. C. Brătianu (from Nov. 1918)	Eremia Grigorescu (until Nov. 1918); Artur Văitoianu (from Nov. 1918)	Constantin Prezan
7 January – 1 February 1919	Khotyn Uprising	Romanian Land Forces; Romanian Gendarmerie	Ukrainian and Moldovan insurgents: Ukrainian People's Republic	Victory: Crushing of the rebellion	up to 15,000 deaths	Ferdinand I	Ion I. C. Brătianu	Artur Văitoianu	Constantin Prezan
15 April – 6 August 1919	Hungarian–Romanian War	Romania Co-belligerents; Czechoslovakia; Kingdom of Serbs, Croats and Slovenes	Hungarian Soviet Republic Active neutrality Soviet Russia	Victory: Romania secured Transylvania; Collapse of the Hungarian Soviet Republic; Hungary became enemy of Romania; Yugoslavia and Czechoslovakia became allies of Romania	3,610 dead 11,666 total	Ferdinand I	Ion I. C. Brătianu	Artur Văitoianu	Constantin Prezan
27–28 May 1919	Bender Uprising	Romanian Land Forces; Romanian Gendarmerie	Bolsheviks; Active neutrality Soviet Russia	Victory: Crushing of the rebellion	unknown	Ferdinand I	Ion I. C. Brătianu	Artur Văitoianu	Constantin Prezan
20–28 October 1920	1920 Romanian General Strike	Romanian Land Forces; Romanian Gendarmerie	Bolsheviks	Victory: Crushing of the rebellion	unknown	Alexandru Averescu	Ioan Rășcanu	Constantin Cristescu	Constantin Prezan
15–18 September 1924	Tatarbunary Uprising	Romanian Land Forces; Romanian Gendarmerie; Romanian Naval Forces	Bolsheviks; Active neutrality Soviet Union	Victory: Crushing of the rebellion	3,000 civilian casualties	Ion I. C. Brătianu	George Mărdărescu	Alexandru Lupescu	Alexandru Gorski
5–6 August 1929	Lupeni Strike	Romanian Land Forces; Romanian Gendarmerie	Coal miners	Victory: Crushing of the rebellion	10 soldiers wounded 15 gendarmes wounded 22 miners dead 23 miners gravely wounded 30 miners lightly wounded	Michael I	Iuliu Maniu	Henry Cihoschi	Nicolae Samsonovici
12–16 February 1933	Grivița Strike	Romanian Land Forces; Romanian Gendarmerie	Communists	Victory: Crushing of the rebellion	2 soldiers dead 7 workers dead 20 workers wounded	Carol II	Alexandru Vaida-Voevod	Nicolae Samsonovici	Constantin Lăzărescu
21–23 January 1941	Legionnaires' Rebellion and Bucharest Pogrom	Romanian Land Forces; Romanian Police	Iron Guard; Romanian Police	Victory: Crushing of the rebellion	30 soldiers dead 200–800 legionnaires dead or wounded 125 Jews dead in pogrom	Michael I	Ion Antonescu		Alexandru Ioaniţiu
1–2 September 1945 Romania entered: 22 June 1941 Romania switched sides: 23 August 1944 Romania exited: 9 May 1945	World War II	Axis Germany; Italy (1940–1943): Italian North Africa (1943); Italian East Africa (until 1941); Japan Affiliate states Romania (1941–1944); Hungary (1941–1945); Bulgaria (1941–1944); Thailand (1942–1945) Co-belligerents; Finland (1941–1944); Vichy France (1940–1944); Iran (1941); Iraq (1941) Client states: Italian Social Republic (1943–1945); Slovak Republic; Serbia (1941–1944); Croatia (1941–1945); Greece (1941–1944); Albania (1939–1944); Syria (1941); Greater Lebanon (1941); Manchukuo; Reorganized National Government of China (1940–1945); Mengjiang; Second Philippine Republic (1943–1945); State of Burma (1943–1945); Free India (1943–1945); Active neutrality Soviet Union (1939–1940); Spanish State; Denmark (1940–1945); Monaco French Morocco (1940–1942)	Allies United States (1941–1945): Commonwealth of the Philippines (1941); Soviet Union (1941–1945): Ukrainian SSR (1941, 1943–1945); Byelorussian SSR (1941, 1943–1945); United Kingdom: Australia; Canada; India; New Zealand; South Africa; British Somaliland (1939–1940, 1941–1945); Southern Rhodesia; Western Samoa; Straits Settlements (1939–1942); Federated Malay States (1939–1942); Northern Rhodesia; Nyasaland; France (1939–1940, 1944–1945); China Poland (1939); Denmark (1940); Norway (1940); Belgium (1940): Belgian Congo (1940–1941); Luxembourg (1940); Netherlands (1940): (Netherlands) Dutch East Indies (1940–1942); Greece (1940–1941); Kingdom of Yugoslavia (1941): Democratic Federal Yugoslavia (1943–1945); Egypt (1940–1945) Nepal; Cuba (1941–1945); Brazil (1942–1945); Mexico (1942–1945); Ethiopia (1942–1945); Portuguese Timor (1942–1945); Colombia (1943–1945) Co-belligerents; Italy (1943–1945); Romania (1944–1945); Finland (1944–1945); Bulgaria (1944–1945) Mongolia (1939); Finland (1939–1940); Estonia (1940); Latvia (1940); Lithuania (1940); Romania (1940) Client state Tuvan People's Republic (1941–1944) Supply only Bahrain; Haiti (1941–1945); Honduras (1941–1945); Dominican Republic (1941–1945); Nicaragua (1941–1945); Iraq (1942–1945); Bolivia (1943–1945); Liberia (1944–1945) Diplomatic only Oman; Panama (1941–1945); Costa Rica (1941–1945); El Salvador (1941–1945); Guatemala (1941–1945); Iran (1943–1945) Governments in exile Poland (1939–1945); Norway (1940–1945); Belgium (1940–1944); Free France (1940–1944); Luxembourg (1940–1944); Netherlands (1940–1945) (Kingdom of Greece) Greece (1941–1944) (Kingdom of Yugoslavia) Yugoslavia (1941–1945); Czechoslovakia; Korea Active neutrality Iceland; French Morocco (1939–1940, 1942–1945); Tonga	Defeat: King Michael's Coup; Soviet occupation of Romania; Paris Peace Treaties, 1947; Romania lost again Bessarabia and Northern Bukovina, to USSR, back to the border of 1940; Second Vienna Award was annulled (Romania re-gained control of Northern Transylvania, lost to Hungary in 1940); Bulgaria kept control of Southern Dobruja, as of 1940; Communist regime installed in Romania	300,000 soldiers dead 64,000 civilians dead 469,000 Jews died in Holocaust	Michael I	Ion Antonescu (until Aug. 1944)	Iosif Iacobici (until Sep. 1942) Ion Antonescu (Sep. 1941 – Jan. 1942); Constantin Pantazi (Jan. 1942 – Aug. 1944)	Alexandru Ioaniţiu (until Sep. 1941); Iosif Iacobici (Sep. 1941 – Jan. 1942); Ilie Șteflea (Jan. 1942 – Aug. 1944)

== Romanian People's Republic (1947–1965) ==
Conflict		Belligerents		Result		Romanian commanders			
Date	Name	Allies	Enemies	Outcome	Losses	Prince	Prime Minister	Defense Minister	General Chief of Staff
1944–1962	Romanian anti-communist resistance movement	Kingdom of Romania (until 1947); Romanian People's Republic (from 1947): PCR; Securitate; Supported by: Soviet Union	Anti-communist groups: Nationalists; Monarchists; National Peasantists; Iron Guards; Supported by: United States; United Kingdom; CNR	Romanian government victory: Insurgency suppressed	official number estimates 2000	Constantin Ion Parhon (until Jun. 1952); Petru Groza (Jun. 1952 – Jan. 1958); Ion Gheorghe Maurer (Jan. 1958 – Mar. 1961); Gheorghe Gheorghiu-Dej (from Mar. 1961)	Petru Groza (until Jun. 1952); Gheorghe Gheorghiu-Dej (Jun. 1952 – Oct. 1955); Chivu Stoica (Oct. 1955 – Mar. 1961); Ion Gheorghe Maurer (from Mar. 1961)	Emil Bodnăraș (until Oct. 1955); Leontin Sălăjan (from Oct. 1955)	Constantin Gh. Popescu (until Mar. 1950); Leontin Sălăjan (Mar. 1950 – Apr. 1954); Ion Tutoveanu (from Apr. 1954)

== Socialist Republic of Romania (1965–1989) ==
Conflict		Belligerents		Result		Romanian commanders			
Date	Name	Allies	Enemies	Outcome	Losses	Prince	Prime Minister	Defense Minister	General Chief of Staff
15–16 November 1987	Brașov Rebellion	Directorate for Security Troops; Romanian Land Forces; Romanian Police	Romanian anti-communists	Defeat: Crushing of the rebellion	no casualties	Nicolae Ceaușescu	Constantin Dăscălescu	Vasile Milea	Ștefan Gușă
16–30 December 1989	Romanian Revolution	(Romania) Government: Securitate (until 22 December 1989); Communist Party loyalists; Army of the Socialist Republic of Romania (until 22 December 1989)	Revolutionaries: Anti-communists; Communist Party dissidents; After 22 December 1989: National Salvation Front; Romanian Armed Forces	Revolutionary victory: End of Communist regime in Romania; Execution of Nicolae Ceaușescu	1,104 dead 3,352 wounded	Nicolae Ceaușescu (until 22 Dec. 1989); Council of the National Salvation Front (22–26 Dec. 1989); Ion Iliescu (from 26 Dec. 1989)	Constantin Dăscălescu (until 22 Dec. 1989); Petre Roman (from 26 Dec. 1989)	Vasile Milea (until 22 Dec. 1989); Nicolae Militaru (from 22 Dec. 1989)	Ștefan Gușă

== Post-communist Romania (since 1989) ==
Conflict		Belligerents		Result		Romanian commanders			
Date	Name	Allies	Enemies	Outcome	Losses	Prince	Prime Minister	Defense Minister	General Chief of Staff
March 2003 – 23 July 2009	Iraq War	MNF–I: United States; United Kingdom; Australia (2003–2009); Poland (2003–2008); Albania (2004–2008); Armenia (2005–2008); Azerbaijan (2004–2008); Bosnia and Herzegovina (2005–2008); Bulgaria (2004–2008); Croatia (2004–2008); Czech Republic (2004–2008); Denmark (2004–2007); Dominican Republic (2004–2004); El Salvador(2004–2009); Estonia (2005–2009); Georgia (2004–2008); Honduras (2004–2004); Hungary (2004–2005); Iceland (2004–unknown); Italy (2004–2006); Japan (2004–2008); Kazakhstan (2004–2008); Latvia (2004–2008); Lithuania (2004–2007); Republic of Macedonia (2004–2008); Moldova (2004–2008); Mongolia (2004–2008); Netherlands (2004–2005); New Zealand (2004–2004); Nicaragua (2004–2004); Norway (2004–2006); Philippines (2004–2004); Portugal (2004–2005); Romania(2004–2009); Singapore (2004–2008); Slovakia (2004–2007); South Korea (2004–2008); Spain (2004–2004); Thailand (2004–2004); Tonga (2004–2008); Ukraine (2004–2008); Iraqi National Congress; New Iraqi government: Iraqi Armed Forces; Awakening Council; Iraqi Kurdistan: Peshmerga	Ba'athist Iraq; Ansar al-Islam Supreme Command for Jihad and Liberation; Army of the Men of the Naqshbandi Order Sunni insurgents: Islamic State of Iraq; Islamic Army of Iraq; Ansar al-Sunnah; Shia insurgents: Mahdi Army; Special Groups; Asa'ib Ahl al-Haq; Others; For fighting between insurgent groups, see Civil war in Iraq (2006–07).	Victory: Invasion and occupation of Iraq; Overthrow of Ba'ath Party government and execution of Saddam Hussein; Iraqi insurgency, emergence of al-Qaeda in Iraq, and civil war; Subsequent depletion of al-Qaeda in Iraq, improvements in public security, Iraqi insurgency persists; Establishment of democratic elections and formation of new Shia led government; U.S.–Iraq Status of Forces Agreement; Escalation of sectarian insurgency after U.S. withdrawal and spillover with the Syrian Civil War; Resurgence of Islamic State of Iraq, the successor of al-Qaeda in Iraq	3 soldiers killed.	Ion Iliescu (until Dec. 2004); Traian Băsescu (from Dec. 2004)	Adrian Năstase (until Dec. 2004) Călin Popescu-Tăriceanu (Dec. 2004 – Dec. 2008); Emil Boc (from Dec. 2008)	Ioan Mircea Pașcu (until Dec. 2004); Teodor Atanasiu (Dec. 2004 – Oct. 2006); Sorin Frunzăverde (Oct. 2006 – Apr. 2007); Teodor Meleșcanu (Apr. 2007 – Dec. 2008); Mihai Stănișoară (from Dec. 2008)	Mihail Eugen Popescu (until Oct. 2004); Eugen Bădălan (Oct. 2004 – Sep. 2006); Gheorghe Marin (from. Sep. 2006); Ștefan Dănilă (from Jan. 2011); Nicolae Ciucă (from Jan. 2015); Daniel Petrescu (from Nov. 2019)
7 October 2001 – 16 August 2021	War in Afghanistan (2001–2021)	ISAF; RS	Taliban; Al-Qaeda	Defeat: Defeat of the Taliban government in Afghanistan and fall of the Islamic Emirate of Afghanistan.; Destruction of al-Qaeda camps.; Establishment of new Afghan government and creation of the new Afghan National Army.; Fall of Kabul.; Ongoing Taliban insurgency.	23 soldiers killed.	Ion Iliescu (2001–2004); Traian Băsescu (2004–2014); Klaus Iohannis (2014–)	Adrian Năstase (2001–2004); Călin Popescu Tăriceanu (2004–2008); Emil Boc (2008–2012); Victor Ponta (2012–)	Ioan Mircea Pașcu (2001–2004); Teodor Atanasiu (2004–2006); Sorin Frunzăverde (2006–2007); Teodor Meleșcanu (2007–2008); Mihai Stănișoară (2008–2009); Gabriel Oprea (2009–2012); Corneliu Dobrițoiu (2012); Mircea Dușa (2015–)	Mihail Eugen Popescu (until Oct. 2004); Eugen Bădălan (Oct. 2004 – Sep. 2006); Gheorghe Marin (from. Sep. 2006); Ștefan Dănilă (from Jan. 2011); Nicolae Ciucă (from Jan. 2015); Daniel Petrescu (from Nov. 2019)
19 March – 23 October 2011	2011 military intervention in Libya	NATO; Jordan; Qatar; United Arab Emirates; Libyan National Council	Libyan Arab Jamahiriya	Victory: Overthrow of the Gaddafi government.	no casualties.	Ion Iliescu (2001–2004); Traian Băsescu (2004–2014); Klaus Iohannis (2014–)	Adrian Năstase (2001–2004); Călin Popescu Tăriceanu (2004–2008); Emil Boc (2008–2012); Victor Ponta (2012–)	Ioan Mircea Pașcu (2001–2004); Teodor Atanasiu (2004–2006); Sorin Frunzăverde (2006–2007); Teodor Meleșcanu (2007–2008); Mihai Stănișoară (2008–2009); Gabriel Oprea (2009–2012); Corneliu Dobrițoiu (2012); Mircea Dușa (2015–)	Mihail Eugen Popescu (until Oct. 2004); Eugen Bădălan (Oct. 2004 – Sep. 2006); Gheorghe Marin (from. Sep. 2006); Ștefan Dănilă (from Jan. 2011); Nicolae Ciucă (from Jan. 2015); Daniel Petrescu (from Nov. 2019)
