= Mircea Chelaru =

Romanian general and politician

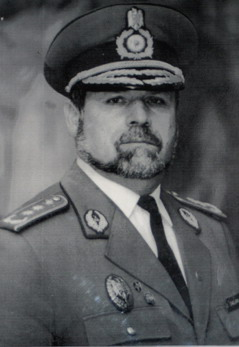
- Mircea Chelaru

44th Chief of the Romanian General Staff
- In office 7 March 2000 – 31 October 2000
- President: Emil Constantinescu
- Prime Minister: Mugur Isărescu
- Preceded by: Constantin Degeratu
- Succeeded by: Mihail Eugen Popescu

Personal details
- Born: 3 July 1949 (age 77) Breazu, Iași County, Romanian People's Republic
- Party: Romanian Nationhood Party
- Other political affiliations: Romanian National Unity Party; Alliance for the Union of Romanians
- Education: Nicolae Bălcescu Land Forces Academy; Carol I National Defence University
- Profession: Military Officer

Military service
- Rank: Lieutenant general

Mircea Chelaru (born 3 July 1949) is a Romanian general and politician. He was a member of the Alliance for the Union of Romanians (AUR).

== Early life ==
Chelaru was born in Breazu village, in Rediu commune, Iași County and attended the Vasile Alecsandri High School in Iași, followed by the Ștefan cel Mare Military School in Câmpulung Moldovenesc.

== Military career ==
He graduated from the Nicolae Bălcescu Land Forces Academy in Sibiu in 1970 and the Military Academy in Bucharest in 1976. He advanced in rank to lieutenant (1970), captain (1977), lieutenant colonel (1989), colonel (1990), brigadier general (1997), major general (1990), and lieutenant general (2000), going into the reserves in 2001. Chelaru served as Chief of the Romanian General Staff from 7 March to 31 October 2000.

== Political career ==
=== Member of the Chamber of Deputies (2020–2024) ===
In the 2020 Romanian parliamentary election on 6 December, Chelaru was elected a member of the Champer of Deputies for the AUR party in Botoșani County, taking office on 21 December.

=== Member of the Chamber of Deputies (2024–present) ===
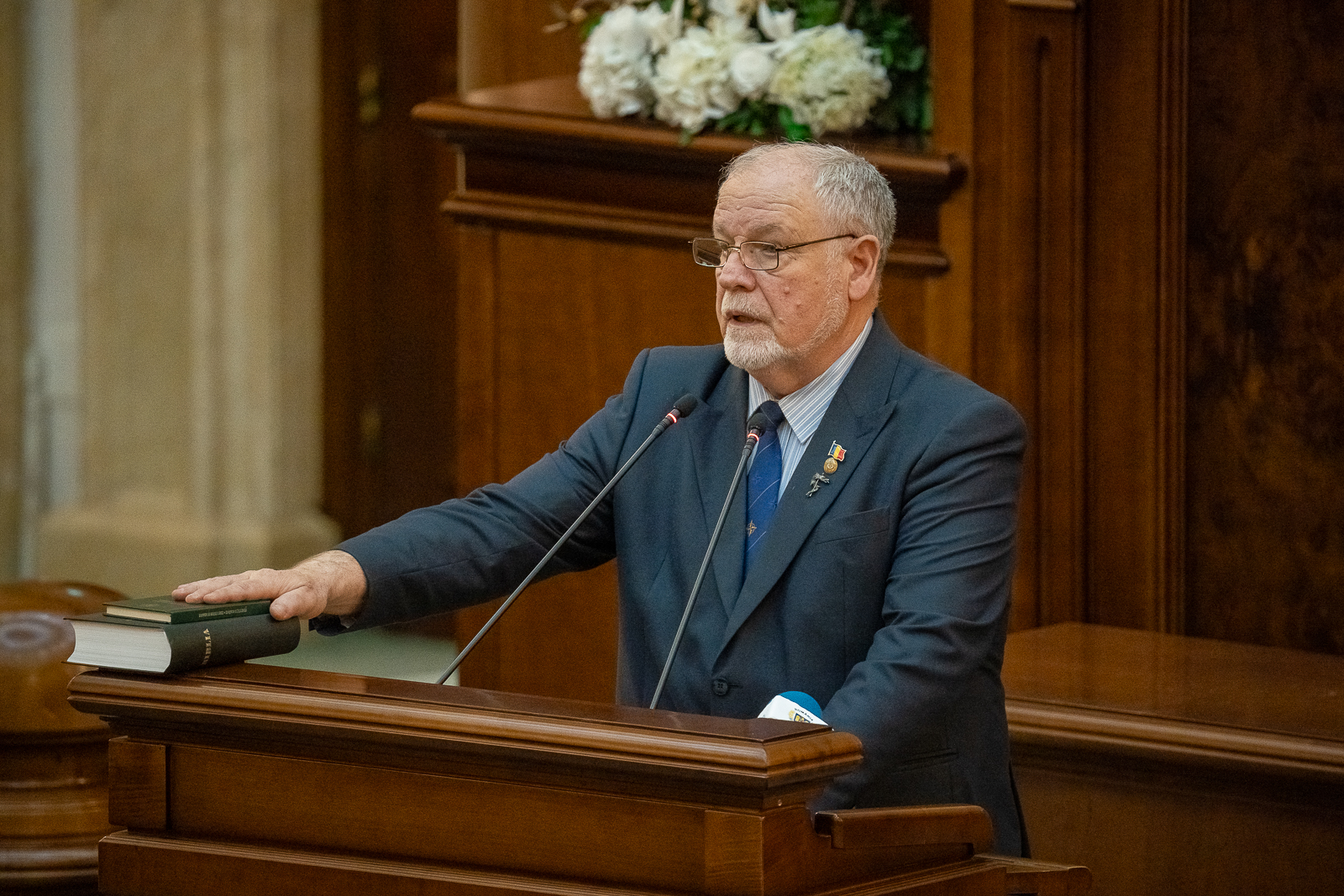
Chelaru taking the oath of office in the Senate, 21 December 2024

In the 2024 Romanian parliamentary election on 1 December, Chelaru was elected a member of the Champer of Deputies for the AUR party in Argeș County, taking office on 21 December.
