= Commander of the Navy (Romania) =

Chief of the Romanian Naval Forces
- Șeful Statului Major al Forțelor Navale

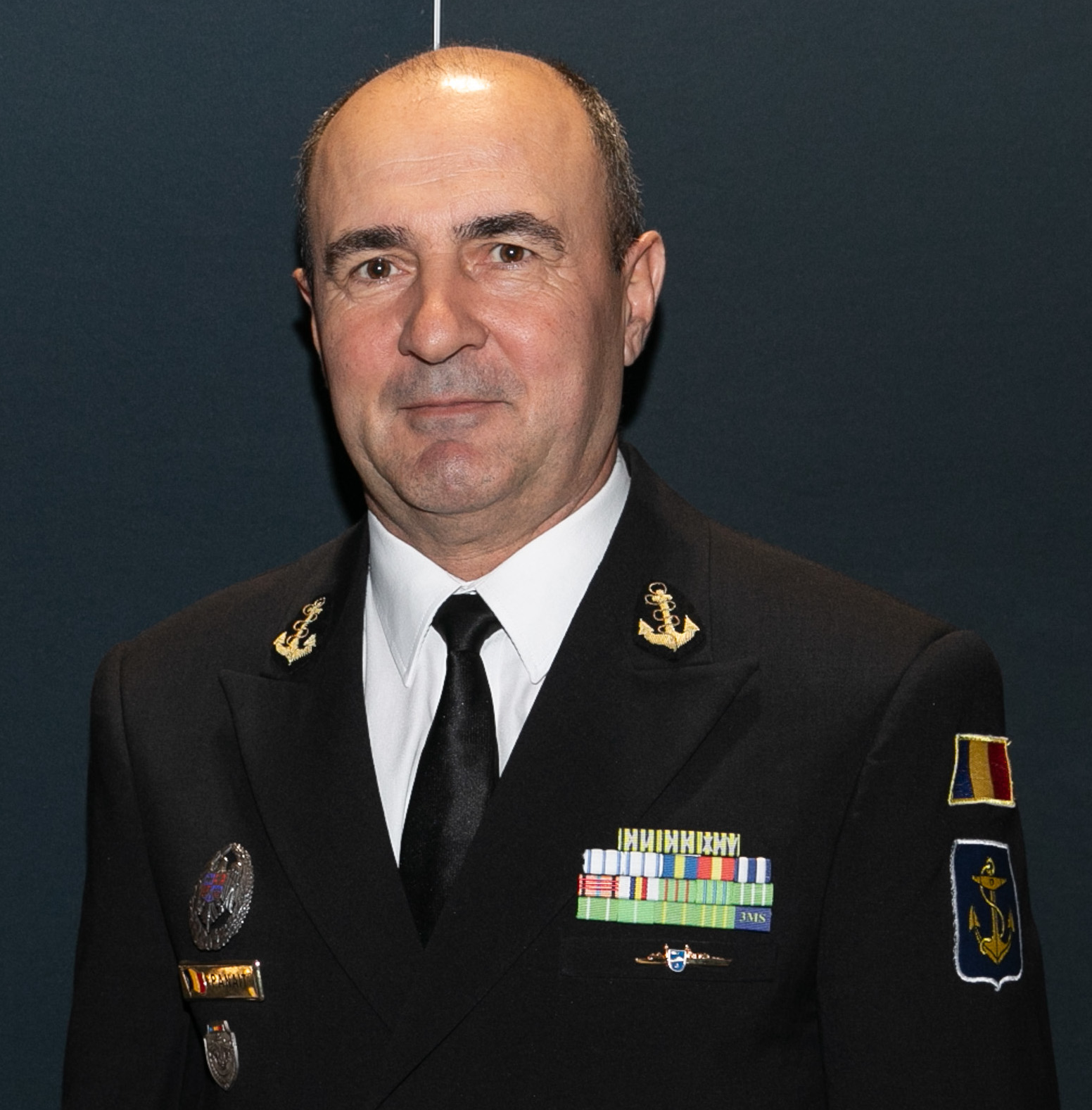
- Incumbent; Vice Admiral Mihai Panait; Acting since 1 July 2020
- Romanian Naval Forces
- Reports to: Chief of the General Staff
- Residence: Chief of Staff of Romanian Naval Forces
- Seat: Bucharest
- Nominator: President of Romania through presidential decree, with Minister of National Defence recommendation
- Appointer: Minister of National Defence
- Formation: 22 October 1860
- First holder: Colonel of the United Principalities Flotilla Nicolae Steriade
- Website: https://www.navy.ro/despre/conducere_en.php

The Commander of the Romanian Navy (Romanian: Comandant al Marinei Militare Române) is the chief commanding authority of the Romanian Navy. The position dates to the period of the United Principalities. The current Commander of the Romanian Navy, since 1 July 2020, is Mihai Panait.

== List of Commanders ==
=== United Principalities (1860–1881) ===
No.	Portrait	Name	Took office	Left office	Time in office	Ref.
1	Nicolae Steriade [ro]	Colonel; Nicolae Steriade	22 October 1860	27 December 1863	3 years, 66 days	
2	Constantin Petrescu [ro]	Colonel; Constantin Petrescu	27 December 1863	11 February 1866	2 years, 46 days	–
3	Scarlat Murguleț [ro]	Major; Scarlat Murguleț (1831–?)	17 March 1867	30 April 1867	44 days	
4	Anton Barbieri [ro]	Major; Anton Barbieri	17 March 1867	30 April 1867	44 days	
5	Emanoil Boteanu [ro]	Major; Emanoil Boteanu (1836–1897)	30 April 1867	1 January 1874	6 years, 246 days	
6	Nicolae Dimitrescu-Maican [ro]	General; Nicolae Dimitrescu-Maican (1846–1902)	1 January 1874	10 December 1874	343 days	
7	Ioan Murgescu [ro]	Counter admiral Ioan Murgescu (1846–1913)	10 December 1874	1 April 1877	2 years, 112 days	
(6)	Nicolae Dimitrescu-Maican [ro]	General; Nicolae Dimitrescu-Maican (1846–1902)	1 April 1877	1 December 1877	244 days	
(7)	Ioan Murgescu [ro]	Counter admiral Ioan Murgescu (1846–1913)	1 December 1877	8 April 1879	1 year, 128 days	
(6)	Nicolae Dimitrescu-Maican [ro]	General; Nicolae Dimitrescu-Maican (1846–1902)	8 April 1879	14 March 1881	1 year, 340 days	

=== Kingdom of Romania (1881–1947) ===
No.	Portrait	Name	Took office	Left office	Time in office	Ref.
1	Nicolae Dimitrescu-Maican [ro]	General; Nicolae Dimitrescu-Maican (1846–1902)	14 March 1881	10 May 1888	7 years, 57 days	
2	Ioan Murgescu [ro]	Counter admiral Ioan Murgescu (1846–1913)	10 May 1888	1 April 1901	12 years, 326 days	
3	Emanoil Koslinski [ro]	Counter admiral Emanoil Koslinski (1853–1909)	1 April 1901	1 April 1909 †	8 years, 0 days	
4	Eustațiu Sebastian	Counter admiral Eustațiu Sebastian (1856–1943)	1 April 1909	9 January 1917	7 years, 283 days	
5	Nicolae Negru [ro]	Commodore; Nicolae Negru	9 January 1917	1 June 1918	1 year, 143 days	
6	Constantin Bălescu [ro]	Vice admiral Constantin Bălescu (1864–1929)	1 June 1918	3 November 1920	2 years, 155 days	
7	Constantin Niculescu-Rizea [ro]	Counter admiral Constantin Niculescu-Rizea	3 November 1920	30 October 1925	4 years, 361 days	
8	Vasile Scodrea [ro]	Vice admiral Vasile Scodrea (1872–1934)	30 October 1925	13 January 1934	8 years, 75 days	
9	Ioan Bălănescu [ro]	Vice admiral Ioan Bălănescu	13 January 1934	2 November 1937	3 years, 293 days	
10	Petre Bărbuneanu [ro]	Admiral; Petre Bărbuneanu (1881–1979)	2 November 1937	6 September 1940	2 years, 309 days	
11	Eugeniu Roșca [ro]	Vice admiral Eugeniu Roșca (?–1950)	21 September 1940	16 June 1942	1 year, 268 days	
12	Ioan Georgescu [ro]	Vice admiral Ioan Georgescu (1891–1977)	16 June 1942	27 March 1945	2 years, 284 days	
(10)	Petre Bărbuneanu [ro]	Admiral; Petre Bărbuneanu (1881–1979)	27 March 1945	10 December 1946	1 year, 258 days	
13	Eugeniu Săvulescu [ro]	Commodore; Eugeniu Săvulescu	10 December 1946	30 December 1947	1 year, 20 days	

=== Socialist Republic of Romania (1947–1989) ===
No.	Portrait	Name	Took office	Left office	Time in office	Ref.
1	Eugeniu Săvulescu [ro]	Commodore; Eugeniu Săvulescu	30 December 1947	1 November 1948	307 days	
2	Ioan Cristescu [ro]	Commodore; Ioan Cristescu	15 December 1948	25 August 1949	253 days	
3	Emil Grecescu [ro]	Vice admiral Emil Grecescu (1905–1981)	25 August 1949	20 September 1952	3 years, 26 days	
4	Florea Diaconu [ro]	Counter admiral Florea Diaconu (1922–1980)	20 September 1952	13 April 1954	1 year, 205 days	
5	Mihail Nicolae [ro]	Counter admiral Mihail Nicolae (1920–?)	13 April 1954	18 March 1959	4 years, 339 days	
(4)	Florea Diaconu [ro]	Counter admiral Florea Diaconu (1922–1980)	30 March 1959	19 April 1961	2 years, 20 days	
6	Gheorghe Sandu [ro]	Vice admiral Gheorghe Sandu (1921–2000)	19 April 1961	29 November 1963	2 years, 224 days	
7	Grigore Marteș [ro]	Vice admiral Grigore Marteș (1914–1973)	29 November 1963	4 July 1973	9 years, 217 days	
8	Sebastian Ulmeanu [ro]	Vice admiral Sebastian Ulmeanu (1929–1979)	13 December 1973	21 March 1979	5 years, 98 days	
9	Ioan Mușat [ro]	Vice admiral Ioan Mușat (1929–1979)	21 March 1979	30 December 1989	10 years, 284 days	

=== Romania (1989–present) ===
No.	Portrait	Name	Took office	Left office	Time in office	Ref.
1	Mihai Aron [ro]	Admiral; Mihai Aron (1927–1994)	30 December 1989	12 April 1990	103 days	
2	Gheorghe Anghelescu [ro]	Vice admiral Gheorghe Anghelescu (1934–2008)	26 April 1990	1 May 1997	7 years, 5 days	
3	Traian Atanasiu [ro]	Vice admiral Traian Atanasiu (born 1947)	1 May 1997	1 January 2002	4 years, 245 days	
4	Corneliu Rudencu [ro]	Admiral; Corneliu Rudencu (born 1947)	1 January 2002	31 March 2004	2 years, 90 days	
5	Gheorghe Marin	Admiral; Gheorghe Marin (born 1952)	1 April 2004	13 September 2006	2 years, 165 days	
6	Dorin Dănilă	Counter admiral Dorin Dănilă (born 1953)	3 November 2006	1 July 2010	3 years, 240 days	–
7	Aurel Popa [ro]	Vice admiral Aurel Popa (born 1954)	1 July 2010	20 December 2013	3 years, 172 days	
8	Alexandru Mîrșu	Counter admiral Alexandru Mîrșu	20 December 2013	24 November 2015	1 year, 338 days	
9	Daniel Căpățînă	Counter admiral Daniel Căpățînă	23 November 2015	1 July 2020	4 years, 221 days	
10	Mihai Panait	Vice admiral Mihai Panait (born 1968)	1 July 2020	Incumbent	6 years, 68 days	
