= Birtalan =

Birtalan is a Hungarian surname. Notable people with the surname include:

- Ákos Birtalan (1962–2011), Romanian economist and politician
- Balázs Birtalan (1969–2016), Hungarian writer, poet, publicist and psychotherapist
- Botond Birtalan (born 1989), Hungarian footballer
- Ștefan Birtalan (1948–2024), Romanian handball player
