= Beculești =

Beculeşti may refer to several villages in Romania:

- Beculeşti, a village in Ciomăgești Commune, Argeș County
- Beculeşti, a village in Cârlogani Commune, Olt County
