= Daniel Petrescu =

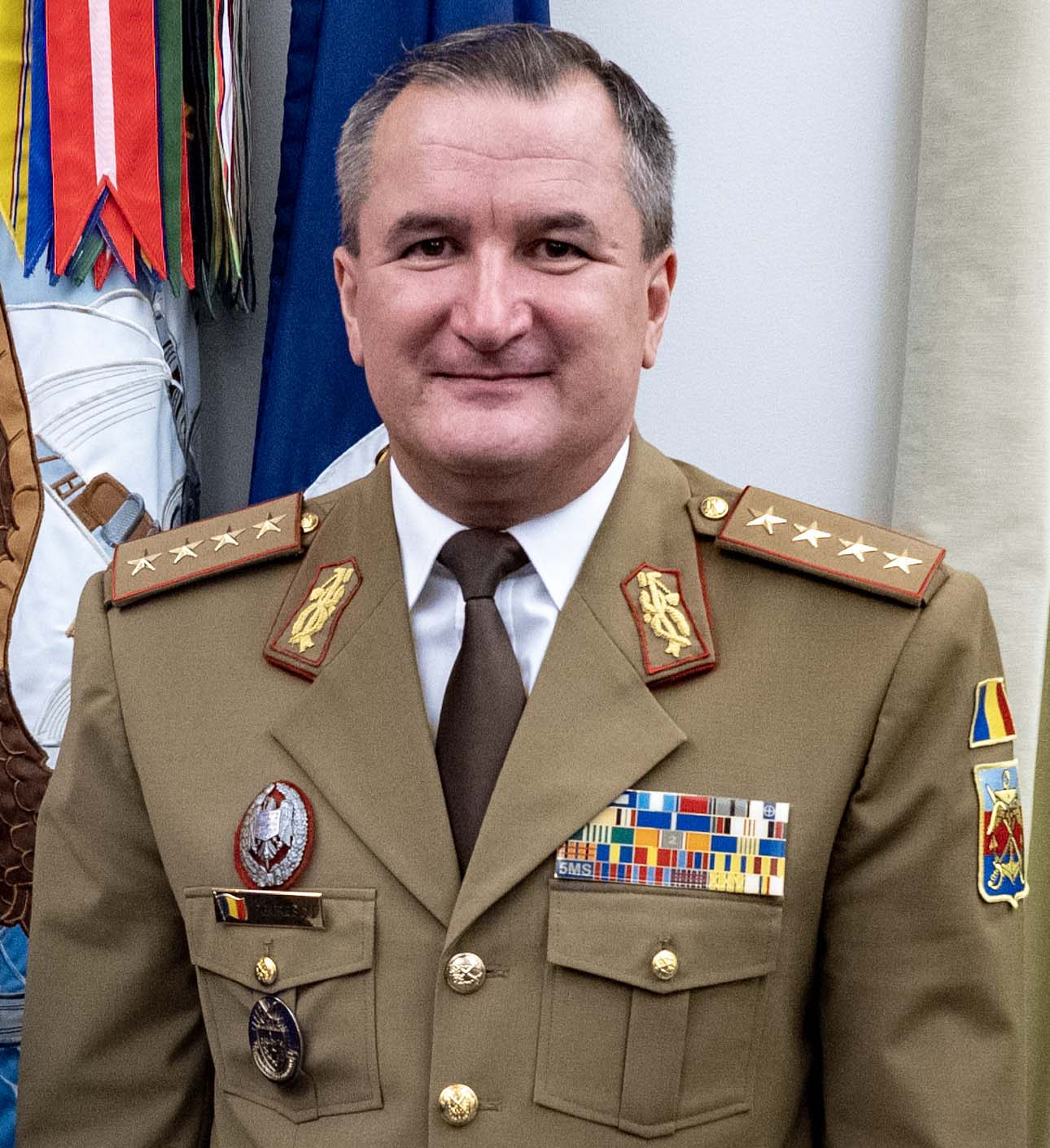
Petrescu in 2023.

Daniel Petrescu (born January 26, 1971, in Pitești, Argeș County) is a Romanian general, who served as Chief of the Romanian General Staff of the Romanian Armed Forces from 2019 to 2023.

== Military career ==
He was born on January 26, 1971, Pitești, Argeș County. Petrescu graduated in 1992 from the Romanian Military Institute of Infantry. He also completed a degree at the Carol I National Defence University in Bucharest in 2003. After his training, he served in various positions with the 2nd Infantry Battalion, most recently as its commander from 2004 to 2008. During this time, he participated in several overseas missions (including KFOR, MONUA, and ISAF). In 2008, he transferred to the General Staff. Between 2010 and 2011, Petrescu earned a master's degree from the National War College and received his doctorate in military science from the National Defence University in 2010. Until 2016 he was involved in the planning of Romania's foreign deployments in various positions.

From August 2016 to August 2017, he was commander of the 2nd Mountain Troops Brigade. Between 2017 and 2019, he commanded the Headquarters Multinational Division South-East. From August 2019 to December 2019, he was deputy commander of the Romanian Armed Forces, until he was appointed commander at the end of the year, succeeding Nicolae Ciucă. Petrescu was appointed Chief of General Staff in December 2019. He was succeeded in this post by Gheorghiță Vlad on 30 November 2023.

In March 2024, he joined the Center for European Policy Analysis (CEPA) as a member of its International Leadership Council (ILC). Since 2026, he has been a Senior Strategic Advisor to the Defence and Aerospace Advisory Team at PwC Central and Eastern Europe.

== Awards and honors ==
Officer of the National Order of Faithful Service
Badge of Honour of the Bundeswehr
National Order "For Merit"
Order of Military Virtue
Order of the Star of Romania
