= Mihail Eugen Popescu =

Mihail-Eugeniu Popescu
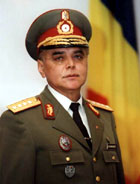
- Born: April 1, 1948; Cârlogani, Olt County, Romania
- Died: June 20, 2013 (aged 65) Vatra Dornei, Suceava County, Romania
- Branch: Romanian Land Forces
- Rank: General of the Army

Mihail-Eugeniu Popescu (April 1, 1948 – June 20, 2013) was a Romanian Land Forces general and politician, who served as Chief of the Romanian General Staff from 2000 to 2004.

== Early life and education ==
Mihail-Eugeniu Popescu was born on April 1, 1948, in the village of Cârlogani in Olt County. He graduated from the Dimitrie Cantemir Military High School in Breaza (1966) and the Higher Military School for Active Officers of Artillery and Missiles in Sibiu (1969). He also graduated in 1973 from the Military Academy in Bucharest. He later attended the Post-Academic Higher General Staff Course (1984), the National Defense College (1993), the Intensive English Language Course (1997), the NATO Defense College in Rome (1997). He obtained the scientific title of Doctor of Military Sciences in 1995.

== Military career ==
=== Early career ===
After graduating from the Officers' School, he served as an artillery officer in the Army of the Socialist Republic of Romania, fulfilling command positions such as: platoon commander at the 17th Artillery Brigade and at the Artillery Training Center (1969–1971), howitzer-gun division commander and deputy commander of the 8th Artillery Brigade (1973–1981), commander of the 315th Artillery Regiment from Șimleul Silvaniei (1981–1982), deputy commander and chief of artillery of the 81st Mechanized Division (1982–1984), deputy commander and chief of artillery of the 4th Army, with the garrison in Cluj (1984–1992), inspector general of artillery at the General Staff Inspectorate (1993–1997).

=== General officer ===
In 1997, Popescu was appointed as the head of the Doctrine and Instruction Directorate of the General Staff. On 1 December 1997, he was promoted to the rank of division general, being appointed, by order of the Minister of Defense, as the Chief of the Land Forces Staff (1997–2000). During this period, he was promoted to the rank of army corps general effective December 1, 1999.

=== Chief of the General Staff ===
On October 31, 2000, Popescu was promoted to the rank of Army General and appointed Chief of the Romanian General Staff. During his tenure as Chief of the General Staff, on 21 November 2002, on the occasion of the 2002 Prague NATO summit, Secretary General of NATO George Robertson, announced the invitation of Romania and six other states to join the Alliance. The NATO accession protocols of the seven states invited to the summit were signed at the Extraordinary Meeting of the North Atlantic Council on 26 March 2003.

In 2004, Popescu became a member of the NATO Military Committee. On 2 April 2004, together with the Minister of National Defence, Ioan Mircea Pașcu, he inaugurated the videoconference system through which the leadership of the ministry can systematically communicate with the Romanian military detachments on mission in the theatres of operations in Iraq, Afghanistan and the Balkans.

Then, on April 15, 2004, Popescu participated in the ceremony organized on the occasion of the admission of the new seven states to thealliance in the Belgian city of Mons.

On October 25, 2004, Popescu was relieved of his position and placed in reserve.

== Personal life ==
Popescu was married. Along with Eugen Bădălan, former PDL parliamentarian, Popescu was found guilty of corruption by the High Court of Cassation and Justice in the "Anvelopa" case, for the benefit of the Tofan Grup company. The two were sentenced to four years in prison, but with the execution of the sentence suspended. The National Anticorruption Directorate (DNA) had accused Bădălan and Popescu of damaging the state with 1.2 million euros when they led the General Staff of the Land Forces. The two were sent to trial in December 2007. In his later years, Popescu withdrew from public life.

He died on 20 June 2013 at his vacation home in Vatra Dornei.
