= Ștefan Dănilă =

Romanian Air Force Officer

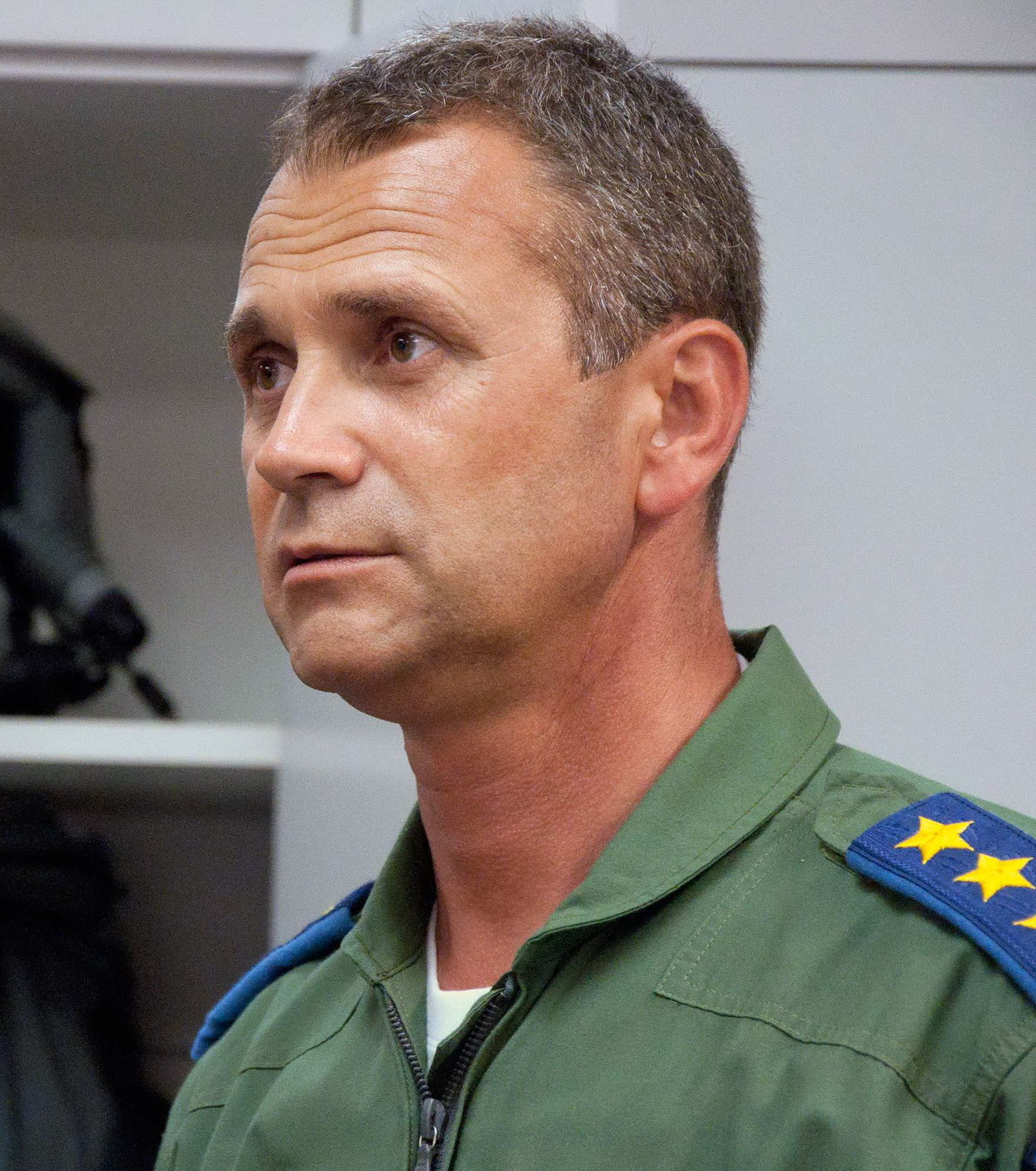
Dănilă in 2017.

Ștefan Dănilă (born May 14, 1965, in Târgu Neamț) is a Romanian Air Force general who served as Chief of the Romanian General Staff from January 1, 2011, to January 1, 2015, being the first general from the aviation branch to hold this position.

== Early life, education and training ==
Stefan Dănilă was born in the city of Târgu Neamț, Western Moldavia and attended the General School No. 1 in his hometown. He served in the Deveselu, Bacău and Bucharest garrisons. After graduating from the Ștefan cel Mare Military High School in Câmpulung Moldovenesc in 1983, he attended the Aurel Vlaicu Military School of Aviation Officers in Boboc, which he graduated in 1987 with the rank of lieutenant and a military pilot's license. Between 1998 and 2000 he attended the courses of the Inter-Arms Faculty within the Academy of Higher Military Studies. In 2009, he obtained the academic title of "Doctor of Military Sciences" at Carol I National Defence University, with the thesis "Air Security in the Context of Globalization".

== Career in the Air Force ==
After graduating from the military officer school, he was assigned as a MiG-21 pilot to the fighter aviation regiment deployed at Deveselu Military Base.

In 1990 he was transferred as a fighter pilot to the Supersonic Aircraft Transition Center in Bacău, commanded by Colonel Vladimir Buzdugan. In 1997 he switched to the MiG-21 LanceR, the modernized version of the MiG-21. After a two-year break, between 1998 and 2000, during which he attended the Academy of Higher Military Studies, he returned to Bacău, successively fulfilling the following functions: office chief, squadron commander and aviation group commander (acting).

After graduating from the Postgraduate Course in Advanced Training in Leading Large Operational Units in the Air Force in 2005, he was transferred to the Air Force Headquarters in Bucharest as Head of Section in the Training Service. In this position, he coordinated the development of specific instructions and regulations for flight training, led national and international exercises and was part of the coordination group for the anniversary air show ROIAS-2006. In April 2008, he was appointed commander of the RoAF 95th Air Base. In this capacity, he received the battle flag of the large aviation unit from the Chief of the Air Force Staff, General Constantin Croitoru. On 25 October 2009, he was promoted to the rank of Air Flotilla General.

== Chief of the General Staff ==
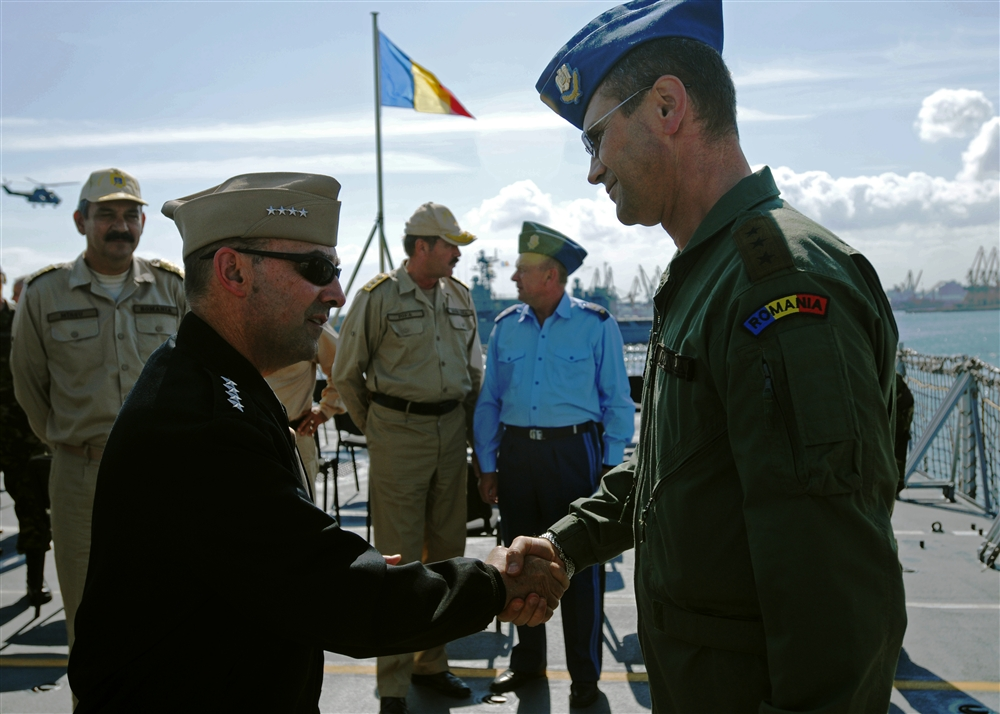
With Admiral James G. Stavridis, Supreme Allied Commander Europe.

On 1 October 2010, Dănilă was transferred to the General Staff, being appointed as Deputy Chief of the General Staff, to Admiral Gheorghe Marin. The appointment to this position made him eligible for the position of Chief of the General Staff, according to the provisions of Law no. 346 of 21 July 2006, which stipulated that "the position of Chief of the General Staff may be appointed by his deputy or one of the heads of the categories of forces of the Army". On 1 December 2010, he was promoted to the rank of Major General.

Following Admiral Marin's retirement, Major General Dănilă was appointed Chief of the General Staff, effective January 1, 2011. The ceremony of handing over the Battle Flag of the General Staff and the leadership of the Romanian Army took place at the headquarters of the Ministry of National Defense on December 27, 2010. On the occasion of "Air Force Day", on 20 July 2013, he was promoted to the rank of lieutenant general. On 1 December 2014, he was promoted to the rank of general, and on 1 January 2015, General Dănilă handed over the leadership of the General Staff to General Nicolae Ciucă.

== Post-military ==
After handing over the position of Chief of the General Staff, on 5 January 2015, he was appointed State Counselor and Head of the Defense Department at the Chancellery of the Prime Minister of Romania, and from March 2016 to 26 June 2017 he was the military advisor to the Minister of National Defense.

== Awards and recognitions ==
- Order of the Star of Romania
- Order of Aeronautical Virtue
- Honorary Badge "In the Service of the Army" for 15, 20 and 25 years
- Emblem of Honor of the Romanian Army
- Emblem of Honor of the General Staff
- French Legion of Honor
- Medal " Consolidation of the Brotherhood of Arms" (Moldova)
