= Sorin Frunzăverde =

Romanian politician (1960–2019)

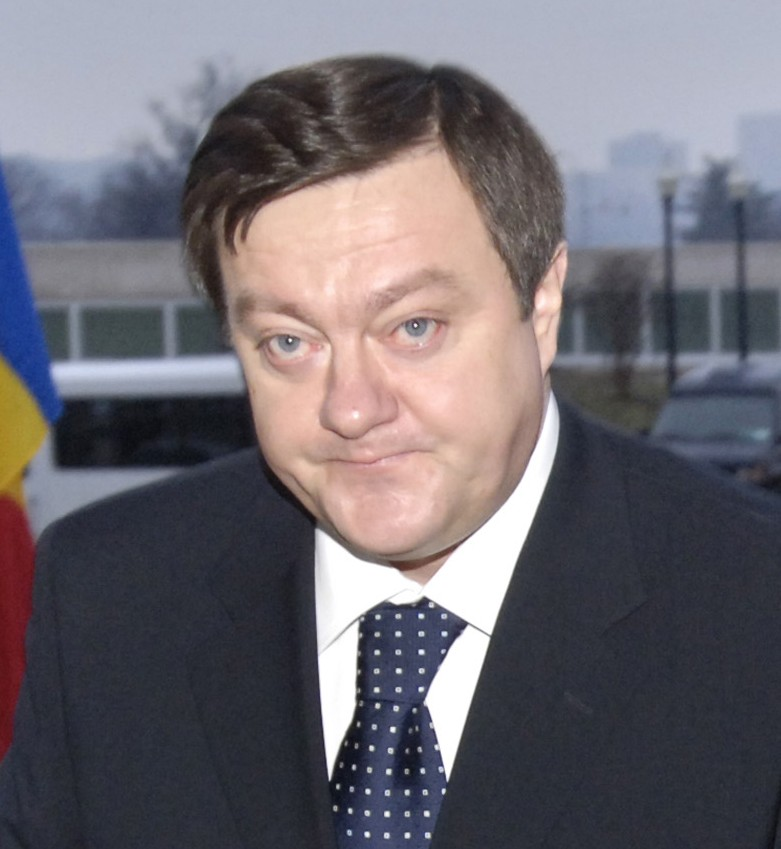
- Sorin Frunzăverde in February 2007

Member of the European Parliament
- In office 2007–2009

Minister of National Defense
- In office 25 October 2006 – 5 April 2007
- Prime Minister: Călin Popescu-Tăriceanu
- Preceded by: Corneliu Dobrițoiu (acting)
- Succeeded by: Teodor Meleșcanu
- In office 13 March 2000 – 28 December 2000
- Prime Minister: Mugur Isărescu
- Preceded by: Constantin Dudu Ionescu
- Succeeded by: Ioan Mircea Pașcu

Minister of Tourism
- In office 17 April 1998 – 16 December 1998
- Prime Minister: Radu Vasile
- Preceded by: Ákos Birtalan
- Succeeded by: Office abolished

Ministry of Water, Forestry and Environmental Protection
- In office 5 December 1997 – 11 February 1998
- Prime Minister: Victor Ciorbea
- Preceded by: Ioan Oltean
- Succeeded by: Romica Tomescu

Personal details
- Born: 26 April 1960 Bocșa, Caraș-Severin County, Romania
- Died: 3 November 2019 (aged 59) Reșița, Caraș-Severin County, Romania
- Party: PNL (2012–2019)
- Other political affiliations: PDL (1993–2012)
- Profession: Engineer

Sorin Frunzăverde (26 April 1960 – 3 November 2019) was a Romanian politician. He served as the Minister of National Defense of Romania on two occasions as well as the Minister of Tourism and Ministry of Water, Forestry and Environmental Protection. He was also the President of the Caraș-Severin County Council a member of the Parliament of Romania and a Member of the European Parliament from 2007 to 2009. Formerly a member of the Democratic Liberal Party (PDL), he joined the National Liberal Party (PNL) in 2012.

In 2015, he was charged with influence peddling by the National Anticorruption Directorate and convicted the following year. He received a two-year suspended sentence.

== Biography ==
=== Early life and career ===
He was born on 26 April 1960 in Bocșa, Caraș-Severin County, Romania and educated in Reșița. He graduated from metallurgical faculty of the Politehnica University of Bucharest with a degree in metallurgical engineering. He joined the Reșița Ironworks as an engineer and later became the president of the Chamber of Commerce and Industry for Caraș-Severin County.

=== Political career ===
In 1992, he won election to the county council of Caraș-Severin County, becoming president of that body in 1996.

In December 1997, he was appointed as Ministry of Water, Forestry and Environmental Protection in the cabinet of Victor Ciorbea. After Radu Vasile became prime minister in 1998, Frunzăverde moved to the position of Minister of Tourism.

He twice served as Minister of National Defense. The first appointment, from 13 March 2000 to 28 December 2000, came in the First cabinet of Mugur Isărescu when President Emil Constantinescu chose him to replace defence minister Victor Babiuc, who had left the Democratic Party but refused to leave the ministerial post. He returned to the post from 25 October 2006 to 5 April 2007, in the first cabinet of Călin Popescu-Tăriceanu after defence minister Teodor Atanasiu resigned following a long running dispute with President Traian Băsescu.

As a member of the Democratic Party, he was an advocate for changing the party's ideology from social democracy to social conservatism and for ending the cooperation with the Party of European Socialists, in favour of the European People's Party.

He was a Member of the European Parliament, where he was the Head of the Romanian delegation to the EPP, vice-chairman of the Subcommittee on Security and Defence, member of the Committee on Foreign Affairs. Within the European Parliament, he was involved in the EU-Western Balkans dialogue, acting as a member in the Delegation for relations with the countries of south-east Europe and the Delegation to the EU-Former Yugoslav Republic of Macedonia Joint Parliamentary Committee. He pushed for his party to join the European People’s Party group after having been affiliated with the Socialist International.

== Personal life ==
Frunzăverde was fluent in English, Italian, and German, and was married with one child. He died from kidney disease on 3 November 2019 at the age of 59.

Political offices
Preceded by Ioan Oltean	Ministry of Water, Forestry and Environmental Protection; 5 December 1997 – 11 February 1998	Succeeded by Romica Tomescu
Preceded by Ákos Birtalan	Minister of Tourism; 17 April 1998 – 16 December 1998	Succeeded by Office abolished
Preceded by Constantin Dudu Ionescu	Minister of National Defense; 13 March 2000 – 28 December 2000	Succeeded by Ioan Mircea Pașcu
Preceded by Corneliu Dobrițoiu (acting)	Minister of National Defense; 25 October 2006 – 5 April 2007	Succeeded by Teodor Meleșcanu
