= International Association for Military Pedagogy =

Military education organization

- Abbreviation: IAMP
- Formation: 2005; successor to the European Military Pedagogy Forum (EMPF).
- Type: International Society
- Legal status: active
- Purpose: independent network of professionals whose studies focus on education and training in the military setting.
- Region served: International
- Members: Baltic Defence College; Royal Danish Defence College; Finnish National Defence University; University of the Bundeswehr Munich; Carol I National Defence University; Finnish National Defence University; Netherlands Defence Academy; Swedish National Defence College; Military Academy at ETH Zurich; Educational and Training Services Branch of the British Army; Joint Services Command and Staff College
- Website: www.militarypedagogy.org

The International Association for Military Pedagogy (IAMP) was founded in November 2005 in Strausberg (Germany) as a successor to the European Military Pedagogy Forum (EMPF).

The IAMP is an independent network of professionals whose studies focus on education and training in the military setting. Its goals include the spreading of information that would assist professional military institutions of advanced learning (e.g. military academies and staff colleges). The purpose of IAMP activities is to encourage discussion and development in the theory of military pedagogy. Academics concerned with such subjects in civilian institutions of higher learning can participate in the Association.

The Association accomplishes its goals by promoting research, publication, and information sharing among its membership. The IAMP establishes contacts among military institutions of higher learning, as well as among national and international agencies. Annual conferences are hosted by member institutions.

Membership is open to individuals with a professional interest in military pedagogy.

== Members ==
Members include military and civilian professionals from military institutions of advanced learning such as:

- Austria: National Defence Academy
- Baltic states: Baltic Defence College
- Croatia: Croatian Defense Academy
- Denmark: Royal Danish Defence College
- Finland: National Defence University
- Germany: University of the Bundeswehr Munich
- Israel: Command & General Staff College, Tactical Command College
- Norway: Norwegian Defence University College
- Romania: Carol I National Defence University
- Sweden: Swedish National Defence College
- Switzerland: Armed Forces College (Military Academy at ETH Zurich)
- United Kingdom: Educational and Training Services Branch (British Army), Joint Services Command and Staff College

== Publications (selection) ==
- Annen, Hubert & Royl, W. (Eds.). (2007). Military Pedagogy in Progress. Studies for Military Pedagogy, Military Science & Security Policy, Vol. 10. Frankfurt a.M.; Berlin; Bern; Bruxelles; New York; Oxford; Wien: Peter Lang. ISBN 978-3-631-56072-3
- Florian, Heinz (Ed.). (2002). Military Pedagogy: An International Survey. Studies for Military Pedagogy, Military Science & Security Policy, Vol. 8. Frankfurt a.M.; Berlin; Bern; Bruxelles; New York; Oxford; Wien: Peter Lang. ISBN 3-631-39568-X
- Mardar, S. & Malos, G. (Eds.). (2007). Educating and Training Officers for Interoperability. The 7th International Conference on Military Pedagogy. Bucharest: "Carol I" National Defence University Publishing House. ISBN 978-973-663-574-8
- Micewski, E. & Annen, H. (Eds.). (2005). Military Ethics in Professional Military Education - Revisited. Studies for Military Pedagogy, Military Science & Security Policy, Vol. 9. Frankfurt a.M.; Berlin; Bern; Bruxelles; New York; Oxford; Wien: Peter Lang. ISBN 3-631-52864-7
- Toiskallio, J. (Ed.). (2007). Ethical Education in the Military. What, How and Why in the 21st Century? Helsinki: ACIE Publications. National Defence University. Department of Education. Series 1, N:o 1. ISBN 9789512517664
- Kozina, A. (2015) "The Hidden Curriculum in Military Schools" Security and Defence. No 1, (6); Warshaw, ISSN 2300-8741

== See also ==
- Military Education and Training
- Military Science
- Pedagogy
