= Nicolae Samsonovici =

Romanian general

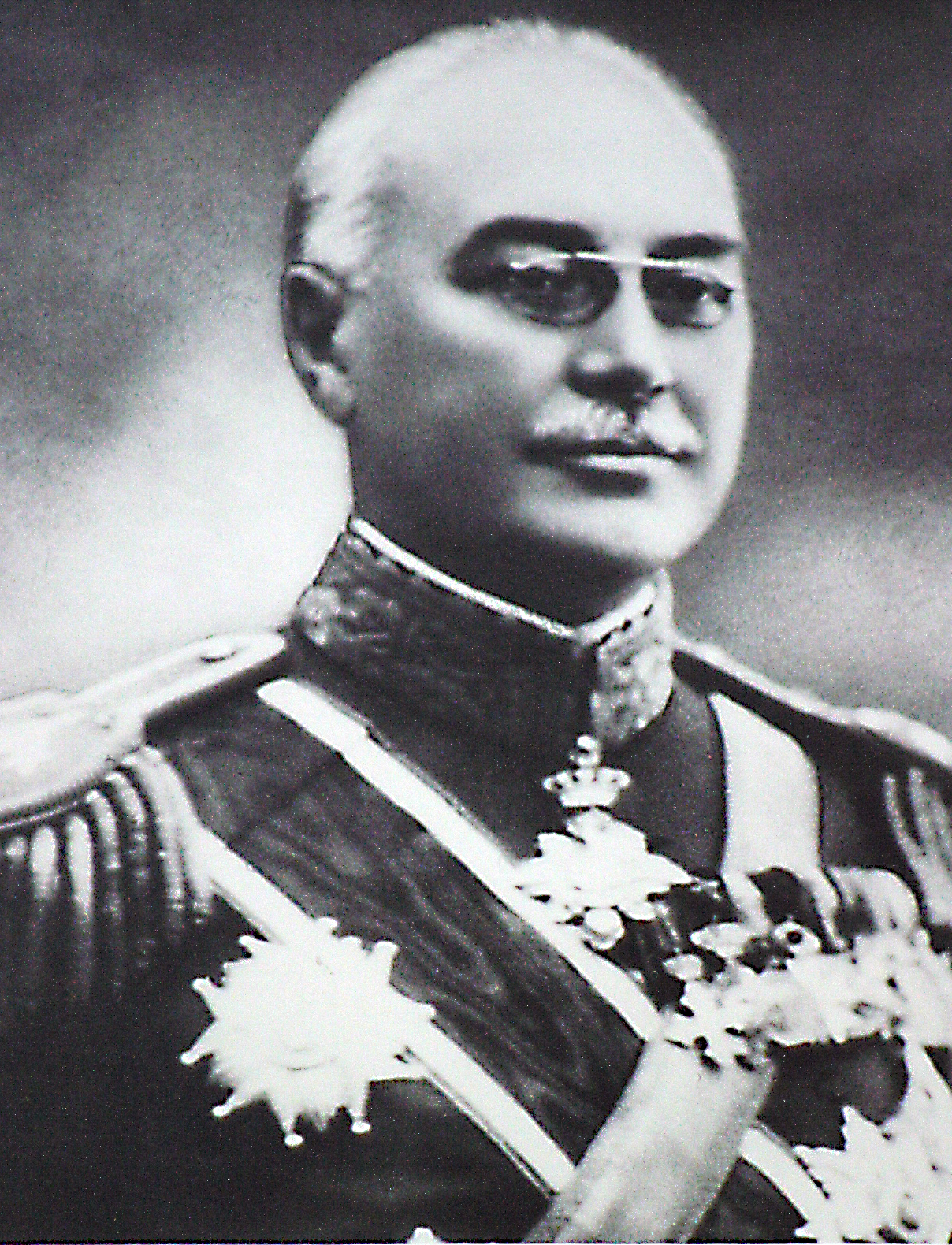
- Born: 7 August 1877; Dorohoi, Kingdom of Romania
- Died: 16 September 1950 (aged 73); Sighet Prison, Romanian People's Republic
- Burial place: Paupers Cemetery, Sighetu Marmației, Maramureș County
- Alma mater: Higher War School
- Military career
- Allegiance: Kingdom of Romania
- Branch: Romanian Army
- Service years: 1897–1937
- Rank: Lieutenant general
- Commands: 77th Infantry Regiment; 19th Infantry Division
- Conflicts: Second Balkan War; World War I; Battle of Transylvania; Battle of Mărășești
- Awards: Order of the Star of Romania, commander; Order of Saint Vladimir, 4th class; Order of Saint Stanislaus, 2nd class; Order of St Michael and St George, knight commander; Order of Michael the Brave, 3rd Class; Legion of Honour, officer; Order of the Crown, commander; Croix de guerre 1914–1918; Victory Medal; Order of the White Lion, commander; Order of Polonia Restituta, second class; Order of the White Eagle

Chief of the Romanian General Staff
- In office 21 June 1927 – 11 August 1932
- Monarchs: Ferdinand I Michael I Carol II
- Prime Minister: Ion I. C. Brătianu; Vintilă Brătianu; Iuliu Maniu; Gheorghe Mironescu; Nicolae Iorga; Alexandru Vaida-Voevod
- Preceded by: Alexandru Lupescu
- Succeeded by: Constantin Lăzărescu

52nd Minister of War of Kingdom of Romania
- In office 11 August 1932 – 14 November 1933
- Prime Minister: Alexandru Vaida-Voevod; Iuliu Maniu
- Preceded by: Constantin Ștefănescu Amza
- Succeeded by: Nicolae Uică

Nicolae Samsonovici (August 7, 1877–September 16, 1950) was a Romanian general. He attended officer training school in Bucharest from 1897 and afterwards joined an infantry regiment in a Romanian Army regiment. Samsonovici commanded a battalion during the Second Balkan War and during the First World War served was chief of staff of, successively, a division, corps and army. He ended the war in command of the 77th Infantry Regiment. Samsonovici was promoted to general rank in 1919 and served on the army staff; in the 1930s, he served as Chief of the General Staff and as Defense Minister. He resigned from active duty in 1937 upon which he was promoted to the rank of army corps general. Samsonovici was arrested by the communist regime in 1950 and died in prison.

== Origins through World War I ==
Born in Dorohoi to Costache and Agripina Samsonovici, he graduated from the soldiers’ sons’ school in Iași in 1895 and from the Bucharest officers’ school in 1897. He was then assigned as an infantry second lieutenant to a Roman regiment. Samsonovici steadily rose through the ranks: lieutenant (1900), captain (1907) and major (1913). From 1910 to 1912, he attended the Higher War School, graduating first in his class. From June to August 1913, he commanded a battalion in the Second Balkan War. His next assignments were with the general staff and with a Bacău regiment.

In August 1916, upon Romania’s entry into World War I, Samsonovici was advanced to lieutenant colonel and made chief of staff of the 7th Infantry Division. As such, he coordinated offensive and defensive moves around Ghimeș, Brețcu, Târgu Secuiesc, Miercurea Ciuc, Vlăhița and Odorheiu Secuiesc. He was also active on the Trotuș and Uz valleys; after two weeks of heavy fighting, the Austro-Hungarian Army was prevented from taking Comănești, Dărmănești and Bacău, withdrawing into a defensive posture. Finally, he was active along the Cricovul Sărat line. For his merits, Samsonovici was made a colonel in April 1917. As Chief of Staff of the 6th Army Corps and then of the First Army, he played an important role in the Battle of Mărășești, drawing praise from commanders Eremia Grigorescu and Constantin Prezan. In October 1918 he took command of the 77th Infantry Regiment.

== Postwar, recognition and aftermath ==
In March 1919, after the end of the war, Samsonovici was made a brigadier general, assigned to the general staff. From 1921 to 1926, he headed the Higher War School, where he was professor of tactics, strategy and military history. In the 1920s, he published several books related to the activity of general staffs, tactics, decisions, offensive and defensive principles. From 1926 to 1927, he commanded the 19th Infantry Division at Turnu Severin. From 1927 to 1928, he was deputy chief of the general staff. During this time, he advanced to division general.

Samsonovici was twice Chief of the Romanian General Staff: November 1928-August 1932, and December 1934-February 1937. From August 1932 to November 1933, he served as Defense Minister under Iuliu Maniu and Alexandru Vaida-Voevod. During his time at the forefront of the army, he focused on improving its structure, equipment and training; and on developing ties with allied armies, particularly those of Poland, Czechoslovakia, Yugoslavia, Greece, Turkey, France, and Great Britain. He was especially noted for his Polonophile views. He signed numerous military agreements with other members of the Little Entente and the Balkan Entente, amidst an increasingly tense situation in Europe. He was part of the Romanian delegation to the World Disarmament Conference of 1932-1934. Around 1936, he had an affair with Florica Titulescu, a high society lady related to Nicolae Titulescu who passed military secrets to French intelligence.

In February 1937, Samsonovici resigned from active duty, and was advanced to army corps general in 1938. His awards included the Order of the Star of Romania, officer (1917) and commander; Order of Saint Vladimir, fourth class (1917); Order of Saint Stanislaus, second class (1918); Order of St Michael and St George, knight commander (1918); Order of Michael the Brave, third class (1919); Legion of Honour, officer (1920); Order of the Crown, commander (1920); Croix de guerre 1914–1918 (1920); Victory Medal (1923). He was also made a commander of the Order of the White Lion, and granted the Order of Polonia Restituta, second class, as well as the Order of the White Eagle.

Arrested in May 1950 by the early communist regime, Samsonovici died several months later at Sighet Prison. He was buried at the Paupers Cemetery in Sighetu Marmației, in a common grave on the banks of the Tisza River. His widow Margareta and their daughter Lucia were both arrested in April 1952, spending two years in prison. A younger daughter, ill and blind, was left alone. Margareta and Lucia later emigrated to Belgium.
