= Grigore Gărdescu =

Romanian officer and politician

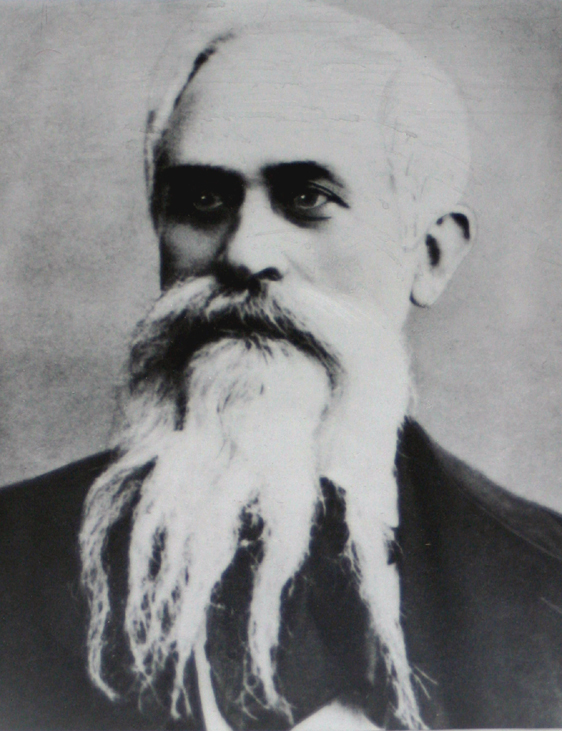
Official portrait.

Grigore Gărdescu was a Romanian military officer He was the Chief of the Romanian General Staff from January 8, 1860 to January 29, 1860, with the rank of colonel. In this position, he served as the first professional head of the Romanian Army. After the Union of the Principalities of Moldavia and Wallachia in 1859, the Domnitor Alexandru Ioan Cuza decided to set up a General Staff of the Unified military forces, which was at that time subordinated to the two ministries of war belonging to the two states. Gărdescu served for 21 days before being replaced by Major Istratie Sămășescu.
