= Gheorghiță Vlad =

Romanian general

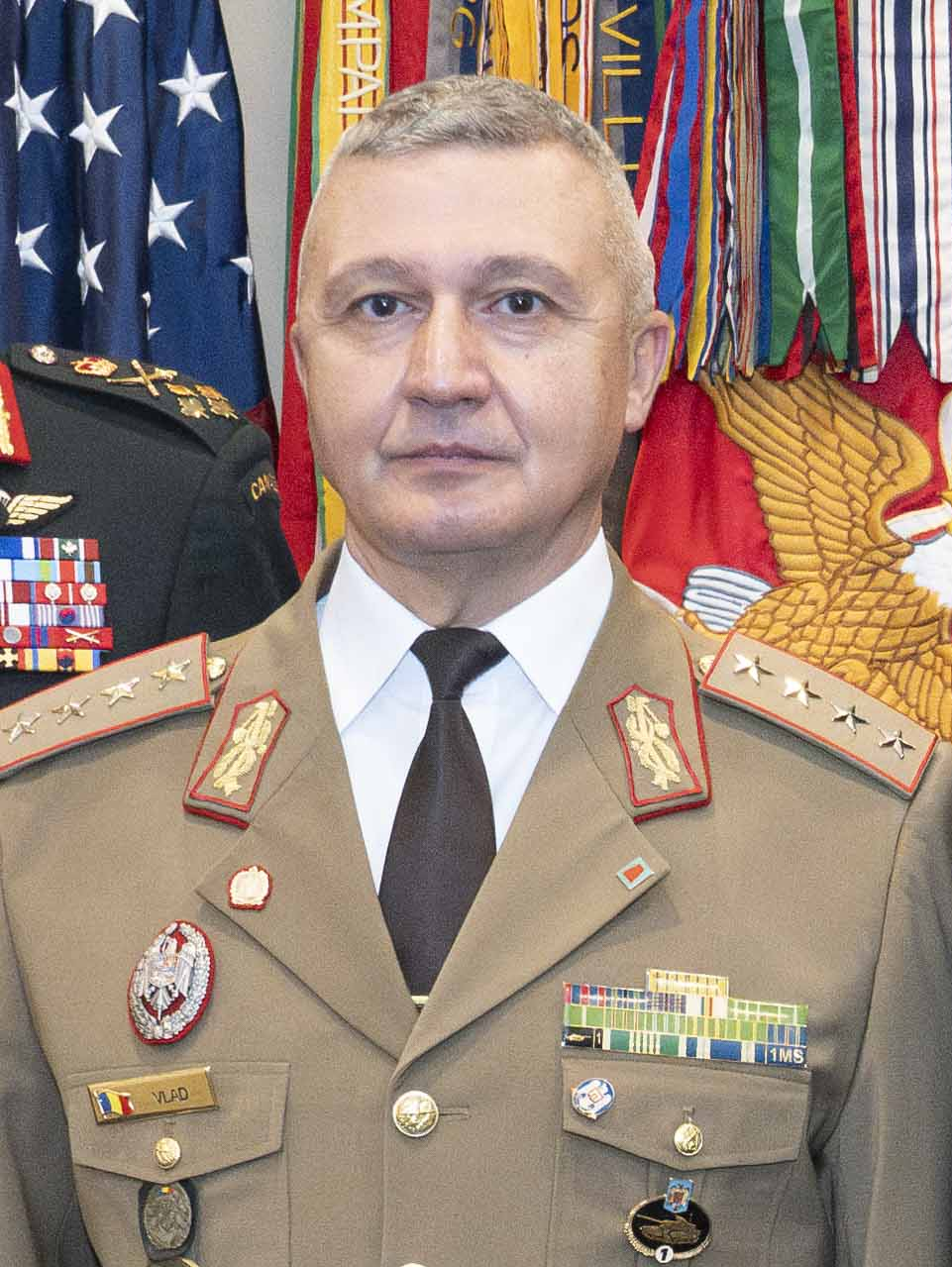
Vlad at the NATO Chief's of Defense meeting during the 2024 NATO Summit in Washington, D.C., July 9, 2024.

Gheorghiță Vlad (born 7 September 1969) is a Romanian general in the Romanian Land Forces. Since 30 November 2023, he has been Chief of the Romanian General Staff and thus the highest-ranking officer in the Romanian Armed Forces.

== Life and career ==
Vlad was born in 1969 in Bucharest, the capital of Romania. He graduated from the Dimitrie Cantemir Military High School in 1988 and completed the Military School for Active Tank Officers in 1991. In addition to basic officer training, Vlad attended the Joint Command and Staff College at the Carol I National Defence University. Further training included a postgraduate program in security and good governance at the National Defense College and the Peacekeeping Operations course at NATO School Oberammergau in southern Germany. He earned a master's degree in International Relations and Security Studies from Lucian Blaga University of Sibiu and a master's degree in Strategic Studies from the United States Army War College in Carlisle, Pennsylvania. He also completed the Joint Multinational Operations advanced training course at the National Defense University.

His officer career began in July 1991 as a tank platoon commander. In 1994, he took command of a tank company in the 22nd Tank Regiment in Bucharest. In the following years, he commanded, among others, the 631st Tank Battalion (under the 15th Mechanized Brigade), the 1st Mechanized Brigade "Argedava", and the Cincu Training Center. Later, he commanded the 2nd Infantry Division. At the operational level, he served as Chief of Operations Planning and Chief of Intelligence for the Land Forces, among other roles. In 2007, he was deployed overseas as part of Operation Iraqi Freedom.

At the strategic level, Vlad served as Deputy Chief of the General Staff for Operations and Training from 2020 to 2022. He was subsequently appointed Deputy Chief of the General Staff before assuming the post of Chief of the General Staff on November 30, 2023.

In June 2026, a criminal investigation against Vlad was opened on suspicion that he abused his power to unlawfully secure state-funded college seats.

== Awards ==
- Knight of the Order of the Star of Romania
- Officer of the National Order of Merit
- Military Virtue Medal
- Order of Faithful Service
