= Rediu, Iași =

Rediu
- Commune
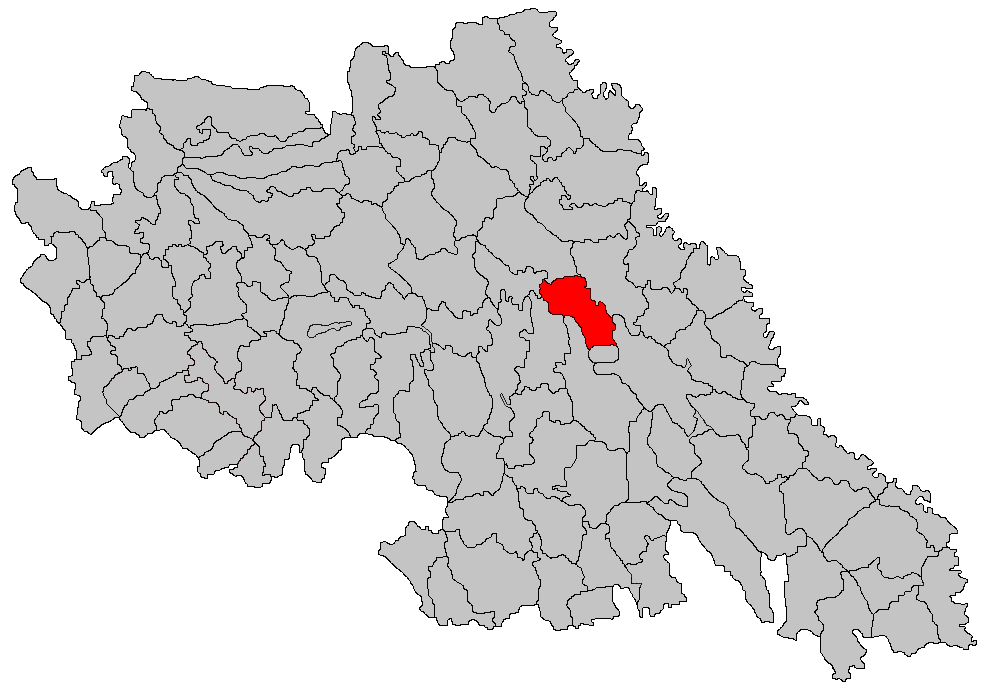
- Location in Iași County

- Location in Romania
- Coordinates: 47°13′N 27°31′E
- Country: Romania
- County: Iași
- Subdivisions: Rediu, Breazu, Horlești, Tăutești

Government
  - Mayor (2024–2028): Ioan-Cristinel Condrea (PNL)
- Area: 41.6 km^{2} (16.1 sq mi)
- Elevation: 83 m (272 ft)
- Population (2021-12-01): 8,295
  - Density: 200/km^{2} (520/sq mi)
- Time zone: EET/EEST (UTC+2/+3)
- Postal code: 707405
- Area code: +40 x32
- Vehicle reg.: IS
- Website: www.primariarediu.ro

Rediu is a commune in Iași County, Western Moldavia, Romania, part of the Iași metropolitan area. It is composed of four villages: Breazu, Horlești, Rediu, and Tăutești.

== Natives ==
- Mircea Chelaru (born 1949), general and politician
