= Ștefan Fălcoianu =

Romanian army general (1835–1905)

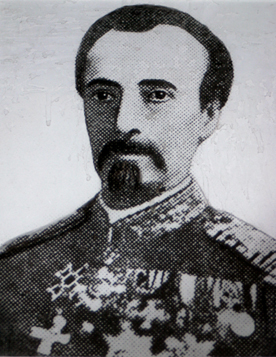

Minister of War of Kingdom of Romania
- In office 23 June 1884 – 12 January 1886
- Prime Minister: Ion C. Brătianu
- Preceded by: Ion C. Brătianu
- Succeeded by: Alexandru Anghelescu

Chief of the Romanian General Staff
- In office 20 October 1877 – 1878
- Prime Minister: Ion C. Brătianu
- Preceded by: Constantin Barozzi
- Succeeded by: Gheorghe Slăniceanu

Chief of the Romanian General Staff
- In office 15 April 1883 – 23 May 1884
- Prime Minister: Ion C. Brătianu
- Preceded by: Gheorghe Slăniceanu
- Succeeded by: Nicolae Dona

Chief of the Romanian General Staff
- In office 13 January 1886 – 18 June 1894
- Prime Minister: Ion Brătianu; Theodor Rosetti; Lascăr Catargiu; Gheorghe Manu; Ion Emanuel Florescu; Lascăr Catargiu
- Preceded by: Nicolae Dona
- Succeeded by: Iacob Lahovary

Personal details
- Born: June 6, 1835 Bucharest, Wallachia
- Died: January 22, 1905 (aged 69) Bucharest, Kingdom of Romania
- Resting place: Bellu Cemetery, Bucharest
- Education: École spéciale militaire de Saint-Cyr; École Polytechnique
- Awards: Order of Osmanieh; Benemerenti medal Order of the Star of Romania; Order of the Crown; Military Virtue Medal

Military service
- Branch/service: Romanian Land Forces
- Rank: divisional general
- Battles/wars: Romanian War of Independence

Ștefan Fălcoianu (June 6, 1835–January 22, 1905) was a Romanian army general who served as Chief of the General Staff and War Minister.

== Biography ==
=== Origins and early career ===
Fălcoianu family coat of arms

Born in Bucharest, he belonged to a boyar family originating in Romanați County. His father Ioniță was a serdar, while his mother was Ralița Lipoveanu. He had a twin brother, Ioan, who became a mathematician. Ștefan was born second, making him the last of eight children. After completing secondary school in his native city, he entered its military officers' school in 1854 and graduated two years later. His abilities during four years of training attracted notice, and, with the backing of domnitor Alexandru Ioan Cuza, he was sent to the École spéciale militaire de Saint-Cyr. An assistant to Achille Baraguey d'Hilliers, he remained with the French General Staff until 1864, when he returned home with the rank of captain. Meanwhile, from 1862 to 1864, he attended the École Polytechnique in Paris.

In 1865, he married the 16-year-old Alexandrina Bâscoveanu. Two of their four children died young; a daughter became lady-in-waiting to Queen Elisabeth, while a son was killed in action during World War I. Alexandrina died in 1870, aged 28; her widower hired Antoine-Augustin Préault to carve the gravestone at Bellu Cemetery. Within the Romanian Land Forces, Fălcoianu attained the following ranks: second lieutenant (1856), lieutenant (1860), captain (1862), major (1865), lieutenant-colonel (1868), colonel (1877), brigadier general (1883) and divisional general (1892). His first commanding role came from 1856 to 1859, when he led a platoon within a line infantry regiment.

After returning from France in 1864, he was named cabinet chief to War Minister Savel Manu. He taught at the military officers' school from 1864 to 1868. From 1866 to 1868, he was assistant to the chief of artillery emplacements and general staff chief of an infantry division. Sent to the reserves in early 1869, he was called back to active duty in a line regiment later that year. In 1872, he was again placed in reserve.

=== Civil servant and military leader ===
From 1870 to 1877, he was secretary general in the Ministry of Public Works, and headed the telegraph and post service from 1876 to 1877. In April 1877, during the preparations for the Romanian War of Independence, Fălcoianu was recalled to active duty, serving as director of the central war administration until October. From that point until the following July, he was Chief of the Romanian General Staff. He held this position twice more: from 1883 to 1884, and from 1886 to 1894, when he resigned from the army. He served as War Minister under Ion C. Brătianu from June 1884 to January 1886.

In October 1878, he was named Romania's representative to the commission charged by the Treaty of Berlin with dividing Dobruja between Romania and the Principality of Bulgaria. In 1880, he became the first director of Căile Ferate Române state railway carrier. He was involved in the company leadership until 1883, and again headed its administration from 1895 to 1899. During his time at the helm, Fălcoianu helped draft legislation on a unified structure for the rails and supervised the 1881 opening of the Buzău-Mărășești line. This was the first in the country built by domestic engineers, technicians and workers. In 1883, he was Senator for Tecuci. As such, he repeatedly spoke of the need to increase the country's defense capabilities, refuting the idea that the fortifications then under construction were useless.

While Fălcoianu was in the army leadership, numerous reforms took place: four army corps were established at Bucharest, Craiova, Galați, and Iași between 1882 and 1884; work began on the fortifications of Bucharest and along the fortified Focșani-Nămoloasa-Galați line; and several high-level administrative posts were created, as well as the inspectors-general. The general staff was reorganized along the modern, Prussian model, also taking into account lessons learned in the independence war. In 1894, it became a special division within the War Ministry, directly subordinate to the minister. The Higher War School opened in 1889, and Fălcoianu was its first commander. Under his orders, every summer between 1891 and 1894, officers from the school traveled to different sections of the border with Austria-Hungary in order to study their military potential.

=== Publications and recognition ===
He authored several books on military theory and history: Explicări generale (1880), Răspuns (1889), Conferință asupra disciplinei, subordinațiunii și îndatoririlor ierarhice (1890), Despre scrisori și raporturi (1892) and Istoria Războiului din 1877–1878 ruso-româno-turc (1895). In 1891, he was among those who relaunched România Militară magazine, and in subsequent years helped ensure its continued printing. He was elected a titular member of the Romanian Academy in 1876, the first military figure so honored. Over the years, he led various of its working committees, served as its vice president from 1886 to 1888 and from 1898 to 1899, and was several times vice president of the scientific section between 1882 and 1905.

Fălcoianu was awarded a number of orders and medals, including the Order of Osmanieh, third class (1878); the Benemerenti medal, first class; officer, Order of the Star of Romania (1878); grand officer, Order of the Crown; the gold Military Virtue Medal (1888); commander, Order of the Star of Romania (1888); grand cross, Order of the Crown (1891).

He died in Bucharest and was buried at Bellu Cemetery.
