= Ioan Mircea Pașcu =

Romanian politician, Minister of Defense from 2000 to 2004

Ioan Mircea Pașcu MEP
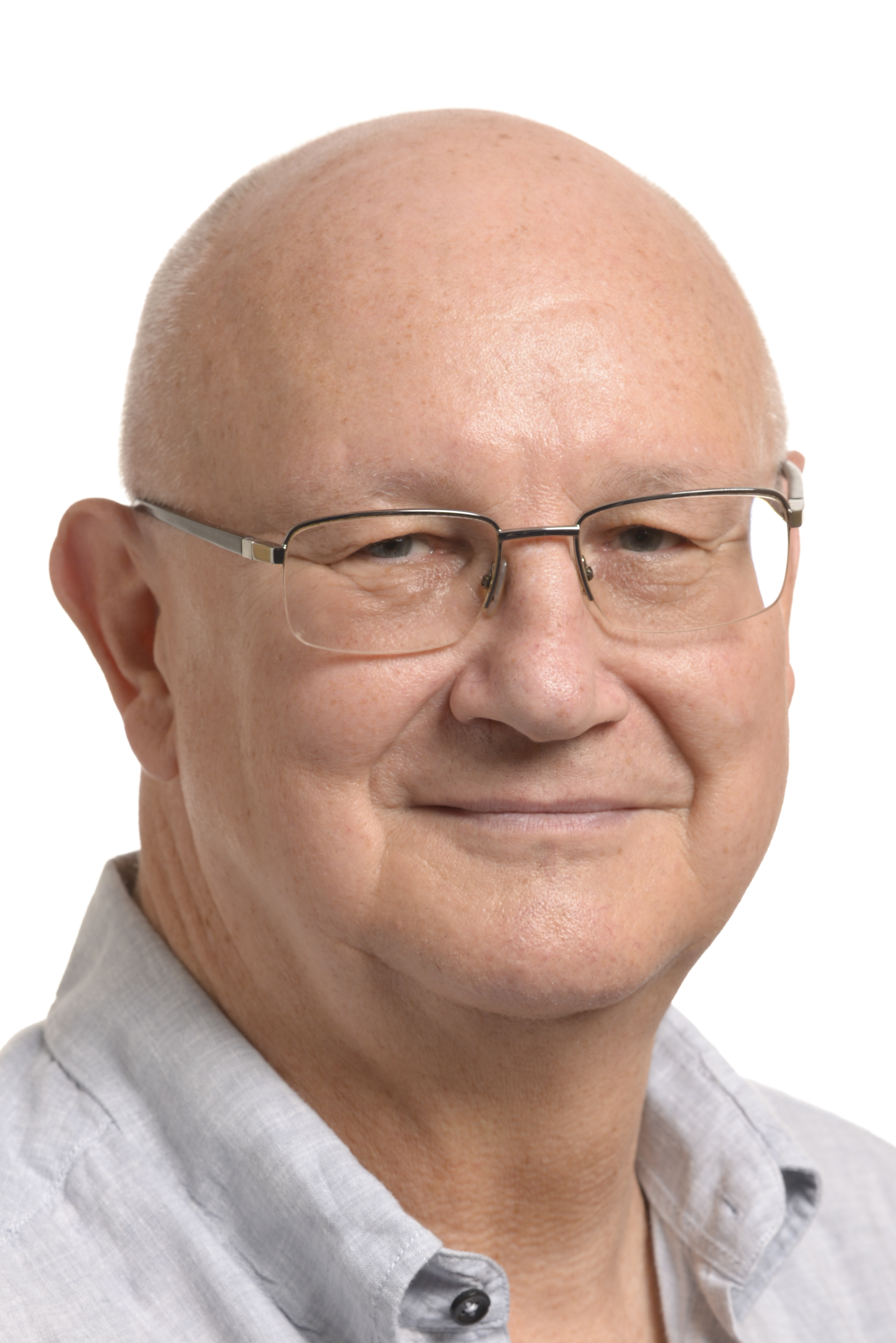

Minister of Defense
- In office 28 December 2000 – 28 December 2004
- Prime Minister: Adrian Năstase
- Preceded by: Sorin Frunzăverde
- Succeeded by: Teodor Atanasiu

Member of the European Parliament for Romania
- In office 1 January 2007 – 1 July 2019

Personal details
- Born: 17 February 1949 (age 77) Satu Mare, Satu Mare County, Romania
- Party: Social Democratic Party
- Other political affiliations: Progressive Alliance of Socialists and Democrats; Party of European Socialists
- Education: Bucharest Academy of Economic Studies; National University of Political Studies and Public Administration

Ioan Mircea Pașcu (born 17 February 1949) is a Romanian politician and Member of the European Parliament (MEP) from Romania. He previously served Minister of Defense from 2000 to 2004. He is a member of the Social Democratic Party (PDSR/PSD), part of the Party of European Socialists.

== Positions in the European Parliament ==
- Vice-chair of the Committee on Foreign Affairs
- Vice-chair of the delegation for relations with the NATO Parliamentary Assembly
- Member of the Subcommittee on Security and Defence
- Member of the delegation for relations with Japan
- Substitute member of the Committee on Transport and Tourism
- Substitute member of the delegation for relations with the United States

== Curriculum vitae ==
Academic career

- 1971 Diploma in Foreign Trade Faculty of Foreign Trade, Academy of Economic Studies Bucharest
- 1980, Doctorate in Political Sciences, Institute of Political Sciences Bucharest
- 1971−1986, Researcher, Department of International Relations Institute of Political Sciences, Department of International Relations Bucharest
- 1973, Researcher, Salzburg Seminar for American Studies
- 1979−1981, Fellow, Ford Foundation grant
- 1985, Invited Associate Professor, St. Catherine's College, Oxford
- 1986−1988, Lecturer in International Relations Academy of Political and Social Sciences Bucharest
- 1988−1989, Resident researcher Institute for East-West Security Studies New York
- 1992−1993, Grant, Japan Foundation, Centre for Slavic Studies, University of Hokkaido (Sapporo) and foreign researcher, Japanese Forum for International Relations
- 1990−1996, Dean of the Faculty of International Relations National School of Political Studies and Public Administration Bucharest
- 1990−present, Professor of International Relations National School of Political Studies and Public Administration Bucharest

Political career

- 31/12/1989−01/07/1990, Member of the Committee on Foreign Policy, Council of the National Salvation Front Council of the National Salvation Front
- 09/02/1990−15/05/1990, Member of the Provisional National Unity Council Provisional National Unity Council
- 01/07/1990–01/10/1992, Presidential counsellor, Head of the Foreign Policy Directorate, Department of Political Analysis, Romanian Presidential Administration
- 1990−1992, Vice-president of the National Salvation Front
- 1996−2000, Member of the Romanian Parliament for Maramures Chair of the Committee on Defence Chamber of Deputies, Romanian Parliament
- 22/03/1993 − 22/11/1996, State Secretary for Defence Policy and International Relations Ministry of National Defence
- 1997−2006, Vice-president of the Social Democratic Party
- 2000−2007, Member of the Romanian Parliament for Satu Mare Chamber of Deputies, Romanian Parliament
- 2000−2004, Minister of National Defence Ministry of National Defence
- 01/01/2007−01/07/2019, Member of the European Parliament

Political offices
Preceded by Sorin Frunzăverde	Minister of Defense; 2000–2004	Succeeded by Teodor Atanasiu
