= Gheorghe Marin =

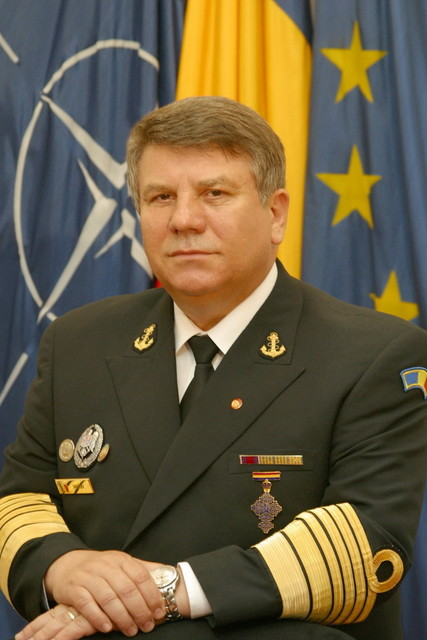
Official portrait.

Gheorghe Marin (born January 1, 1952) is a Romanian Naval Forces admiral, who served (until 2011) as Chief of the Romanian General Staff.

== Early life and professional career ==
Gheorghe Marin was born on January 1, 1952, in the village of Negru Vodă, Constanța and completed his pre-university training in civil society. During 1970–1974, he attended the Mircea cel Bătrân Naval Institute in Constanța, upon graduation of which he was appointed commander of the combat navigation and transmission service at the Missile-Carrying Star Division (1974–1978). During his student years, he was a college colleague for two years with Traian Băsescu, the future president of Romania.

After graduating from the Combined Arms Faculty of the Academy of Higher Military Studies (now Carol I National Defence University) in Bucharest (1978–1980), he returned to the same division as a ship commander (1980–1981). During the years 1981–1985, he worked as a staff officer in the Operations Section of the Naval Forces General Staff, then as head of the Design-Programming Workshop in the Naval Forces Computing Center (1985–1989).

In parallel, since 1982 he has been a student at the Faculty of Planning and Economic Cybernetics within the Bucharest Academy of Economic Studies, whose courses he graduated in 1987. Between 1989 and 1995, he held the position of Head of the Naval Forces Computing Center. In 1993, he obtained the scientific title of Doctor of Military Sciences, specialty leadership and automation of troop command. He was then, from 1995 to 1999, the commander of the Naval Forces Radioelectronic Research and Observation Brigade.

== Continued education ==
After graduating from the International Course on Defense Strategy and Economics organized at the George C. Marshall European Center for Security Studies in 1999, in the same year, Marin was appointed as Commander and Rector of the Mircea cel Bătrân Naval Academy, a position he held between 1999 and 2003. On October 25, 2000, he was promoted to the rank of Fleet Rear Admiral.

During this period, he continued his specialized postgraduate studies, graduating from the National Defense College (2000), as well as the Course for Generals and Admirals at the NATO Defense College in Rome (2003).

== High commands ==
On 24 October 2003, he was promoted to the rank of rear admiral and appointed as Director of the General Staff (2003–2004). On 1 April 2004, he was appointed to the position of Commander of the Navy, and on 29 November 2005, he was promoted to the rank of three-star vice admiral. On 13 September 2006, he was appointed Chief of the Romanian General Staff, the first naval officer to hold the position in its almost 150-year history. On 4 November that year, he was made a full admiral. Gheorghe Marin thus became the first active four-star admiral of the Romanian army. He served until 31 December 2010

== Awards ==
- Knight of the Order of the Star of Romania (2004)
- Order of Military Merit (3rd, 2nd and 1st class)
- Military Merit Medal (3rd, 2nd and 1st class)
- Order of Merit of the Italian Republic
- Honorary Emblem of the Romanian Army (on October 25, 2007).
