= Chief of the Romanian General Staff =

Professional head of the Romanian Armed Forces

Chief of General Defence Staff
- Șeful Statului Major General al Apărării
- Coat of arms of the Romanian General Staff

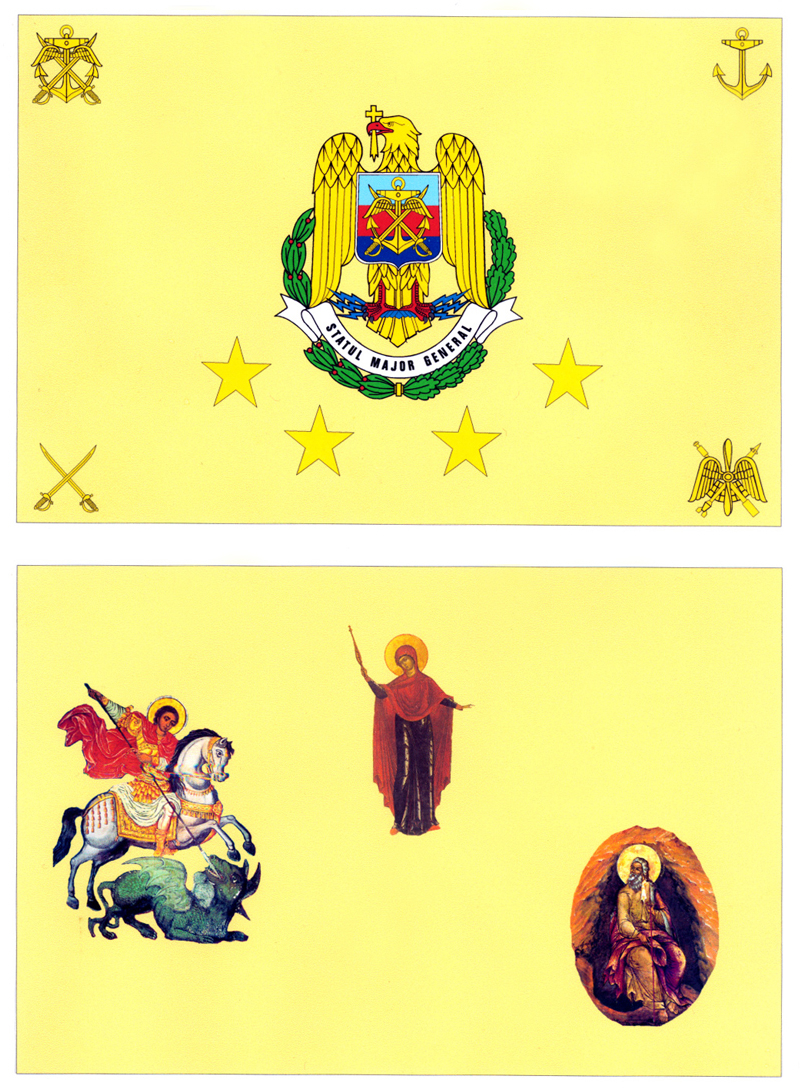
- Identification flag of the Romanian General Staff (obverse and reverse)

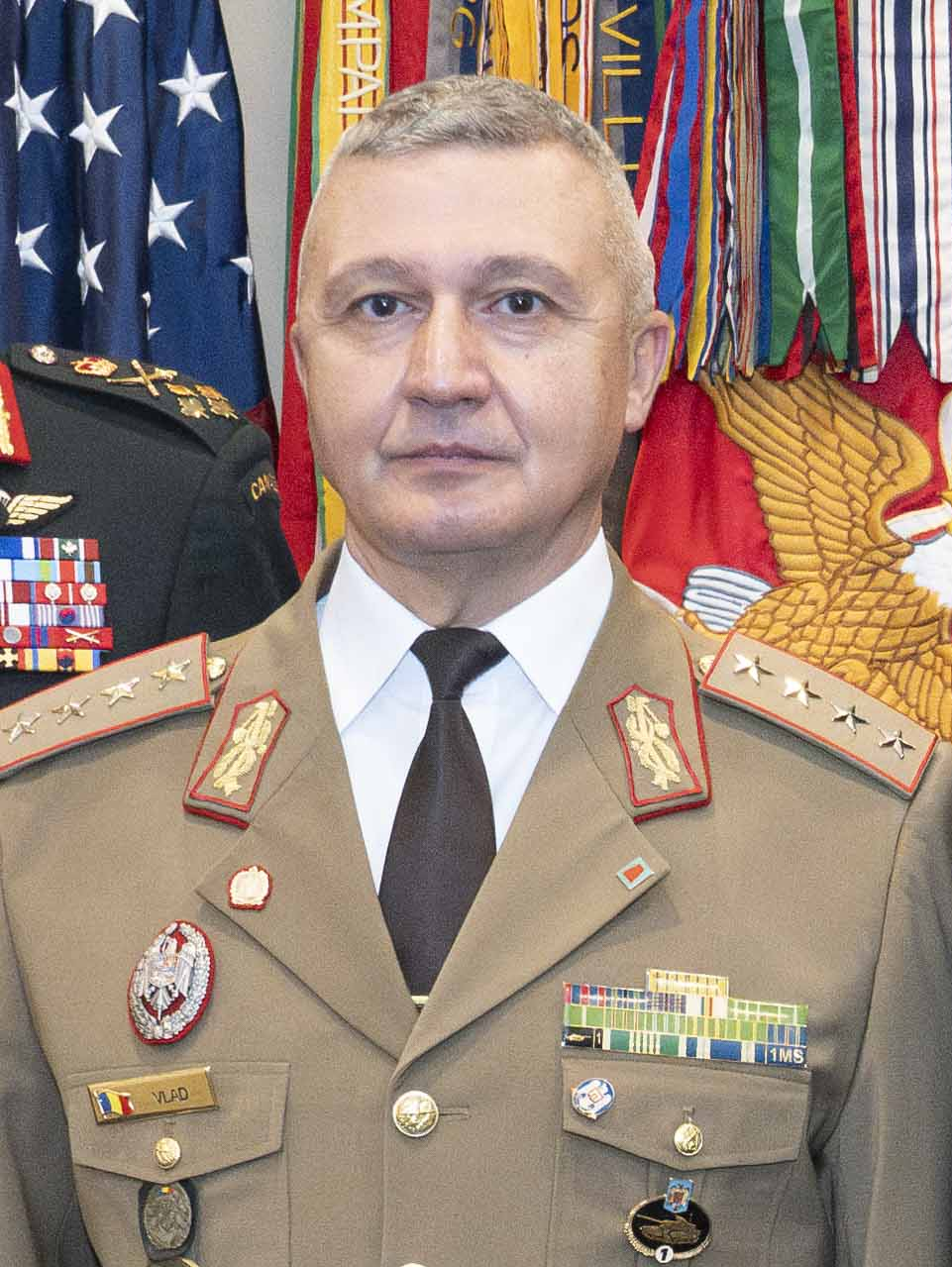
- Incumbent; General Gheorghiță Vlad since 30 November 2023
- General Staff of Defence
- Appointer: President of Romania
- Term length: 4 years, can be extended up to 5 years
- Constituting instrument: Law no. 346 from 21 July 2006 (art. 12)
- Formation: 12 November 1859
- First holder: Grigore Gărdescu
- Website: Official website

The Chief of General Staff of Defence (Romanian: Șeful Statului Major General al Apărării) is the highest professional military authority in the Romanian Armed Forces. He is appointed by the President of Romania, at the National Defense Minister's proposal (with the approval of the Prime Minister) on a four-year period, with the possibility of one-year extension. The Deputy Chief of General Staff or one of the Chiefs of the Services can be appointed in this position.

== Role of the General Staff ==
According to Law no. 346 from 21 July 2006 (art. 12), the General Staff provides for:

- Force command;
- Organization;
- Planning and making operational;
- Gradual increase of readiness levels;
- Mobilization;
- Conduct of joint operations;
- Troops' training;
- Basic and specialty training of the active-duty and reserve military personnel;
- Military personnel individual career management;
- Armaments planning;
- Standardization in the military field;
- Implementation of the C4ISR, logistic and infrastructure system;
- Conduct of the international military relations;
- Religious assistance in the MoND;
- Signing technical agreements with other states armed forces;
- Promotion of the military culture and civil education values.

The Joint Chiefs of Staff Committee is established at the level of the General Staff. The committee is a deliberative structure, having a consultative role. The Joint Chiefs of Staff Committee meets to discuss important topics with regard to the Romanian Armed Forces’ activity, usually quarterly or whenever necessary.

The Chief of General Staff is also the Chairman of the Joint Chiefs of Staff Committee.

The Gallery of the Chiefs of General Staff consists of 48 Flag and Commissioned Officers in the 1859–2006 timeframe.

== List of the Chiefs ==
=== United Principalities (1860–1881) ===
No.	Portrait	Chief of the General Staff	Took office	Left office	Time in office
1	Grigore Gărdescu	Colonel; Grigore Gărdescu	8 January 1860	29 January 1860	21 days
2	Istratie Sămășescu [ro]	Major; Istratie Sămășescu	29 January 1860	30 May 1860	122 days
3	Ioan Emanoil Florescu	General; Ioan Emanoil Florescu (1819–1893)	30 May 1860	30 August 1860	92 days
(3)	Ioan Emanoil Florescu	General; Ioan Emanoil Florescu (1819–1893)	21 April 1864	1 May 1866	2 years, 10 days
4	Gheorghe Slăniceanu [ro]	Colonel; Gheorghe Slăniceanu (1835–1885)	27 April 1877	18 August 1877	113 days
5	Constantin Barozzi [ro]	Colonel; Constantin Barozzi (1833–1921)	18 August 1877	20 October 1877	63 days
6	Ștefan Fălcoianu	General; Ștefan Fălcoianu (1835–1905)	20 October 1877	1878	0–1 years
(4)	Gheorghe Slăniceanu [ro]	Colonel; Gheorghe Slăniceanu (1835–1885)	1878	22 February 1879	0–1 years

=== Kingdom of Romania (1881–1947) ===
No.	Portrait	Chief of the General Staff	Took office	Left office	Time in office
7	Alexandru Cernat	General; Alexandru Cernat (1828–1893)	1881	1882	0–1 years
(4)	Gheorghe Slăniceanu [ro]	Colonel; Gheorghe Slăniceanu (1835–1885)	1882	15 April 1883	0–1 years
(6)	Ștefan Fălcoianu	General; Ștefan Fălcoianu (1835–1905)	15 April 1883	23 May 1884	1 year, 38 days
8	Nicolae Dona [ro]	Colonel; Nicolae Dona (1833–1916)	23 May 1884	13 January 1886	1 year, 235 days
(6)	Ștefan Fălcoianu	General; Ștefan Fălcoianu (1835–1905)	13 January 1886	18 June 1894	8 years, 156 days
9	Iacob Lahovary	General; Iacob Lahovary (1846–1907)	1 October 1894	1 October 1895	1 year
(5)	Constantin Barozzi [ro]	Colonel; Constantin Barozzi (1833–1921)	1 October 1895	1 October 1898	3 years
10	Constantin Poenaru	General; Constantin Poenaru (1842–1912)	1 October 1898	1 April 1901	2 years, 182 days
11	Alexandru Cărcăleteanu [ro]	General de brigadă Alexandru Cărcăleteanu (1843–1936)	1 April 1901	1 April 1904	3 years
12	Nicolae Tătărăscu [ro]	General de brigadă Nicolae Tătărăscu (1850–1916)	1 April 1904	1 April 1907	3 years
13	Grigore C. Crăiniceanu	General; Grigore C. Crăiniceanu (1852–1935)	1 April 1907	1 November 1909	2 years, 214 days
14	Ioan Istrati [ro]	General Adjutant; Ioan Istrati (1860–1942)	1 November 1909	31 March 1911	1 year, 150 days
15	Vasile Zottu [ro]	General de Divizie; Vasile Zottu (1853–1916)	31 March 1911	18 November 1911	232 days
16	Alexandru Averescu	General; Alexandru Averescu (1859–1938)	18 November 1911	2 December 1913	2 years, 14 days
17	Constantin Cristescu	General; Constantin Cristescu (1866–1923)	2 December 1913	1 April 1914	120 days
(15)	Vasile Zottu [ro]	General de Divizie; Vasile Zottu (1853–1916)	1 April 1914	25 October 1916	2 years, 207 days
–	Dumitru Iliescu [ro]	General de brigadă Dumitru Iliescu (1865–1940); Acting	25 October 1916	5 December 1916	41 days
18	Constantin Prezan	General de Divizie Adjutant; Constantin Prezan (1861–1943)	5 December 1916	1 April 1918	117 days
(17)	Constantin Cristescu	General; Constantin Cristescu (1866–1923)	1 April 1918	28 October 1918	210 days
(18)	Constantin Prezan	General de Divizie Adjutant; Constantin Prezan (1861–1943)	28 October 1918	20 March 1920	1 year, 144 days
(17)	Constantin Cristescu	General; Constantin Cristescu (1866–1923)	1 April 1920	8 May 1923	3 years, 37 days
–	Alexandru Gorsky [ro]	General de brigadă Alexandru Gorsky (1875–?); Acting	8 May 1923	1 October 1923	146 days
19	Alexandru Lupescu [ro]	General de Divizie; Alexandru Lupescu (1865–1934)	1 October 1923	21 June 1927	3 years, 263 days
20	Nicolae Samsonovici	General de Divizie; Nicolae Samsonovici (1877–1950)	21 June 1927	11 August 1932	5 years, 51 days
21	Constantin Lăzărescu [ro]	General de Divizie; Constantin Lăzărescu	11 August 1932	30 November 1933	1 year, 111 days
22	Ion Antonescu	General; Ion Antonescu (1882–1946)	1 December 1933	11 December 1934	1 year, 10 days
(20)	Nicolae Samsonovici	General de Divizie; Nicolae Samsonovici (1877–1950)	11 December 1934	1 February 1937	2 years, 52 days
–	Ion Sichitiu [ro]	General de Divizie; Ion Sichitiu (1878–1952); Acting	1 February 1937	1 November 1937	273 days
23	Ștefan Ionescu [ro]	General de Divizie; Ștefan Ionescu (1881–?)	1 November 1937	1 February 1939	1 year, 92 days
24	Florea Țenescu [ro]	General de Divizie Adjutant; Florea Țenescu (1884–1941)	1 February 1939	23 August 1940	1 year, 204 days
25	Gheorghe Mihail	General de Divizie Adjutant; Gheorghe Mihail (1887–1982)	23 August 1940	6 September 1940	14 days
26	Alexandru Ioanițiu	General de Brigadă; Alexandru Ioanițiu (1890–1941)	6 September 1940	17 September 1941	359 days
27	Iosif Iacobici	General de Corp de Armată Adjutant; Iosif Iacobici (1884–1952)	22 September 1941	20 January 1942	153 days
28	Ilie Șteflea	General de Corp de Armată; Ilie Șteflea (1888–1946)	20 January 1942	23 August 1944	2 years, 216 days
(26)	Gheorghe Mihail	General de Divizie Adjutant; Gheorghe Mihail (1887–1982)	23 August 1944	12 October 1944	50 days
29	Nicolae Rădescu	General de Corp de Armată Adjutant; Nicolae Rădescu (1874–1953)	15 October 1944	6 December 1944	52 days
30	Constantin Sănătescu	General de Corp de Armată; Constantin Sănătescu (1885–1947)	11 December 1944	20 June 1945	221 days
31	Costin Ionașcu [ro]	General de Corp de Armată; Costin Ionașcu (1890–1969)	20 June 1945	27 December 1947	2 years, 190 days

=== Communist Romania (1947–1989) ===
No.	Portrait	Chief of the General Staff	Took office	Left office	Time in office
33	Constantin Gh. Popescu	Colonel General; Constantin Gh. Popescu (1893–1985)	30 January 1948	18 March 1950	2 years, 47 days
34	Leontin Sălăjan	Army General; Leontin Sălăjan (1913–1966)	18 March 1950	26 April 1954	4 years, 39 days
35	Ion Tutoveanu	General; Ion Tutoveanu (1914–2014)	26 April 1954	15 June 1965	11 years, 50 days
36	Gheorghe Ion [ro]	General; Gheorghe Ion (1923–2009)	15 June 1965	29 November 1974	9 years, 167 days
37	Ion Coman	Lieutenant General; Ion Coman (born 1926)	29 November 1974	16 June 1976	1 year, 200 days
38	Ion Hortopan [ro]	Lieutenant General; Ion Hortopan (1925–2000)	1 July 1976	31 March 1980	3 years, 274 days
39	Vasile Milea	Colonel General; Vasile Milea (1927–1989)	31 March 1980	16 February 1985	4 years, 322 days
40	Ștefan Gușă	Colonel General; Ștefan Gușă (1940–1994)	25 September 1986	28 December 1989	3 years, 97 days

=== Romania (1989–present) ===
No.	Portrait	Chief of the General Staff	Took office	Left office	Time in office	Defence branch
41	Vasile Ionel [ro]	General; Vasile Ionel (1927–2015)	29 December 1989	2 May 1991	1 year, 124 days	Army
42	Dumitru Cioflină [ro]	General; Dumitru Cioflină (born 1942)	3 May 1991	22 January 1997	5 years, 264 days	Army
43	Constantin Degeratu [ro]	General; Constantin Degeratu (born 1948)	22 January 1997	7 March 2000	3 years, 45 days	Army
44	Mircea Chelaru	Lieutenant General; Mircea Chelaru (born 1949)	7 March 2000	31 October 2000	238 days	Army
45	Mihail Eugen Popescu	General; Mihail Eugen Popescu (1948–2013)	31 October 2000	25 October 2004	3 years, 360 days	Army
46	Eugen Bădălan [ro]	General; Eugen Bădălan (born 1951)	25 October 2004	13 September 2006	1 year, 323 days	Army
47	Gheorghe Marin	Admiral; Gheorghe Marin (born 1952)	13 September 2006	31 December 2010	4 years, 109 days	Navy
48	Ștefan Dănilă	General; Ștefan Dănilă (born 1965)	1 January 2011	31 December 2014	3 years, 364 days	Air Force
49	Nicolae Ciucă	General; Nicolae Ciucă (born 1967)	1 January 2015	28 October 2019	4 years, 300 days	Army
50	Daniel Petrescu	General; Daniel Petrescu (born 1971)	28 November 2019	30 November 2023	4 years, 2 days	Army
51	Gheorghiță Vlad	General; Gheorghiță Vlad (born 1969)	30 November 2023	Incumbent	2 years, 306 days	Army

== See also ==
- Romanian Land Forces
- Romanian Air Force
- Romanian Naval Forces
- Army of the Socialist Republic of Romania
