= Ákos Birtalan =

Romanian economist and politician (1962–2011)

Ákos Birtalan (2 June 1962 – 24 August 2011) was a Romanian economist and politician. A member of the Democratic Alliance of Hungarians in Romania (UDMR), he was elected to the Chamber of Deputies in the legislative elections of 1992, and reelected in 1996 and 2000 (representing Covasna County). In 1996–1998, Birtalan was Minister of Tourism in Victor Ciorbea's cabinet (formed around the Romanian Democratic Convention, CDR).

Born in Vețca, Mureș County, he is a member of the Hungarian community. Birtalan graduated from the Babeș-Bolyai University's Faculty of Economic Sciences (1985), and took a PhD in economics from the Academy of Economic Studies in Bucharest. He has authored several scientific works in both Romanian and Hungarian, and is a member of the Association of Hungarian Economists in Romania, while serving as head of the Economic Budget-Finance Commission for the UDMR's Council of Union Representatives.

Inside the Chamber, Ákos Birtalan has served on the Committee for Economic Policy, Reform and Privatization (1992–1996), the Committee for Public Administration, Territorial Development and Environmental Balance (1996–2000), the Committee on Budget, Finance and Banks (2004, initially serving as its secretary), and the Committee for Industries and Services (2004). He became a member of government in December 1996, following an agreement between Ciorbea and the UDMR's President Béla Markó – when the CDR increased its support by appointing two cabinet members of the UDMR: Birtalan and the Minister-Delegate for National Minorities, György Tokay.

Birtalan was married and had two children.
