= Cârlogani =

- Commune
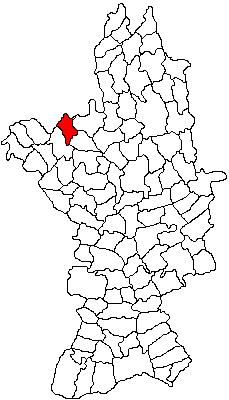
- Location in Olt County

- Location in Romania
- Coordinates: 44°31′N 24°09′E
- Country: Romania
- County: Olt
- Population (2021-12-01): 1,944
- Time zone: EET/EEST (UTC+2/+3)
- Vehicle reg.: OT

Cârlogani is a commune in Olt County, Oltenia, Romania. It is composed of five villages: Beculești, Cârlogani, Cepari, Scorbura and Stupina.
