= Teodor Atanasiu =

Romanian engineer and politician

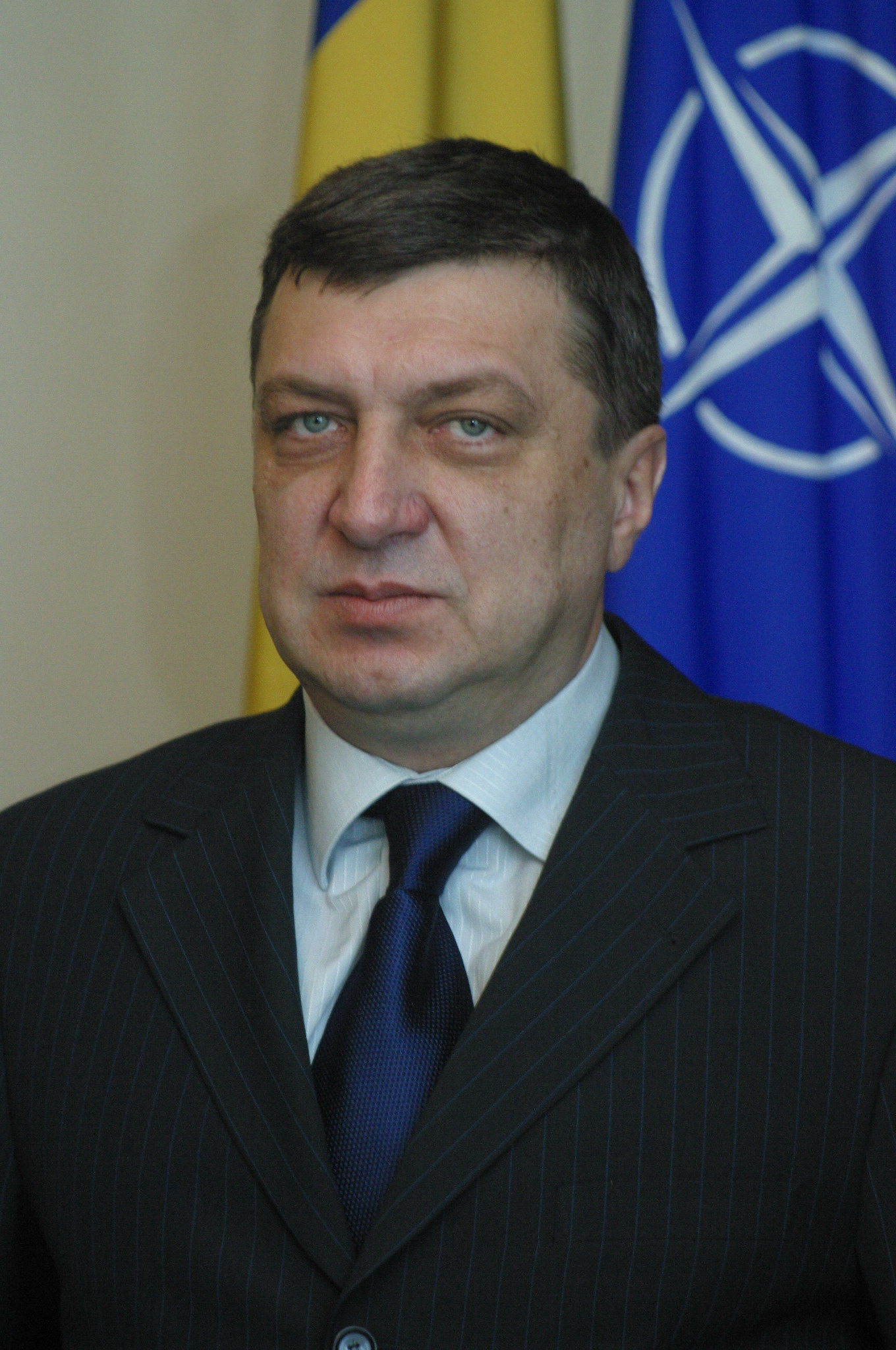
Teodor Atanasiu

Teodor Atanasiu (Romanian pronunciation: [te.oˈdor atanaˈsi.u]; born 23 September 1962) is a Romanian engineer and politician. A member of the National Liberal Party (PNL), he was Minister of National Defence in the Călin Popescu-Tăriceanu cabinet from December 2004 to October 2006. He was a member of the Romanian Chamber of Deputies for Alba County from 2008 to 2016.

He and his first wife had one daughter before divorcing in 2005 after twenty years of marriage. Soon afterward, he married Laura Bișboacă, a 25-year-old employee of the Alba County Council whom Atanasiu brought to Bucharest as an adviser at the Defence Ministry after being named to head that institution. The two married shortly thereafter, and have one daughter. Atanasiu later drew controversy for having Bișboacă's brother hired at the Agriculture Ministry (then controlled by a PNL colleague) and at the Authority for State Assets Recovery once Atanasiu was in charge there; as well as giving out jobs to his best man and business partner and to a business partner of his wife's.

== Biography ==
=== Early career ===
He was born in Cugir, Alba County and from 1982 to 1987 attended the Vehicle Construction Technology section of the Technical University of Cluj-Napoca's Mechanics Faculty. From 1987 to 1995, he was an engineer at the mechanical plant in his native town, serving as chief of production from 1995 to 1996 and as director from 1997 to 2001. From 1994 to 1996, he belonged to the administrative council of another factory there, while heading a water company in Alba Iulia from 1996 to 1997. From 1997 to 2000, he was on the administrative council of the former State Property Fund, and from 2001 to June 2004, he administered a Dinu Patriciu-owned, Rompetrol subsidiary, pipe manufacturer in Sibiu.

Atanasiu entered politics shortly after the 1989 Revolution, joining the PNL in February 1990. From the following month until 1992, he was secretary of the party's Cugir organisation, and its president from 1992 to 1993. Since 1993, he has been president of the Alba County PNL chapter. From 1992 to 1996, he was a member of the Cugir town council, and in 1996 joined the Alba County Council, of which he was president from June to December 2004. He was on the PNL's permanent central bureau from 2001 to 2002 and from 2005 to 2006, also serving as a party vice president from 2006 to 2008.

=== Defence Minister ===
He was named Defence Minister at the end of 2004, among the cited reasons being his work at the Cugir plant (which specialised in military equipment) and his co-authorship in 2000 of a strategy for restructuring Romania's defence industry. Among his initiatives as minister were a reorganisation of the ministry, including a fight against corruption there and an elimination of redundancies; rest homes for combatants and houses for soldiers; and compensatory pay for personnel dismissed as part of an ongoing reduction in size of the Romanian Armed Forces. He also promoted a law ending conscription from 2007, a change he said would promote stability and discipline. He was in office during severe flooding in 2005 that the Army helped combat. He promoted a close strategic partnership with the United States, including a plan for building American military bases in Romania. However, despite affirming his commitment to Romania's participation in both the Iraq War and the War in Afghanistan in 2005, the following year he sought Romania's withdrawal from Iraq, a decision opposed and blocked by President Traian Băsescu. Other controversies came when he implied but later backed away from the possibility of intervening militarily in Transnistria's frozen conflict; and when he disciplined crew members of the Romanian frigate Regina Maria who went on a hunger strike.

Atanasiu's downfall as minister began in July 2006, when he remarked on television that the military intelligence service was spying on the presidential administration, and specifically on spokeswoman Adriana Săftoiu. This prompted Săftoiu to sue him for abuse of office, In September, by which time the Social Democratic parliamentarian Eugen Bejinariu had also sued, Băsescu suspended the minister, citing the need to avoid any suspicion that the investigation might be compromised. The PNL objected to the decision, with Tăriceanu calling the step legal but not obligatory, and party spokesman Varujan Vosganian viewing it as retaliation for his Iraq stance. Shortly thereafter, prosecutors decided not to pursue charges, but Atanasiu remained suspended and in late October, with Băsescu poised to dismiss him, resigned, despite a vow several days earlier to stay on until a judicial request he had made to be reinstated was resolved.

=== Subsequent developments ===
Tăriceanu immediately named Atanasiu head of the Authority for State Assets Recovery (AVAS), a position he held until December 2008. He resigned because he had just been elected to the Chamber of Deputies, where he served until September 2009 on the economics, reform and privatisation committee, and continues to serve on the joint parliamentary committee providing oversight to the activities of the Romanian Intelligence Service.

At the 2012 local election, he ran for president of the Alba County Council, coming in second with 40.5% of the vote and losing to the Democratic Liberal Party incumbent, the only one of his party to win such a post at the election. That autumn, he was returned to parliament. In late 2014, he was a candidate for the PNL presidency, but withdrew from the race shortly before it was decided, casting his support behind the winner, Alina Gorghiu. Atanasiu ran for a Buzău County seat in the Senate at the 2016 election, but lost.
