= Carol I National Defence University =

University in Bucharest, Romania

Coordinates: 44.430048°N 26.066211°E

- Universitatea Națională de Apărare „Carol I”
- Former names: Higher War School (1889–1948); Military Academy (1948–1991); High Military Studies Academy (1991–2003)
- Motto: Labor improbus omnia vincit (Latin: "Hard work overcomes everything")
- Type: Military Academy
- Established: 1889; 137 years ago
- Affiliations: IAMP
- Rector: Brigadier General Gabriel-Florin Moisescu
- Academic staff: 98
- Students: 1,897 (2012–2013)
- Undergraduates: -
- Postgraduates: 834
- Other students: 1,063
- Location: 68-72 Șoseaua Panduri, Sector 5, Bucharest, 050662, Romania
- Campus: Urban
- Website: www.unap.ro
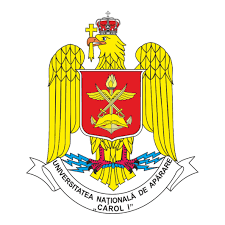

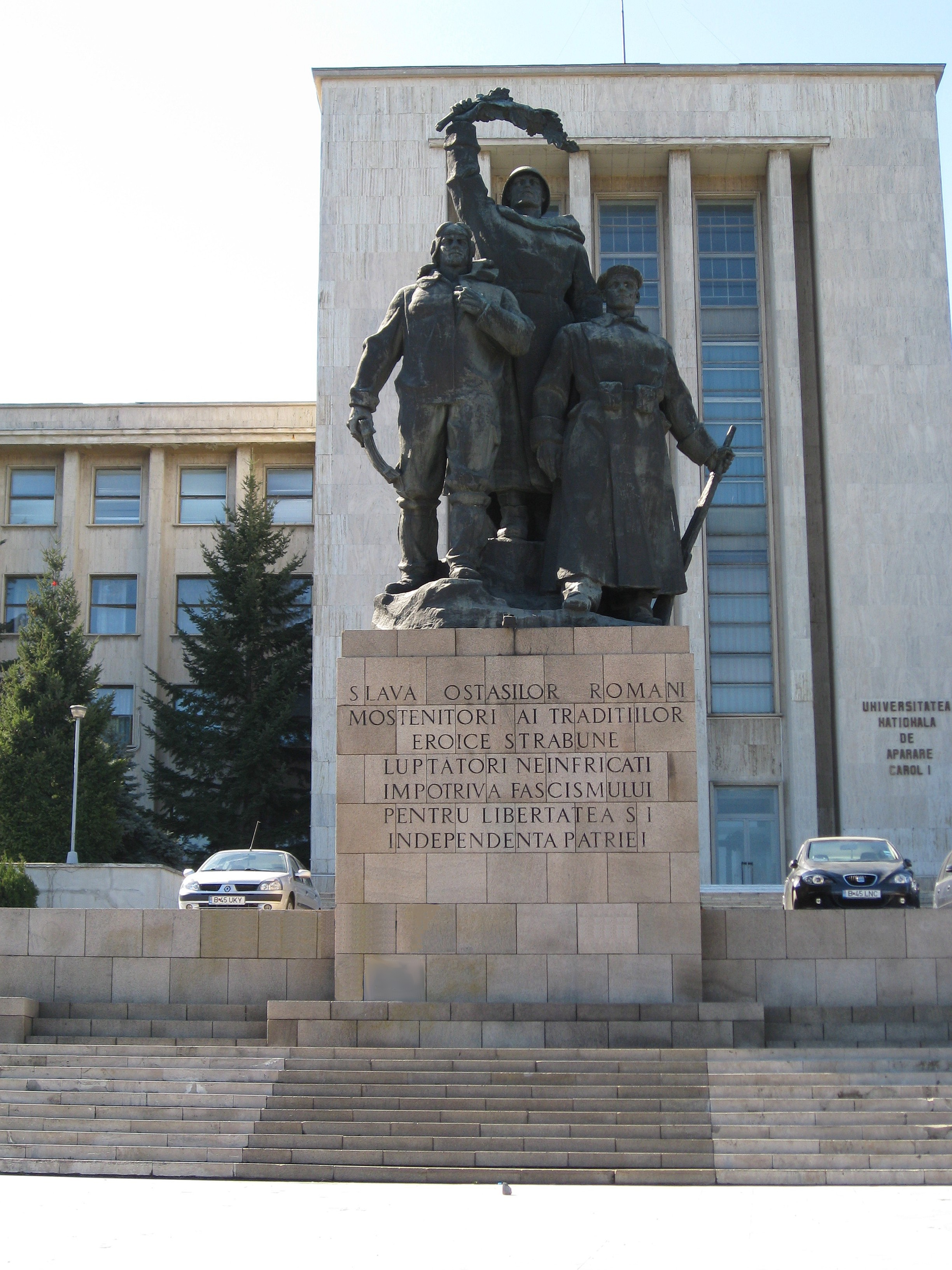
Statue facing entrance. Inscription reads: "Glory to the Romanian troops, inheritors of ancient heroic traditions, undaunted fighters against fascism for the fatherland's liberty and independence".

The Carol I National Defence University (Romanian: Universitatea Națională de Apărare „Carol I" (UNAp)) is an institution of higher education, located in Bucharest, Romania. It was established in 1889 by Ștefan Fălcoianu under the name Higher War School. In 2005, it was renamed in honor of the Romanian King Carol I. The universities motto is "Great labor overcomes everything."

The Carol I National Defence University seeks to train military and civilian experts in security and national defense. It undertakes scientific studies related to these matters, when requested by relevant state authorities. The university is a member of the International Association for Military Pedagogy (IAMP), whose members include military and civilian professionals from military institutions of advanced learning.

The main building of the University, built in 1937–1939, was designed by architect Duiliu Marcu. It is located at 68-72 Șoseaua Panduri, Sector 5.
