= List of government-run higher-level national military academies =

This is a list of government-run higher-level military academies worldwide:

== Argentina ==
- Escuela Superior de Guerra (Argentina)
- Colegio Militar de la Nación – El Palomar, Buenos Aires Province
- Military Naval School – Río Santiago, Buenos Aires Province
- Military Aviation School – Córdoba, Córdoba Province

== Australia ==
- Australian Defence Force Academy
- Royal Military College, Duntroon

== Austria ==
- Theresian Military Academy – Wiener Neustadt (the oldest military academy in the world, founded by Empress Maria Theresa)

== Bangladesh ==
- Bangladesh Military Academy - Chittagong
- Bangladesh Naval Academy - Patenga, Chittagong
- Bangladesh Air Force Academy - Jashore

== Belgium ==
- Royal Military Academy – Brussels

== Brazil ==
- Agulhas Negras Military Academy – Rio de Janeiro
- Brazilian Air Force Academy – Pirassununga
- Brazilian Naval Academy – Rio de Janeiro

== Bulgaria ==
- Vasil Levski National Military University, Veliko Tarnovo
  - Faculty of Anti-Aircraft Defence – Shumen
  - Faculty of Aviation – Dolna Mitropoliya
- Rakovski Defence and Staff College, Sofia
- Nikola Vaptsarov Naval Academy, Varna

== Canada ==
- Royal Military College of Canada – Kingston, Ontario
- Collège militaire royal de Saint-Jean – Saint-Jean, Quebec

== China ==
- PLA National University of Defense Technology
- PLA Information Engineering University
- PLA National Defense University
- Army Command College of the Chinese People's Liberation Army

== Czech Republic ==
- University of Defence – Brno

== Egypt ==
- Egyptian Military Academy
  - Egyptian Air College
  - Egyptian Air Defense College
  - Egyptian Naval College
  - Military Technical College
  - Egyptian Military College
- Military Academy for Postgraduate and Strategic Studies

== Estonia ==
- Estonian Military Academy - Tartu
- Baltic Defence College – Tartu

== Finland ==
- National Defence University – Helsinki

== France ==
- École Spéciale Militaire de Saint-Cyr – Coëtquidan
- École Navale
- École de l'Air
- École Polytechnique (though still under military management and with most undergraduate students military cadets, is not a military academy any more)

== Germany ==
- Führungsakademie der Bundeswehr – Hamburg

== Greece ==
- Hellenic Army Academy – Athens
- Hellenic Air Force Academy – Athens
- Hellenic Naval Academy - Piraeus
- Hellenic Military Academy of Combat Support Officers - Thessaloniki
- Hellenic Military Academy of Nursing Officers - Athens

== India ==
- Indian Military Academy – Dehradun
- Rashtriya Indian Military College – Dehradun
- National Defence Academy – Khadakwasla
- Defence Services Staff College – Wellington
- Air Force Academy – Dundigal
- Indian Naval Academy – Ezhimala
- Indian Coast Guard Academy – Mangalore
- Officers Training Academy – Chennai

== Indonesia ==
- Akademi Militer – Magelang
- Akademi Angkatan Udara – Yogyakarta
- Akademi Angkatan Laut – Surabaya
- Universitas Pertahanan – Sentul Bogor

== Italy ==
- Centro Alti Studi per la Difesa – Roma
  - Istituto Alti Studi per la Difesa
  - Istituto Superiore di Stato Maggiore Interforze
- Accademia Militare – Modena
- Accademia Navale – Livorno
- Accademia Aeronautica – Pozzuoli, Naples

== Japan ==
- National Defense Academy of Japan – Yokosuka, Kanagawa
- Japan National Defense Medical College – Tokorozawa, Saitama
- Japan Coast Guard Academy – Kure, Hiroshima
- Naval Academy Etajima – Etajima, Hiroshima

== Latvia ==
- National Defence Academy of Latvia – Riga

== Malaysia ==
- National Defence University of Malaysia – Kuala Lumpur

== Mexico ==
- Heroico Colegio Militar – Mexico City
- Heroica Escuela Naval Militar – Veracruz

== Myanmar ==
- Defence Services Academy
- Defence Services Technological Academy
- Defence Services Medical Academy
- Officer Training School
- Command and General Staff College
- National Defence College
- Military Institute of Nursing and Paramedical Science

== Netherlands ==
- Koninklijke Militaire Academie – Breda
- Royal Netherlands Naval College (Koninklijk Instituut voor de Marine) – Den Helder
- Netherlands Defence Academy – Breda and Den Helder

== New Zealand ==
- New Zealand Defence College – Trentham Military Camp, Upper Hutt

== Nigeria ==
Supervised by Nigerian Ministry of Defence

- Nigerian Defence Academy – Kaduna
- Nigerian Army University – Borno
- Nigerian Maritime University – Delta

== North Korea ==
- Kim Il-sung Military University

== Norway ==
- Norwegian Military Academy – Oslo
- Royal Norwegian Air Force War Academy – Trondheim
- Royal Norwegian Naval War Academy – Bergen

== Pakistan ==
- Pakistan Military Academy – Kakul
- Pakistan Air Force Academy – Risalpur
- Pakistan Naval Academy – Karachi
- Pakistan Marine Academy – Karachi
- Pakistan Command and Staff College – Quetta

== Philippines ==
- Philippine Military Academy (PMA) – Loakan, Baguio
- Philippine Merchant Marine Academy (PMMA) – San Narciso, Zambales

== Poland ==
- War Studies Academy – Warsaw
- Military University of Technology in Warsaw
- Tadeusz Kościuszko Land Forces Military Academy – Wrocław
- Air Forces Military Academy – Dęblin
- Polish Naval Academy – Gdynia
- Medical University of Łódź, Faculty of Military Medicine

== Portugal ==
- Escola Naval – Almada
- Academia Militar – Lisbon
- Academia da Força Aérea – Sintra
- Instituto de Estudos Superiores Militares – Lisbon

== Romania ==
- Academy of Higher Military Studies – Bucharest
- Technical Military Academy – Bucharest
- Mircea cel Bătrân Naval Academy – Constanţa

== Russia ==
- Military Academy of the General Staff of the Armed Forces of Russia
- N. G. Kuznetsov Naval Academy
- Zhukovsky – Gagarin Air Force Academy
- Military Engineering-Technical University

== Serbia ==
- Serbia Military Academy – Belgrade
- Military Medical Academy – Belgrade

== Singapore ==
- SAFTI Military Institute

== South Africa ==
- South African Military Academy – Saldanha Bay

== South Korea ==
- Korea Military Academy – Taerung
- Korea National Defense University
- Republic of Korea Naval Academy - Pusan
- Republic of Korea Air Force Academy - Chungjoo
- Korea Armed Forces Nursing Academy - Taejeon
- Korea Army Academy at Yeongcheon - Yeongcheon

== Spain ==
- Academia General Militar – Zaragoza
- Escuela Naval Militar – Marín, Pontevedra
- Academia General del Aire – San Javier, Murcia

== Sri Lanka ==
- Sir John Kotelawala Defence University – Colombo
- Naval and Maritime Academy
- Air Force Academy, China Bay
- Sri Lanka Military Academy

== Sweden ==
- Military Academy Karlberg – Karlberg Castle, Stockholm
- Swedish National Defence College – Stockholm

== Switzerland ==
- Military Academy at ETH (MILAK) – Zürich

== Taiwan ==
- ROC Military Academy – Fongshan
- ROC Naval Academy
- ROC Air Force Academy
- National Defense University
- National Defense Medical Center

== Thailand ==
- Chulachomklao Royal Military Academy – Nakhon Nayok
- Royal Thai Naval Academy – Pak nam, Samut Prakan
- Royal Thai Air Force Academy – Don Mueang, Bangkok

== Turkey ==
- National Defense University
- Turkish Military Academy – Ankara
- Turkish Naval Academy – Istanbul
- Turkish Air Force Academy – Istanbul

== Uganda ==
- Uganda Senior Command and Staff College: Kimaka, Jinja, Jinja District.
- UPDF Air Force Academy: Nakasongola, Nakasongola District
- Uganda Military Engineering College: Lugazi, Buikwe District
- Uganda Military Academy: Kabamba, Mubende District
- National Defence College, Uganda: Njeru, Buikwe District.

== United Kingdom ==
- Britannia Royal Naval College – Dartmouth
- Royal Military Academy Sandhurst – Camberley
- Royal Air Force College – Cranwell

== United States ==
- United States Military Academy – West Point, New York
- United States Naval Academy – Annapolis, Maryland
- United States Air Force Academy – Colorado Springs, Colorado
- United States Coast Guard Academy – New London, Connecticut
- United States Merchant Marine Academy – Kings Point, New York
- Uniformed Services University of the Health Sciences – Bethesda, Maryland
- National Defense University
