= Esa Pulkkinen =

Finnish lieutenant general (born 1957)

Lieutenant general Esa Pulkkinen
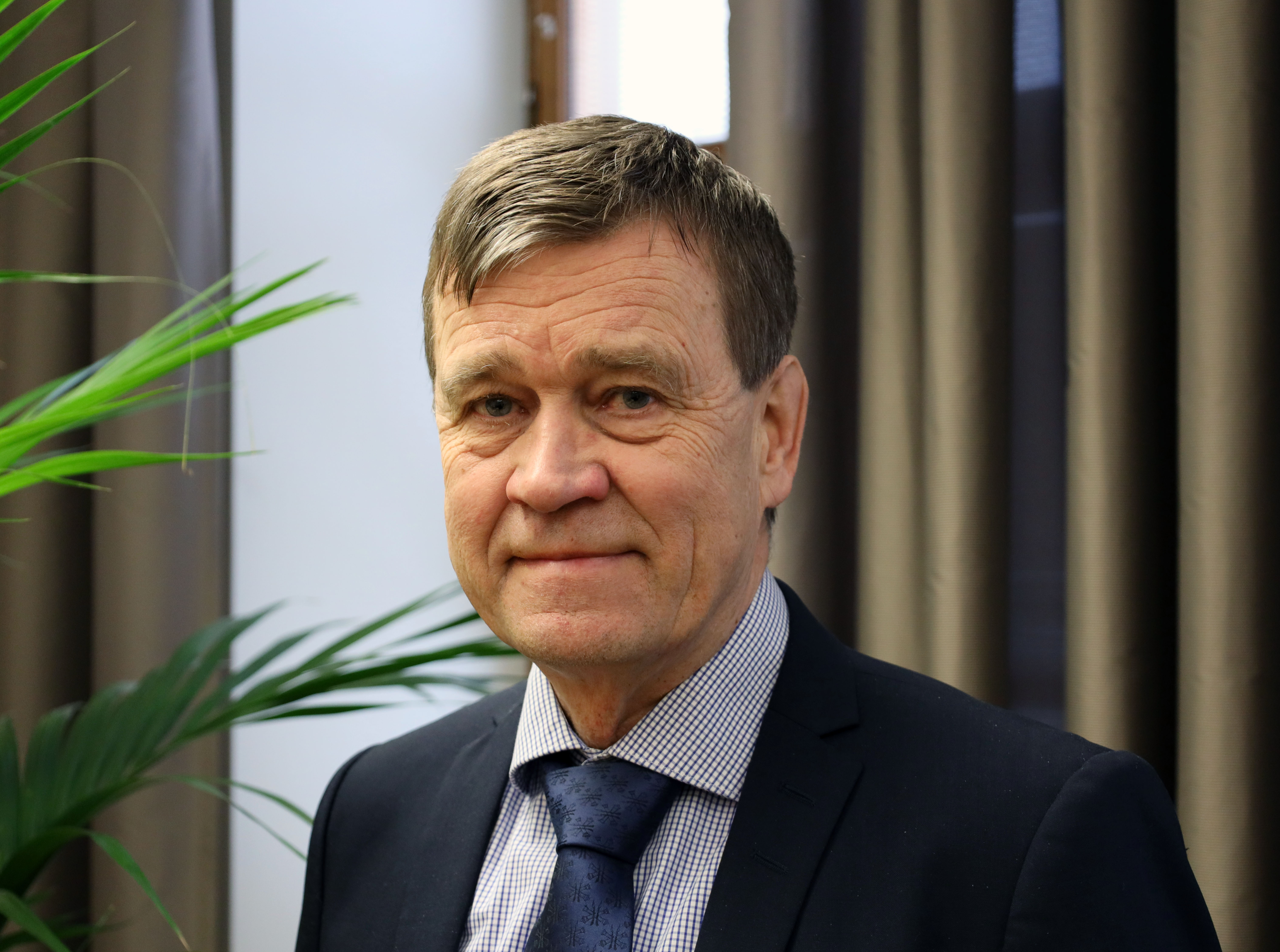
- Pulkkinen in 2022

6th Director General of the European Union Military Staff
- In office 1 May 2016 – 30 June 2020
- Preceded by: Wolfgang Wosolsobe
- Succeeded by: Hervé Bléjean

Personal details
- Born: 6 July 1957 (age 69) Kalvola, Finland
- Children: 2
- Education: University of Geneva; Harvard University

Military service
- Allegiance: Finland; European Union
- Branch/service: Finnish Army (1980–present)
- Years of service: 1980–
- Rank: Lieutenant general
- Commands: Armoured Brigade; Jaeger Brigade; European Union Military Staff
- Awards: Order of the White Rose of Finland; Common Security and Defence Policy Service Medal; Order of the Lion of Finland

Esa Ilmari Pulkkinen (born 6 July 1957) is a Finnish lieutenant general who served as Director General of the Defence Policy Department in the Ministry of Defence from 2010 to 2016 and again from 2020 to 2021. From 2016 to 2020, he served as the Director General of the European Union Military Staff (EUMS). Since 1 January 2022 he has been serving as the Permanent Secretary in the Ministry of Defence of Finland

== Early life and career ==
Esa Pulkkinen was born in Kalvola in southern Finland in 1957. He graduated from the National Defence University in 1980 and completed his master's degree in 1985. He graduated from the Department of Public Safety at the Military Academy in 1987–1989 and studied as a postgraduate student in security at the University of Geneva in 1995–1996. After returning to Finland, he completed a course for senior officers in 1997 and a senior military training course in 2005. He studied at Harvard University in the United States in 2014.

Pulkkinen served as a platoon leader, head of the Armoured Officer Course and company commander in the Armoured Brigade at Parolanummi from 1980 to 1987. After that, he served as Commander of the Army of the East Uusimaa Military District in Tuusula until 1990.

== Military career ==
Between 1990 and 1993, he served as the Chief of Staff of the Infantry Department of the General Staff and from 1993 to 1995 as Chief of Staff at the Operational Section. From 1996 to 1997 he worked as a tactic at the Military Science School. From 1997 to 1999, he served as Senior Officer at the Ministry of Defence's Defence Policy Department. Between 1999 and 2000 he served as Director of the Armoured Forces in Parola before receiving a post as a national expert in Brussels to the EU's Temporary Military Staff for the period from 10 April to 30 November 2000. Thereafter, he served as Head of the Planning Department of the European Union Military Staff Management Department until the end of July 2003.

After returning to Finland, he took command of the Jaeger Brigade in Sodankylä until the end of January 2006. When Finland received the Presidency of the Council of the European Union in July 2006, Pulkkinen was invited to the Defence Policy Department of the Ministry of Defence to chair the working party of the Presidency. From the beginning of 2007 until the end of August 2008, Pulkkinen served as deputy director of the Defence Command Planning Department, after which he was again assigned to the EU Military Staff in Brussels as Director of Operations. On 1 January 2011, he returned to Finland as Director General of the Defence Policy Department of the Ministry of Defence, where he served as a five-year term between 1 January 2011 and 31 December 2015. Pulkkinen was again appointed as Director General of the Defence Policy Department for another five-year period from 1 January 2016 to 31 December 2020.

In May 2016, Pulkkinen became Director General of the European Union Military Staff. The election of the Military Staff Commander was carried out by the Armed Forces Commanders of the EU Member States. On 8 June 2017, the Council decided to set up a Military Planning and Conduct Capability (MPCC) within the EUMS. According to the Council Decision, the Director General also serves as the MPCC leader, so Pulkkinen began to lead the MPCC from 8 June 2017. Under this title, he had responsibility for delivering the functions of mission commander for the EU training missions in Mali, Central African Republic and Somalia.

After the service in EUMS, in 2021 Pulkkinen returned to his former post as Director General of the Defence Policy Department, and was appointed Permanent Secretary at the Ministry of Defence of Finland 1 January 2022. He is also the Chair of the Security Committee. The Security Committee is a permanent and broad-based cooperation body for proactive preparedness and its role is to assist the Finnish Government in matters of comprehensive security.

Since 2021, Pulkkinen has also been a member of the Irish Defence Commission.

== Personal life ==
Pulkkinen is married and has two grown children.
