= Prussian Academy =

Prussian Academy may refer to:

- Prussian Academy of Arts (Preußische Akademie der Künste), an art school set up in Berlin in 1694/1696, disbanded in 1955 after the 1954 foundation of two separate academies of art for East Berlin and West Berlin in 1954, which merged in 1993 to form the present-day Academy of Arts, Berlin (Akademie der Künste, Berlin)
- Prussian Academy of Sciences, an academic academy established in Berlin in 1700; following German reunification, the academy was disbanded and the Berlin-Brandenburg Academy of Sciences and Humanities (Berlin-Brandenburgische Akademie der Wissenschaften) was founded in its place
- Prussian Military Academy, renamed Staff College, dissolved following World War II
