= Wim A. G. Blonk =

Dutch economist (born 1939)

Wilhelmus Adrianus Gerardus Blonk (born 15 January 1939) is a Dutch economist. He is currently a member of the board of the Close the Gap Foundation and has published 3 books, 20 studies, ca. 40 articles and more than 500 public speeches.

== Education ==
Born in Amsterdam, Blonk attended the Dalton High School in The Hague from 1951 to 1957 and received a HBS-B diploma. From 1957 to 1963 he attended the Nederlandse Economische Hogeschool (now Erasmus Universiteit) in Rotterdam and studied; macro and micro economics, industrial economics and transport economics and policy. He then Became a Doctor in economic sciences after being awarded his PhD on a subject dealing with transport in the European Union at the Erasmus University in 1968.

== Career ==
Blonk has had and continues to have many professional occupations. Before completing his PhD between 1961 and 1962 he did a 6-month training (stage) at the EEC-Commission in Brussels. in 1964 he worked at the Ministry of Economic Affairs in the Hague for 8 months and was later appointed an administrator in the ECC-Commission.

From 1964 to 1984 he worked for the European Commission in several positions. From May 1985 until May 1991 he head of the head of Division for Southern Africa in the Directorate General for Development (DG VIII).

From June 1991 to October 1995 he was Director for Maritime Transport and Ports in the Directorate for General Transport (DG VII). From October 1995 until June 1999 he was Director for Transport Policy Research and Development at the Directorate of General Transport (DG VII).

On 1 July 1999, he retired from the EU-Commission as honorary director general. He was also has been a part-time professor at the Vrije Universiteit Brussel (VUB) from 1970 until 2004 where he taught several subjects. From 1970 to 1991 he taught Transport Economics and policy. From 1973 to 1997 he taught Economic and Social Aspects of Ecology from 1976 to 1986 he taught Transport Aspects in Industrial Location. He then moved on to teaching European Integration in 1988 through to 2004 and finally Innovation from 2001 to 2004. He has also been a Part-time professor for Transport Economics and Politics at the Koninklijke Militaire Academie (KMA) in Breda in Netherlands.
