= Richard G. Tieskens =

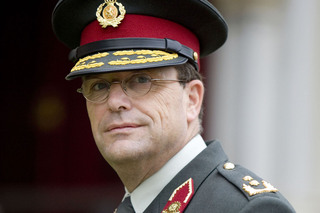
- Richard Tieskens as Major General in 2010
- Born: October 24, 1957 (age 68); Breda
- Military career
- Allegiance: Netherlands
- Branch: Royal Netherlands Army
- Service years: 1976–present
- Rank: Lieutenant General
- Commands: Netherlands Defence Academy
- Conflicts: Stabilisation Force (SFOR); War in Afghanistan

Richard G. Tieskens (born 1957) is a three-star general with the Royal Netherlands Army. As of February 2012 he serves as chief of staff at Joint Force Command Brunssum.

== Biography ==
Tieskens joined the army in 1976 at the Royal Military Academy. After completing his education at the academy, he was commissioned into the Engineer Corps where he served as a lieutenant and captain. Between 1986 and 1990, Richard Tieskens took his master's degree in electrical engineering at Delft University in The Netherlands.

After graduation from university he was promoted to major and subsequently appointed to various positions in the Royal Netherlands Army one of them being at the Royal Netherlands Army's Directorate for Materiel. As a lieutenant-colonel he served at the Ministry of Defence as an assistant to the Secretary of State for international relations. In 1998 he was deployed in the SFOR mission in the former Yugoslavia. After his return, he worked for the bi-national 1 (German/Netherlands) Corps Staff in Münster, Germany. In his role as DACOS G4 he contributed to the successful transition of the Münster Headquarters into a multinational HRFHQ.

In 2001 he was promoted to colonel and appointed to command the Royal Netherlands Army National Supply Agency. The Agency is responsible for the purchase, storage and distribution of the complete stocks of ammunition, spare parts, fuel, clothing and food.

Promoted to brigadier general in 2004, Tieskens was appointed deputy director of the Defense Infrastructure Agency. The agency is responsible for the construction, engineering and maintenance of total military infrastructure in the Netherlands.

In 2006 he was deployed to Afghanistan as contingent commander of the Netherlands' Forces. During this tour of duty the Netherlands deployed the Task Force Uruzgan, while having an operational Provincial Reconstruction Team in the Baghlan province and contributed to the ISAF operation with an F-16 detachment.

By the end of 2007 he was appointed as director of the Defence Infrastructure Agency. In 2009 he took over as the deputy commander of the Netherlands Defence Support Shared Service Centre (12.000 personnel), responsible for Medical Care, ICT, Personnel Services, Infrastructure and Facility Services.

In 2010 Richard Tieskens was promoted to major general and was appointed to commandant of the Netherlands Defence Academy, responsible for the officer training and education of all services and including the Joint Staff College.

In 2012 promoted to lieutenant-general he took over as the Chief of Staff Joint Force Command Brunssum.

Richard Tieskens and his wife Marie-José have four children in the age of 25 to 19. His interests include reading about military history and science. Further he enjoys most sports with cycling, soccer and walking as particular favourites.
