= International Society of Military Sciences =

- Abbreviation: ISMS
- Formation: October 22, 2008
- Type: International Society
- Legal status: active
- Purpose: to further research and academic education in military arts and sciences
- Region served: International
- Members: Austrian National Defence Academy, the Royal Military College of Canada, the Royal Danish Defence College, the Finnish National Defence University, the Netherlands Defence Academy, the Norwegian Defence University College, the Swedish National Defence College, the Baltic Defence College, National Defence University of Warsaw and the Military University Institute in Portugal. The Royal Military Academy (Belgium) was a member between 2011-2017.
- Official language: English
- Website: http://www.isofms.org
- Remarks: to further research and academic education in military arts and sciences

The International Society of Military Sciences (ISMS) is an international organization whose stated aim is to build a strong network for the creation, development, exchange and diffusion of research and knowledge about war, conflict management and peace support efforts. The ISMS was founded in October 2008. The Austrian National Defence Academy, the Royal Military College of Canada, the Royal Danish Defence College, the Finnish National Defence University, the Netherlands Defence Academy, the Norwegian Defence University College, the Swedish National Defence College and the Baltic Defence College established this society with the intention to further research and academic education in military arts and sciences in the broadest sense.

== Establishing the ISMS ==
In the summer of 2007 the Faculty of Military Sciences, Netherlands Defence Academy, started working on more international collaboration on an institutional level. Canada, Sweden and Austria were the first military institutes and universities which were approached for collaboration. Soon four other institutes joined in. In November 2011, the War Studies University in Warsaw and the Royal Military Academy (Belgium) were voted in. The Royal Military Academy of Belgium withdrew their membership before the council meeting in Oslo, May 2017. The latest induction to the ISMS is the Military University Institute in Portugal that was inducted during the Council meeting in Vienna, November 2019.

== Letter of Intent ==
The formal signing of the Letter of Intent was on October 22, 2008 in Copenhagen. That day the participating academies also decided to formally present the ISMS in November 2009 during its first annual international conference which was to be held in the Netherlands. The theme of this first conference was “Security in 2020 in a Multi-Polar World”.

=== Letter of Intent ===
1) The undersigned institutions of Austria, Canada, Denmark, Finland, the Netherlands, Norway, and Sweden, and the Baltic Defence College (later referred to as the institutions) agree to establish a society intended to further research and academic education in military arts and sciences in the broadest sense. This association is titled International Society of Military Sciences (hereafter referred to as the Society).

2) The purpose of the Society is to build a network for the creation, development, exchange and diffusion of research and knowledge about war, conflict management and peace support efforts.

3) The Society will establish an annual conference, and one or more workshops per year. Activities include communications and publications to support a research network within topics such as: war studies; military history; military technology; command and control, leadership and basic competence; law and ethics; security and defence policy and strategy; armed forces and society; and defence economics and management. These are detailed in Annex A.

4) The representatives of the member institutions constitute the Council as the highest authority governing the Society. The Council elects a Board governing the Society. The purpose of the Board is to initiate and coordinate the activities of the Society. The institution hosting the annual conference provides the secretariat for the Society for the period of one year.

5) Society members commit themselves to organise and participate in various workshops, conference or working groups, with the understanding that they will endeavour to lead at least one working group or workshop and participate in at least two others. A tentative schedule of upcoming events is attached at Annex B.

6) The Society will be established for the four-year term in October 2008 upon signing of Letter of Intent by the institutions, and it is announced at the First Annual Conference.

7) The first Annual Conference will be held in November 2009. Invitations to participate in the Conference and to join the Society will be distributed widely. The Council will consider applications for new membership by compatible organizations annually. However, participation in conferences and workshops is welcomed at any time.

== Organizational Format ==
The ISMS is an institutional membership organization composed of higher military educational institutions in smaller and medium-sized nations. Membership of the ISMS is open to defence universities and colleges conducting research and teaching at the highest national level. The Charter specifically state that its members must be free to conduct research without political control and interference and they must operate in a political system with firm democratic control over the armed forces. More so, membership is by invitation only.

The governing body of the ISMS is the Council, which is made up of one representative of each member institution. The Chairmanship of the Council is assumed by the ISMS Presidency. The Presidency of the ISMS rotates on an annual basis between the member institutions. It is the role of the Presidency to host the annual ISMS conference. As of the Council-meeting in Oslo November 2017 the ISMS decided to elect a designated Council-member to act as the ISMS Secretary for a period three years. ISMS uses a thematic Working Group division where each working group is led by a Chairperson.

=== Presidencies and Presidents ===
The presidency of ISMS has been held by the following:

- 2025–2026: Baltic Defence College, Estonia – Dr. Tiia-Triin Truusa
- 2024–2025: Netherlands Defence Academy, Netherlands – Associate Professor Dr. René Moelker
- 2023–2024: Swedish Defence University, Sweden – Professor Kjell Engelbrekt
- 2022–2023: Royal Danish Defence College, Denmark – Professor Dr. Niels Bo Poulsen
- 2021-2022: Military University Institute, Portugal – Commodore João Paulo Ramalho Marreiros
- 2020-2021: Royal Military College of Canada, Canada – Dr. H. J. (Harry) Kowal
- 2019–2020: Finnish National Defence University, Finland – Professor Dr. Hannu H. Kari
- 2018–2019: Austrian National Defence Academy, Austria – Brigadier General Dr. Wolfgang Peischel
- 2017–2018: War Studies University, Poland – Professor Ryszard Szpyra
- 2016–2017: Norwegian Defence University College, Norway – LtCol. Dr. Anders McD Sookermany
- 2015-2016: War Studies University, Poland - Professor Ryszard Szpyra
- 2014-2015: Finnish National Defence University, Finland - Professor Dr. Hannu H. Kari
- 2013-2014: Austrian National Defence College, Vienna - Brigader General Dr. Walter Feichtinger
- 2012-2013: Royal Danish Defence College, Copenhagen - Dr. Niels Bo Poulsen
- 2011-2012: Royal Military College of Canada - Professor Houchang Hassan-Yari
- 2010-2011: Baltic Defence College - Professor James Corum
- 2009-2010: Swedish National Defence College - Professor Dr. Maja Kirilova-Eriksson
- 2008-2009: Netherlands Defence Academy - Professor Alexander Bon

== Annual ISMS Conferences ==
- 2026, November 9–12: The ISMS annual conference is scheduled to be hosted by the Baltic Defence College in Tartu, Estonia, under the theme "Military Sciences in Action: From Operational Insights to Defence Innovation." The programme includes plenary sessions, presentations across the Society's ten working groups, a Young Scholar Workshop, and meetings of the ISMS Council and the commandants of member institutions. The conference's Book of Abstracts contains 227 abstract entries, including two collective roundtable abstracts, distributed across the Society's ten working groups. More than 150 presentations are scheduled, with over 200 participants registered for the conference.
- 2025, October 13–14: The seventeenth annual ISMS conference was hosted by the Netherlands Defence Academy at the Marine Establishment in Amsterdam, the Netherlands. The conference theme was "Conflict in a Fragmenting World Order." General (ret.) Dr. Allard J. E. Wagemaker, one of the Society's founders, delivered the keynote address. The concluding plenary session featured ISMS President René Moelker and Dr. Tiia-Triin Truusa. A draft of the conference's ''Book of Abstracts'' listed 97 abstracts across the Society's ten working groups. The conference also included interdisciplinary roundtable discussions on military research and professional education. Additional Council and institutional meetings were held on October 12 and 15.
- 2024, September 10–12: The sixteenth annual ISMS conference was hosted by the Swedish Defence University in Stockholm, Sweden, under the theme "Scaling Up, Learning Lessons, Ensuring Quality." The keynote speakers were Brigadier General Patrik Gardesten, Deputy Chief of the Royal Swedish Navy, and Associate Professor Antoine Bousquet of the Swedish Defence University. The conference's Book of Abstracts contained 118 abstracts covering the Society's ten working groups and was published in cooperation with NATO DEEP e-Academy Press.
- 2023, November 6–8: The fifteenth annual ISMS conference was hosted by the Royal Danish Defence College in Copenhagen, Denmark. The conference theme was "Military Alliances." More than 100 abstracts were selected for presentation across the Society's ten working groups. Keynote speakers included General (ret.) Knud Bartels and Dr Peter Viggo Jakobsen. Lieutenant General (ret.) Michael Ankers Lollesgaard was the conference dinner speaker.
- 2022, October 10–13: The fourteenth annual ISMS conference was hosted by the Military University Institute in Lisbon, Portugal, in a hybrid format. The conference theme was "Promoting Peace and Security in a new incomprehensible and non-linear world." Plenary speakers included Professor António Telo and Admiral António Silva Ribeiro, Chief of the General Staff of the Portuguese Armed Forces. The conference's Book of Abstracts contained 163 extended abstracts organized across the Society's ten working groups.
- 2021, October 11–14: The thirteenth annual ISMS conference was organized by the Royal Military College of Canada in Kingston, Ontario, Canada, and held virtually. The conference theme was "Progress in Military Sciences for Resilience and Cohesion in the Face of New Forms of Disruption." The keynote speaker was Professor Thomas Homer-Dixon, who addressed climate security.
- 2020, October 27–29: The twelfth annual ISMS conference was hosted virtually by the Finnish National Defence University in Helsinki, Finland, due to the COVID-19 pandemic. The conference theme was "Military Sciences vs. Open Sciences." An asynchronous online phase preceded the conference on October 13–26. Keynote speakers included Dr. Eeva Nyrövaara and Major General (ret.) Dr. Pertti Salminen.
- 2019, November 18–20: The eleventh annual ISMS conference was hosted by the Austrian National Defence Academy in Vienna, Austria, under the theme "Building Military Science for the Benefit of Society." The conference featured approximately 140 participants and ten working groups. The conference programme listed 97 presentations across 21 panels, including 94 oral and three poster presentations. The opening plenary featured Brigadier General Dr. Wolfgang Peischel of the Austrian National Defence Academy, Lieutenant Colonel Dr. Anders McD Sookermany of the Norwegian Defence University College, and Professor Christian Stadler of the University of Vienna. Selected contributions and working group reports were subsequently published in Building Military Science for the Benefit of Society, edited by Wolfgang Peischel and Christoph Bilban (2020).
- 2018, October 18–19: The tenth annual ISMS conference was hosted by War Studies University in Warsaw, Poland. The conference marked the Society's tenth anniversary and was themed "Military Sciences and Future Security Challenges." The conference programme included four parallel working group sessions and a poster session. The conference was preceded by a meeting of the Commandants and Rectors of member institutions on October 17, at which a revised Charter for the Society was adopted. The conference program display 85 presentations in four parallel Working Group sessions totaling 26 panels with 82 oral presentations and one poster session with 3 poster presentations.
- 2017, November 15–17: The ninth annual ISMS conference was hosted by the Norwegian Defence University College in Oslo, Norway, under the theme "Military Sciences – The Backbone of Military Educational Institutions?" The conference programme comprised 103 presentations across the Society's nine working groups, including 86 oral presentations in 23 panels and 17 poster presentations. Approximately 150 participants from more than 25 countries across five continents attended the conference. The keynote speaker was Professor Janne Haaland Matlary of the University of Oslo, who also held an adjunct professorship at the Norwegian Defence University College.
- 2016, October 12–14: The eight annual ISMS conference was hosted by the War Studies University in Warsaw, Poland. The conference was themed "Influence and War - Fighting for Minds". The conference program show that there were 28 panels divided among 10 working groups with a total of 95 presentations. Keynote speaker was Doctor Rafal Brzeski a journalist with 40 years of experience specializing in international relations.
- 2015, October 13–15: The seventh annual ISMS conference was hosted by the Finnish National Defence University in Helsinki, Finland. The theme of the conference was "(R)evolution of War". The conference had 66 extended abstracts and 18 full papers and about 170 participants from 21 nations.
- 2014, October 21–23: The sixth annual ISMS conference was hosted by the Austrian National Defence Academy in Vienna, Austria. The theme for the conference was "Armed Forces for 2020 and beyond – Roles | Tasks | Expectations". The Book of Abstracts show that there were 60 abstracts divided among 9 working groups. Tentative key note speakers will include Lt.-Gen. Wolfgang Wosolsobe, Director-General, EU Military Staff.
- 2013, November 12–14: The fifth annual ISMS conference was hosted by the Royal Danish Defence College in Copenhagen, Denmark. The conference was themed "Adapting to Change" and was attended by more than 150 scholars and military practitioners from around the world. The keynote speakers included Dr Matthew Burrows, National Intelligence Council and principal author of the NIC-report "Global Trends 2030", and the former Minister of Defense from the Republic of Estonia, Jaak Aaviksoo.
- 2012, October 23–24: The fourth annual ISMS conference was hosted by the Royal Military College of Canada in Kingston, Ontario. The ISMS covered all aspects of military and security studies. The theme of the conference was: “Balancing domestic and international security requirement”, focusing in particular on the high north, civil-military relations and budget austerity. Presenters featured researchers, operationally experienced military personnel and policy makers. Both days started with a plenary session, followed by multiple working group sessions and the opportunity to exchange knowledge and experience with other researchers and participants. The conference program show that there were 24 panels divided among 9 working groups with a total of 85 presentations.
- 2011, November 8–10: The third annual ISMS conference was hosted by the Baltic Defence College in Tartu, Estonia. The theme was "Adapting to Modern Security Challenges." Keynote speakers were the Lithuanian Air Force Commander Major General Edvartas Mažeikis and Dr. Jaak Aaviksoo, Estonian Minister of Education and Research. The closing summary was made by Professor Žaneta Ozoliņa of the University of Latvia.
- 2010, November 10–11: The second annual ISMS Conference was hosted by the Swedish National Defence College in Stockholm, Sweden. The theme was the need for further cooperation in defence related research projects. During the conference, scientists and scholars presented and discussed their research on Military Education; State Violence; Challenges facing small states in relation to security and defence; The future of Crisis Management; Gender and violence; and Defence technology – management and development in smaller states.
- 2009, November 25–26: The first annual ISMS conference was hosted by the Netherlands Defence Academy, at the Naval Barracks in Amsterdam, the Netherlands. The theme was “Security in 2020 in a Multi-Polar World”. During the conference, scientists and scholars presented and discussed their research on conflict and warfare, ranging from the present conflict in Afghanistan to intelligence, military technology, and personnel management. Keynote speakers were Major-General (ret.) Patrick Cammaert, 2005-2007 Force Commander of the UN Mission to the Eastern Democratic Republic of the Congo (MONUC), Prof. Dr. Franz Kernic of the Swedish National Defence College and Dr. S.J.G. Reyn of the Policy Planning Staff, Dutch Ministry of Defence.

== ISMS Working Groups ==
The ISMS Working Groups are communities of research interest, which disseminate knowledge within the community, and organize seminars at the annual conference.

- WG#1: War Studies
- WG#2: Military History
- WG#3: Military Technology
- WG#4: Leadership, Command and Control and Basic Competences
- WG#5: Law and Ethics
- WG#6: Security and Defence Policy
- WG#7: Armed Forces and Defence Management
- WG#8: Defence Management and Economics
- WG#9: Military Education
- WG#10: Strategy

== Academic Work ==
The Council of the International Society of Military Sciences has formally given its scholarly support to the effort of putting together an OpenAccess Handbook of Military Sciences. The handbooks Editor-in-Chief Anders McD Sookermany and three of the Section Editors are Council Members of the ISMS: David M. Last, Wolfgang Peischel and Niels Bo Poulsen. Several of the identified authors of the approximately 60 chapter book are affiliated with the ISMS either through their military educational institution or have presented papers at the annual ISMS conference.

== Sources ==
- Official website
- Group: International Society of Military Sciences
- Swiss Federal Institute of Technology Zürich
- Official twitter account
