= Ton van Osch =

LtGen A.G.D. van Osch
- Born: 1955 (age 70–71)
- Military career
- Allegiance: The Netherlands
- Branch: Royal Netherlands Army
- Service years: since 1978
- Rank: Lieutenant General
- Commands: Director General of the European Union Military Staff
- Conflicts: Stabilisation Force (SFOR)

Lieutenant General A.G.D. (Ton) van Osch (born 1955) is a senior Dutch military commander and past Director General of the European Union Military Staff.

== Military career ==
Van Osch joined the Royal Netherlands Military Academy in 1974 and was commissioned as an artillery officer in 1978. After various appointments, including battery command and assignments within infantry, he attended Staff Course in 1986–87 and subsequently served as a long term planner on the Army Staff.

Van Osch attended the United States Army Command and General Staff College, followed by a tour as a Lieutenant Colonel and lecturer in strategy at the Netherlands Defence College, during which time he also studied at Leiden University for a master's degree in Public Administration.

His command of 41 Field Artillery Battalion in Germany, from 1993–95, was followed by a planning post with the Defense Staff and the appointment as Head of Operational Policy and Training on the Army Staff. In 1999, during the Kosovo conflict, Van Osch became Chief Ops (Land) at HQ SFOR and also acted as Chief of the Combined Joint Operations Center during this period. Subsequently, he was appointed as Head of Policy Development for the Directorate of Personnel and Organization of the Royal Netherlands Army.

Directly after 9/11 he was sent to US Central Command, Tampa, as an operational planner for the conflict in Afghanistan.

In June 2002 Van Osch was promoted to Brigadier General and took over the post of Director of Operations in the Dutch Ministry of Defence. During this period, The Netherlands acted as lead nation in MND-SW in Bosnia, lead nation for Task Force Fox in the Former Yugoslav Republic of Macedonia and deployed the German-Netherlands HQ to Afghanistan. In March 2003 he became the Deputy Chief of Defense Staff for International Planning and Co-operation. In addition, he became the project manager for the integration of the policy headquarters of the services in the MoD.

In December 2004 he took over as Commander of the Royal Military Academy with responsibility for the integration of all officer education of the services within the newly formed Netherlands Higher Defense Academy, of which he became its first commandant.

In June 2007, Lt Gen van Osch was appointed as the Military Representative of The Netherlands to the EU and NATO in Brussels. In May 2009 he was elected to become the new Director General of the EU Military Staff as of 28 May 2010. He was succeeded in this capacity by Wolfgang Wosolsobe as of 28 May 2013.

== Personal life ==
Lieutenant General Van Osch is married and has two daughters.

Military offices
Preceded by Lt Gen David Leakey	Director General of the European Union Military Staff; 2010–2013	Succeeded by Lt Gen Wolfgang Wosolsobe
