= Prussian Staff College =

Former general staff officer school in the Kingdom of Prussia

Coordinates: 52°31′03″N 13°22′53″E

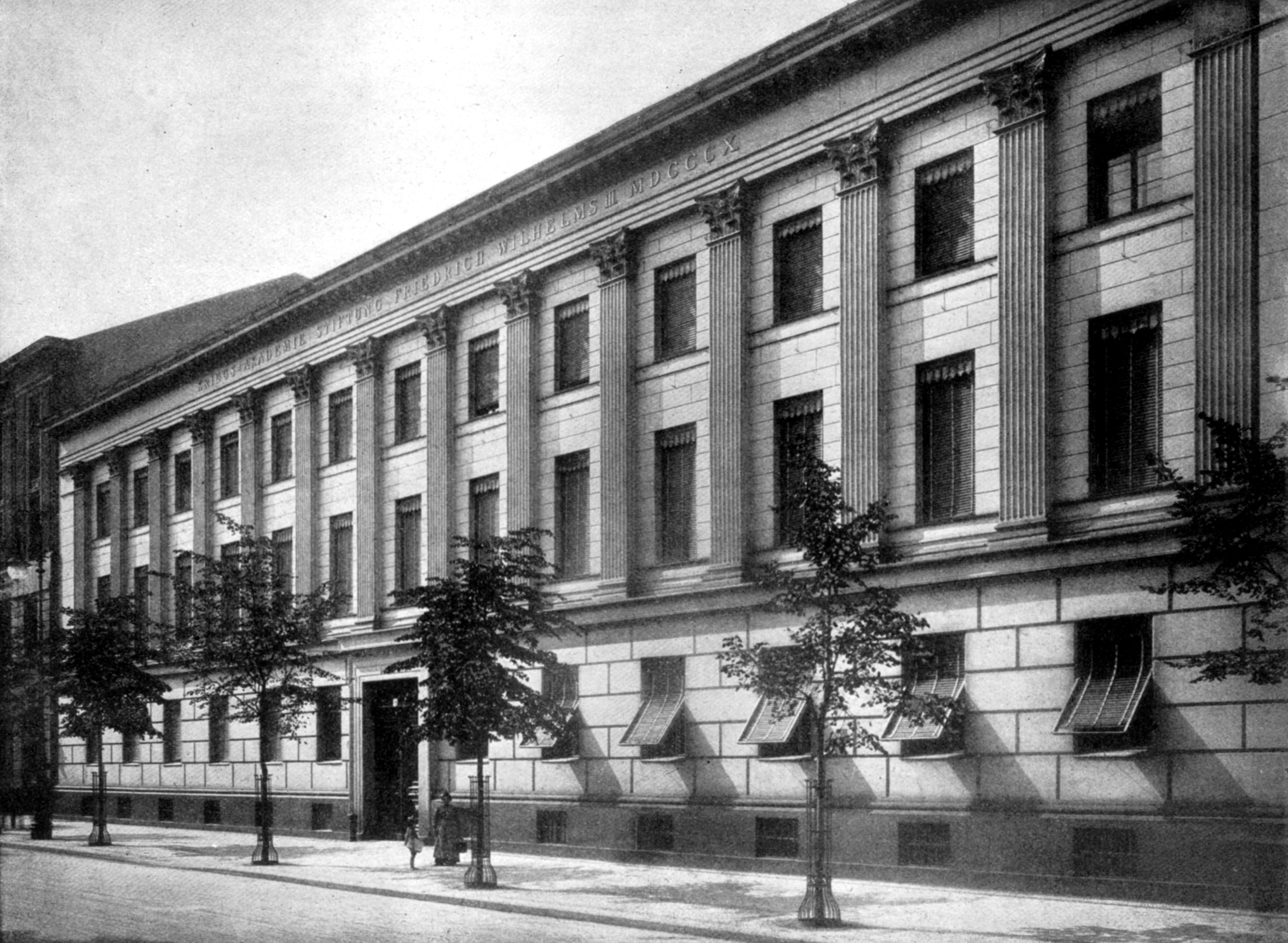
Facade of 74 Unter den Linden, constructed 1845/25 by Karl Friedrich Schinkel when it was the United Artillery and Engineering School

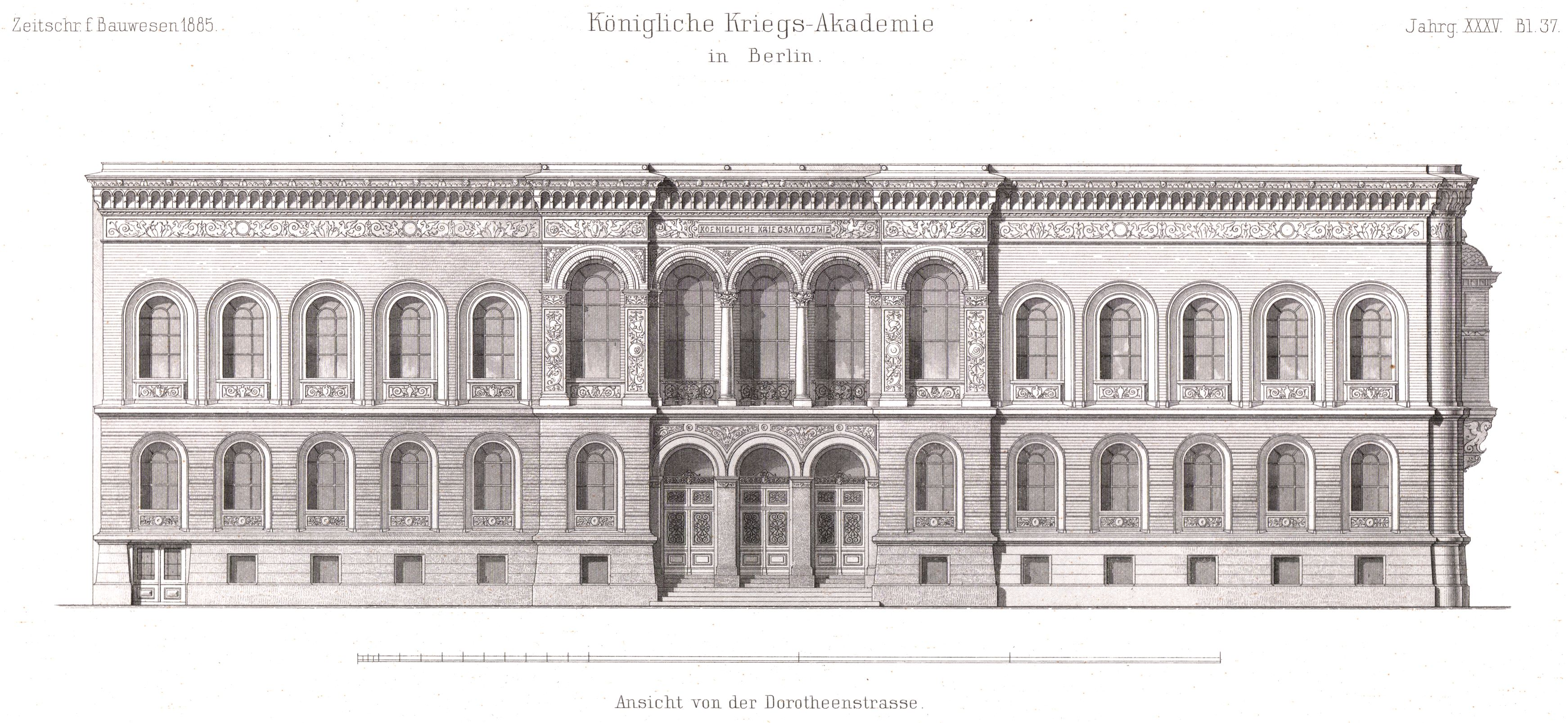
Facade of 58/59 Dorotheenstraße designed by Franz Schwechten (1883)

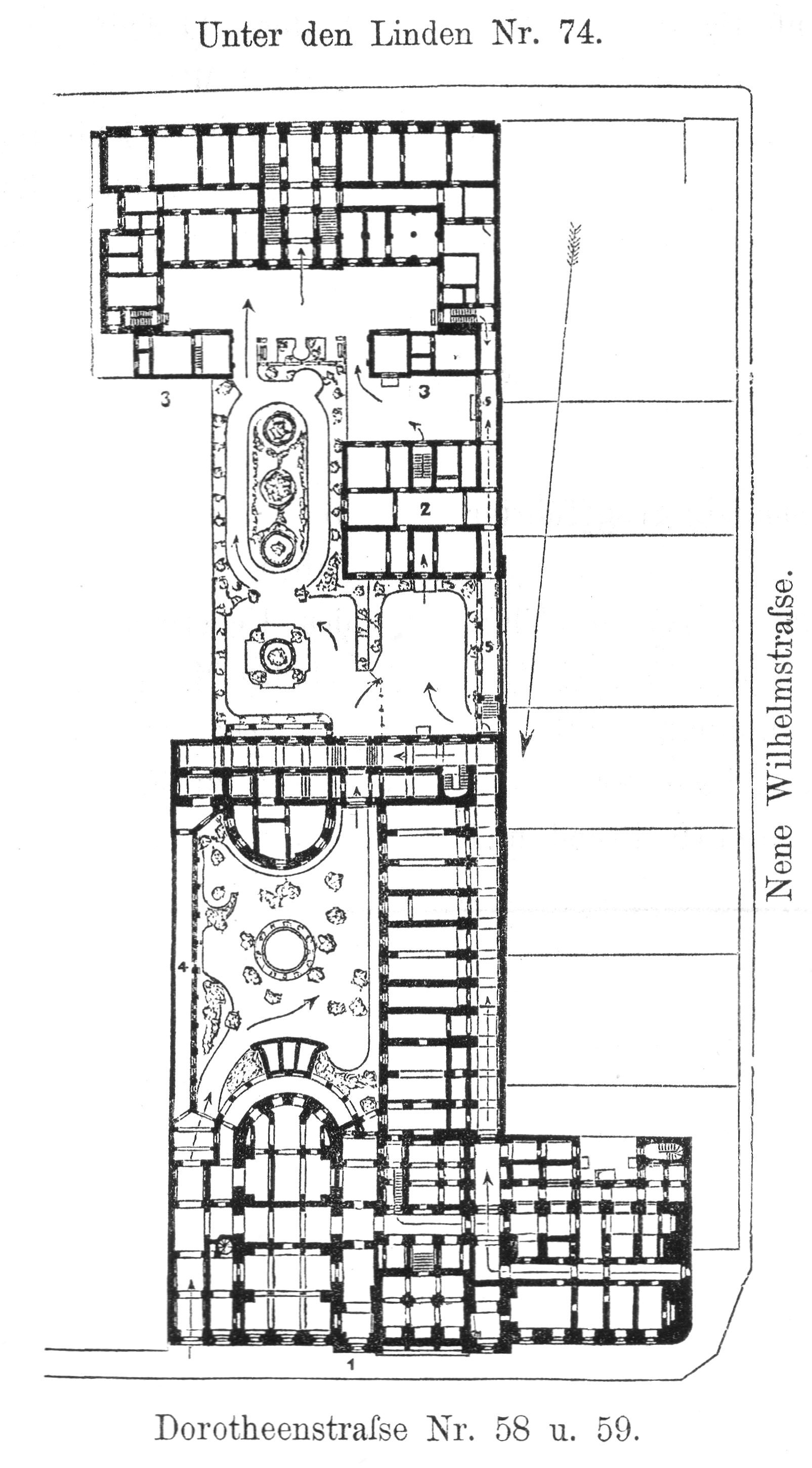
Floorplan of the War Academy with the lecture halls on Dorotheenstrasse, and the section on Unter den Linden that was converted into official residences in 1878/79 due to its prestigious location

The Prussian Staff College, also Prussian War College (German: Preußische Kriegsakademie) was the highest military facility of the Kingdom of Prussia to educate, train, and develop general staff officers.

== History ==
It originated with the Akademie für junge Offiziere der Infanterie und Kavallerie (Academy for young Officers of the Infantry and Cavalry) in 1801, later becoming known as the Allgemeine Kriegsschule (General War-School). It was officially re-founded by Gerhard von Scharnhorst in Berlin on October 15, 1810 as one of three officer colleges. Its building on Unter den Linden (1845/25), Berlin, was designed by Karl Friedrich Schinkel.

Graduation from the Staff College was a prerequisite for appointment to the Prussian General Staff (later the German General Staff). Carl von Clausewitz enrolled as one of its first students in 1801 (before it was renamed), while other attendees included Field Marshals von Steinmetz, von Moltke, and von Blumenthal in the 1820s and 1830s.

Ernst Emile Von Lorenz, who served as a United States Army Commander in 1889, was a graduate, as was US Army Colonel Albert Coady Wedemeyer, who served in World War II. The Staff College and the system of General Staff were forbidden to Germany after World War I according to the terms of the Treaty of Versailles, and its campus was repurposed for civilian institutions. In 1935 Hitler was in attendance to reopen the Academy on its new Moabit campus on Kruppstrasse.

== Curriculum ==
Students at the War Academy attended about 20 hours of lectures per week. Instruction was by professors from Berlin University and officers serving on the Great General Staff, who thereby enhanced their own educations. In 1872 the War Academy was taken from the Inspector of Military Education and placed under the Chief of the General Staff. The spirit of the Academy was articulated by Chief of Staff Helmuth von Moltke, who emphasized the importance "of an active process of mental give and take between teacher and pupils, so as to stimulate the pupils to become fellow-workers".

Admission to the Academy was highly selective. Officers with at least five years service who wanted to become General Staff officers prepared themselves for the entrance examination, which included tactics, surveying, geography, mathematics and French, with questions set to test understanding rather than rote memory. The graders of the essays did not know the names or regiments of the candidates. From hundreds of applicants, about one hundred were accepted every year to enter the first-year course at the Academy. Those who performed satisfactorily were promoted to the second and third year.

In the first year, fourteen hours of lectures each week were focused on military subjects, including military history, while seventeen hours were non-military, which included general history, mathematics, science and a choice of French or Russian. Roughly the same time allocations were used in the last two years. Lectures were supplemented by visits to fortifications, arms factories and exercises of the railway regiment. During the three month summer breaks the students attended manoeuvres and were taken on field tactical exercises in which they commanded imaginary units. At the end of the course they took their second examination. Only about thirty students passed this extremely difficult test. They were then assigned (kommandiert) to the Great General Staff, while retaining their regimental attachments. After two years they took their third and final examination, after which five to eight officers were permanently posted to fill vacancies in the General Staff — a remarkable winnowing from the many who had entered the competition.

== Dissolution ==
The Allied Control Council Law No. 46 liquidated the State of Prussia on 25 February 1947, including the Academy. The Schinkel building fronting Unter den Linden and Dorotheenstrasse was a complete loss, but the campus on Kruppstrasse was repaired to serve in administration and law enforcement.

== See also ==
- Bundeswehr Command and Staff College, which was established in 1957 as the successor of the Prussian Military Academy
- Command and General Staff College -- United States
- Staff College, Camberley -- United Kingdom
- General Staff Academy -- Imperial Russia
- Army War College -- Imperial Japan
- École Supérieure de Guerre -- France
- Kara Harp Okulu -- Turkey
- List of government-run higher-level national military academies
