= Ground Force Command College =

Military college in Nanjing, Jiangsu, China

Coordinates: 32.1737°N 118.6655°E

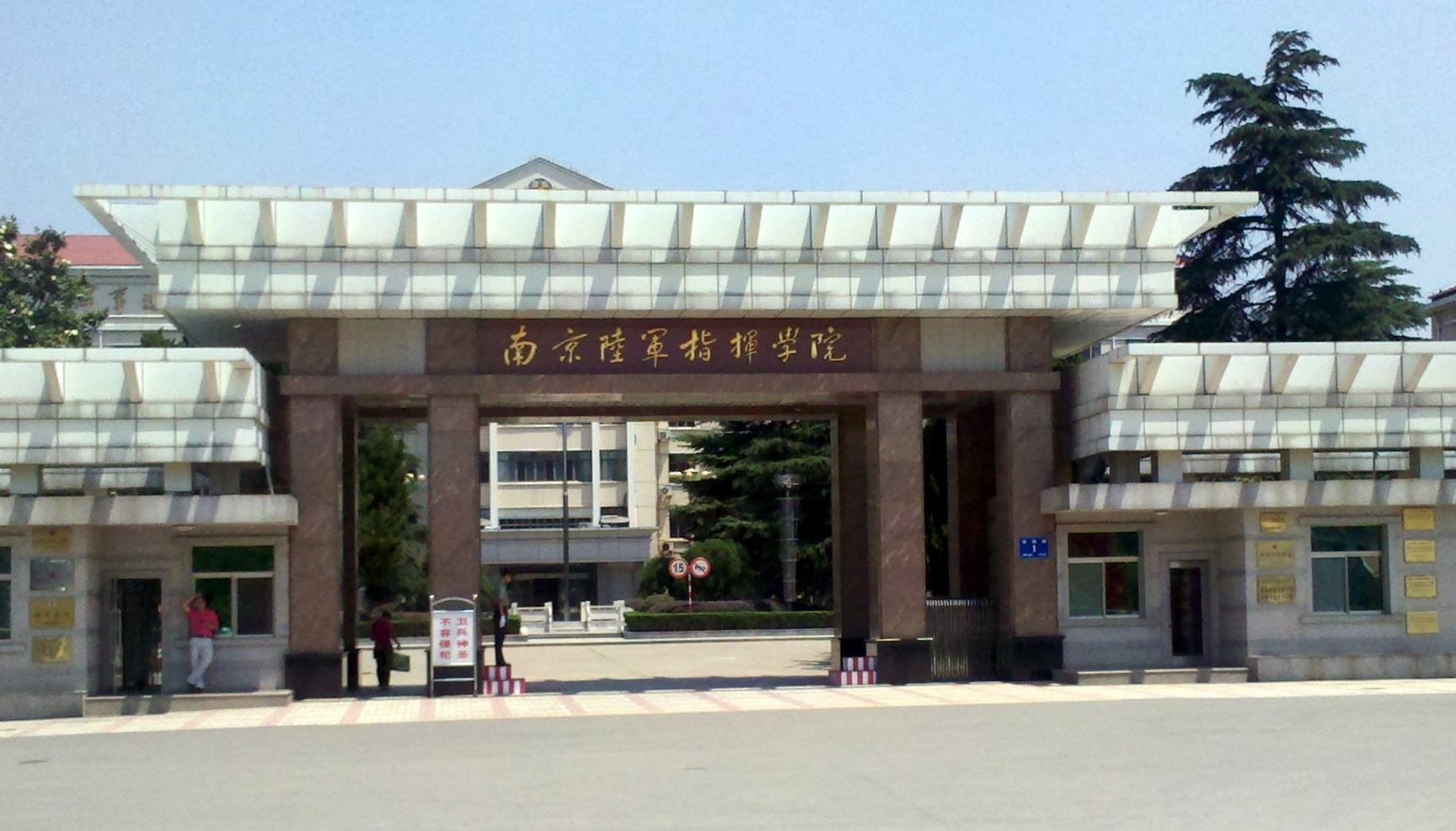
The gate of college.

The Ground Force Command College (中国人民解放军陆军指挥学院) is a professional military education college in Nanjing, Jiangsu, China. It is affiliated with the People's Liberation Army Ground Force.

The college serves as a command academy that trains army commanders in the People's Liberation Army Ground Force. The college is among the most esteemed military academies in China. Since 1957, it has undertaken the task of providing long-term military training to foreign officers.

== History ==
The college traces its history back to the East China Military and Political University, which was abolished on November 28, 1950. On January 27, 1974, the Nanjing Military Region decided to build a Military and Political Cadre School based in the Pukou, Nanjing. The opening ceremony was held on April 19, 1976. In January 1978, the Central Military Commission ordered the Nanjing Military Region Military and Political Cadre School to be upgraded and transformed into the Nanjing Advanced Infantry School. In December 1980, it was renamed the Nanjing Advanced Army School.

In July 1986, it was renamed the PLA Army Command Academy. In 1999, it was renamed the Nanjing Army Command College, being a key construction academy in the third phase of the "2110 Project" of military academies. In 2016, the school was transferred from the PLA General Staff Department to the PLAGF. The following year, in connection with the reforms of 2015, the school was renamed to the Army Command College.

== Students ==
The college is known to host exchange students from foreign countries such as Azerbaijan, The Gambia, South Korea and Pakistan. The college oversees the International Military Education Exchange Center (IMEEC).

=== Notable alumni ===
- Fan Changmi, Deputy Political Commissar of the Lanzhou Military Region until he was placed under investigation for corruption in 2014.
- Hikmat Hasanov, commander of the 1st Army Corps (Azerbaijan)

== See also ==
- Academic institutions of the armed forces of China
- List of government-run higher-level national military academies
- Army Medical University
