= War College (Finland) =

- Sotakorkeakoulu
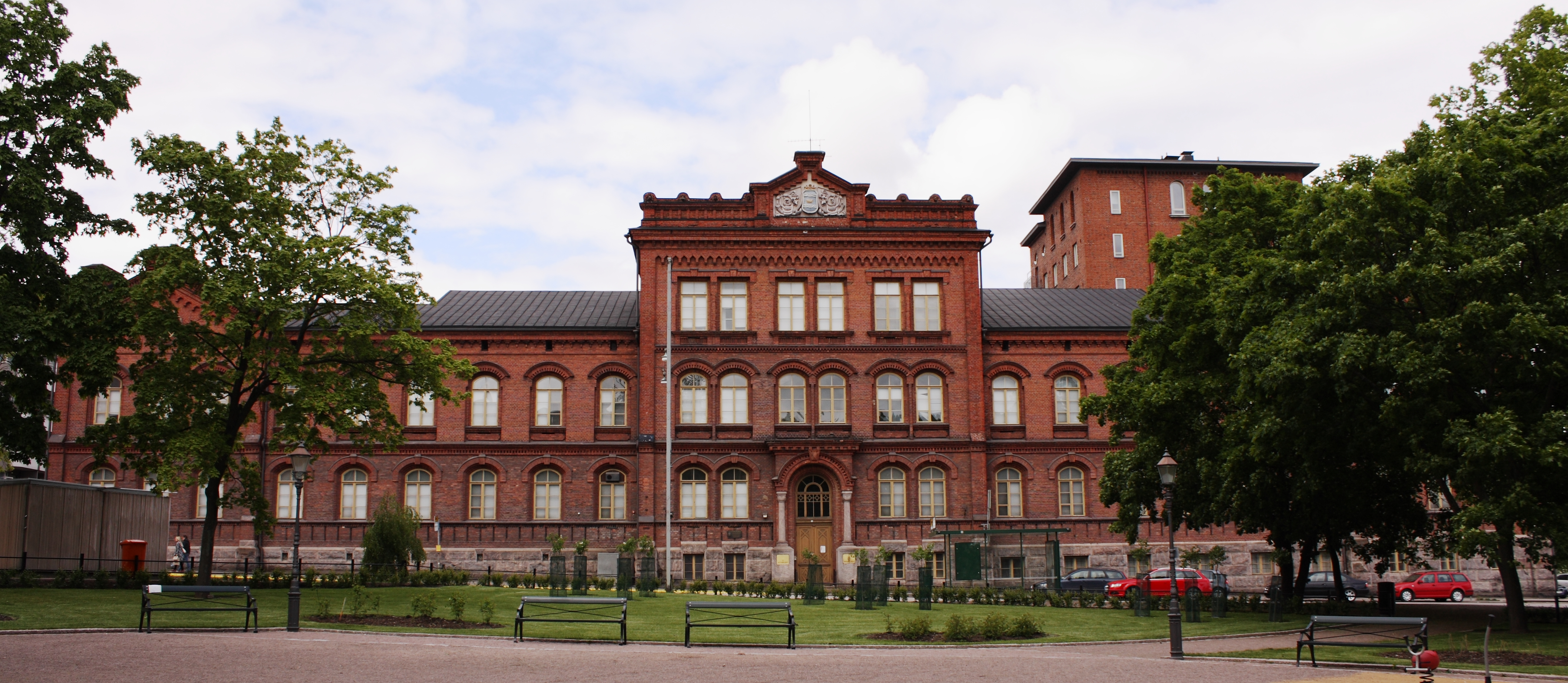
- Original building of the War College
- Active: 1924–1992
- Country: Finland
- Type: War college
- March: Juhlamarssi

War College (Finnish: Sotakorkeakoulu, abbreviated SKK) is a Finnish war college, nowadays the senior part of the National Defence University. The college was an independent organisation from 1924 to 1992. Founded first as a temporary institute, it was made permanent in 1930. At the end of 1992, it was merged with the Cadet School (Finnish: Kadettikoulu) and the Battle School (Finnish: Taistelukoulu) into the National Defence University.

During its existence, the War College provided general staff officer education for officers of the Finnish military, continuing education for staff officers who had already graduated, and courses for top decision makers of the Finnish society. Starting from 1980s, it also housed the Department of Military Science, and under it the Office of Military History and the Military Museum of Finland.

== History ==
Officer training in Finland goes back to 1779, when Georg Magnus Sprengtporten proposed to Gustav III that a military school would be founded in Rantasalmi. The proposal was accepted in 1780, and the school building completed in 1781. The school was the first institution to train army officers in any of the Nordic countries. Teaching was stopped in 1788 due to Russo-Swedish War of 1788–1790, but the institute resumed teaching in 1791 as an officer cadet school. The school was viewed as neutral ground by both parties during the Finnish War and following the Russian victory, a Field Measurement School was set up at the same location in 1812. In 1819, the school was moved to Hamina and became the Finnish Cadet School. Following the Finnish independence and the Finnish Civil War, the Finnish army had a shortage of officers. The initial plans were for a Sotakoulu (lit. 'War School'), that would give one-year courses to train between 500 and 1000 new officers per year. Next, a system of sending officers to Germany for schooling was considered. In the end, an independent Finnish Cadet School was settled upon, and began teaching in 1919.

=== Founding ===
A Finnish War College was first proposed by the Finnish General Headquarters in August 1918, following the end of the Finnish Civil War which had broken out soon after Finland declared independence from Russia in 1917. This initial proposal was for an institute providing relatively short, 6 to 9 months long, courses that would be mandatory for all officers who had obtained three years of practical experience. In January 1919, the government both granted the proposed institute funding, and appointed Hannes Ignatius as the inspector of war schools, a role which also entailed command of the War College. While these actions technically "found" the War College, they did not materialize anything practical, and the role of inspector of war schools was disbanded in April 1920. Instead, in late 1919 Finnish officers were sent to France for continued education.

An effort to found a War College was renewed in 1922, with both Harald Öhquist and the board of the Jäger Union approaching the Chief of Defence about general staff officer education. As a result, in April 1923, the government appointed a three-man committee to study a potential War College. The committee consisted of Carl Enckell, Hannes Ignatius and Armas-Eino Martola, with Enckell acting as the chair. While the committee members initially disagreed whether the War College should be a temporary or permanent institute, (Note: The argument for a temporary institute being that following a surge of students in the first years, later students cohorts could be educated more cheaply in France.) they submitted their report already at the end of May calling for a permanent War College to be established. According to their proposal, the War College would provide all higher military education in Finland, starting with an intake of 30 officers in a two-year general staff officer course and 10 officers in a one-year course for unit commanders. The college would also provide military scientific training for engineering and artillery engineering officers. The War College was seen as a way to improve the Finnish Army, advance Finnish military and military scientific literature, and allow the army to formulate its own tactics and strategies.

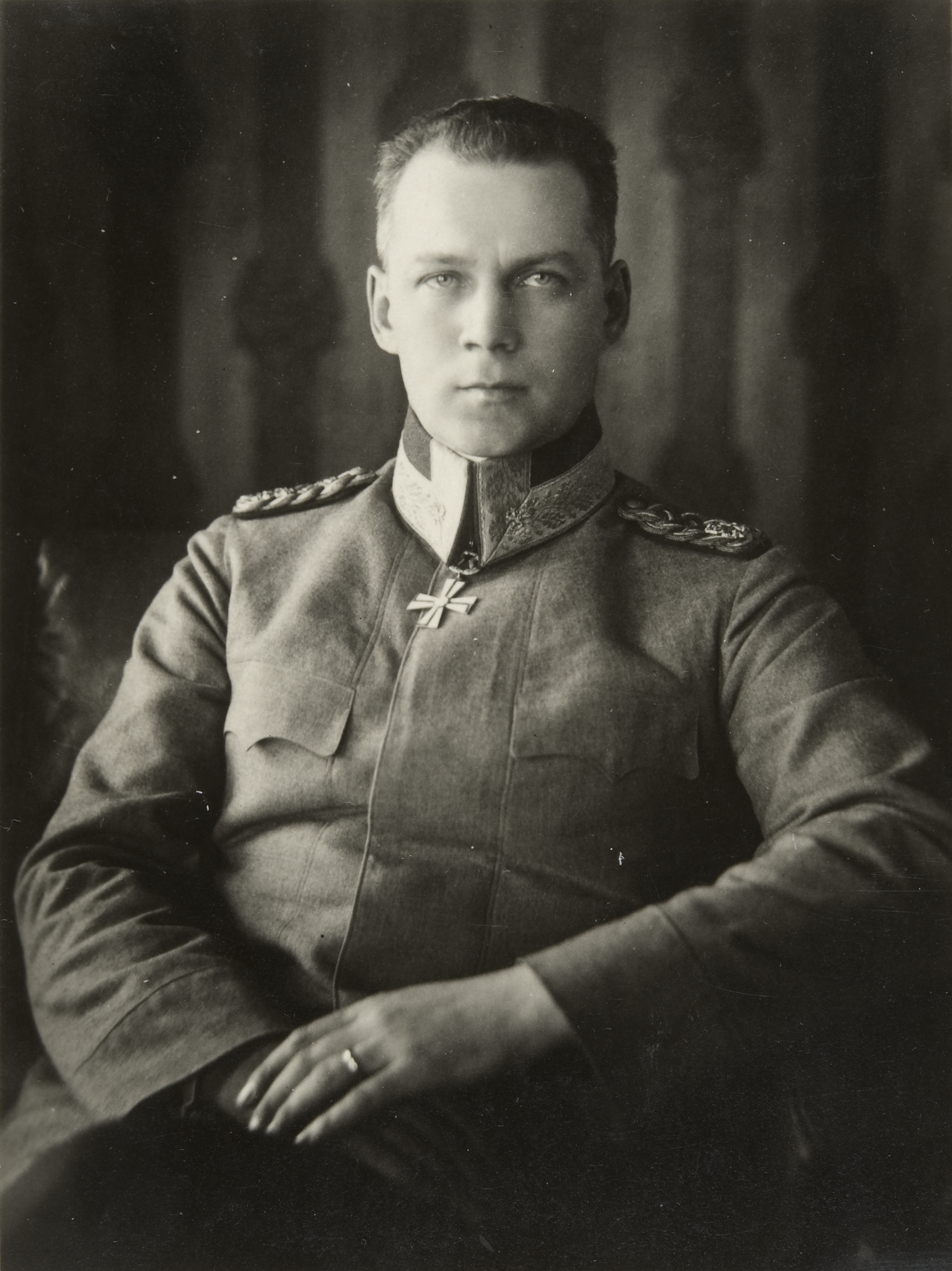
Aarne Sihvo, photographed either 1925 or 1926

The War College proposal was next pushed forwards in April 1924 when Eirik Hornborg, chairman of a Defence Revision Committee that was considering Finnish defence more holistically, approached the minister of defence with a letter calling for War College to be established as soon as possible. The government proposed a budget for a War College three weeks later. However, during the parliamentary process, the college was turned into a temporary institute, set up only to the end of 1930.

A presidential decree signed on 3 October 1924 defined that the War College was to provide higher military scientific education for active-duty officers on two tracks, the first of which was a two-year general studies track. The second track was a four-year military technical track, which included two years of studies in the Helsinki University of Technology. The first officers had indeed already started their studies in the Helsinki University of Technology 1923, when the War College was still a proposal. A separate military decree by the president, also signed on 3 October 1924, appointed Colonel Aarne Sihvo as the head of the War College. However, because Sihvo was at the time studying in Italy, the task was first taken up by the inspector of artillery, Major General Vilho Petter Nenonen. The first deputy head of the college was Major Armas-Eino Martola, who was also the first teacher of the college.

The first cohort of 34 students began their studies on 3 November 1924 in the old barracks of the Uusimaa Sharpshooter Battalion, at Liisankatu 1, Helsinki. During an opening ceremony, Nenonen vocalized the mission of the War College as two-fold: it would not only provide its students with a broad military scientific education, but also develop a truly Finnish military doctrine.

=== Pre-war years ===
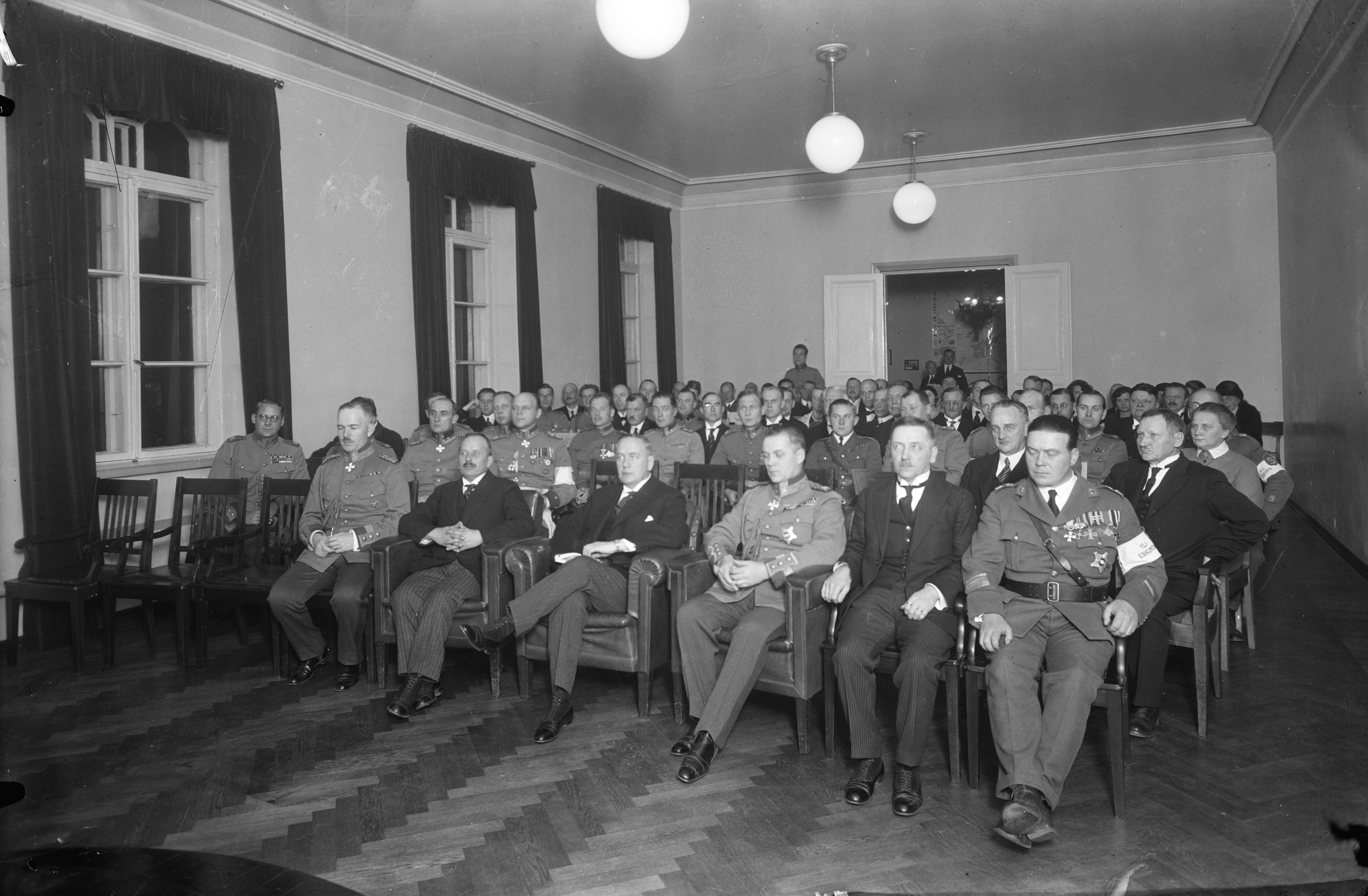
Anniversary of the War College, 1931.

The initial teaching staff was largely from abroad (namely Sweden, Italy, France and England), with Finns (other than Martola) acting only as hourly teachers. As a consequence, much of the early teaching was in languages other than Finnish. It took until 1927 before all teaching staff was Finnish.

Various lines of study were launched over time, starting with the general studies section. The military technical section began teaching in October 1925, the naval warfare section in the fall of 1927 and the air warfare section in 1937. These early years also saw the introduction of an entrance exam for prospective students.

In late 1920s, it was observed that the amount of graduates would be wholly insufficient for the needs of the Finnish Defence Forces even in peace-time. As such, in 1930, a modification to the relevant laws made the War College a permanent institute, allowing long-term development of the institution. The lengths of the courses were also in flux at the time, with especially the military technical section experimenting with both three and four year courses. 1933 saw the end of students being sent to the Helsinki University of Technology, as all teaching was now given by the War College.

Despite being made permanent, the college continued to attracted a limited number of students. According to the Officer's Union of Finland, a major problem with the college was that it represented a significant financial burden for the duration of the studies, while not conveying any financial benefits following their end. A total of 370 officers had graduated by the beginning of the Winter War in 1939. Of these, 265 graduated from the general section, 54 from the technical section, 38 from the naval warfare section and 13 from the air warfare section. 1939 also represented a record in student intake, with 50 new students beginning their studies.

The start of the Finno-Soviet Winter War in late 1939 caused all teaching activities in the War College to be halted. The college remained closed to the end of the Finnish participation in World War II.

=== Cold War years ===
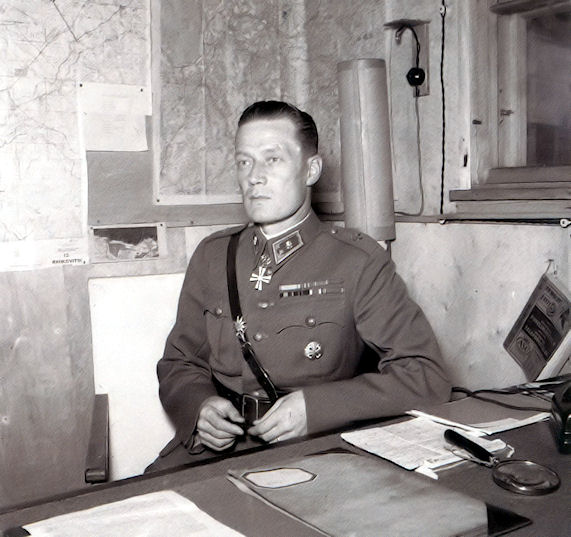
Major General Kustaa Tapola, first post-war commander of the War College.

The War College resumed limited activities in the summer of 1945, when it awarded diplomas to students who had been in the middle of their studies when the Winter War broke out. Teaching resumed on 7 January 1946, with a fresh intake of 38 students. This first intake of students deviated from the norm in that the participants were detailed into the school without having to take an entrance exam. Their courses were also shortened to only a single year of "boarding school style" education. These students were also all allocated to the general studies section and the military technical section, with the naval and aerial warfare sections remaining closed.

Normal teaching resumed with the intake of 1947. The incoming students were met by a new sectional structure, which consisted of a general studies section, a naval warfare section, an aerial warfare section, an engineering section, a signals section and a logistics section. This division was again modified in 1949, organizing the students under two sections (general and military technical) which contained various lines of study.

The post-war years also saw an increase in student intake compared to the 1930s. For example, the 1948 entrance exams were attended by 121 applicants, of whom 78 were accepted into the college.

A 1955 review of graduation numbers revealed that the numbers of graduates from various lines of study were misaligned with the needs of the military. Most notably, the land warfare line of study was producing too few graduates, while the naval and aerial warfare lines were producing too many. As a result, the student intake process was modified so that a new cohort of students began their studies in the land warfare line every year, while the aerial and naval warfare lines only took in new students in turns every other year.

In 1960, the War College began organizing national defence courses, the first of which was held in 1961. These approximately three-week courses, attended by top decision makers of the Finnish society, discuss "timely issues relevant to Finnish security policy and national defence" with a goal of "improving the co-operation of various sectors of the society during emergency conditions". The courses are based on the concept of total defence and include teaching, discussions and exercises on the basics of security policy and national defence, economic national defence, national defence publicity, military national defence, civil defence and similar matters. By 1993, a total of 4833 people had attended the courses, over 85 % of whom were civilians.

The War College also provided continuing education for general staff officers. For example, courses preparing officers for intelligence work began in 1957. Starting from 1968, general staff officers who had completed their general staff studies at least five years prior were offered 8-week courses aimed to give their participants the prerequisite skills to act as, for example, commander of an independent units or as a head of division in the Defence Command.

Further change came in 1985, when the Department of Military Science was merged into the War College. The department included, among others, the Office of Military History, the Military Museum of Finland, the Military Archive of Finland, and the Central Library of Military Science.

=== Part of National Defence University ===
Investigations into the efficacy of the Finnish officer training system had been a constant since the founding of the War College, with first proposals for combining the various officer training institutions going back to at least the 1930s. Following the work of several working groups in the 1980s, in December 1990, the War College was ordered to draft a proposal for the composition and mission of a National Defence University. The need for the merger was motivated by desire to provide better coordination and use of resources in officer training. War College's proposal presented a structure consisting of the War College and the Cadet School under the rector of the National Defence University. This proposal, however, was rejected as requiring too much personnel.

A revised organizational structure was approved by the President of Finland in July 1992, and came to effect on 1 January 1993. The restructuring merged the War College with Battle School and Cadet School to form the National Defence University. The merger process drew the attention of the Chancellor of Justice, when it came to light that the Ministry of Defence had formally disestablished the existing schools without waiting for the relevant law on the new institute to pass the parliament.

The War College continued its work as the "Post-graduate degree department" Finnish: Jatkotutkinto-osasto. In 2003, the first doctors of military science graduated from its doctoral program. Nowadays, the doctoral program is an established institution that produces 2–6 new doctors of military science yearly. In 2025, the department received its historical name War College, Sotakorkeakoulu.

== Heraldry and traditions ==
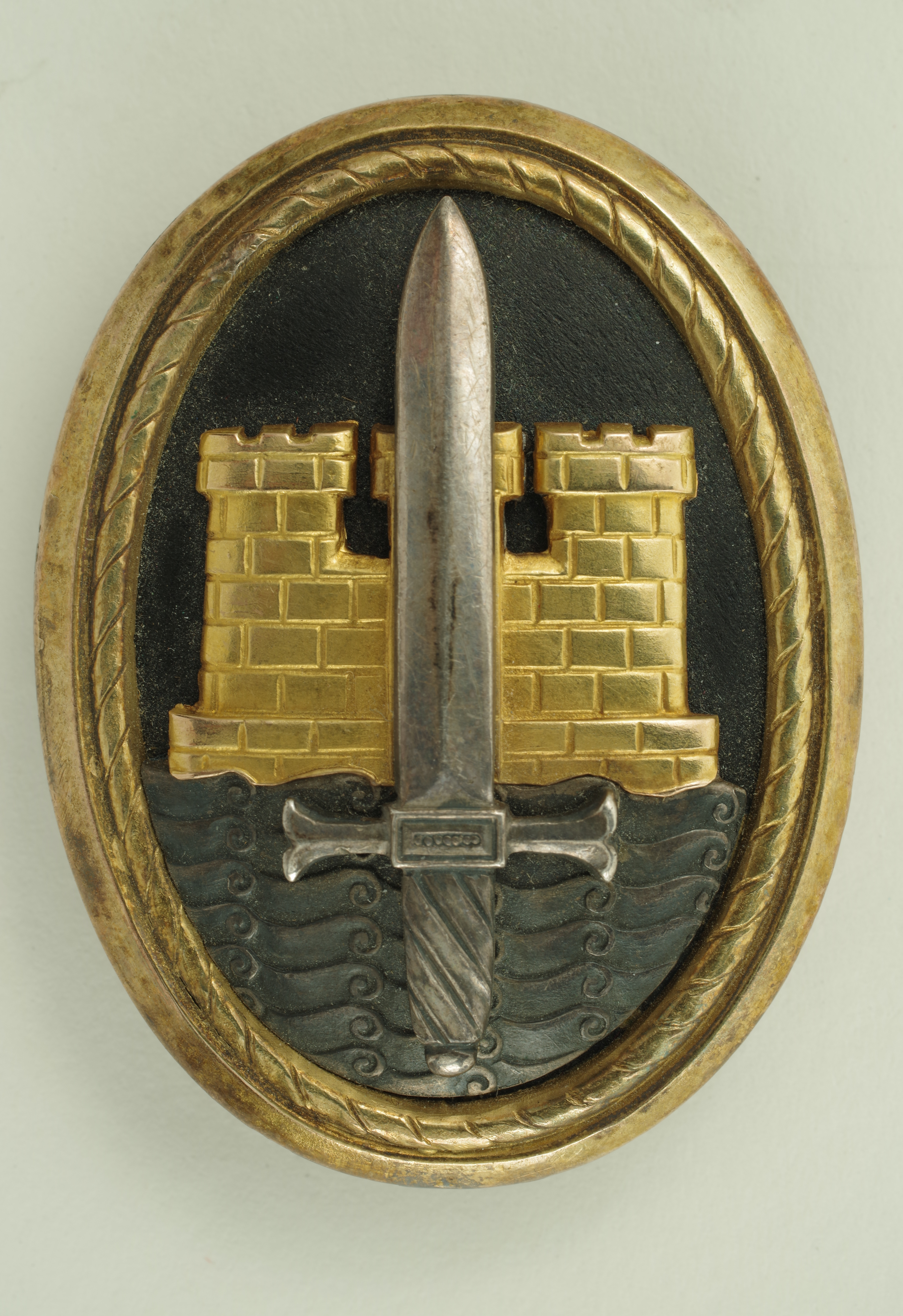
Course badge of the War College

In 1928, the anniversary of the War Collage was set as 11 April based on the 11 April 1610 founding of Nyenschantz by Charles IX of Sweden. In 1949, the anniversary of the War College was modified to be 15 January, based on the date of the first general staff officer course starting.

A 1928 design competition for a general staff officer course badge was won by a vertical oval designed by Artturi Brummer-Korvenkontio. The badge shows a silver sword, tip upwards, overlaid on a three-towered golden crenelated castle symbolizing Nyenschantz. The castle stands on silver waves with a background of enamel, symbolizing steel armor plate. A golden rim decorates the edge of the badge. A unit badge based on the same design was approved for use with uniforms in 1935.

The War College command course, major course and logistics staff officer course were granted a right to use the badge of the Battle School sometime after 1957. The oval badge is decorated by a golden rim of spruce twigs, with a golden Lion of Finland (absent roses) on a field of matte black in the center.

Armas Maasalo's Juhlamarssi (lit. 'Festive March') was designated as the official march of the War College on 24 February 1978. It replaced Robert Kajanus's Sotamarssi (lit. 'War March'). Maasalo's work, originally titled simply Marssi (lit. 'March') had been previously dedicated to the Helsinki Jäger Brigade in 1918.

The flag of the War College was approved in 1968. It depicted a golden Lion of Finland (absent roses) on a purplish red field, with the castle-and-sword icon of the course badge (in gold and silver) in the upper left corner. The flag remains in use as a heritage flag.

== Notable staff ==
- Vilho Nenonen, commander 1924–1925
- Armas-Eino Martola, assistant to commander, 1924–1925
- Aarne Sihvo, commander 1925–1926
- Karl Lennart Oesch, commander 1926–1929
- Erik Heinrichs, commander 1929–1930
- Einar Mäkinen, assistant to commander 1926–1931
- Kustaa Tapola, commander 1945–1948

== Sources ==
- Elfvengren, Eero; Turtola, Martti (2005). "Sotahistorian tutkimus Puolustusvoimissa 80-vuotta" [80 Years of Military Historical Research in Finnish Defence Forces]. Tiede ja Ase (in Finnish). 63. Suomen Sotatieteellinen seura: 7–21.
- Karjalainen, Mikko (2018). ""Kaikin puolin kyvykäs upseeri" – eversti, mannerheim-ristin ritari Valter Nordgren" ["All-Around a Capable Officer" – Colonel, Knight of the Mannerheim Cross Valter Nordgren]. In Karjalainen, Mikko; Ahtinen, Hannu (eds.). Vihollisen taktiikasta ja omista vastatoimenpiteistä [On Enemy Tactics and Our Own Countermeasures] (in Finnish). National Defence University. ISBN 978-951-25-3056-4.
- Kurenmaa, Pekka, ed. (1994). Sotakorkeakoulusta Maanpuolustuskorkeakouluksi: Seitsemän vuosikymmentä [From War College to National Defence University: Seven Decades] (in Finnish). National Defence University. ISBN 951-25-0686-6.
- Liene, Timo (2002). Käsi kalvan kahvassa: Suomalaisen upseerikoulutuksen lyhyt historiikki [A Hand on the Handle of a Sword: A Short History of Finnish Officer Training]. Maanpuolustuskorkeakoulun historian laitoksen julkaisuja (in Finnish) (2nd, expanded ed.). National Defence University. ISBN 951-25-1397-8.
- "Tietoa meistä" [About us]. maanpuolustuskurssit.fi (in Finnish). Finnish Defence Forces. n.d.
- Palokangas, Marko, et al. (2008). Suomen Puolustusvoimien Joukko-osastoperinteet [Unit Traditions of the Finnish Defence Forces]. Sotamuseon julkaisuja (in Finnish). Vol. 1/2008. Finnish Defence Forces and Military Museum of Finland. ISBN 978-951-25-1885-2. ISSN 1239-551X.
- Seppälä, Helge (1974a). Sotakorkeakoulu 1924-1974 [War College 1924-1974] (in Finnish). ISBN 951-25-0020-5.
- Seppälä, Helge (1974b). "Suomen Sotakorkeakoulu 50-vuotias" [Finnish War College is 50 Years Old]. Tiede ja Ase (in Finnish). 32. Suomen Sotatieteellinen seura: 5–32.
- Setälä, Risto J. (1984). "Sotakorkeakoulu, tehtävät ja toiminta" [War College, Missions and Activities]. Tiede ja Ase (in Finnish). 42. Suomen Sotatieteellinen seura: 5–7.
- Tienari, Janne; Mantere, Saku; Vaara, Eero (2009). "Maanpuolustuskurssit: Foorumi strategiakeskustelulle?" [National Defence Courses: A Forum for Discussing Strategy?]. Tiede ja ase (in Finnish). 67. Suomen Sotatieteellinen seura.
- Vaahtolammi, Esko (2013). Maanpuolustuskorkeakoulu 20 vuotta: sotilasyliopiston ensiaskeleet 1993–2013 [National Defence University 20 Years: First Steps of a Military University 1993–2013] (in Finnish). National Defence University. ISBN 978-951-25-2492-1.
- Vainio, Riitta (15 January 1993). "Maanpuolustuskorkeakoulu aloitti sotilaiden koulutuksen - Korkeakouluneuvosto ei hyväksyisi opinahjoa tiedekorkeakouluksi: "Suomen upseerikoulutuksen historian suurin muutos"" [National Defence University Begins Training Soldiers – Higher Education Council Would Not Accept as a Scientific Institute of Higher Education: "Greatest Change in the History of Finnish Officer Training"]. Helsingin Sanomat (in Finnish).
- Wikström, Sven (9 July 1992a). "Kadetti ja kadettikoulu säilyvät sotilastermeinä: Hallitus hyväksyi ministeriön korjaamat asetustekstit" [Cadet and Cadet School Remain as Military Terms: Government Approves Ministry's Revised Statutes]. Helsingin Sanomat (in Finnish).
- Wikström, Sven (21 July 1992b). "Puolustusvoimain uudistus koskettaa 1500:tä henkilöä: Paikkakuntaa joutuu vaihtamaan noin 300 sotilasta" [Defence Force Reorganization Touches 1500: 300 Soldiers Forced to Move to]. Helsingin Sanomat (in Finnish).
