= Kustaa Tapola =

Finnish general (1895–1971)

Kustaa Anders Tapola
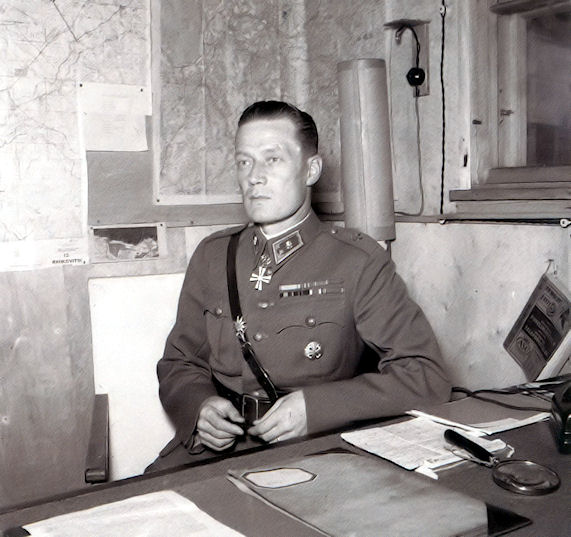
- Tapola, photographed during his time as the commander of the 5th Division.
- Born: 29 March 1895; Lempäälä, Grand Duchy of Finland, Russian Empire
- Died: 2 April 1971 (aged 76) Helsinki, Finland
- Buried: Lempäälä, Finland
- Allegiance: Finland
- Branch: Finnish Army
- Service years: 1917–1955
- Rank: General of the infantry (1955)
- Commands: 2nd Division; 5th Division (1942–1944); VI Corps (1944)
- Awards: Mannerheim Cross

Kustaa Anders Tapola (29 March 1895 – 2 April 1971) was a Finnish General of Infantry and Knight of the Mannerheim Cross. He participated in the Finnish Civil War, the Winter War and the Continuation War. In addition to commanding formations up to the size of an army corps, he held several notable staff positions, such as Army Chief-of-Staff, Chief of the General Headquarters Operations Section, Commandant of the War College, and Inspector of Military Schools and Infantry.

== Early life and Finnish Civil War ==
Kustaa Tapola was born in Lempäälä on 29 March 1895 to farmer parents Kustaa Eevert Tapola and Matilda Tapola. He graduated as an ylioppilas in 1916, and began to study medicine at the university level.

In the summer of 1917, he was involved in founding White Guard units in Häme and Satakunta, and in late December 1917, enrolled in a two-week squad and platoon leader course organized by the in Vimpeli. During the 1918 Finnish Civil War he acted initially as a trainer and a company commander, eventually being granted command of a battalion on the side of the Finnish Whites. During the civil war, he led the White forces in the battles of Urajärvi and Vierumäki.

== Military career ==
Tapola continued his military service following the civil war. From 1918 to 1926 he held postings as an adjutant to a regimental commander, as a company commander, and as the commander of a Non-commissioned officer school. During this same time period, he himself studied first in the Officer Cadet School and then in the Finnish War College. Following his graduation from the latter in 1926, he took a position as staff officer in the Finnish General Headquarters, soon promoted to chief of an office. In 1929, while at the General HQ, he was promoted to lieutenant colonel. From 1930 to 1934 Tapola served as the commander of the 2nd Division and as a chief-of-staff of a corps headquarters. In 1934 he became the commander of the Finnish Reserve Officer School. He held this posting until 1937, when he was promoted to the rank of colonel and posted, again, as a section chief in the Finnish General HQ.

During the Winter War, waged between Finland and the Soviet Union in late 1939 and early 1940, Tapola acted as the chief of staff of the Army of the Isthmus. Following the end of the war, he returned to the Finnish General HQ first as the chief-of-staff of the Finnish Army and later as chief of the General HQ Operations Section. When the Continuation War began in 1941, he took on the role of the chief-of-staff for the Army of Karelia. While in this role, he was promoted to major general on 31 December 1941. Later during the Continuation War, Tapola served first as the commander of the 5th Division from 1942 to 1944, and then briefly as the commander of the VI Corps in 1944 just prior to the end of the war. On 18 November 1944 he was awarded the Mannerheim Cross.

Following the end of the Continuation War in 1944, Tapola first commanded the Etelä-Häme Military District. The next year, in 1945, he was made the commander of the War College and the Inspector of Military Schools. From 1948 to his retirement in 1955 he was the Inspector of Infantry. During 1955, he was also promoted to general of the infantry. In 1951, he was on the flight that returned the body of Marshal Carl Gustaf Emil Mannerheim, the Finnish Continuation War and Winter War commander-in-chief, to Finland after his death.

Tapola was influential in the post-war reorganization of the Finnish Army, both increasing the civilian oversight of the armed forces and developing the regional structure of the Finnish Defence Forces. He was considered for the position of Chief of Defence multiple times, but his appointment was blocked for political reasons.

== Later years and legacy ==
Following his retirement, Tapola served as the president of the Defense Economic Planning Board, where he proposed a model which divided Finland into multiple Defense Economical Districts that would be able to act independently during crises. According to historian Ilkka Seppinen, his proposal was viewed by some of the other board members as "audacious, even reckless," causing distrust among the board members. Tapola resigned in 1958 after an amended budget proposed that the funds allocated to the planning board be instead given to the Ministry of Defence.

He was among the founders of the Military Scientific Foundation and the Military Psychological Foundation, and a military member of the Supreme Court of Finland. Tapola was also active in multiple foundations and boards, including the Foundation of the Knights of the Mannerheim Cross, the Programming Board of YLE, the Advisory Board of the Finnish Institute of Occupational Health, and the Advisory Board of the Finnish Scout Organizations. He died on 2 April 1971 in Helsinki and is buried in Lempäälä.
