= Hervé Bléjean =

French Navy officer (born 1963)

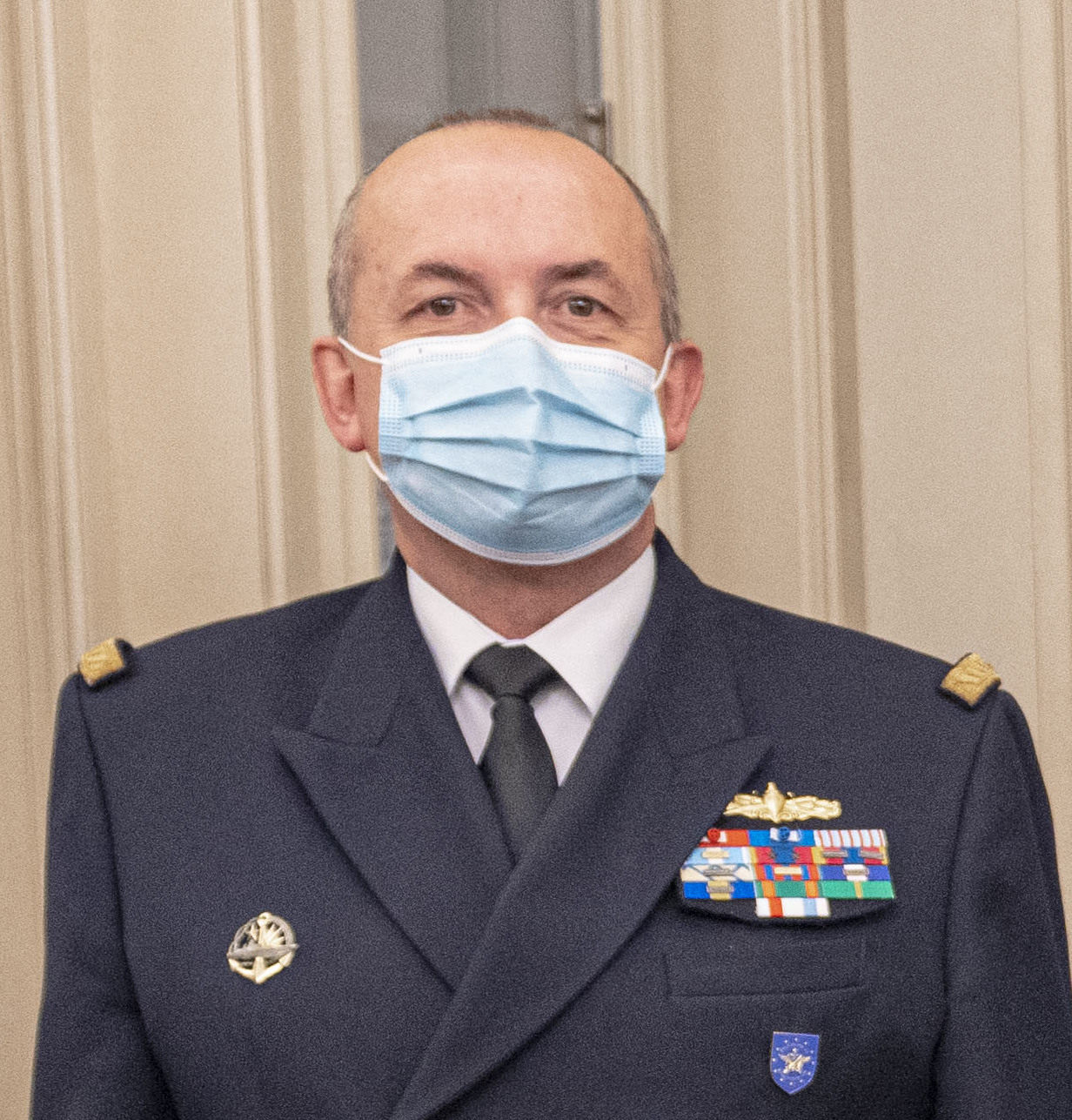
- Bléjean in 2021

7th Director General of the European Union Military Staff
- elected 22 May 2019
- In office 30 June 2020 – 28 June 2023
- Preceded by: General Esa Pulkkinen
- Succeeded by: Lt. General Michiel van der Laan

Personal details
- Born: 11 December 1963 (age 62) Toulon, France

Military service
- Allegiance: France
- Branch/service: French Navy
- Years of service: 1984–present
- Rank: vice admiral
- Unit: EU; NATO; French Armed Forces
- Commands: EU Military Staff; EU Naval Force; Deputy Chief of Staff Joint Operations NATO; Combined Task Force 150; Allied Maritime Commands; FS frigate Vendémiare; Georges Leygues destroyer; EUMAM Ukraine

Hervé Bléjean (born 11 December 1963) is a military officer of the French Navy who served as the Director-General of the European Union Military Staff since 30 June 2020 to 28 June 2023. He previously served as the Deputy Commander of NATO Maritime Command.

Hervé Bléjean, a vice admiral of the French Armed Forces and the first naval officer to take up this position in the European Union, was born on 11 December 1963 in Toulon. He enrolled in the French Naval Academy in 1984. He was assigned to the escort ship Victor Schoelcher, before becoming the executive officer of Thetis ship including participation in Operation Prométhée of the Iraq-Iran War in 1988, and of the Charles De Gaulle aircraft carrier. He attended a one-year course in CIS and went on to serve in the USS Nicholson as assistant operations officer of the French exchange for two years before moving to command the Leopard training ship and that of Navigation Training Flotilla in 1993. He also commanded the Georges Leygues ASW destroyer as an operation officer. He was later moved to the Chief of Naval Staff office as his Aide-de-Camp. He was also later in charge of the French Force d’Action Navale in 1998 as sea rider under the training department.

He continued with his military education in the Joint Service Defence College Paris in 2000 with a general staff course. He was posted to Ministry of Defence where he served as the director of human resources; he continued as executive assistant of the head of Human Resources Policy of the Navy HQ until 2005, also commanding the frigate FS Vendémiare in 2002 and spending six months in operation Enduring Freedom in the Gulf of Aden and Gulf of Oman. He was promoted to captain in 2005 followed by an appointment as the Head of the Naval Operations Department under the Joint Operations Centre HQ. He commanded the Jeannie d'arc helicopter carrier in 2007.

He went on to complete a military Advanced Studies in the National Defence Institute before he rose to be the Deputy Chief of the Military Office of the Prime Minister, where he was the auditor of the Military Centre for Higher Studies of 59th promotion in 2009, and that of the National Defence Institute for 62nd promotion which saw him in charge of State Responsibilities at Sea, and of nuclear deterrence. He was made Rear Admiral in 2013 and rose up to be the Deputy Commander of the French Maritime Force HQ in Toulon. He commanded Combined Task Force 150 and the Indian Ocean together with the European Union Naval Force in Atlanta until 2014. He was later in charge of International Relations and Partnerships in 2014 under the Naval Staff.

== Commands ==
Bléjean served as the Commander of European Union Naval Force Atlanta through which he was involved in the Gulf of Aden in the Coast of Somalia tackling maritime piracy. He became the first deputy Commander of European Union Naval Force Mediterranean Operation Sophia in 2015-16. He served as the Foreign Affairs Coordinator of the French Navy, Paris after handing over the office.

Bléjean has been a member of NATO since 2016. He served as a Deputy Chief of Staff Operation of the Joint Force HQ Naples, before he rose to be the deputy Commander Allied Maritime Command Northwood. He conducted operations in Kosovo and that of NATO HQ, Sarajevo partnering with EU Operations in Althea. He was also in charge of Maritime Component South, Trident Juncture in 2018.

Bléjean was promoted to Deputy Commander of NATO Maritime Command in December 2019. In 2019, he was appointed to the office of the Director-General of the European Union Military Staff. Concurrently, in October 2022, he was assigned to lead the European Union Military Assistance Mission Ukraine (EUMAM Ukraine), aimed at providing military training to the Ukrainian soldiers in response to the 2022 Russian invasion of Ukraine.

== Decorations ==
- Officer of the Légion d'honneur
- Officer of the National Order of Merit

Military offices
Preceded by General Esa Pulkkinen	Director-General of the European Union Military Staff; 2020-present	Incumbent
