= Wolfgang Wosolsobe =

Austrian army officer (1955–2018)

Wolfgang Wosolsobe (1955–2018) was an Austrian army officer.

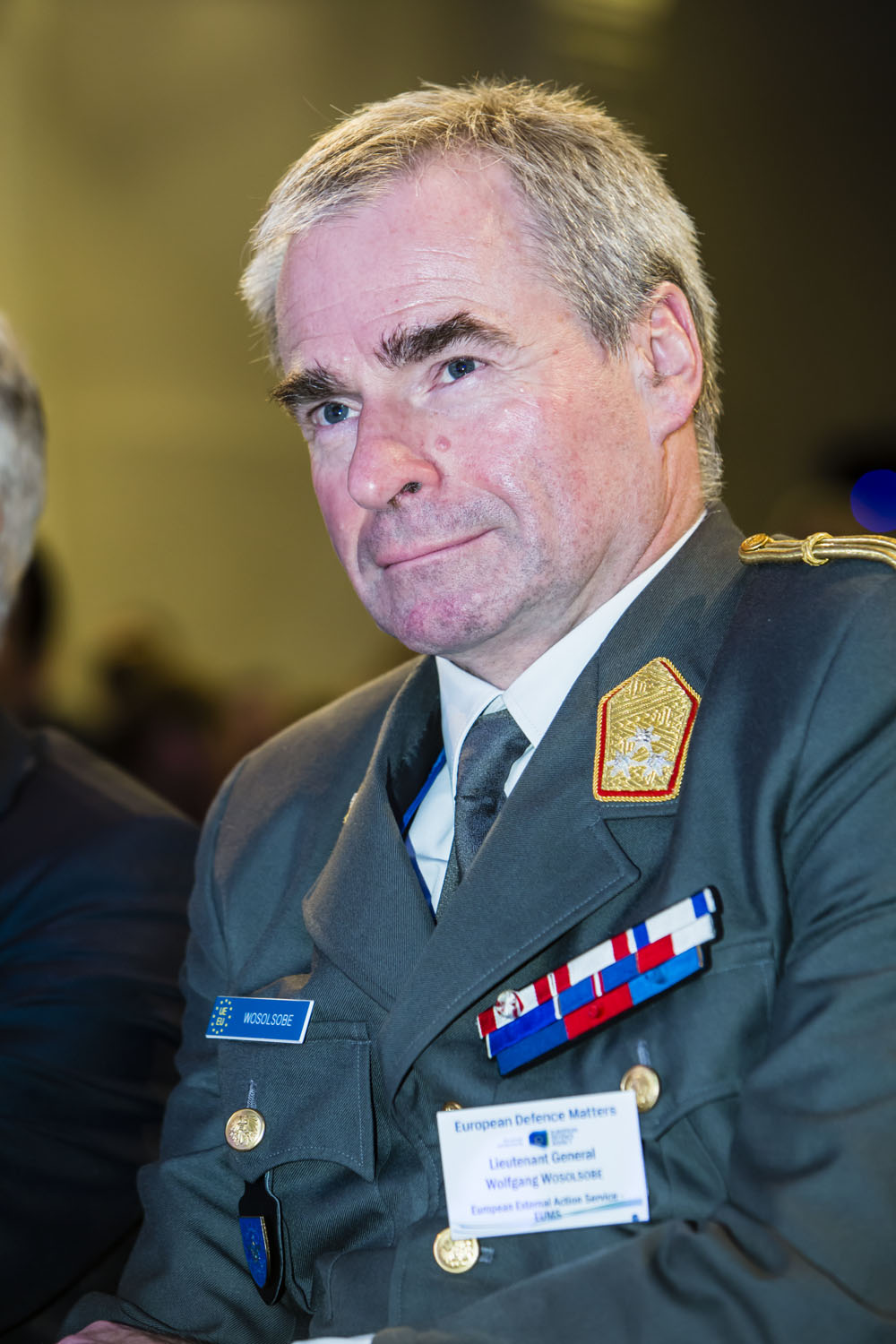
Wolfgang Wosolsobe at the 2014 EDA European Defence Matters conference

He led the Austrian military delegation to Brussels, between 2007 and 2012. He was appointed to a three-year term as Director-General of the Military Staff of the European Union, starting in 2013.

== See also ==
- European External Action Service

Military offices
Preceded by Lt Gen Ton van Osch	Director General of the European Union Military Staff; 2013–2016	Succeeded by Lt Gen Esa Pulkkinen
