= War Studies Academy =

War Studies University
- Akademia Sztuki Wojennej
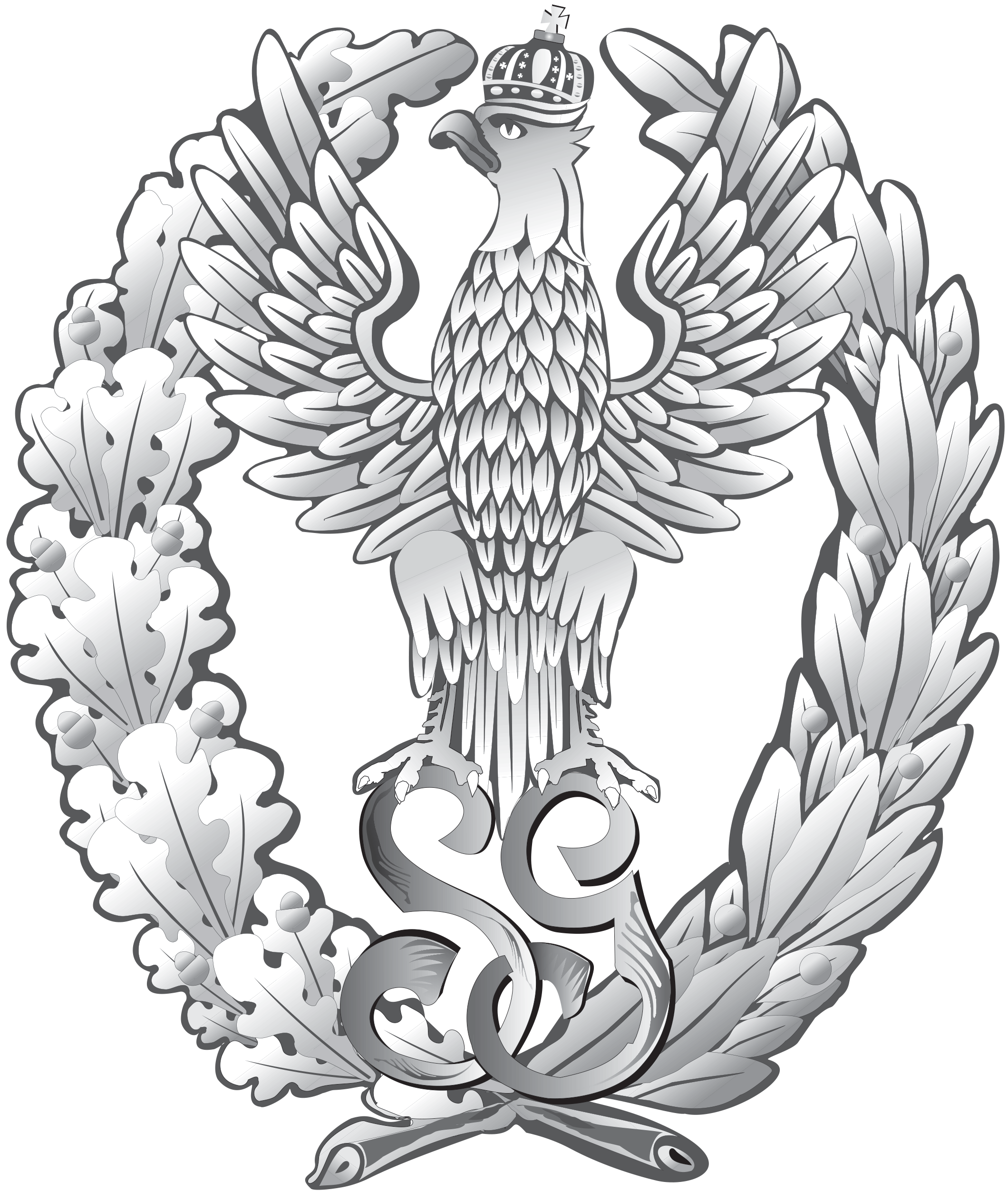
- Type: Military university
- Established: 15 March 1765 by Stanisław August Poniatowski
- Commandant: Ryszard Parafianowicz
- Academic staff: 600
- Students: 2,379 (12.2023)
- Location: Rembertów, Warsaw, Poland
- Affiliations: ISMS
- Website: www.akademia.mil.pl

The War Studies University (Polish: Akademia Sztuki Wojennej; ASzWoj) is the highest military academic institution in Poland. It was formed by Ministry of National Defence in 2016 in place of the former National Defence University Academy (Akademia Obrony Narodowej, AON) established in 1990. Minister of National Defence Wojciech Fałkowski explained that the reorganization of the academy was inspired by the need to improve the proportion of military students in the university's overall profile.

ASzWoj and its forerunners including Wyższa Szkoła Wojenna Academy of 1919, have influenced other institutions through its age and distinctive mission. ASzWoj traces its roots to 1765 when King Stanisław August Poniatowski established the Corps of Cadets, the first state school in the Polish–Lithuanian Commonwealth. The Corps of Cadets was succeeded by the Higher War School (1919–1946), then by the Świerczewski General Staff Academy (1947-1990) and then by the National Defence University (1990–2016).

ASzWoj grants bachelor's degrees, master's degrees, and doctoral degrees. It also offers a comprehensive higher doctorate (habilitation) program. ASzWoj is funded by the Ministry of National Defence, and cooperates with the North Atlantic Treaty Organization.

== See also ==
- Certified officer
