= Baltic Defence College =

Multinational defense college

- (Estonia) Balti Kaitsekolledž (Latvia) Baltijas Aizsardzības koledža (Lithuania) Baltijos gynybos koledžas
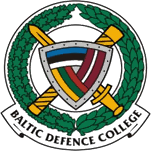
- Emblem
- Motto: Ad securitatem patriarum (Latin: For the fatherlands’ security)
- Type: Military college
- Established: 25 February 1999; 27 years ago
- Affiliations: ISMS; IAMP
- Academic staff: Approx. 50
- Students: Approx. 80
- Location: Tartu, Estonia; 58°22′24″N 26°43′21″E
- Website: www.baltdefcol.org

The Baltic Defence College (BALTDEFCOL) is a multinational military college that was established by the three Baltic states (Estonia, Latvia and Lithuania) in 1999. It serves as a centre of strategic and operational research and provides professional military education to intermediate- and senior-level officers and government officials from the founding states, other member states of the European Union (EU) and the North Atlantic Treaty Organization (NATO) countries, as well as other European countries including Armenia, Azerbaijan, Bosnia and Herzegovina, Georgia, Moldova, Montenegro, Serbia and Ukraine.

== Research ==
The Baltic Defence College hosts roundtable seminars and major conferences annually, including a Cyber Conference and a Conference on Russian Power Projection. The college's academic faculty also engage in personal research, generating a range of different articles, books and commentaries each year.

== Commandants ==
Nationality	Rank	Name	Term
Denmark	Brigadier general	Michael H. Clemmesen	1999–2004
Lithuania	Brigadier general	Algis Vaičeliūnas	2004–2007
Latvia	Brigadier general	Gundars Ābols	2007–2010
Estonia	Brigadier general	Meelis Kiili	2010–2012
Lithuania	Major general	Vitalijus Vaikšnoras	2012–2016
Latvia	Major general	Andis Dilāns	2016–2020
Estonia	Brigadier general	Ilmar Tamm	2020–2023
Lithuania	Brigadier general	Alvydas Šiuparis	2023-present

== Deans ==
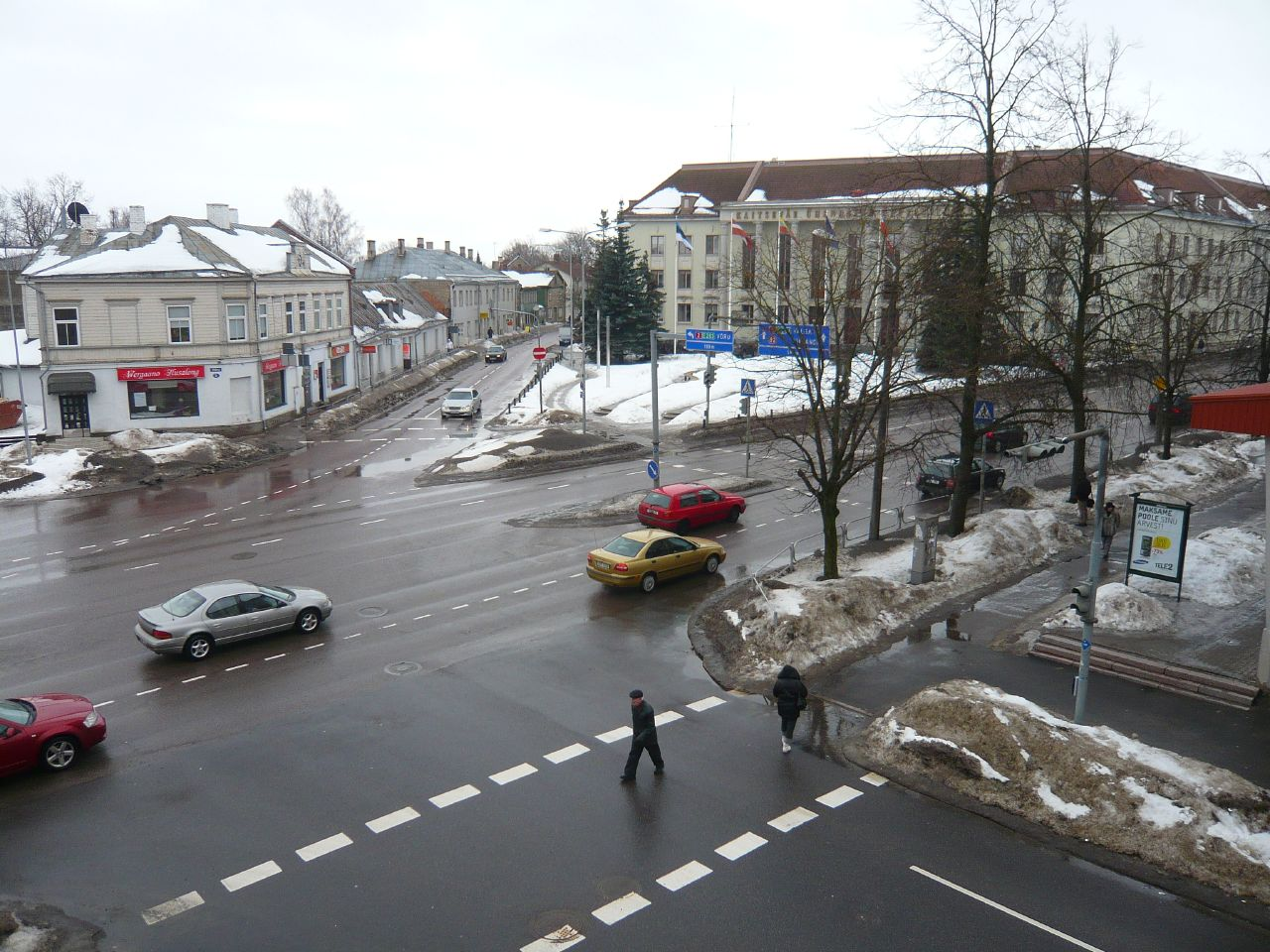
A distant view on the Baltic Defence College building (upper right corner).

The dean between 2004 and 2008 was Tomas Jermalavicius – a Lithuanian researcher of strategic resiliency.

== See also ==
- Estonian National Defence College
- List of universities in Estonia
- NATO Defense College
- European Security and Defence College
- NATO School
