= National Defence University (Finland) =

Military academy in Helsinki

- Maanpuolustuskorkeakoulu (Finnish); Försvarshögskolan (Swedish)
- Former name: National Defence College (before 2007)
- Type: Public
- Established: 1993; 33 years ago
- Affiliations: ISMS; IAMP
- Rector: Major General Mika Kalliomaa
- Students: 850 (academic degree); 1,000–1,300 (courses)
- Location: Helsinki, Finland; 60°9′13″N 25°3′17″E
- Campus: Santahamina
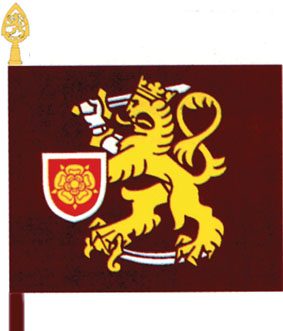
- Flag
- Website: http://www.mpkk.fi/

The Finnish National Defence University (Finnish: Maanpuolustuskorkeakoulu, MPKK, Swedish: Försvarshögskolan) is a military university located in Helsinki. The university trains officers for the Finnish Defence Forces and the Finnish Border Guard. The main campus is located in Santahamina, Helsinki.

Prior to 2007, the school referred to itself, in English, as the National Defence College.

== History ==
The first army officer school in Finland, then part of Sweden, was Haapaniemen sotakoulu, which was founded by Georg Magnus Sprengtporten in 1780 in Kuopio and relocated to Rantasalmi in 1781. Initially, it was established to train officers for the Savo Brigade of the Swedish Army, but soon it began to recruit cadets from all of Finland. The school continued operation even after the Finnish War in 1809, where Finland was ceded to the Russian Empire. However, in 1818, a fire broke out in the building, and the school was moved to Hamina to become the Hamina Cadet School.

The Hamina Cadet School was trained officers for the Russian Empire. It was abolished on July 24, 1903 under the influence of various orders given during the first period of repression of Finland by the Russian Empire.

After independence, the Finnish officer training was always divided among three schools until 1992: initial education at the Kadettikoulu ("Cadet School", abbreviated KADK, founded in 1919), General Staff Officer Training at the Sotakorkeakoulu ("War College", founded in 1924), as well as continuous training at the Taistelukoulu ("Battle School", founded in 1927). From the beginning of 1993, all of these schools were merged into the National Defence University, one of the largest colleges of higher education for officer education.

In 2001, the Maanpuolustusopisto ((a military junior college), known as NDI, national defence institute)) in Lappeenranta was decommissioned, but the school was immediately repurposed to provide freshman and army training for the National Defence University, as the Army Academy (Finnish: Maasotakoulu, "Land Warfare School").

== Rectors of the National Defense University ==
Rank	Name	Term
Kenraalimajuri / Major General	Antero Karvinen (born 1934)	1993-1994
Kontra-amiraali	Esko Illi (born 1945)	1994-1996
Kenraalimajuri	Seppo Tanskanen (born 1941)	1997-2001
Kenraalimajuri	Aarno Vehviläinen (born 1944)	2001-2004
Kenraalimajuri	Pertti Salminen (born 1954)	2004-2009
Kenraalimajuri	Vesa Tynkkynen (born 1954)	2009-2013
Kontra-amiraali	Veijo Taipalus (born 1958)	2013-2015
Kenraalimajuri	Ilkka Korkiamäki (born 1960)	2016-2018
Kenraalimajuri	Jari Kallio (born 1961)	2018-2021
Kenraalimajuri	Mika Kalliomaa (born 1966)	2021-

== Academics ==
National Defence University awards the degrees of Bachelor's, Master and Doctor in military science. The defining feature of the University is the fact that it is the only institution the degrees of which qualify for a permanent appointment as a non-staff corps officer of the Finnish Defence Forces or the Finnish Border Guard. This close relation with the Finnish military shapes and informs all academic life of the University.

=== Undergraduate studies ===
Applicants to the bachelor's program need to be Finnish citizens under 26 years of age with a completed secondary education and a conscript service. They need to have at least a reserve NCO's training and a complete secondary education. Those who are not reserve officers are selected with the conditions that they pass reserve officer training prior to the start of their studies.

Bachelor of military science is awarded to students after three years of full-time studies in a residential program. The studies encompass 180 ECTS worth of academic and 30 ECTS of military-professional subjects. During their studies, the students receive accommodation, uniform, health care and nutrition free of charge, and are paid a per diem of 48 euros for miscellaneous expenses.

The curriculum of the bachelor's degree is based on the understanding of the military sciences as consisting of five basic subjects: leadership, military pedagogy, military technology and art of war, the last of which is divided to strategy, military history and operational art and tactics. The degree does not feature a major subject but has program and branch specific studies. There are four bachelor's programs (army, navy, air force ground services and pilot officer) with a total of 19 branches that mostly correspond to the branches of each service. Students destined as Border Guard officers study in the Border Guard branch of the program of their operational environment. The students are servicemen under military discipline in the rank of cadet. As officer training is a prerequisite for attending the bachelor's degree program, cadets are considered equivalent to second lieutenants in the military rank system and chain of command.

All graduates of the bachelor's program are promoted to lieutenant and appointed as professional officers in the Finnish Defence Forces or in the Finnish Border Guard.

=== Post-graduate studies ===
Typically, after five years' service, the junior officers return to National Defence University for their Master of military science degree. This program takes two years of full-time studies, 120 ECTS. The military students are officers and enjoy full pay and benefits during their studies. However, the officers who are aircraft pilots take their master's degree immediately after the bachelor's, but as they study part-time in conjunction with their flying service, their studies take seven years to complete. The studies have a service- and branch-specific part. There is, however, also a civilian master's program in interagency cooperation, mainly targeted to current or prospective civil servants, and aiming to produce security experts for civilian authorities. The students in the civilian program pay no tuition, and receive no qualifications for the military officer's profession.

The doctoral program is meant for officers who have passed the general staff officer course and it aims to produce persons with research skills. Civilians with Master of military science, or in exceptionally cases, some other relevant master's degree, may also be considered. In addition to post-graduate courses, the degree includes a dissertation that shall include new scientific or scholarly knowledge. The disciplines where the doctoral degree is possible are leadership, operations and tactics, strategy, military history, military pedagogy, military sociology, military technology and war economy.

=== Continuous education ===
In addition to the academic degrees, the National Defence University offers the Field Officer and General Staff Officer courses. These courses are conducted in the War College.

The Field Officer course is a six-month course to which officers of the Finnish Defence Forces are usually commanded after 14–16 of service after the Bachelor's degree. The course is designed to prepare its students for work in staff positions at all national command levels and as chief of sector or office on brigade or service headquarters.

A number of students are selected to continue to the general staff officer course. This course lasts for a year and prepares its graduates for the most demanding officer duties on the joint level and for command duties from peace-time battalion command (or equivalent) upwards. The graduation of the general staff officer course is a requirement for promotion to the rank of colonel or naval captain.

The highest personnel of the Finnish Defence Forces are given continuous training in the Course for Senior Personnel (Ylemmän päällystön kurssi) that is taken about seven years after the general staff officer course and in the Course for Senior Command (Ylemmän johdon kurssi). Unlike the field officer course and general staff officer course, these courses accept also staff corps officers who have a civilian academic degree but are destined for very senior positions in their corps.

=== National Defence Courses ===
The National Defence Courses (maanpuolustuskurssit) are a Finnish institution that is continuous training for the persons in senior middle management of all sectors of the society. The consulting board for national defence education (Maanpuolustusopetuksen neuvottelukunta), a non-partisan body consisting of representatives of various organisations selects the participants from the persons who work in duties that are significant for the total security of the country on national level. Each course has about 50 participants who range from field officers and senior civil servants to corporate executives and from politicians to novelists.

The courses take place four times a year, and last for three and half weeks, with 15 contact teaching days. The course includes lectures and exercises on national security, foreign amd defence policy, economy, national leadership and command arrangements, infrastructure, societal resilience and security of supply. The theoretical education is supplemented with site visits to various organisations significant to total security and resilience. The aim of the course is to allow senior persons from different walks of life to share a common understanding of the measures taken to prepare Finland for various crises, allowing them to act more efficiently in their own duties to prepare for and to work during a crisis.

== Departments ==
The University is divided into colleges, three academic departments and other units. While the departments are responsible for the instruction and research, the other units have national-level special duties.

- War College (Sotakorkeakoulu), responsible for Senior Command Course, the Senior Staff Officer Course and the Chief of branch course
- Tactical Command and Staff College (Taistelukoulu), responsible for Master's degree program
- Military Academy (Kadettikoulu), responsible for Bachelor's degree program
- Department of Leadership and Military Pedagogy
- Department of Warfare
- Department of Military Technology
- Department of Academic Affairs
- Defence Language Center
- National Defence Courses
- Finnish Defence Forces International Center
- Military Museum

== Locations ==
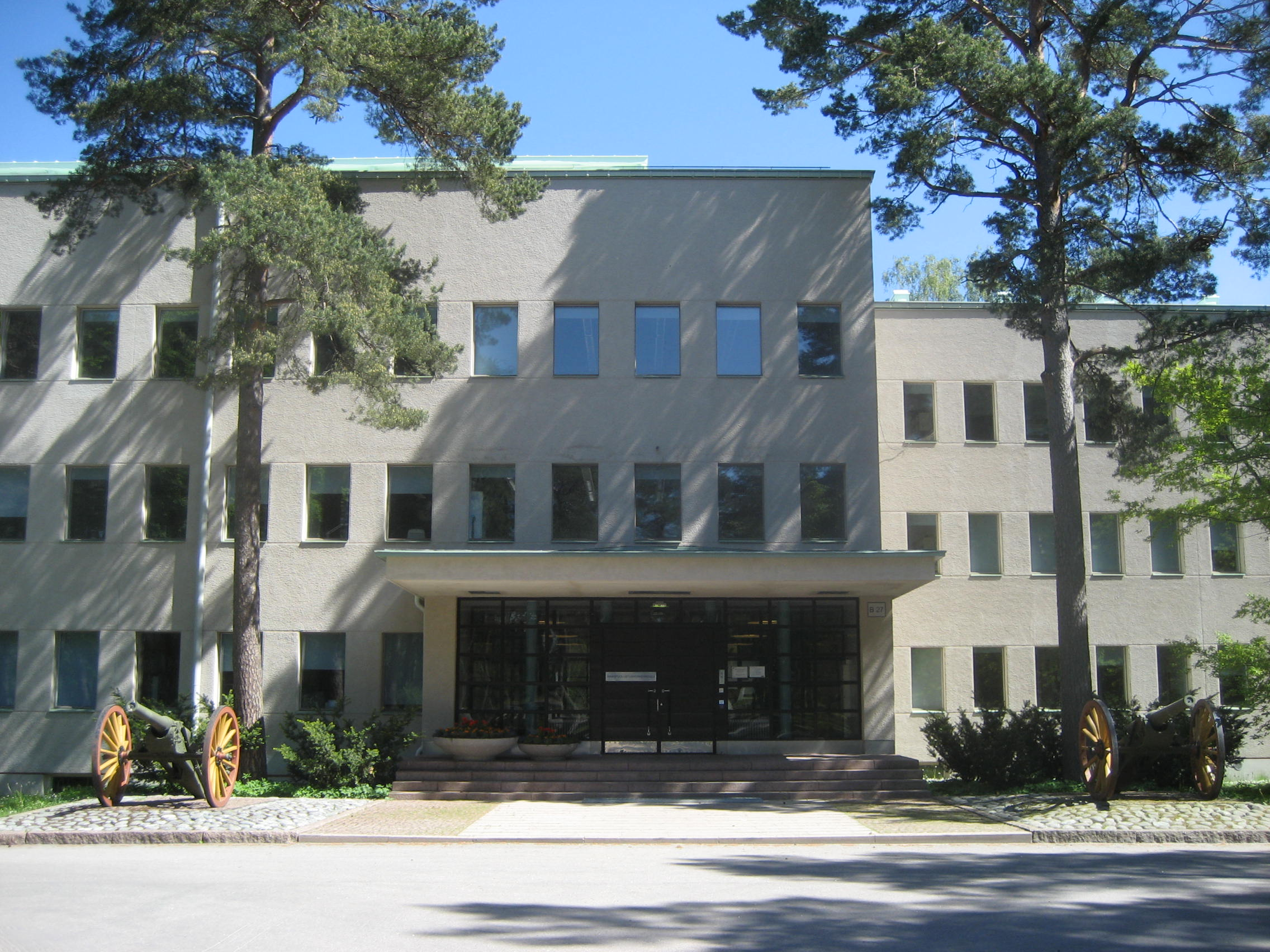
The main campus in Santahamina

=== Service branch schools ===
The following establishments are responsible for the branch- or service-specific education of the students:

- Air Force Academy, Tikkakoski
- Army Academy, Lappeenranta
  - Armour School, Hämeenlinna
  - Artillery School, Niinisalo
  - Engineer School, Lappeenranta
  - Infantry School, Lappeenranta
  - Signals School, Riihimäki
- Naval Academy, Helsinki
- Border and Coast Guard Academy, Espoo & Imatra (part of Finnish Border Guard)
- Logistics School, Riihimäki (part of Defence Forces Logistics Command)

Besides these, Military Museum of Finland, National Defence Courses departments and the National Defence University Library operate under National Defence University.
