= Koninklijke Militaire Academie =

Military academy in the Netherlands

Koninklijke Militaire Academie Royal Military Academy
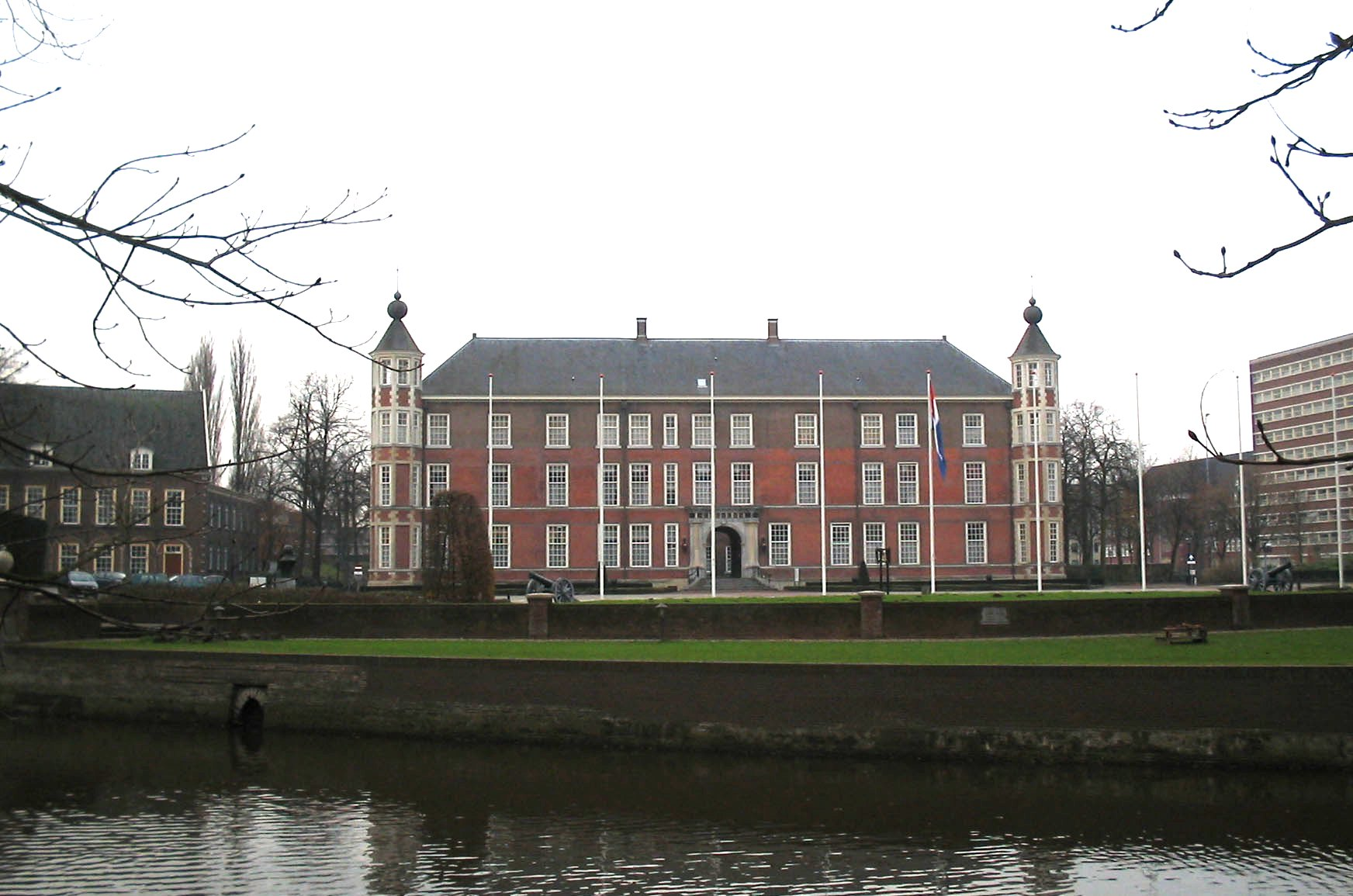
- Type: National military academy
- Established: 1828; 198 years ago
- Affiliations: ISMS
- Students: Future officers in the Royal Netherlands Army, the Royal Netherlands Air and Space Force or the Royal Netherlands Marechaussee
- Undergraduates: Bachelor's degree
- Location: (Netherlands) Breda, Netherlands; 51.5915°N 4.7753°E
- Campus: Breda Castle on one square kilometre
- Website: Official website

The Royal Military Academy (Dutch: Koninklijke Militaire Academie or KMA) is the service academy for the Royal Netherlands Army, the Royal Netherlands Air and Space Force and the Royal Marechaussee. Located in Breda, North Brabant, the KMA has trained future officers since 1828.

== Description ==
The KMA offers a programme of study which lasts four or five years, depending on the academic major cadets choose. Academic programmes have changed significantly during its history. In today's programme cadets are awarded a bachelor's degree upon graduation and commissioned in the Royal Netherlands Army, the Royal Netherlands Air and Space Force or the Royal Marechaussee. The KMA also offers a shortened officers course of one and a half years. The training of the officers of the Royal Netherlands Navy and the Korps Mariniers is mainly done by the Royal Naval College in Den Helder. The campus is about one square kilometre.

== Ranks ==
NATO code	OF(D)	Student officer
NATO code	OF(D)	OR-5	OR-4	OR-3	OR-1
	5th year	4th year	3rd year	2nd year	1st year
Royal Netherlands Army
Royal Netherlands Army	Vaandrig/Kornet	Sergeant/ Wachtmeester	Korporaal der 1e klasse	Korporaal	Soldaat/ Huzaar/ Kanonnier der 3e klasse
Royal Netherlands Air and Space Force
Royal Netherlands Air and Space Force	Vaandrig	Sergeant	Korporaal der 1e klasse	Korporaal	Soldaat der 3de klasse
Royal Marechaussee
Royal Marechaussee	Kornet	Cadet Wachtmeester	Cadet Marechaussee der 1e klasse	Cadet Marechaussee der 2e klasse	Cadet Marechaussee der 4e klasse

== See also ==
- Koninklijke Militaire School
- Royal Naval College (Netherlands)
