= Armorial of Romania =

The Romanian government is the armiger in Romania. It exercises this right under the mandatory advice of the National Committee of Heraldry, Genealogy and Sigillography (Romanian: Comisia Națională de Heraldică, Genealogie și Sigilografie). The committee is subordinate to the Romanian Academy. All the coats of arms of Romanian institutions must be approved by this committee with two exceptions. The Romanian military is subject to the Ministry of National Defense Heraldric Committee, and Romanian law enforcement institutions are subject to the Ministry of Administration and Interior Heraldric Committee. Both of these committees may share members with the National Committee of Heraldry, Genealogy and Sigillography.

== Romanian coats of arms ==
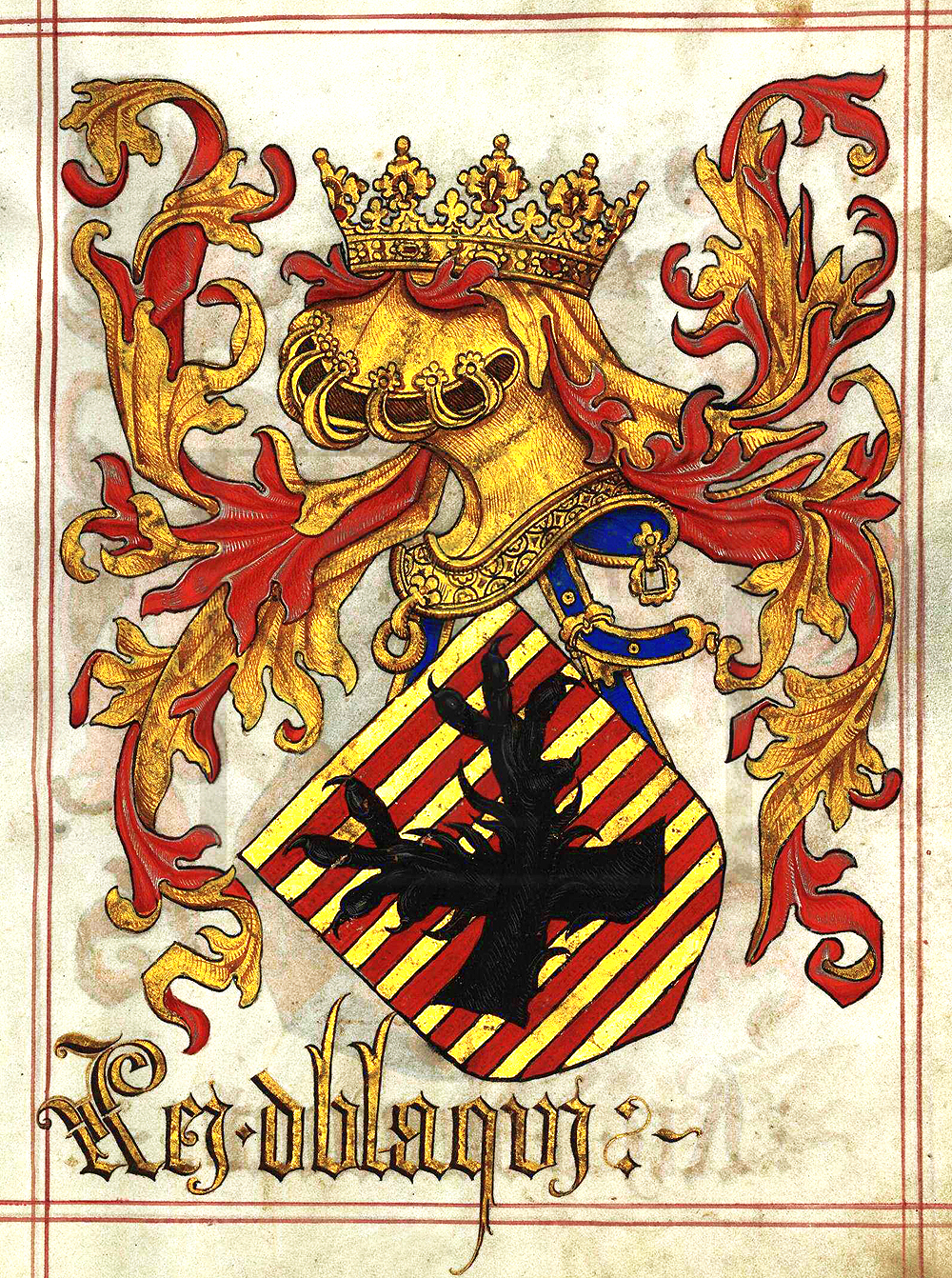
Arms of the King of Vlachs from the Portuguese Livro do Armeiro-Mor. (Perhaps from the Second Bulgarian Empire).

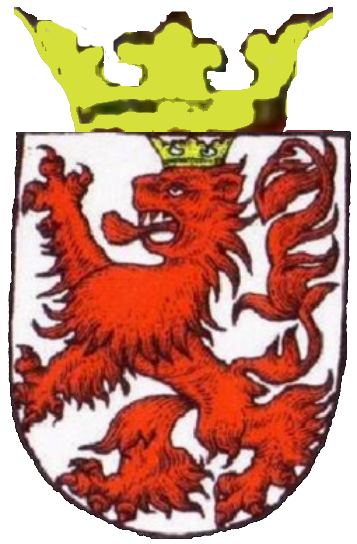
Arms of Mircea I of Wallachia (from a personal seal.) (The lion was used by many rulers of the House of Basarab)

=== Medieval States ===
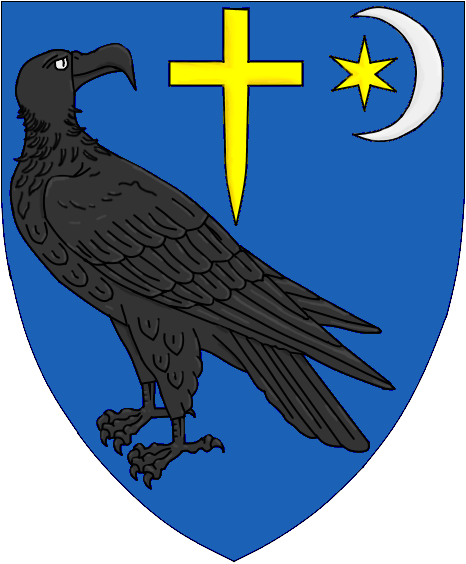
Reproduction of Wallachia coat of arms in Middle Ages

Reproduction of Moldavia coat of arms in Middle Ages

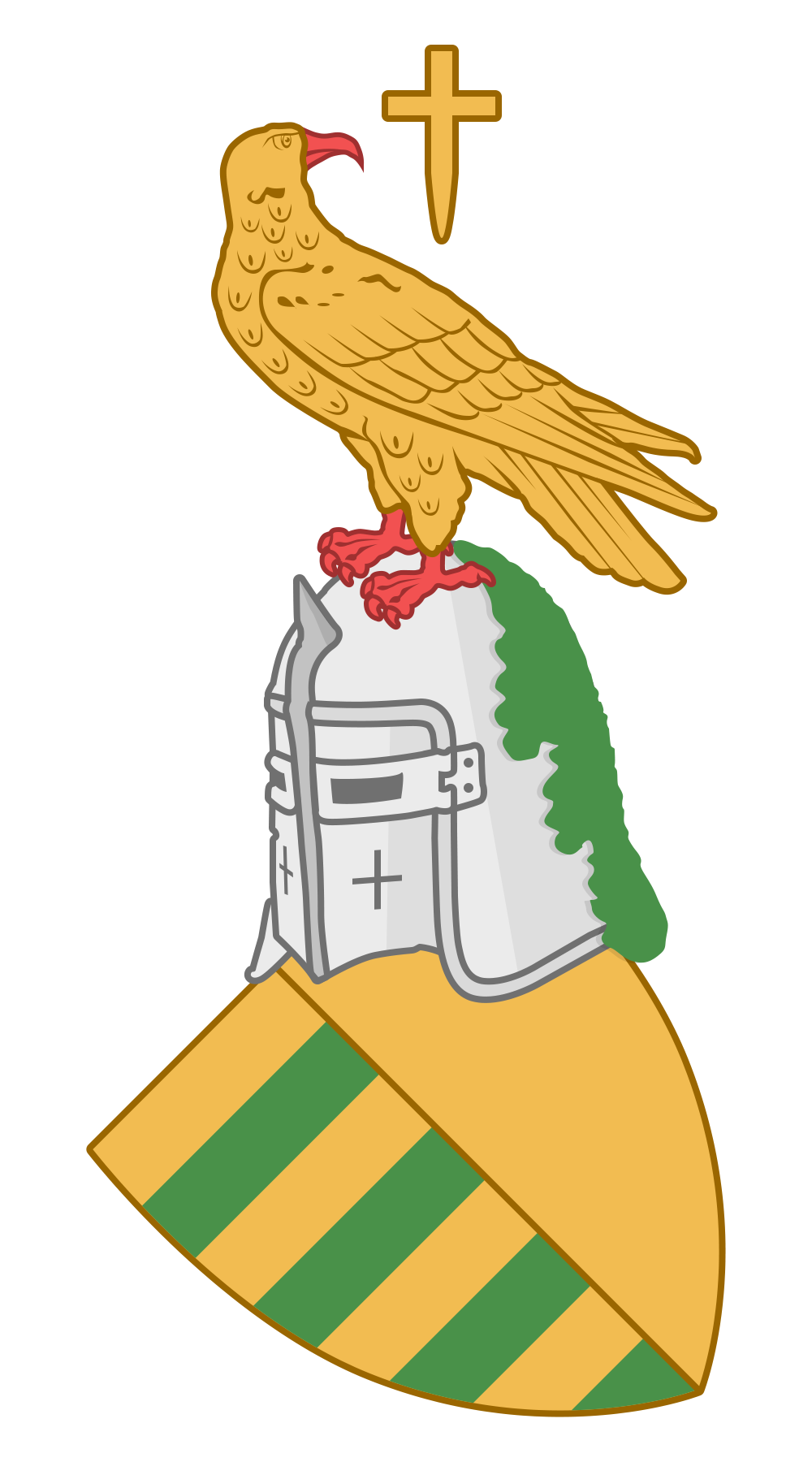
Coat of Arms of the House of Basarab, founding dynasty of Wallachia

=== Coat of Arms during the Early Modern Period ===
The coats of arms of the early modern period represent the states of Romania from about the 16th century to about the 19th century.

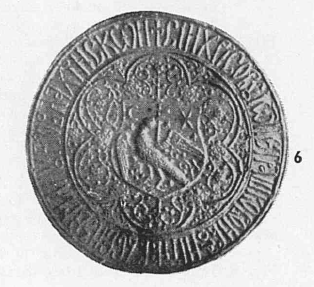
Coat of arms of Wallachia, 1557 from the seal of Pătrașcu cel Bun.

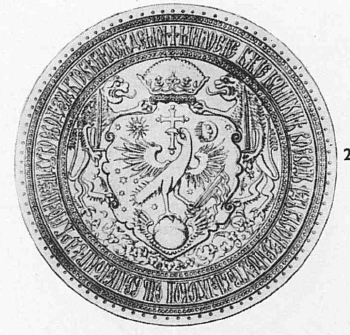
Coat of arms of Wallachia 1587, from the seal of Mihnea Vodă Turcitul.

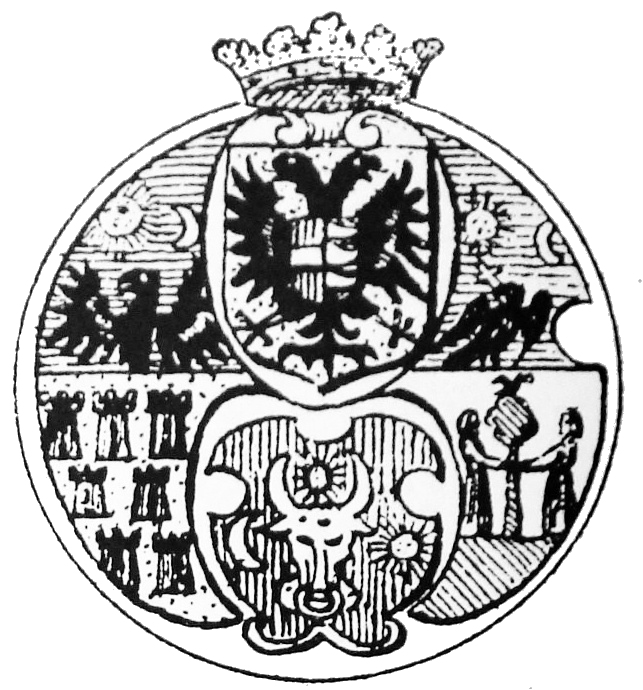
Coat of arms of Sigismund Bathory, suzerain of Transylvania at the time.

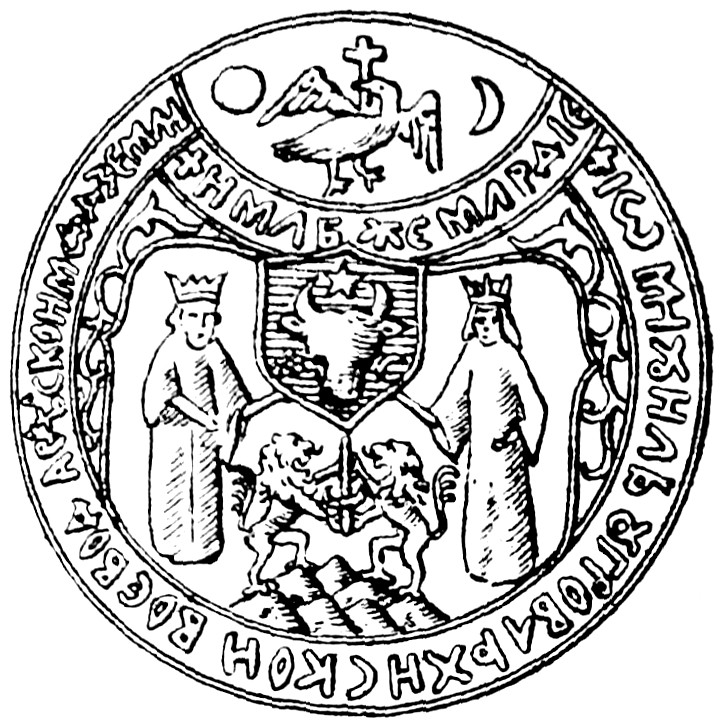
Coat of arms of prince Mihai Patraşcu (Michael the Brave), as lord of the first Romanian union between Moldova, Transylvania, and Wallachia, called the Dacian Principalities

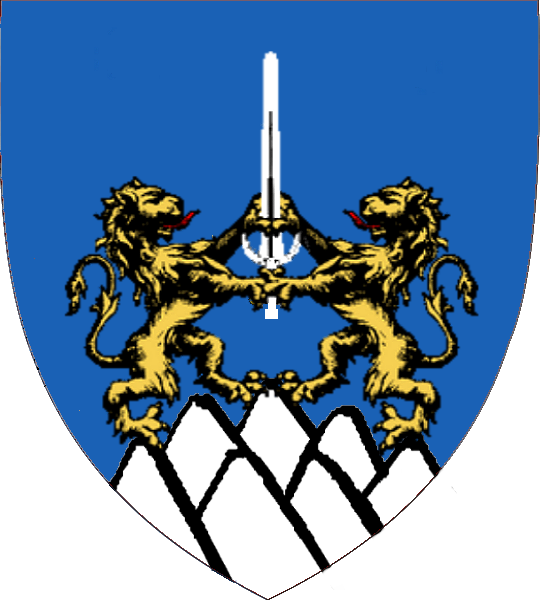
Coat of arms of Transylvania, under Michael the Brave. The coat of arms of Transylvania depicts two rampant lions, together holding a sword, representing the Kingdom of Dacia, (or the dynasty of Wallachia), and the seven hills representing the seven cities of the Transylvanian Saxons.

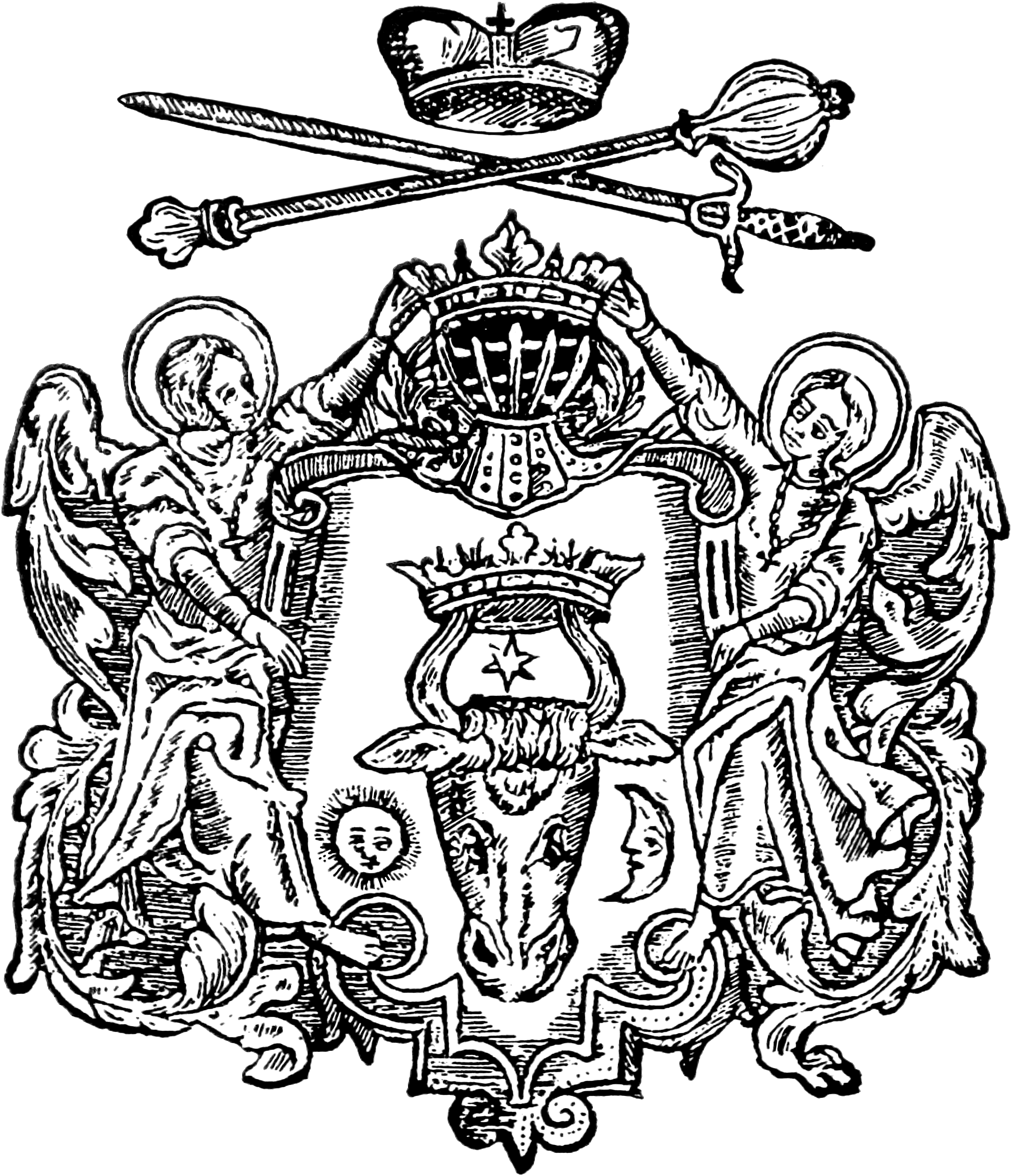
Coat of arms of Moldova, 1646

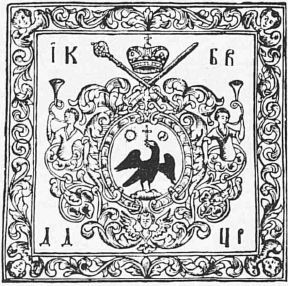
Coat of arms of Wallachia, 1691

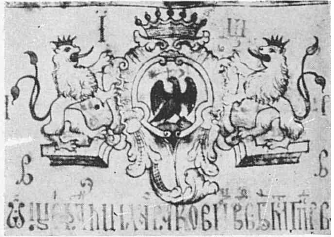
Coat of arms of Wallachia, 1765

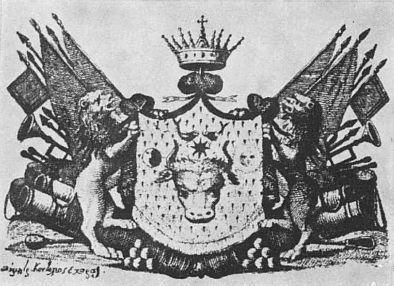
Coat of arms of Moldova, 1816

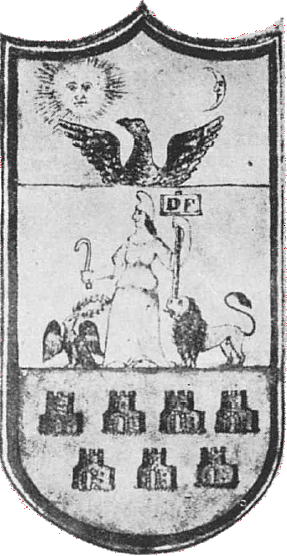
Coat of arms of Ardeal (Transylvania), proposed in 1848 by Romanian revolutionaries.

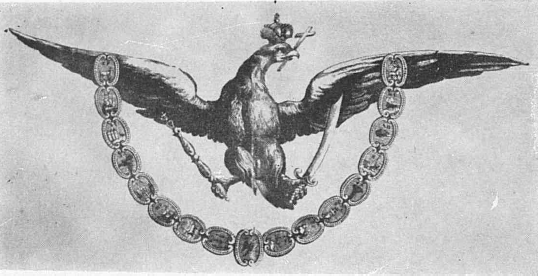
Coat of arms of Wallachia, 1851

=== States of the modern period ===
==== The United Principalities of Moldavia and Wallachia 1859–1866 ====
After the election of Alexandru Ioan Cuza as Domnitor of Wallachia and Moldavia, the heraldic symbols of the two countries were united to form the coat of arms of the new state. In 1862, this new state was named Romania. However, the idea was not new. Most of the Phanariotes used united symbols in their personal coat of arms to show that they held power in both countries. Until 1866, there was no official design of the coat of arms of Romania, although the painter, Carol Popp de Szathmary, created some draft designs.

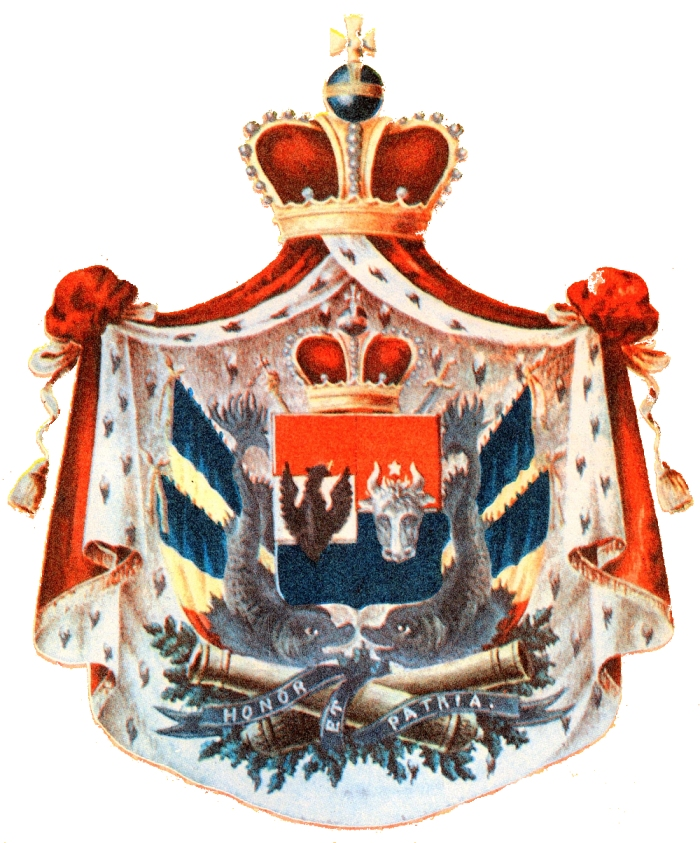

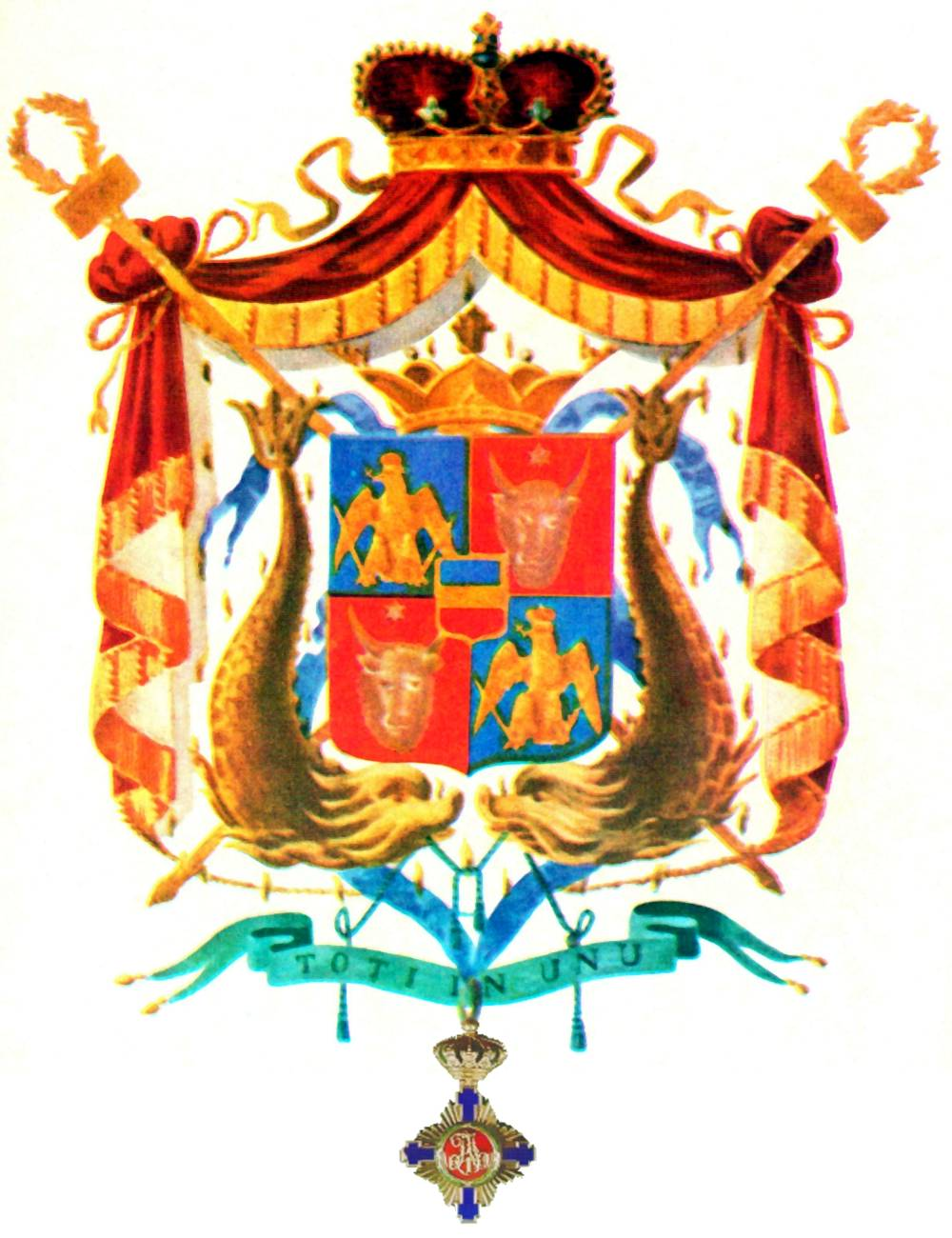

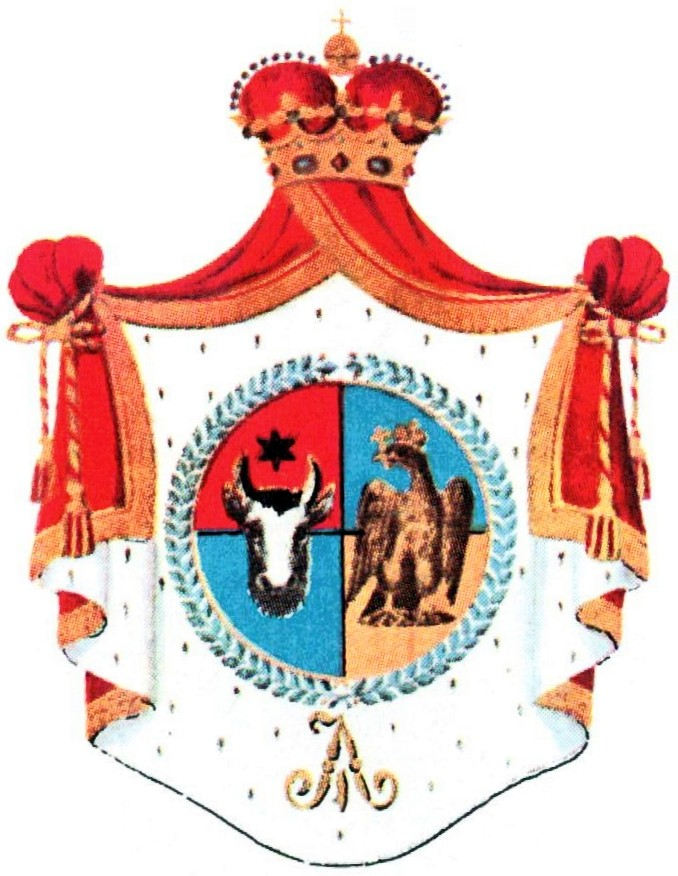

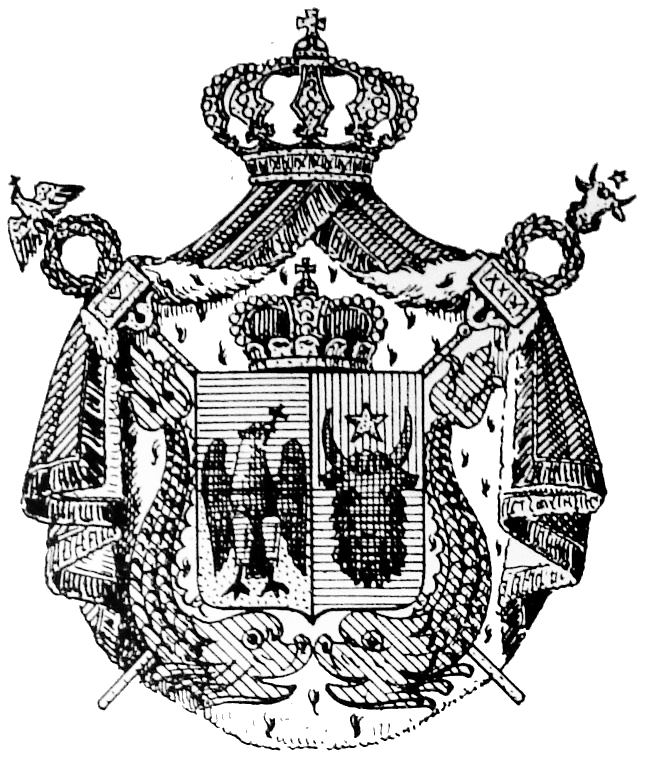

==== Romania 1866–1878 ====
After 10 May 1866, (when Carol I came to Romania), and the Constitution of 1 June 1866 was founded, the coat of arms of Romania was established. It used concepts found in previous coats of arms. From 1872, the coat of arms represented the Kingdom of Romania. In 1878, when Romania gained independence, the coat of arms was changed again.

=== Kingdom of Romania ===
==== 1872–1921 ====
In 1872, the heraldic symbols of Oltenia and the Black Sea coast were added to the Romanian coat of arms. In 1881, the symbol of Dobrudja was added and its aspect was slightly changed.

1872-1881

1881-1921

==== 1921–1947 ====
After World War I, Transylvania, Bessarabia, Banat, and Bukovina united with the Kingdom of Romania. As a result, symbols representing the new territories were added to the coat of arms.

Royal House and Ministry of Foreign Affairs

Romanian Armed Forces (Ministry of War)

Romanian small coat of arms (for all other seals)

=== Communist Romania ===
==== People's Republic of Romania ====
After 1948, the Communist authorities changed both the flag and the coat of arms. The coat of arms became more emblematically faithful to Communist symbolism: a landscape (depicting a rising sun, a tractor and an oil drill) surrounded by stocks of wheat tied together with a cloth in the colors of the national flag. Between 1948 and 1966, there were three variants. The first came shortly after 1948 (the proclamation of the republic). The next was in 1952 when a red star was added.

January–March 1948

March 1948–1952

1952–1966

==== Socialist Republic of Romania ====
The final change to the communist emblem took place in 1966 when Romania ceased to be a People's Republic, and became a Socialist Republic. At this time, the wording changed from R. P. R. to Republica Socialista Romania.

=== Romania ===
==== 1989–1992 ====
Immediately after the fall of Nicolae Ceaușescu and the communist regime, the communist emblem was removed from all flags, and official seals. Some flags had a hole (a symbol of the revolution) and some changed to the later official blue-yellow-red format.

During this period, Romania had no de jure national emblem. 10-lei coins issued in this period bore a composition showing a wreath of olive overlaid on the Romanian Flag where the coat of arms would be located on later coins.

==== 1992–present ====
In 1992, the Parliament of Romania adopted a new coat of arms. Two models, both inspired by the coat of arms of the Kingdom of Romania, were merged to achieve the final result.

In April 2016, deputies of the Judiciary Committee endorsed a bill voted previously by the Senate that returns the crown on the head of the eagle and mandates the public authorities to replace the existing emblems and seals to those provided by law until 31 December 2018 (to mark the centenary of the Union of Transylvania with Romania on 1 December 1918). The bill was adopted by the Chamber of Deputies on 8 June 2016 and promulgated by President Klaus Iohannis on 11 July 2016.

The current coat of arms

The seal

Coat of arms of Romania (1992–2016)

=== Historic Romanian regions and provinces ===
==== Marmația ====
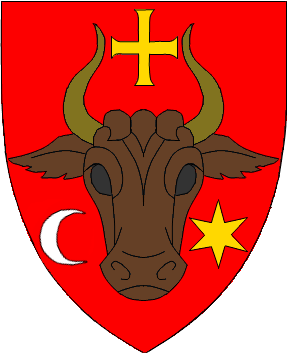
The coat of arms of Marmația

==== Crișana ====
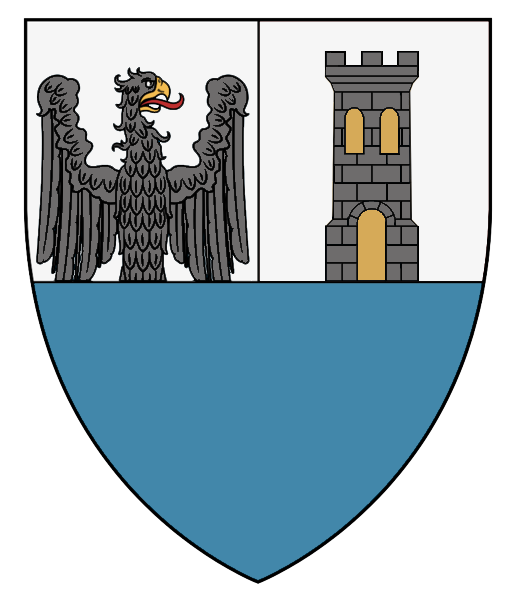
Unofficial Romanian arms of Crișana, 19th century

==== Banat Region ====
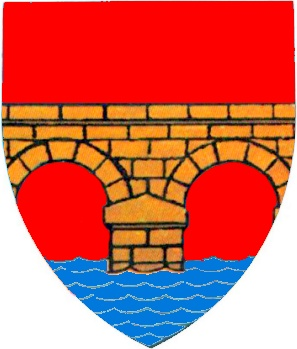
The bridge of Apollodorus of Damascus on the Danube, the coat of arms of Banat 1918–1947.

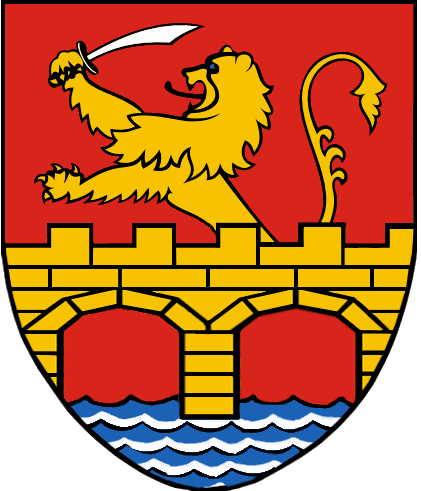
Coat of arms of Banat (the bridge) and Oltenia (the lion rampant) from 1992.

==== Transylvania ====
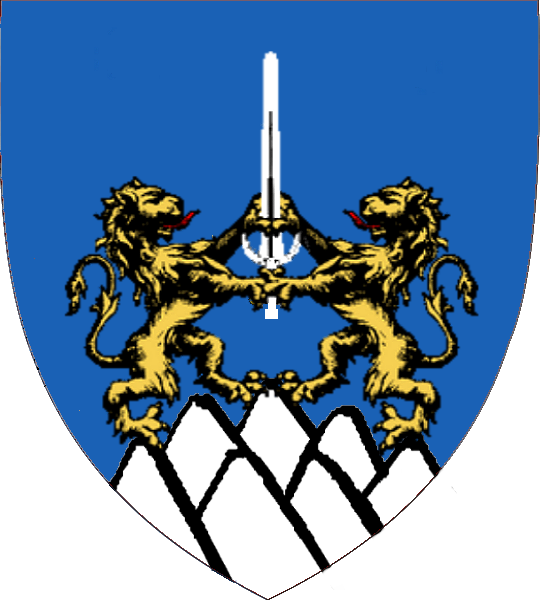
Coat of arms of Transylvania, under Michel the Brave

Cezar Bolliac redesign of the arms of Transylvania

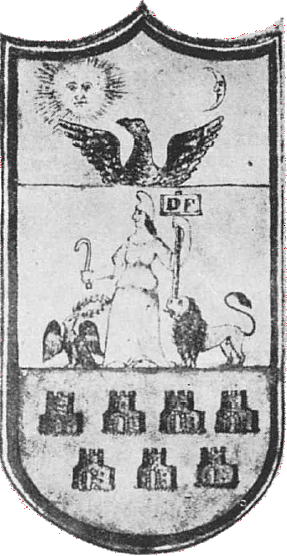
Arms endorsed by Romanian nationalists in 1840s

==== Wallachian Region ====
In the Middle Ages, Wallachia had two core provinces. One was Greater Wallachia (Muntenia) and the other was Lesser Walachia (Oltenia). There was also the disputed province of Dobruja. These provinces were mostly geographical, not administrative, but from the end of the 15th century, because the Banate of Severin was partitioned between Wallachia and the Kingdom of Hungary, Oltenia was ruled by a ban. Oltenia was known as the Banate of Craiova. It is unknown whether the Despotate of Dobruja originally had a coat of arms. Control of the region over time involved Romania, Bulgaria and the Ottoman Empire. The present coat of arms of Dobruja was created in 1872. Also in 1872, a new form of the Wallachia coat of arms was officiated to represent just Muntenia. In the Middle Ages, Muntenia had had a different heraldic symbol.

Coat of arms of Oltenia in the Middle Ages

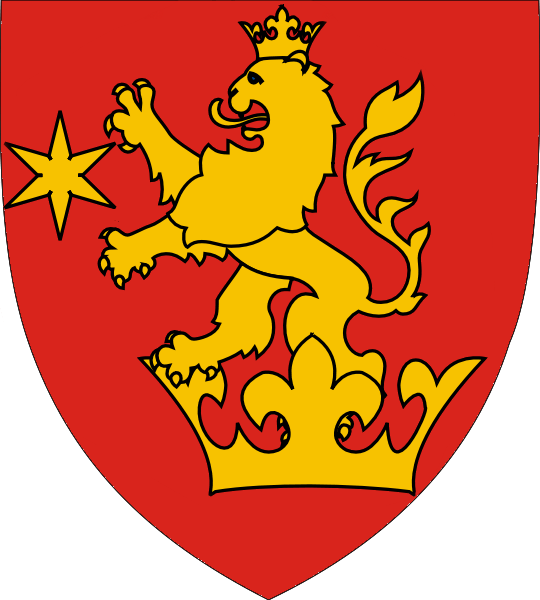
Coat of arms of Oltenia from 1872

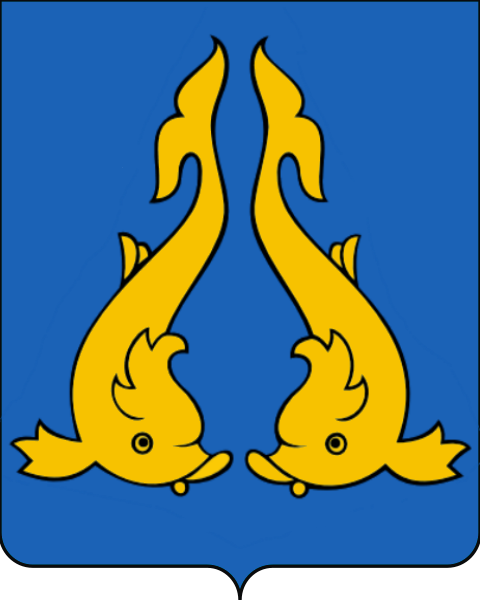
Coat of arms of Southern Bessarabia (1871–1878) and Dobruja (from 1878)

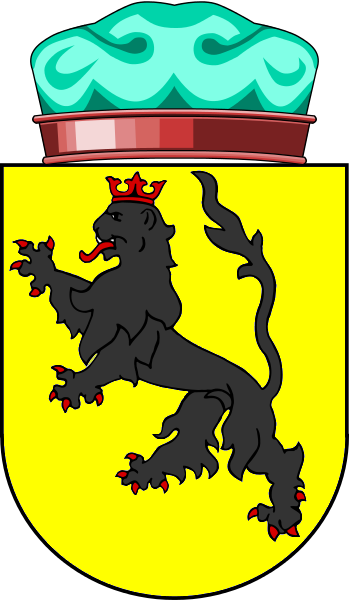
Coat of arms of Muntenia in the Middle Ages

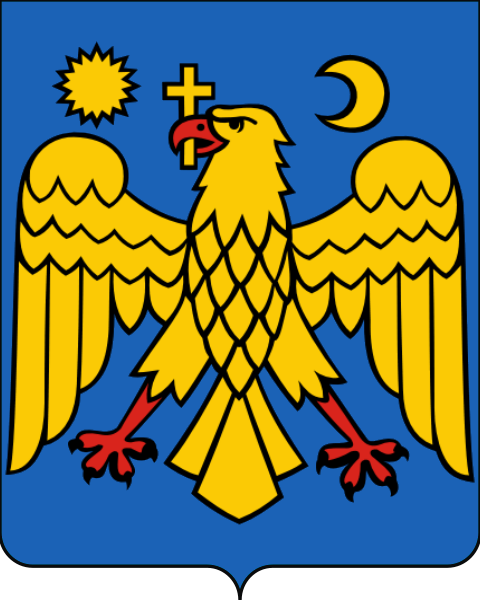
Coat of arms of Muntenia from 1872

==== Moldovan Region ====
In the Middle Ages, Moldova had four provinces: three permanent provinces, The Upper Country, The Lower Country and Basarabia, and a disputed province, Pokuttya. Moldova lay between the Ottoman Empire, the Austrian empire and the Russian Empire. The Upper Country (the northwestern part) was occupied by Austrians, who named the land Bucovina. The Lower Country (eastern part) was conquered by the Russian Empire. It was merged with Basarabia, forming the Guberniya of Bessarabia. The remaining portion was preserved as Moldova. In the 17th century, Transnistria was governed by the Principality of Moldova but was never a part of it. Today, the western part of Transnistria is in the Republic of Moldavia while the rest is in Ukraine, as is most of Bugeac (north of Bucovina) and Pocutia.

Coat of arms of Moldavia

Coat of arms of Bukovina

Coat of arms of Basarabia

== Coats of arms of local authorities ==
=== Coats of arms of the counties in the interwar period (1926–1938 and 1940–1947) ===
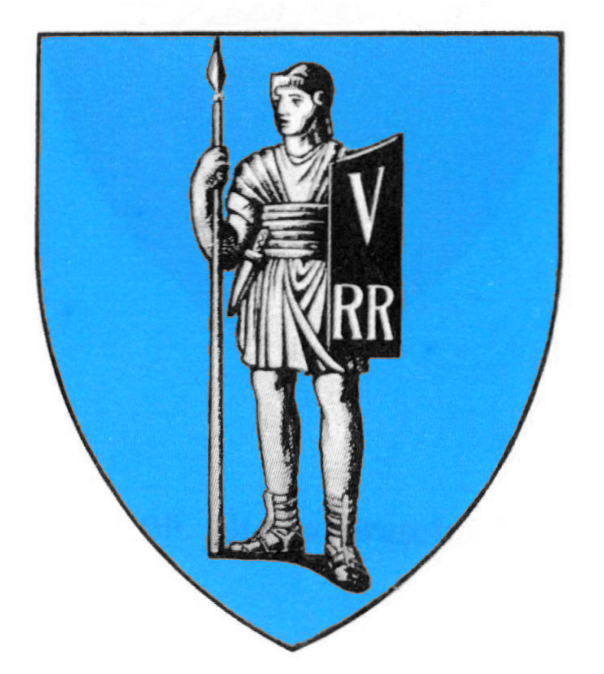
Alba

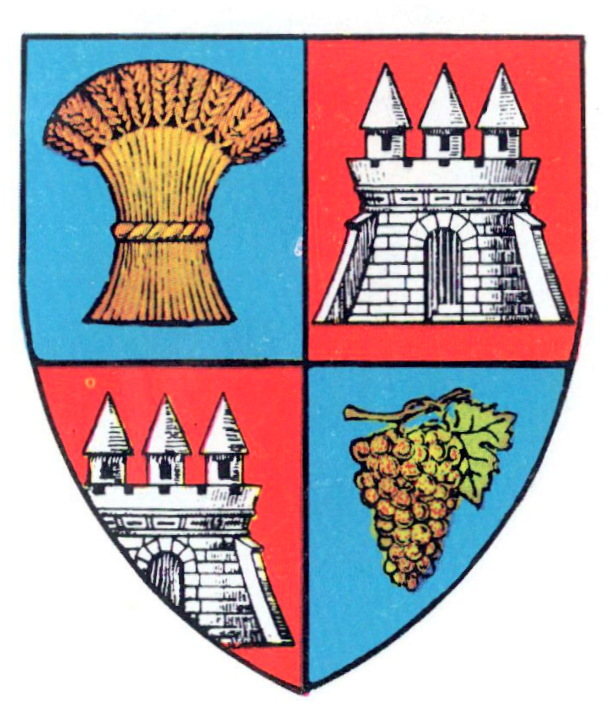
Arad

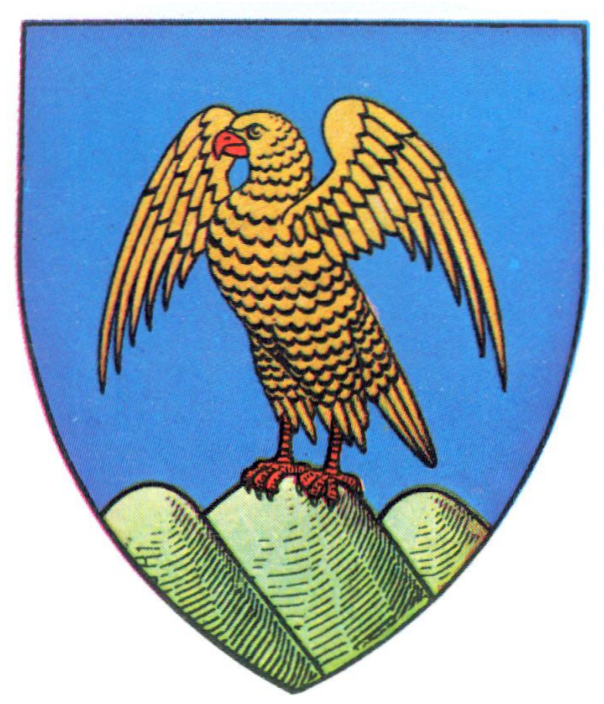
Argeș

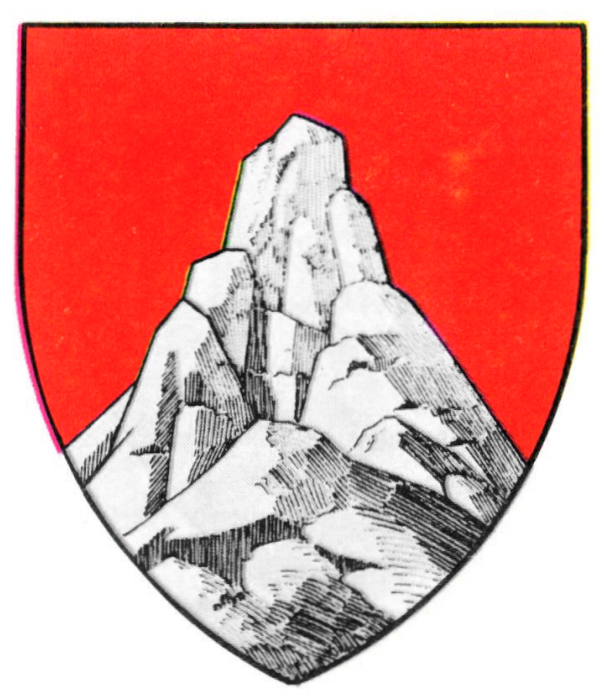
Bacău

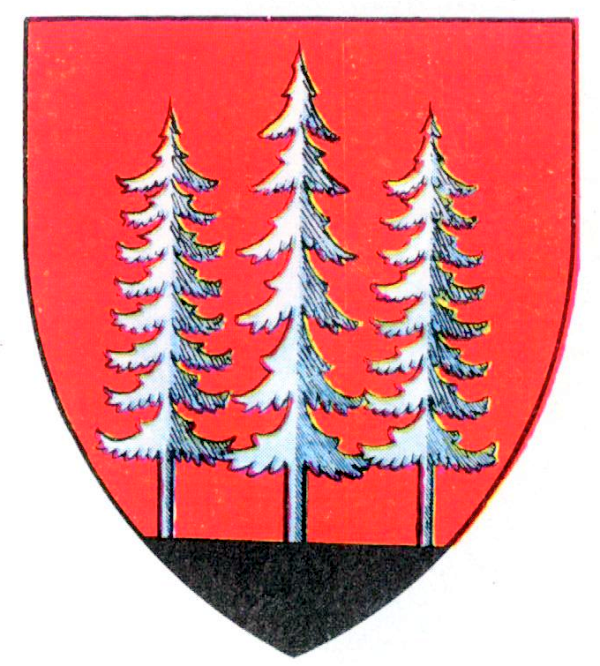
Baia

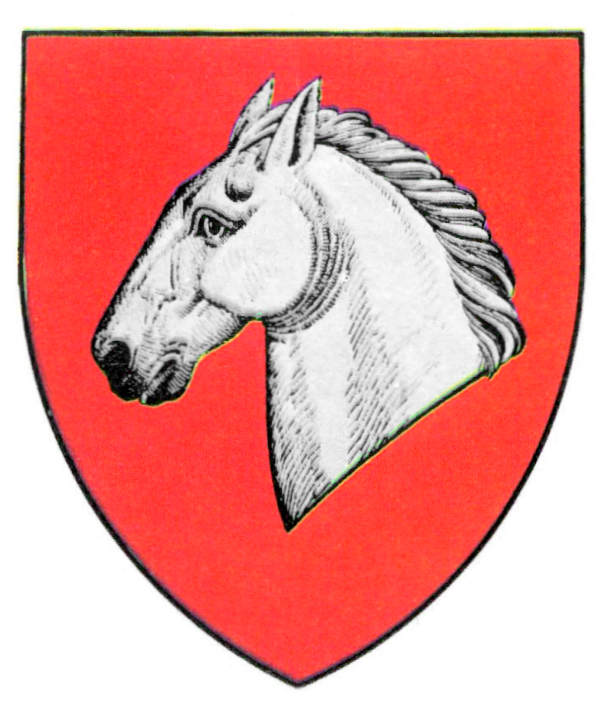
Bălți

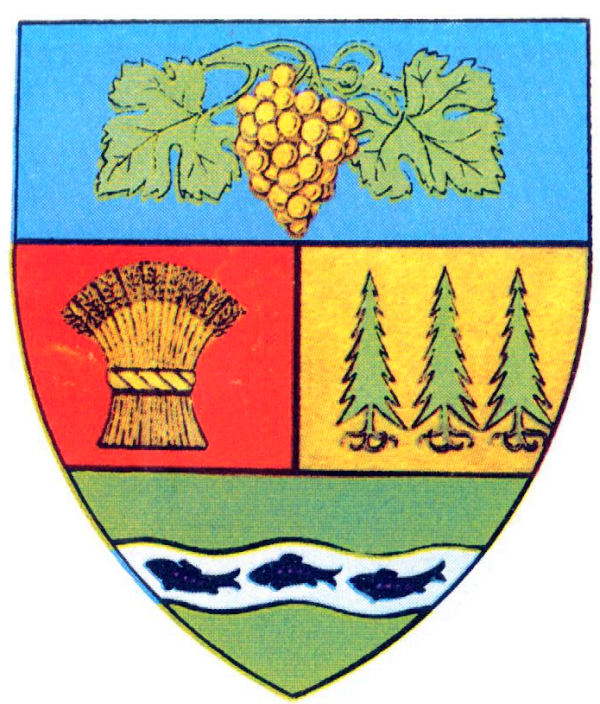
Bihor

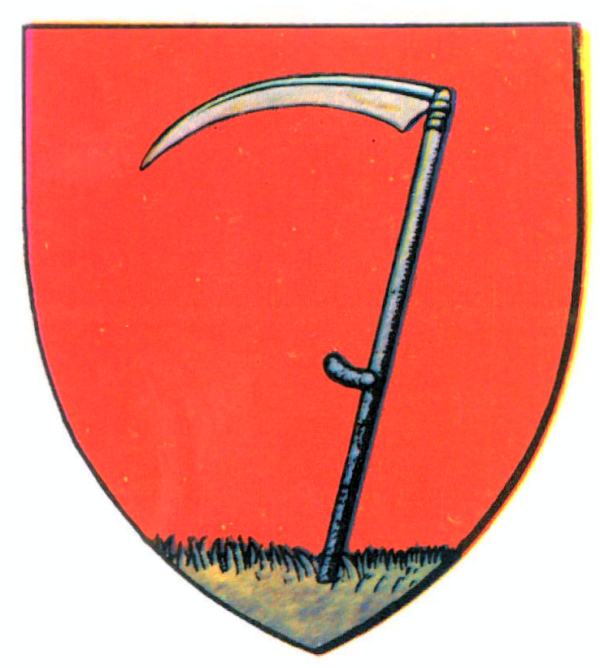
Botoșani

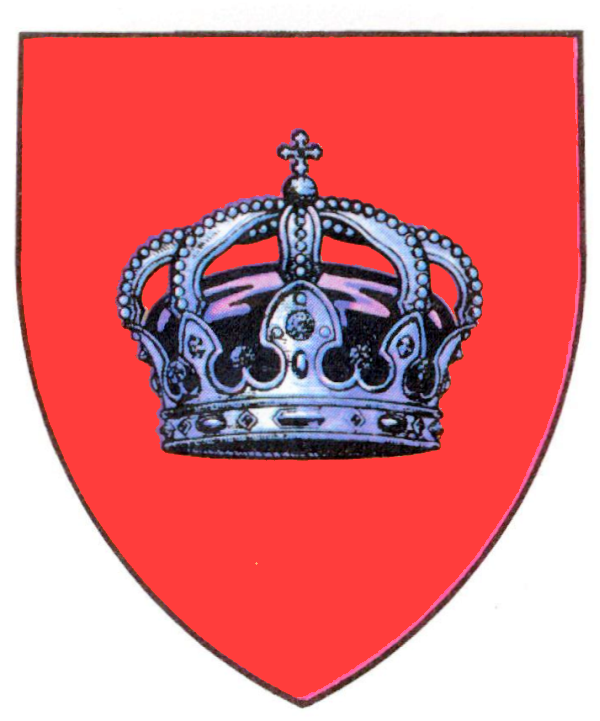
Brașov

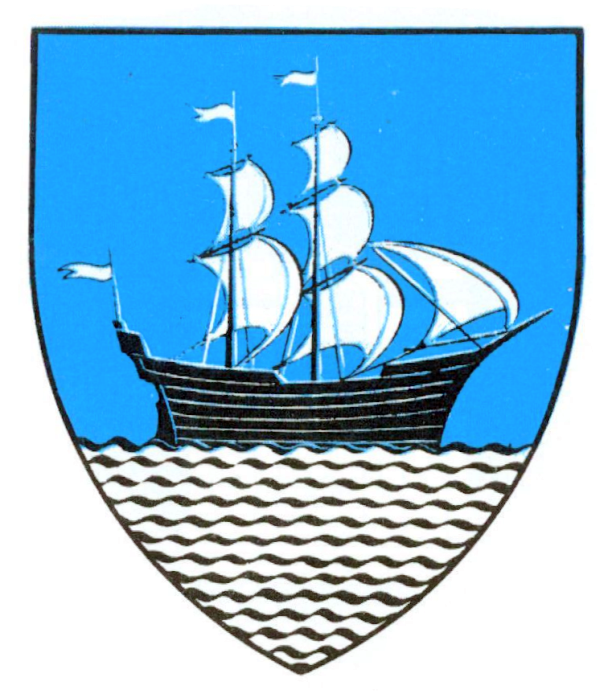
Brăila

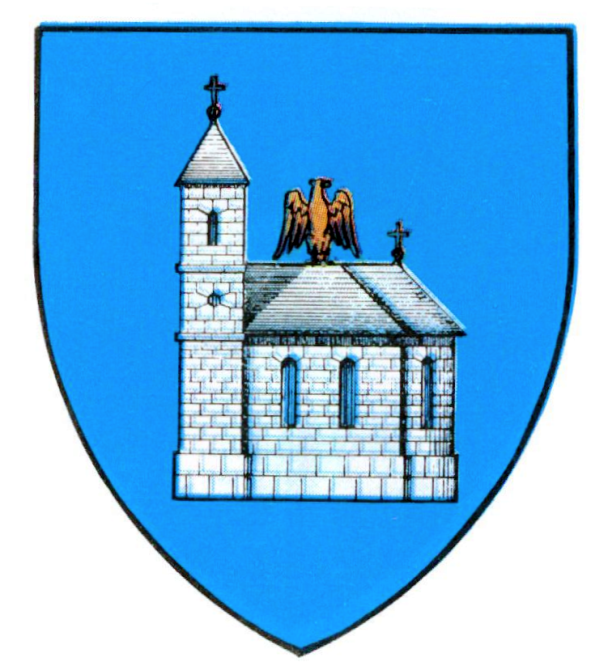
Buzău

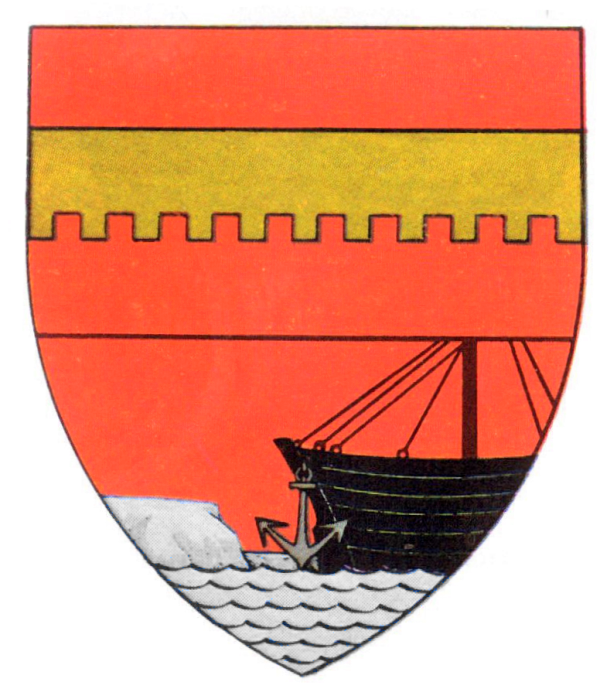
Cahul

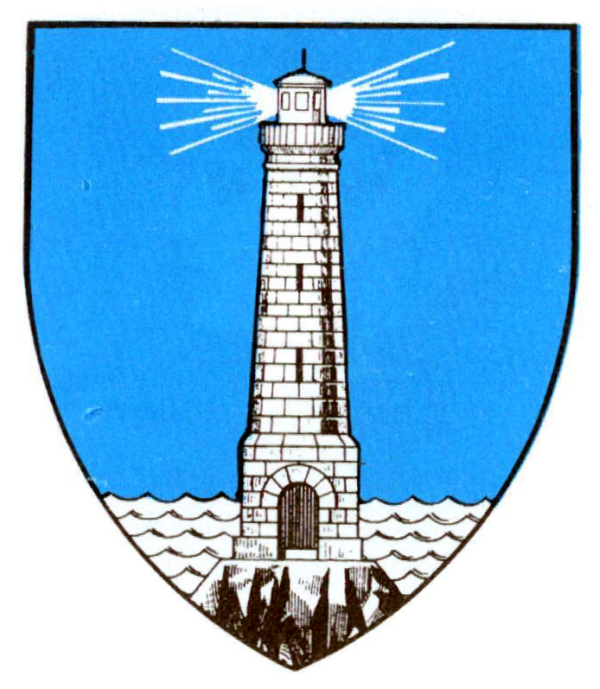
Caliacra

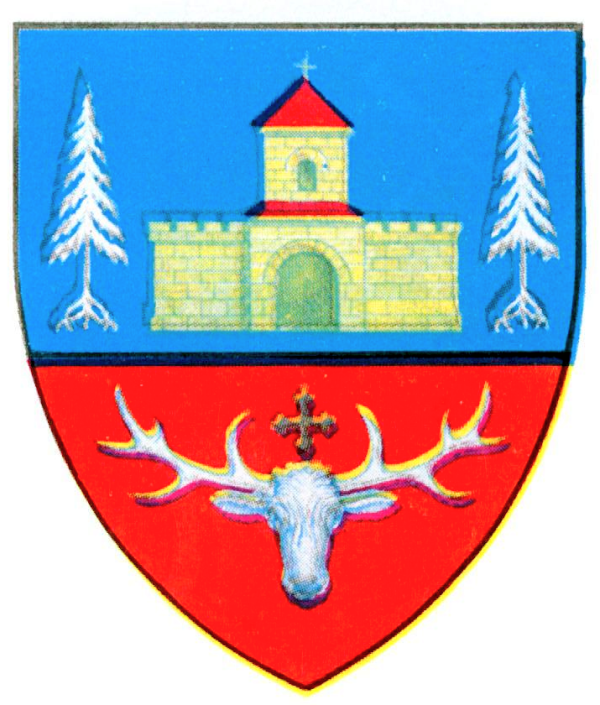
Câmpulung

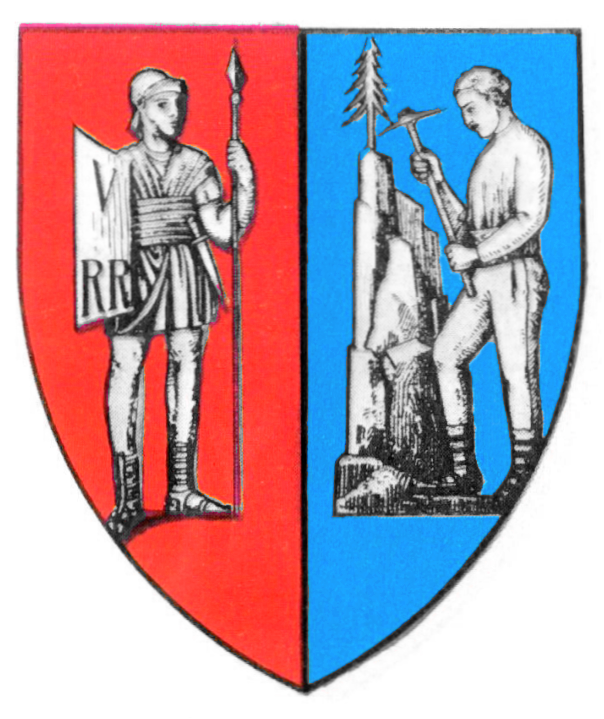
Caraș

Cernăuți

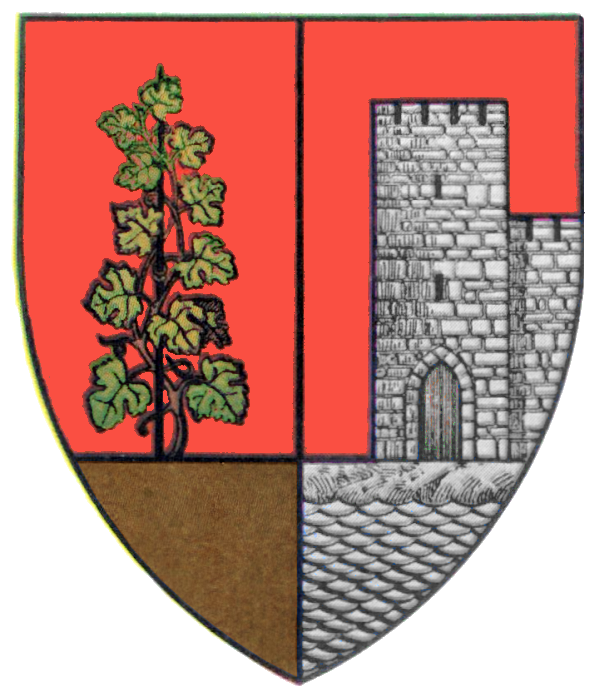
Cetatea Albă

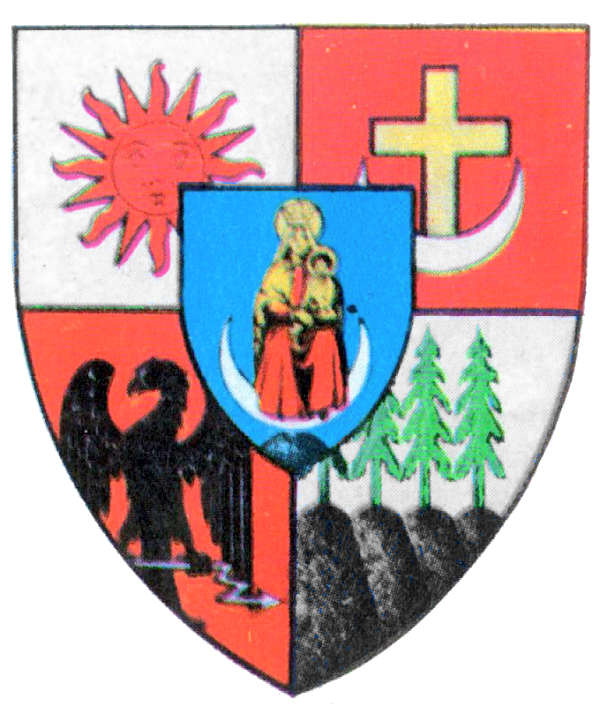
Ciuc

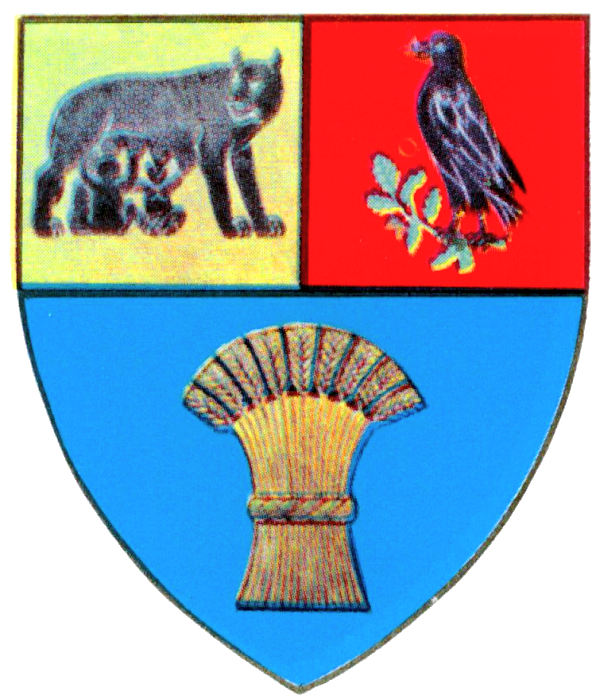
Cluj

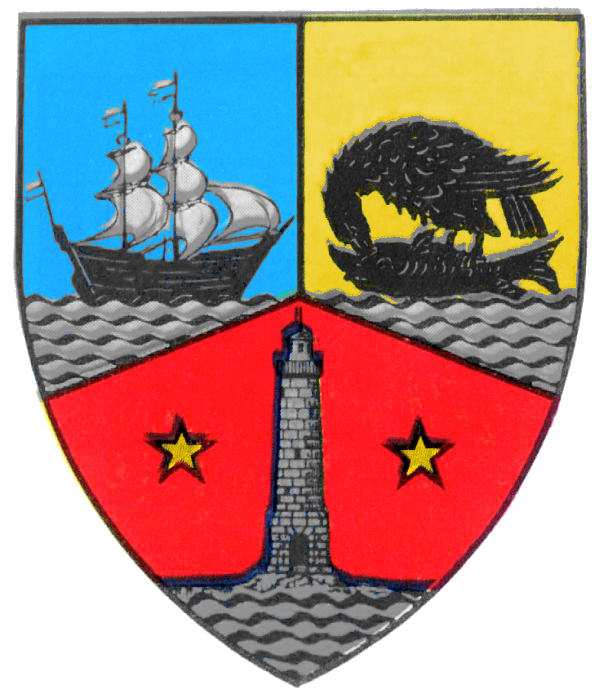
Constanța

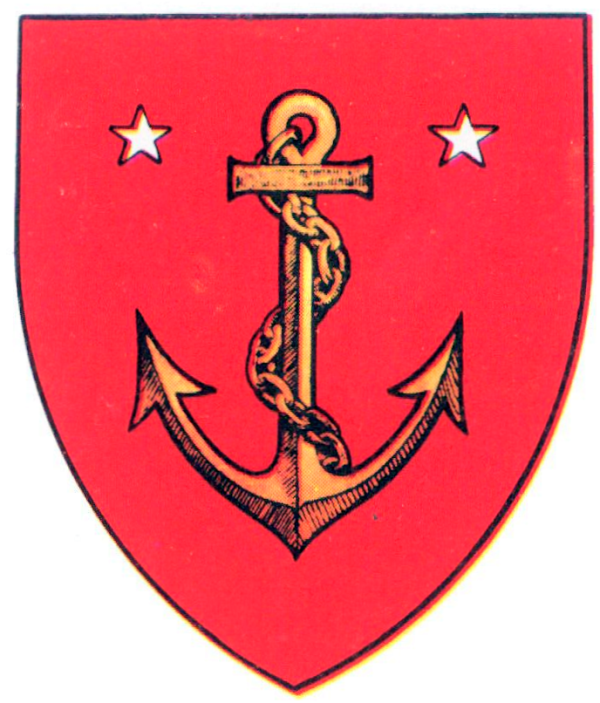
Covurlui

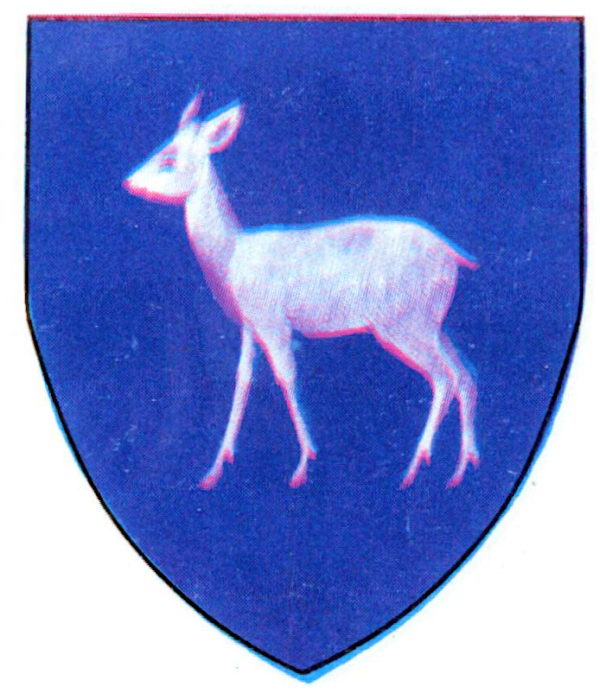
Dâmbovița

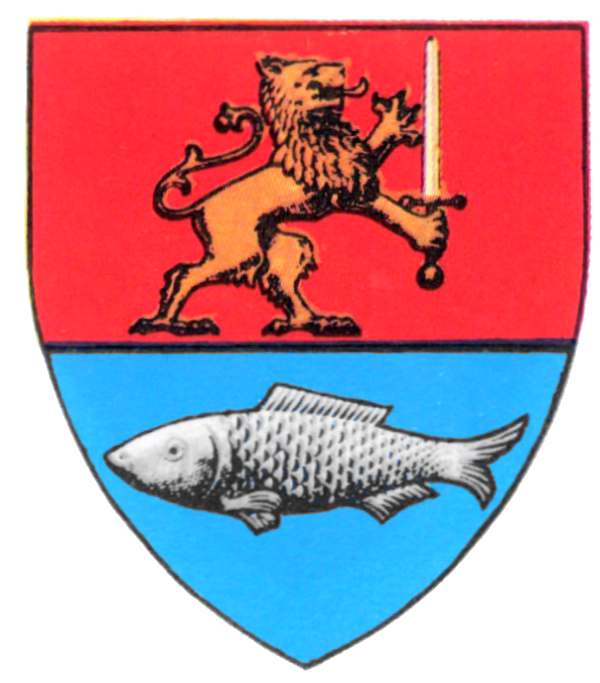
Dolj

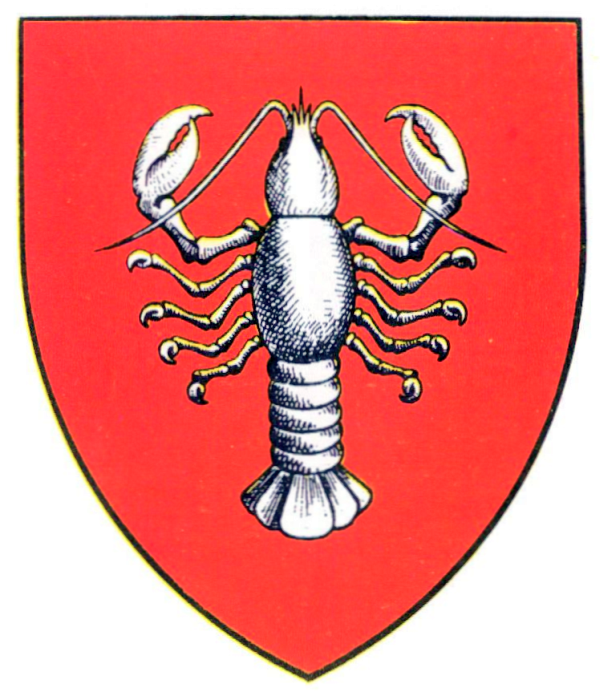
Dorohoi

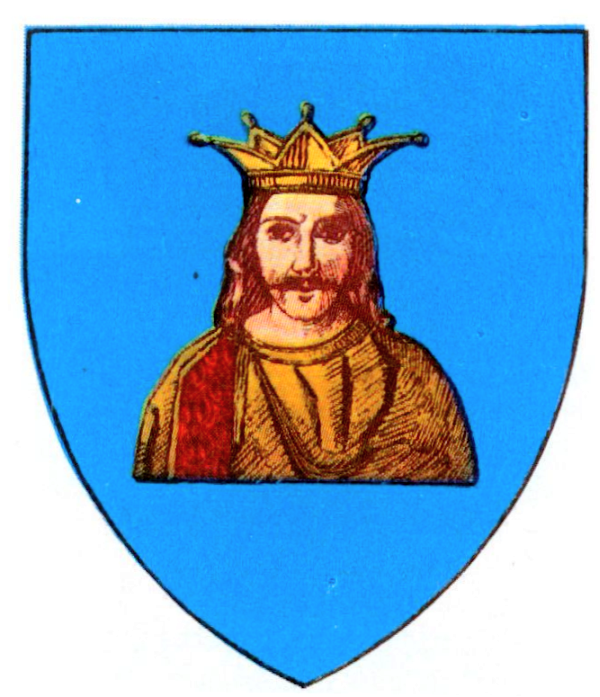
Durostor

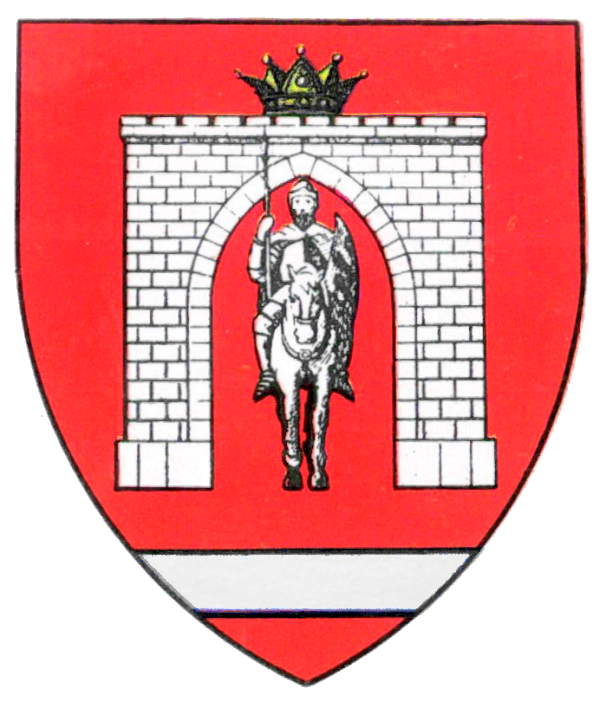
Făgăraș

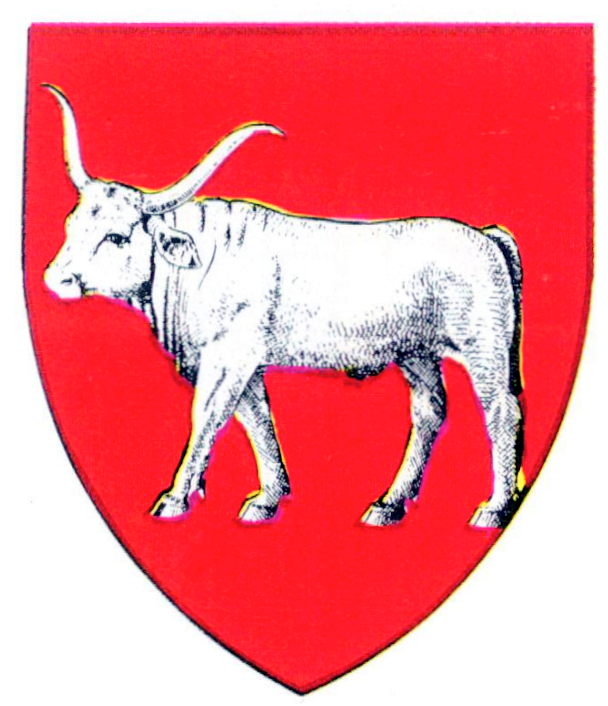
Fălciu

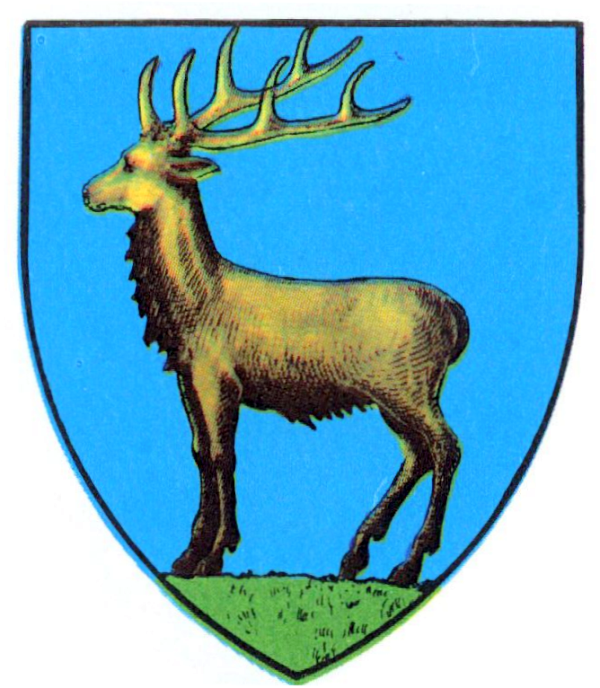
Gorj

Hotin

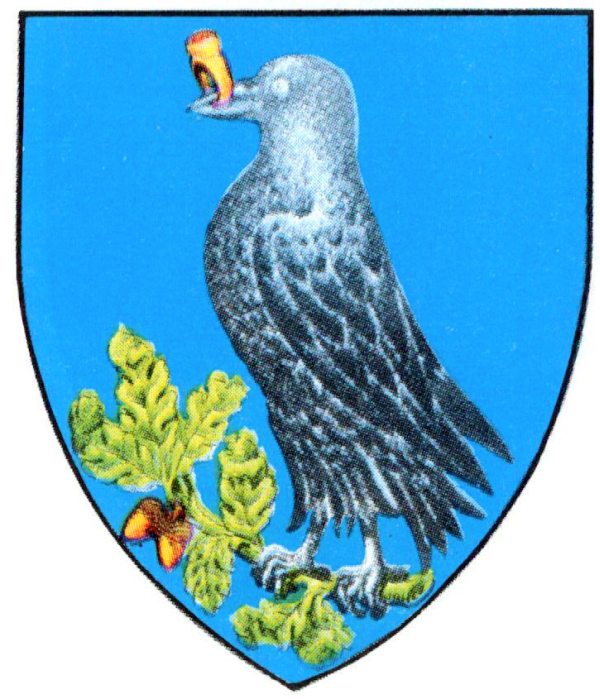
Hunedoara

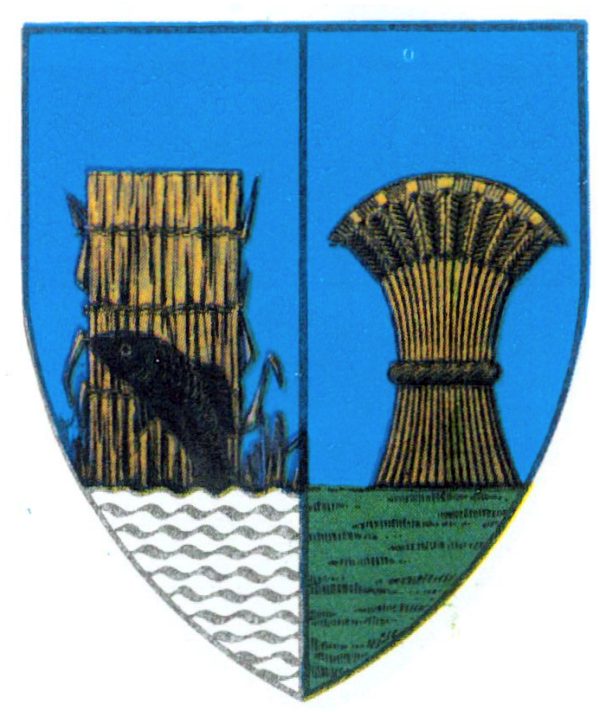
Ialomița

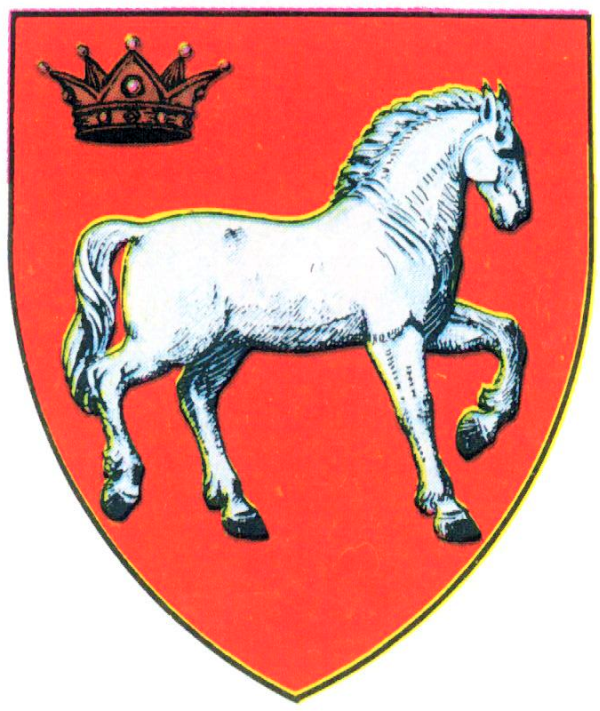
Iași

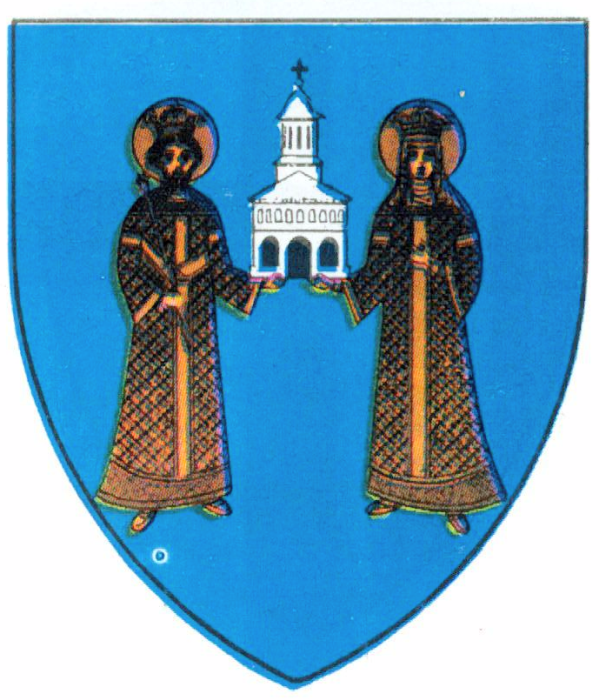
Ilfov

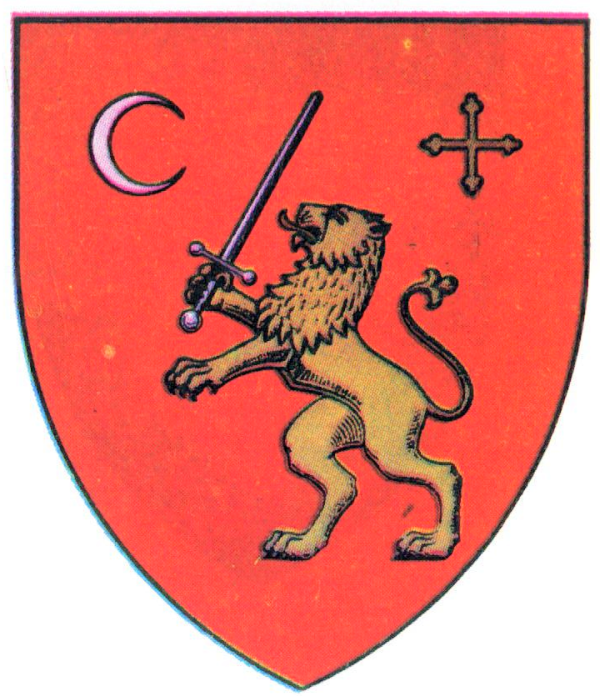
Ismail

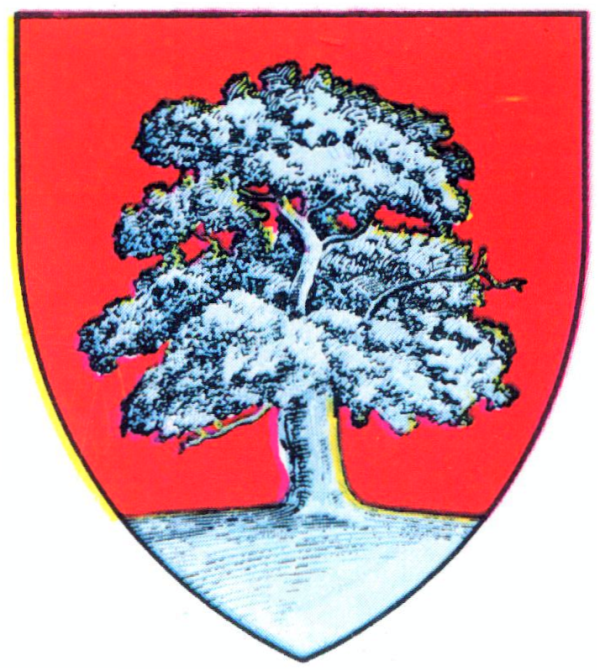
Lăpușna

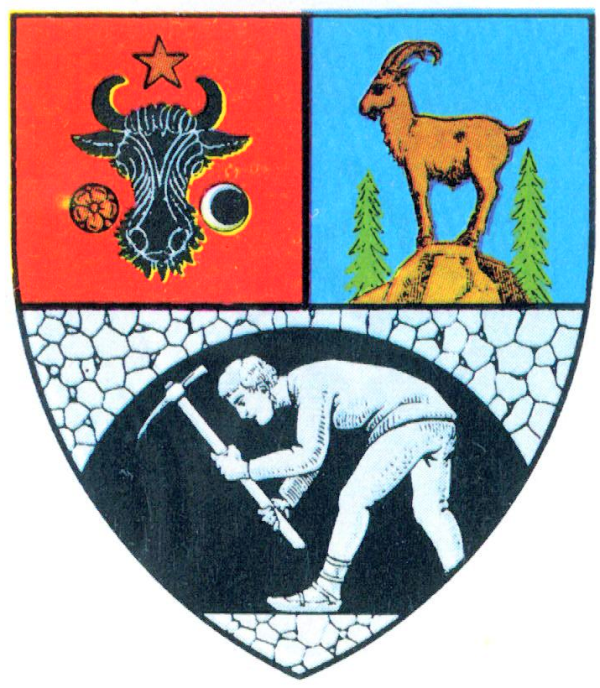
Maramureș

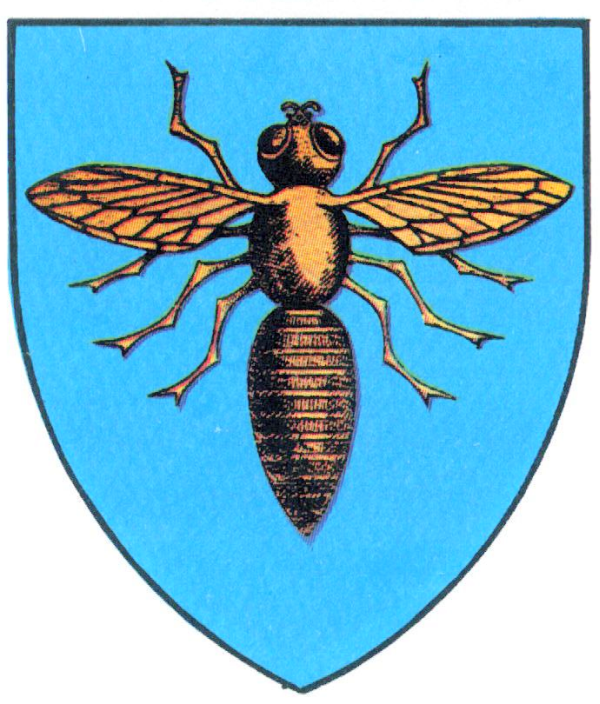
Mehedinți

Mureș

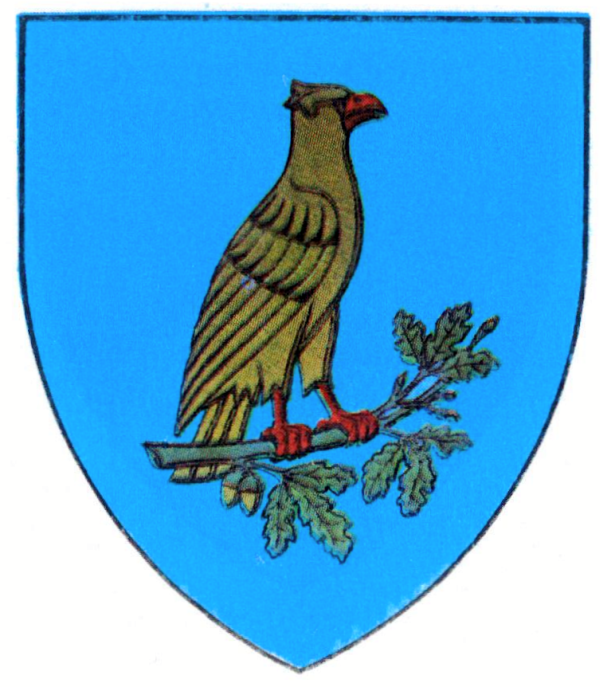
Muscel

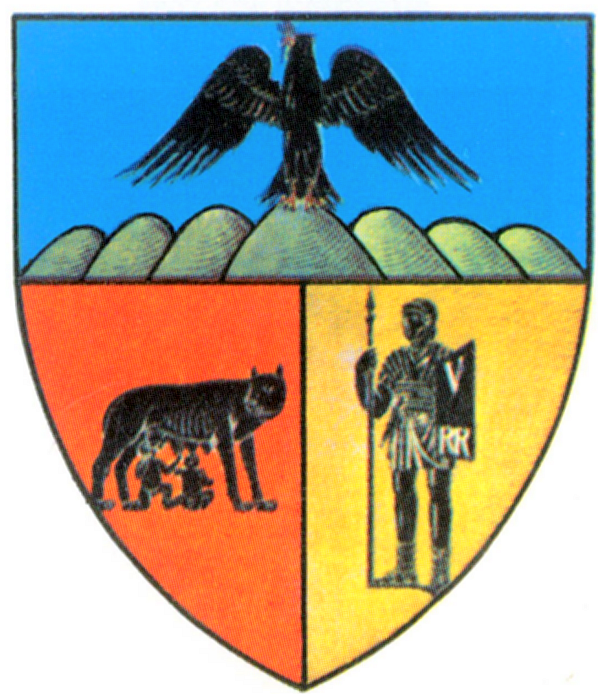
Năsăud

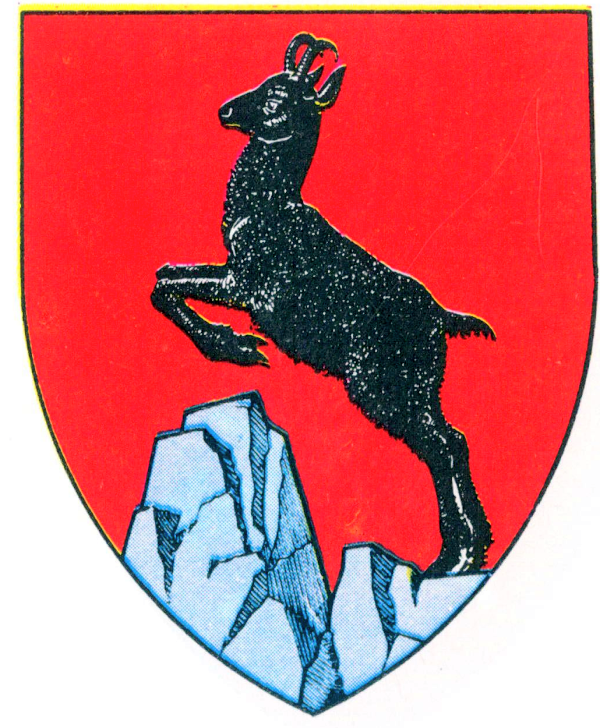
Neamț

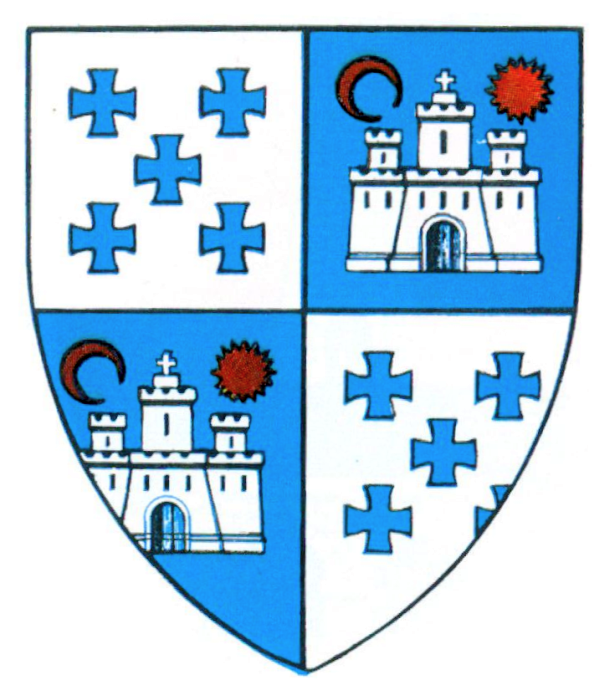
Odorhei

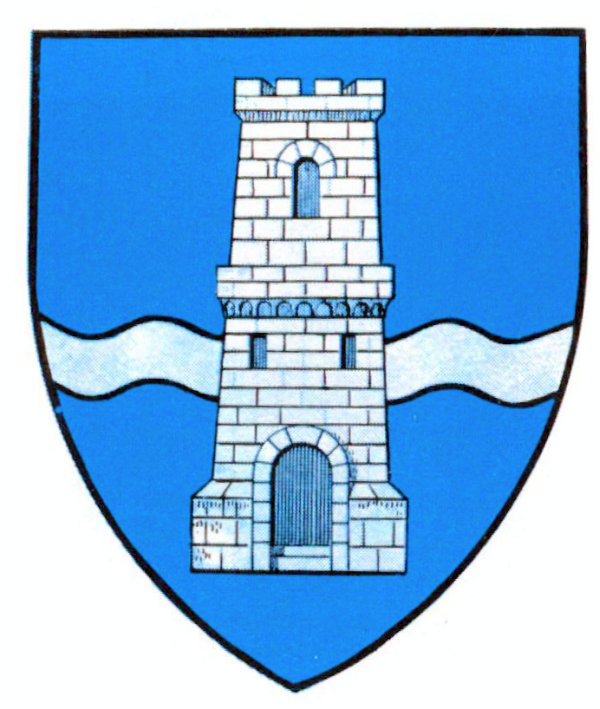
Olt

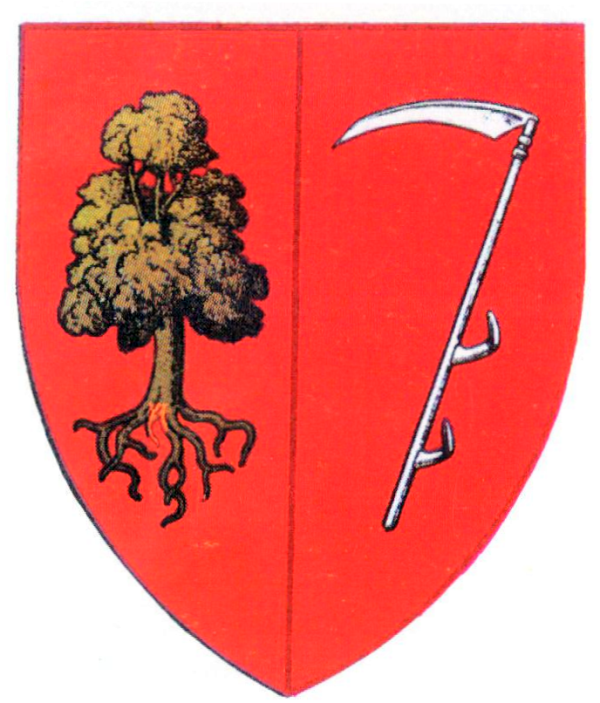
Orhei

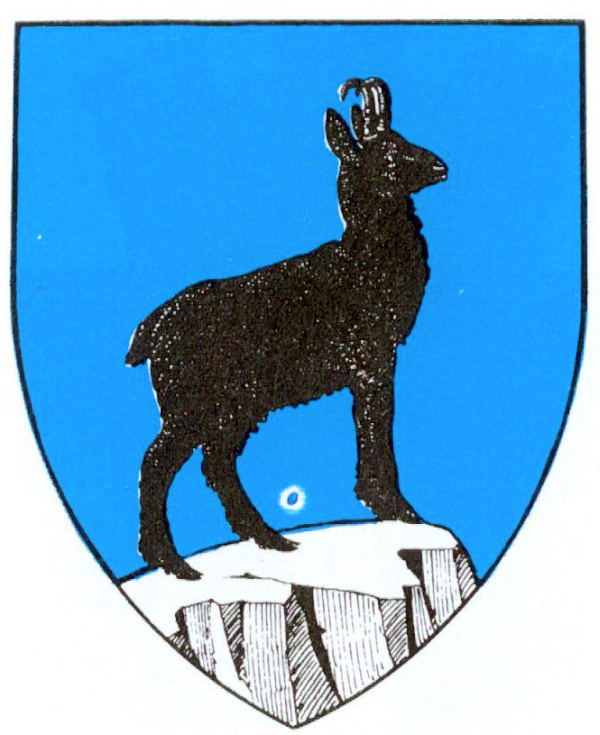
Prahova

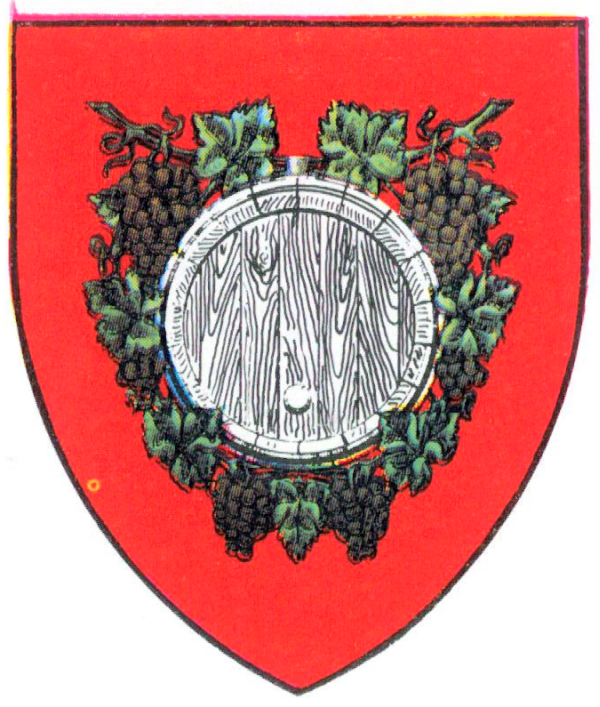
Putna

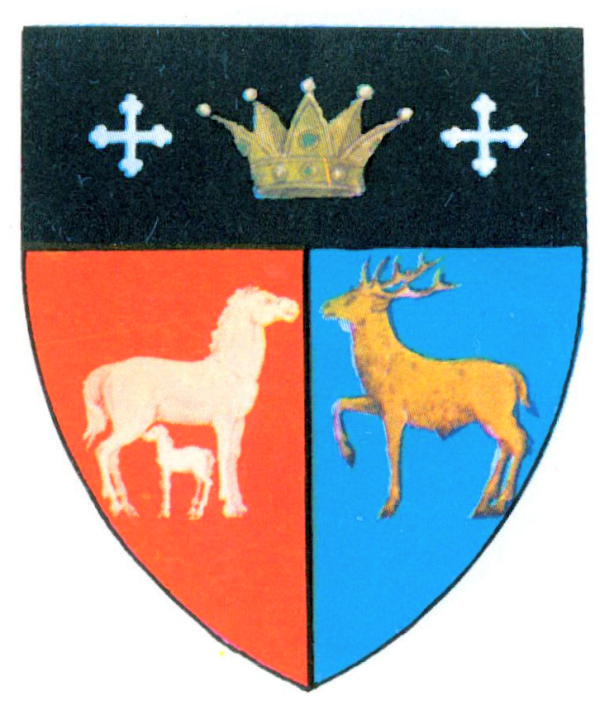
Rădăuți

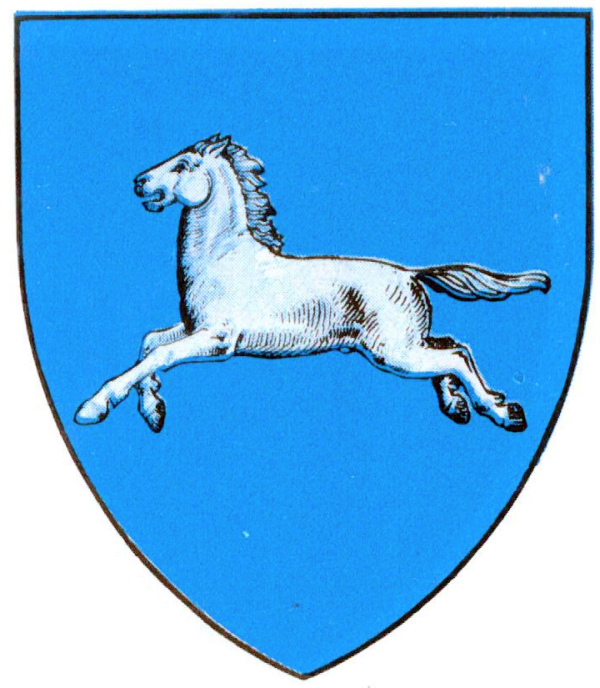
Râmnicu Sărat

Roman

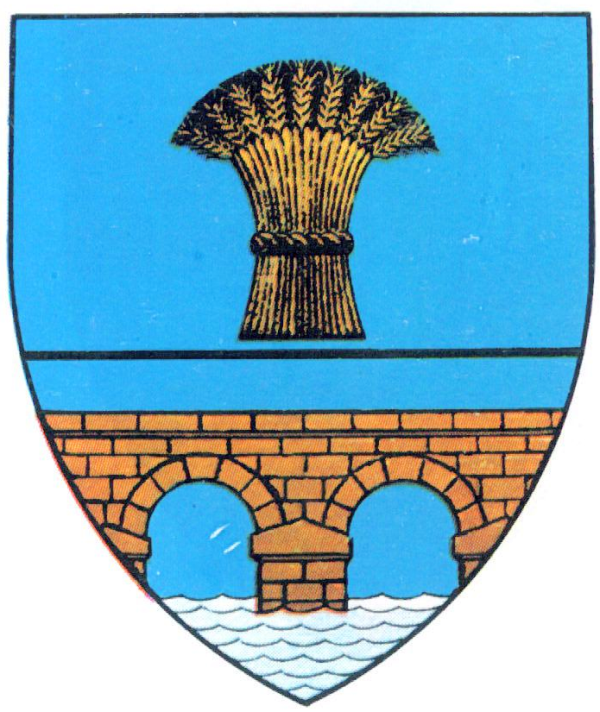
Romanați

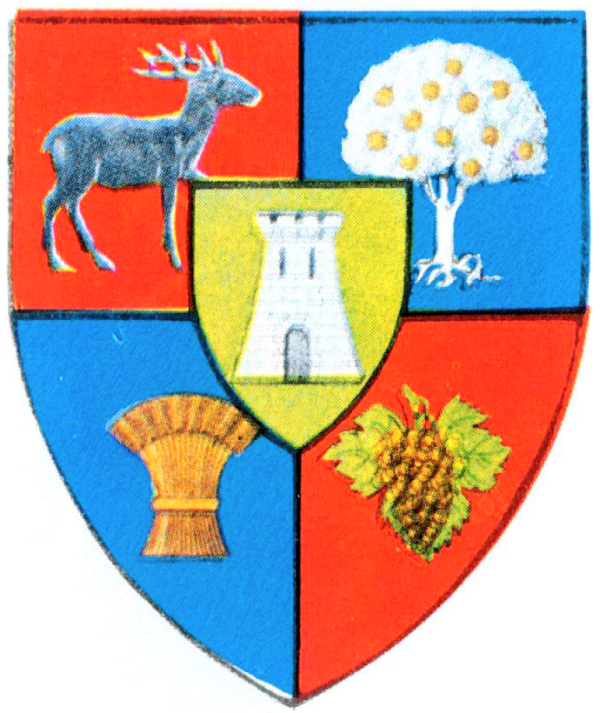
Satu Mare

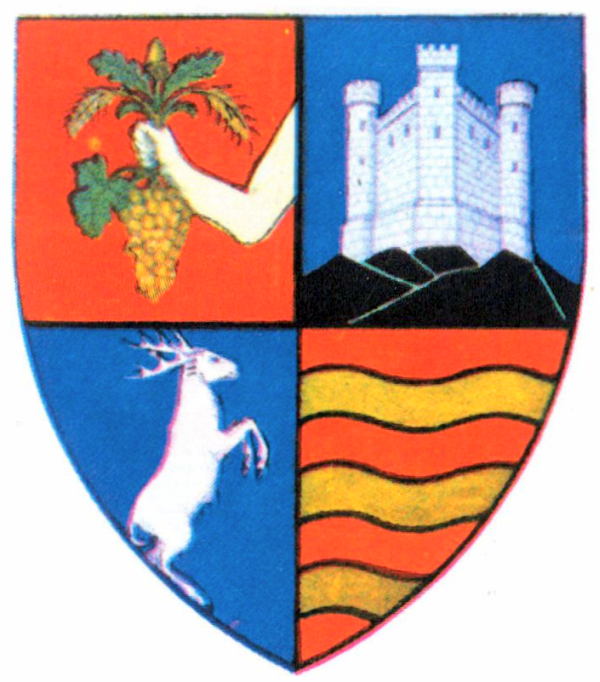
Sălaj

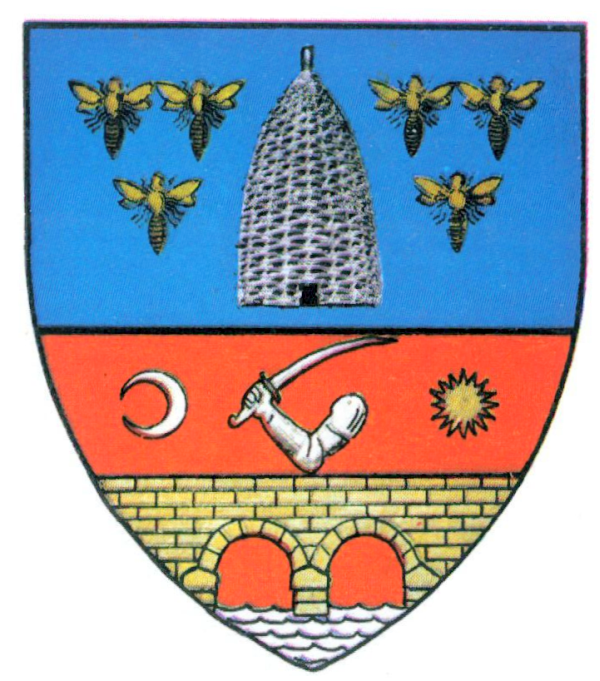
Severin

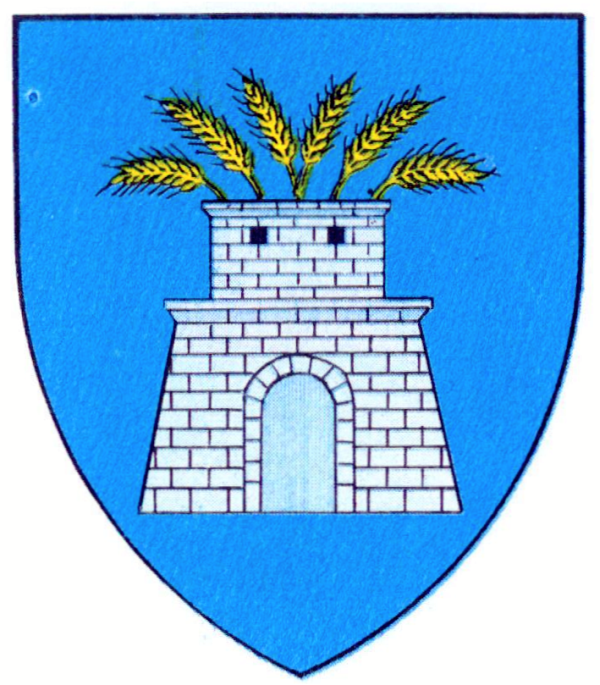
Sibiu

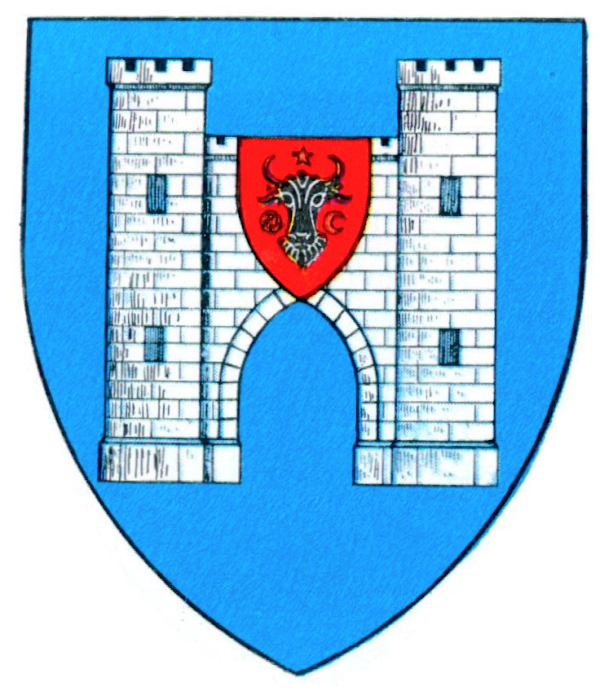
Someș

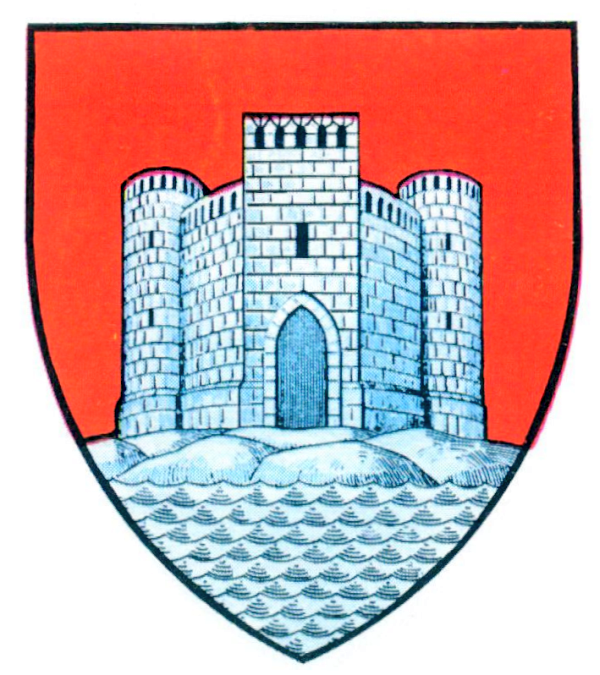
Soroca

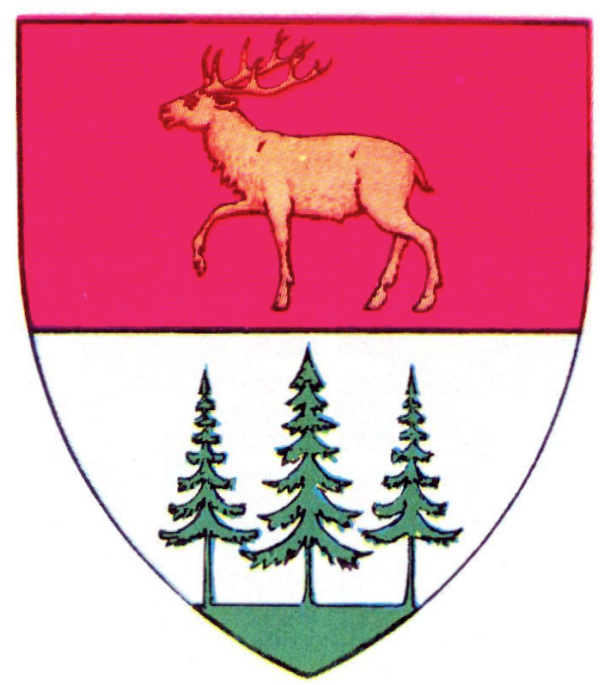
Storojineț

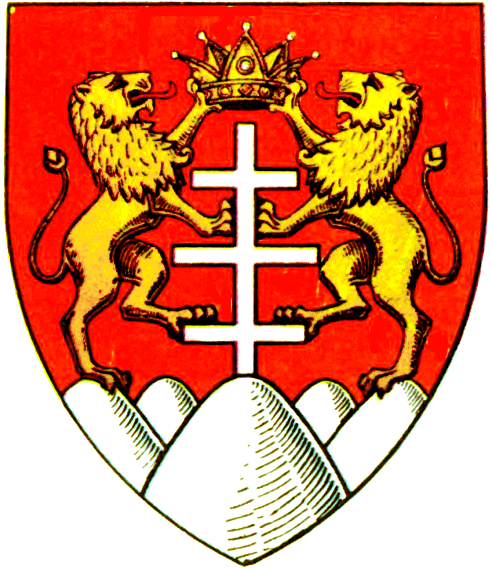
Suceava

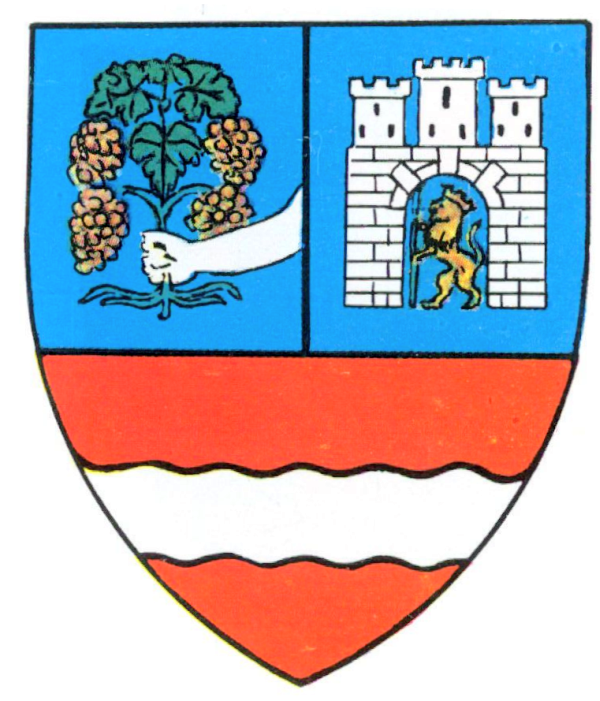
Târnava-Mare

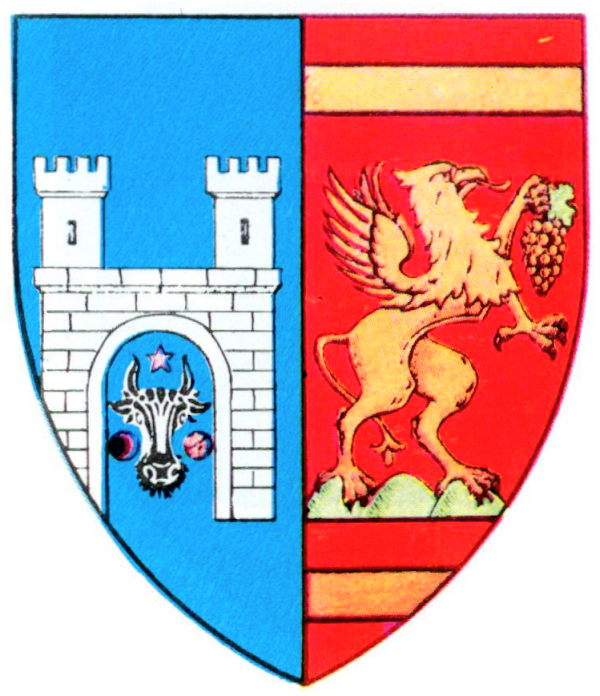
Târnava-Mică

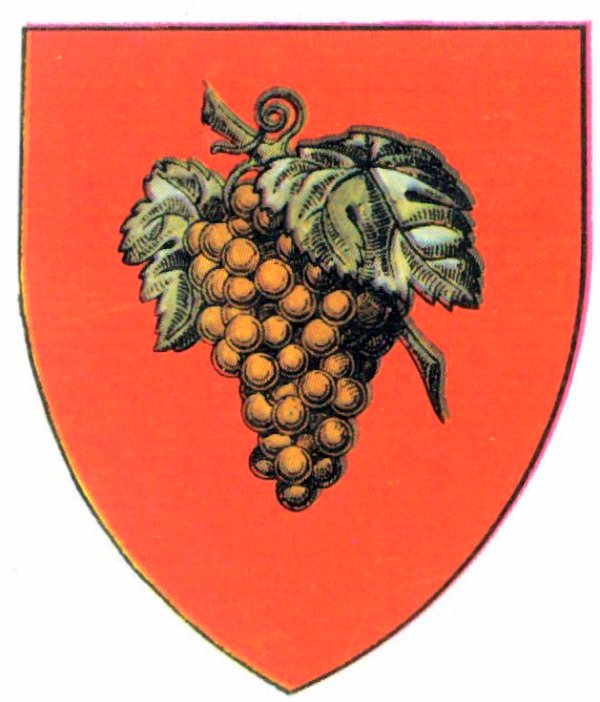
Tecuci

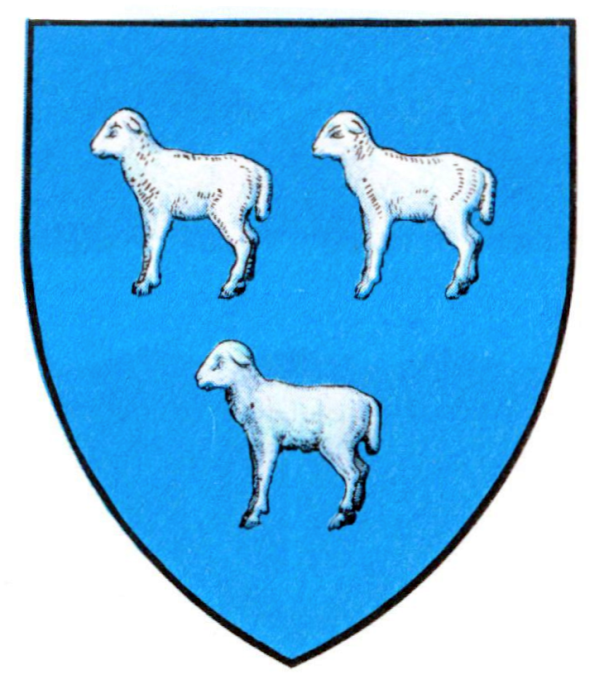
Teleorman

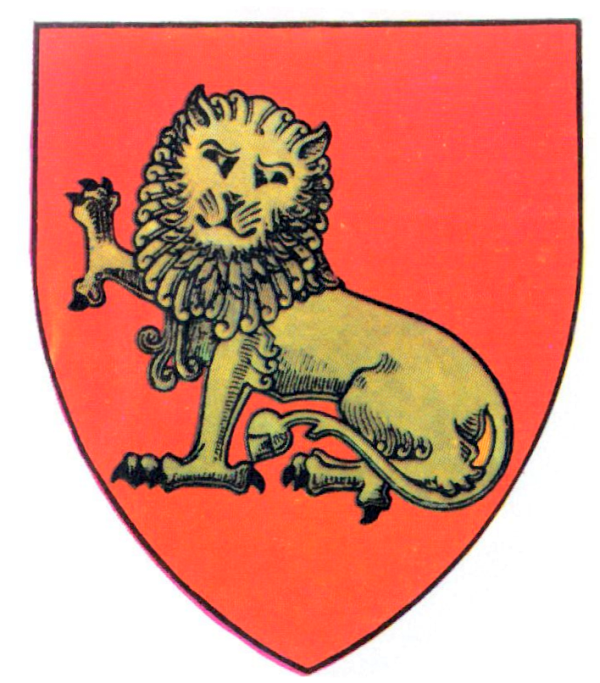
Tighina

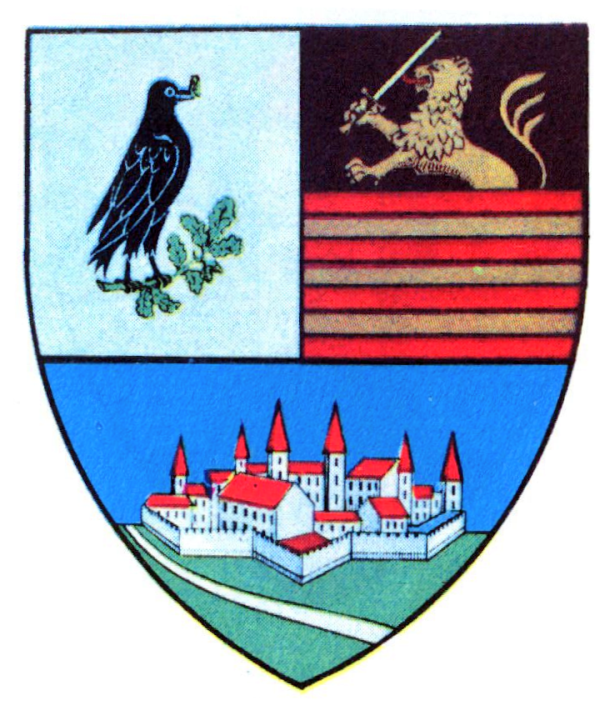
Timiș-Torontal

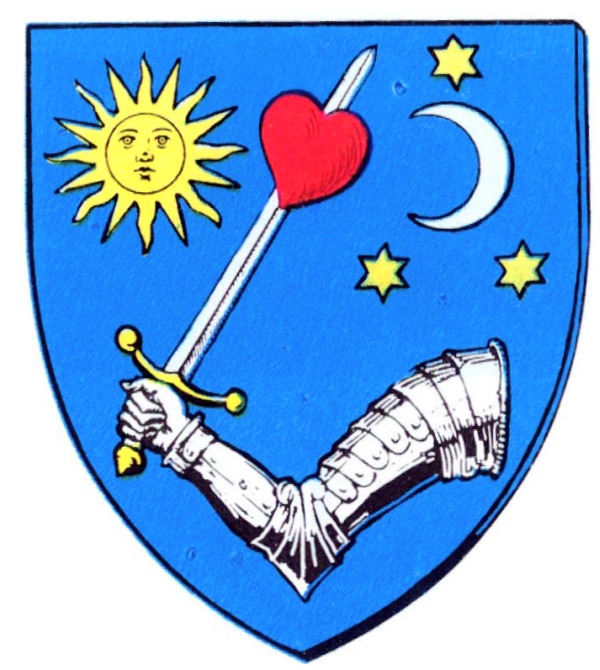
Trei Scaune

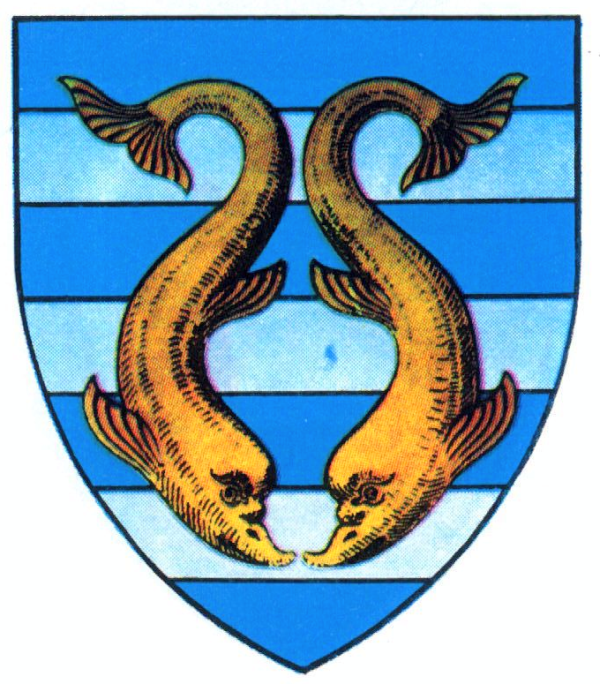
Tulcea

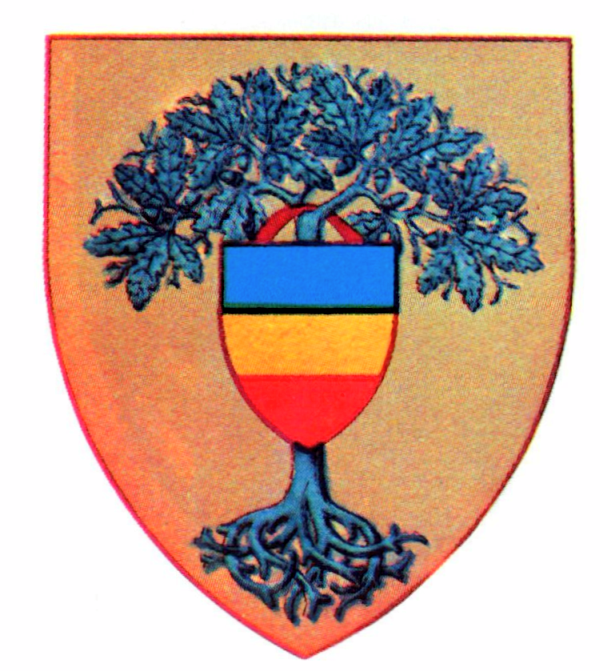
Turda

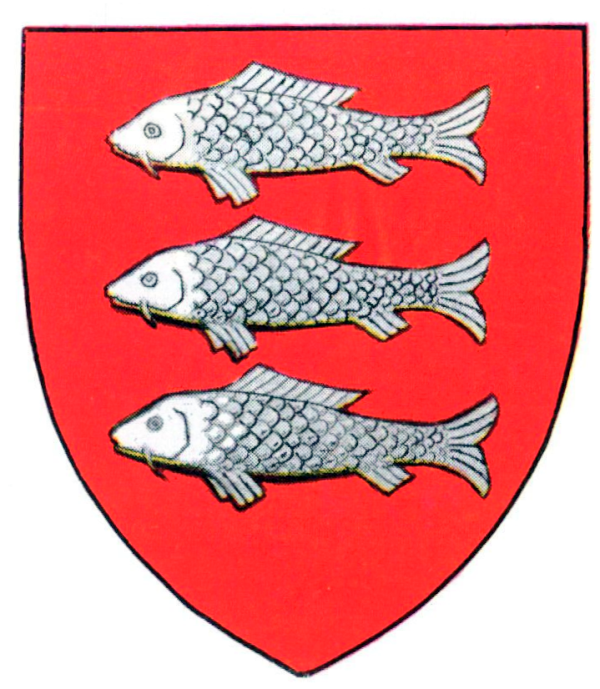
Tutova

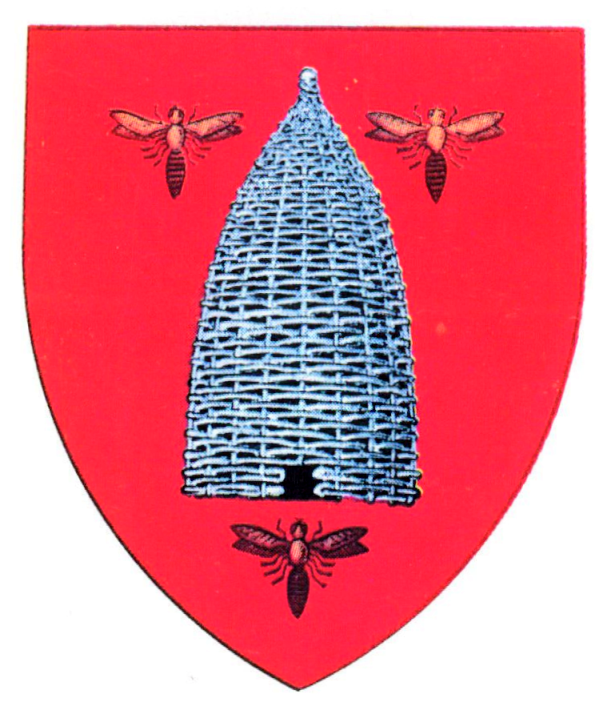
Vaslui

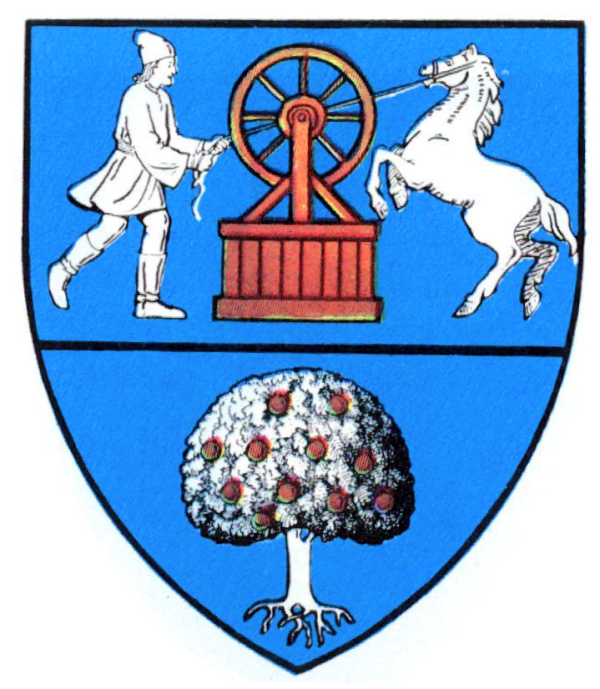
Vâlcea

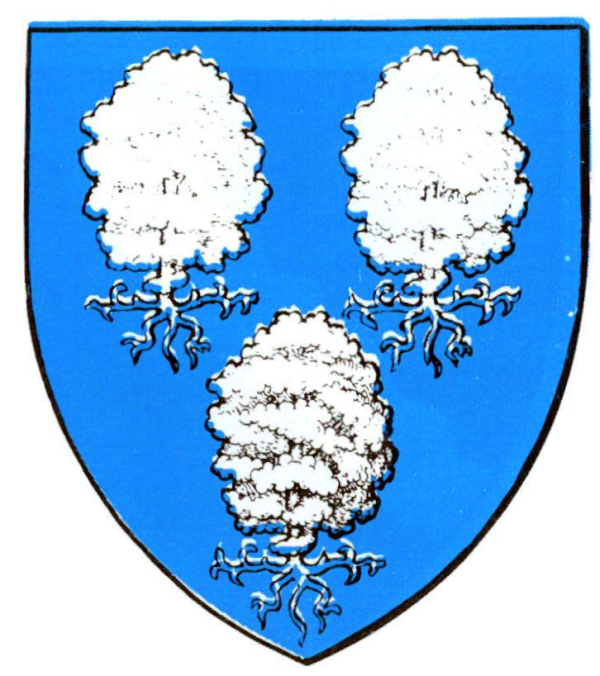
Vlașca

=== Coats of arms of the ținuturi (lands) between 1938 and 1940 ===
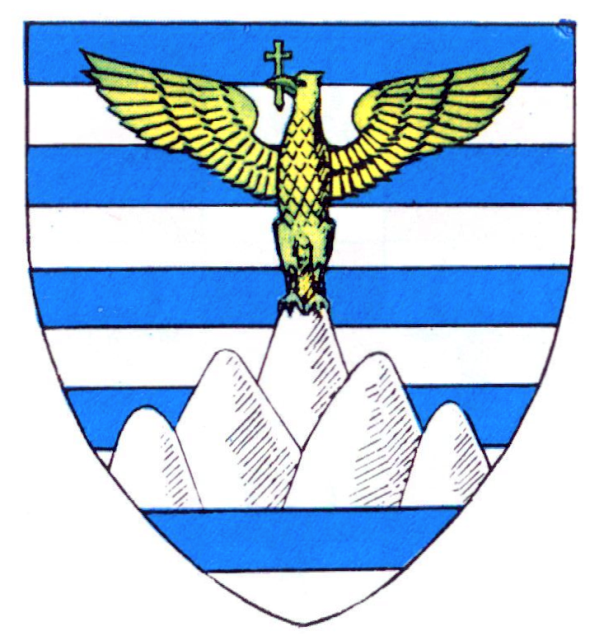
Ținutul Argeș (Ținutul Bucegi)

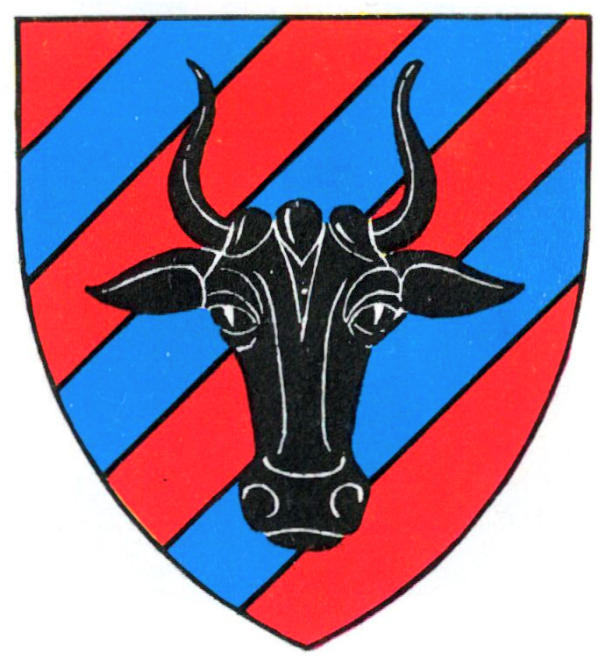
Ținutul Crișuri (Ținutul Someș)

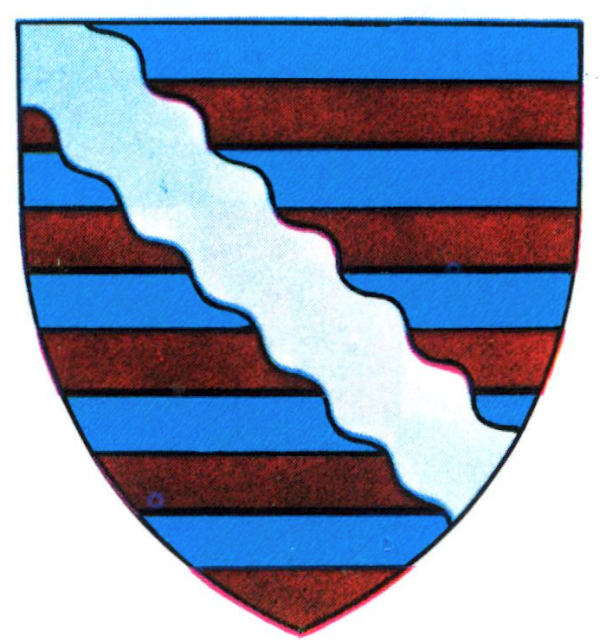
Ținutul Dunării (Ținutul Dunărea de Jos)

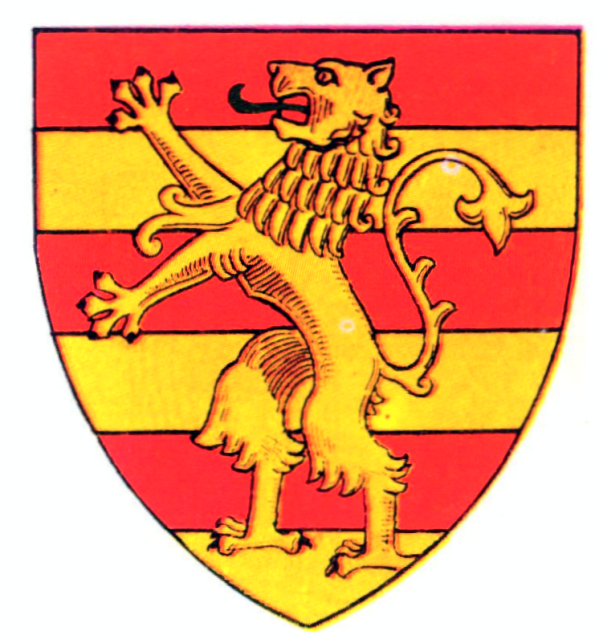
Ținutul Jiu (Ținutul Olt)

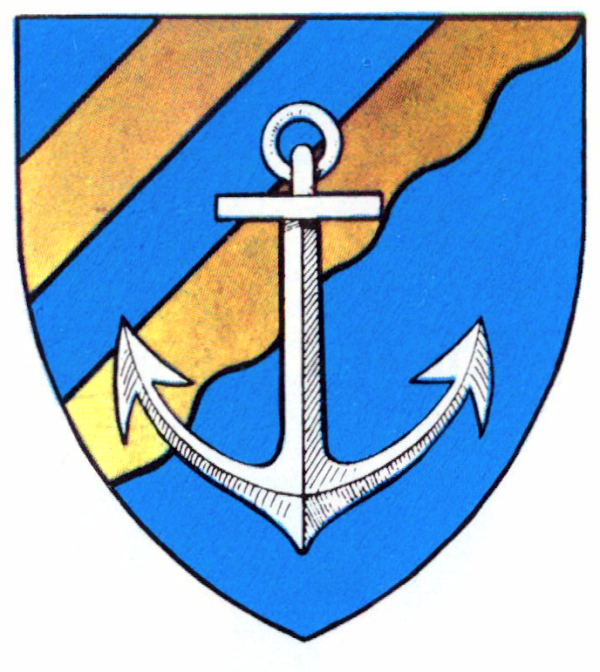
Ținutul Mării

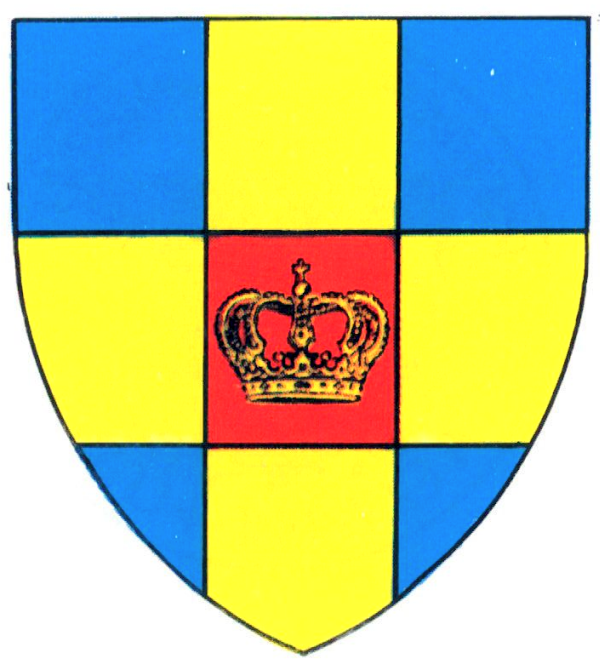
Ținutul Mureș (Ținutul Alba Iulia)

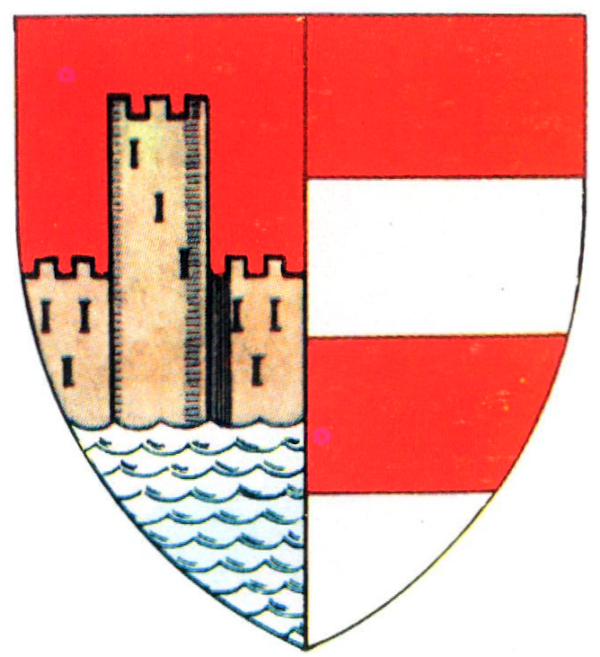
Ținutul Nistru

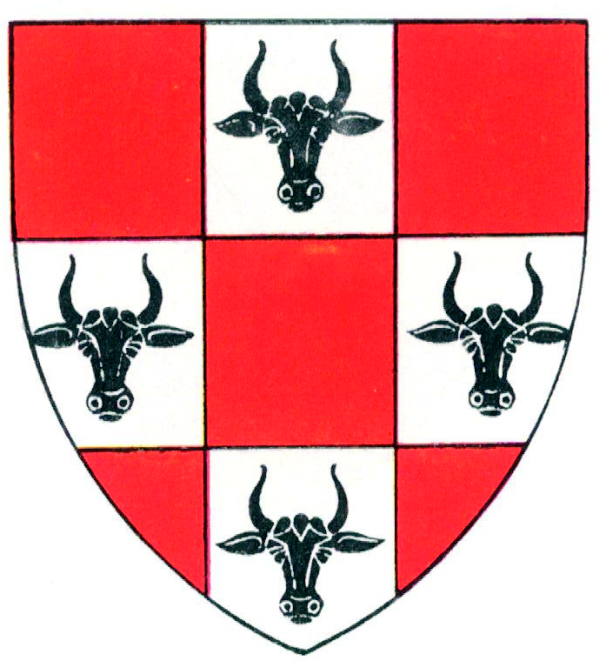
Ținutul Prut

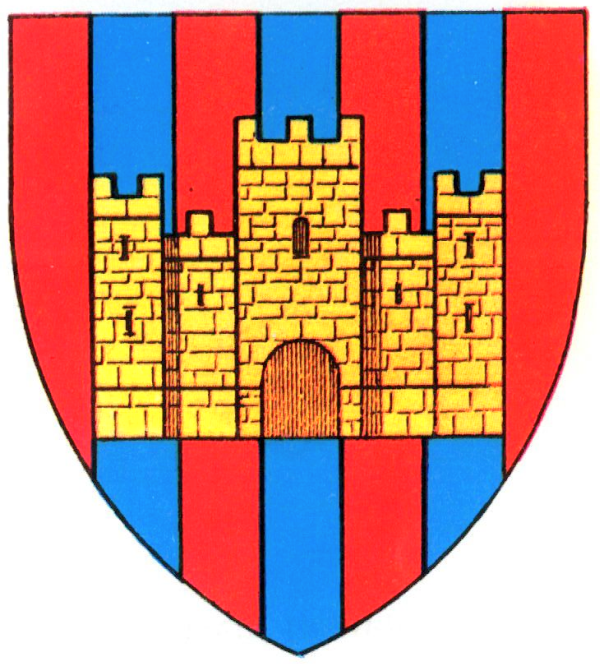
Ținutul Suceava

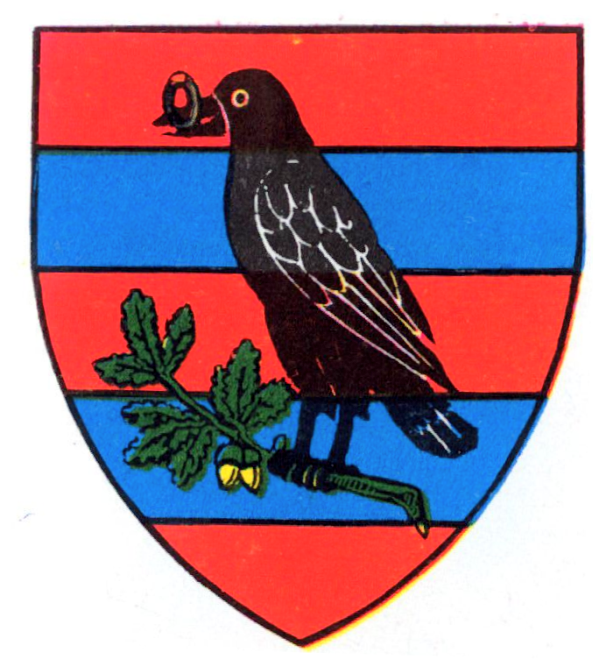
Ținutul Timiș

=== Coats of arms of the counties ===
Alba

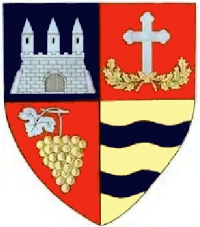
Arad

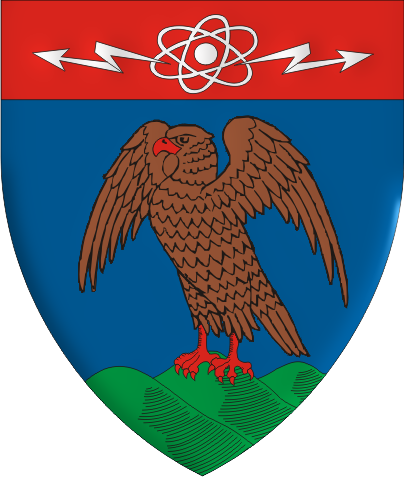
Argeș

Bacău

Bihor

Bistrița Năsăud

Botoșani

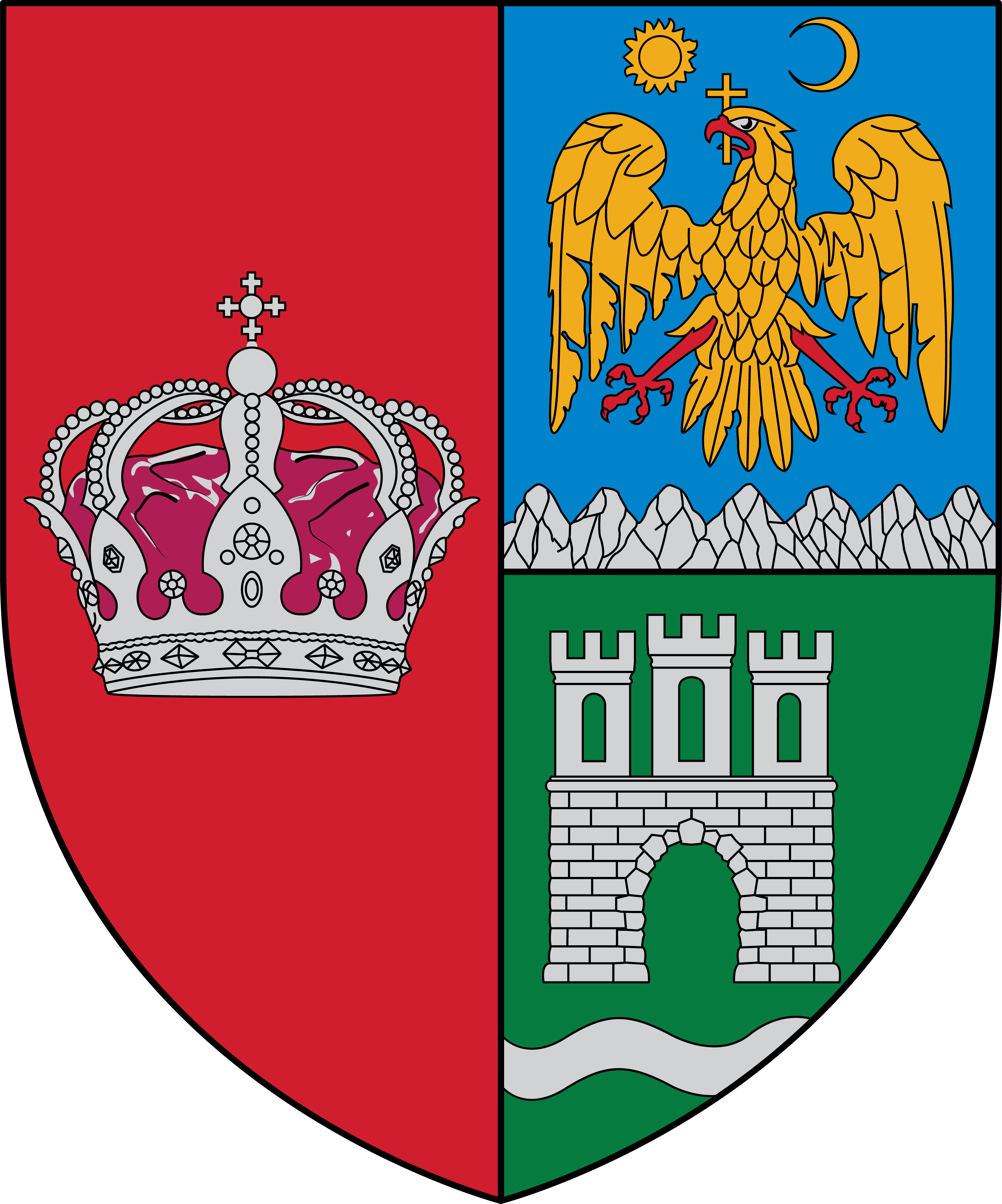
Brașov

Brăila

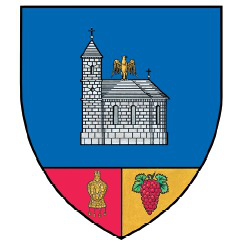
Buzău

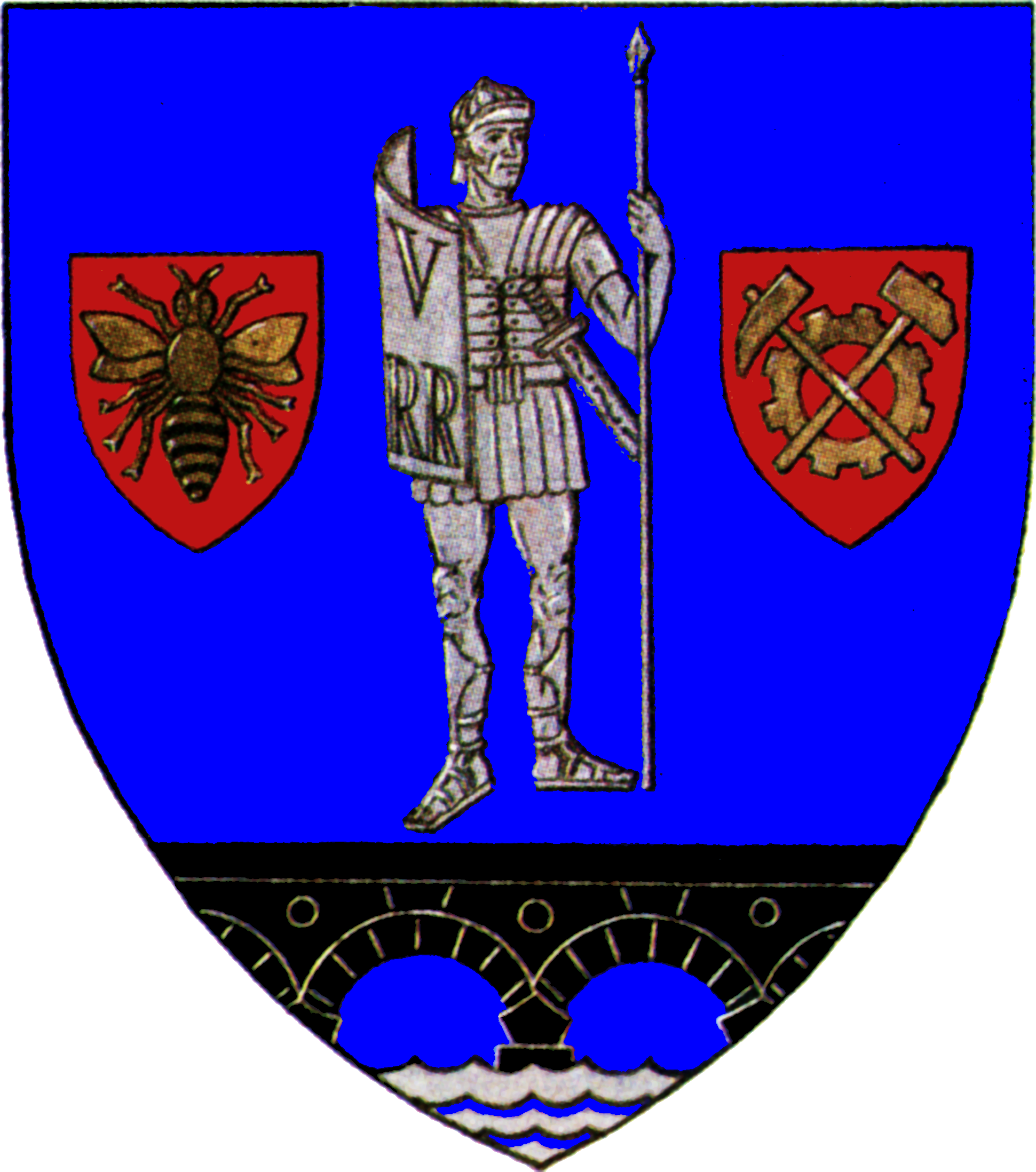
Caraş-Severin

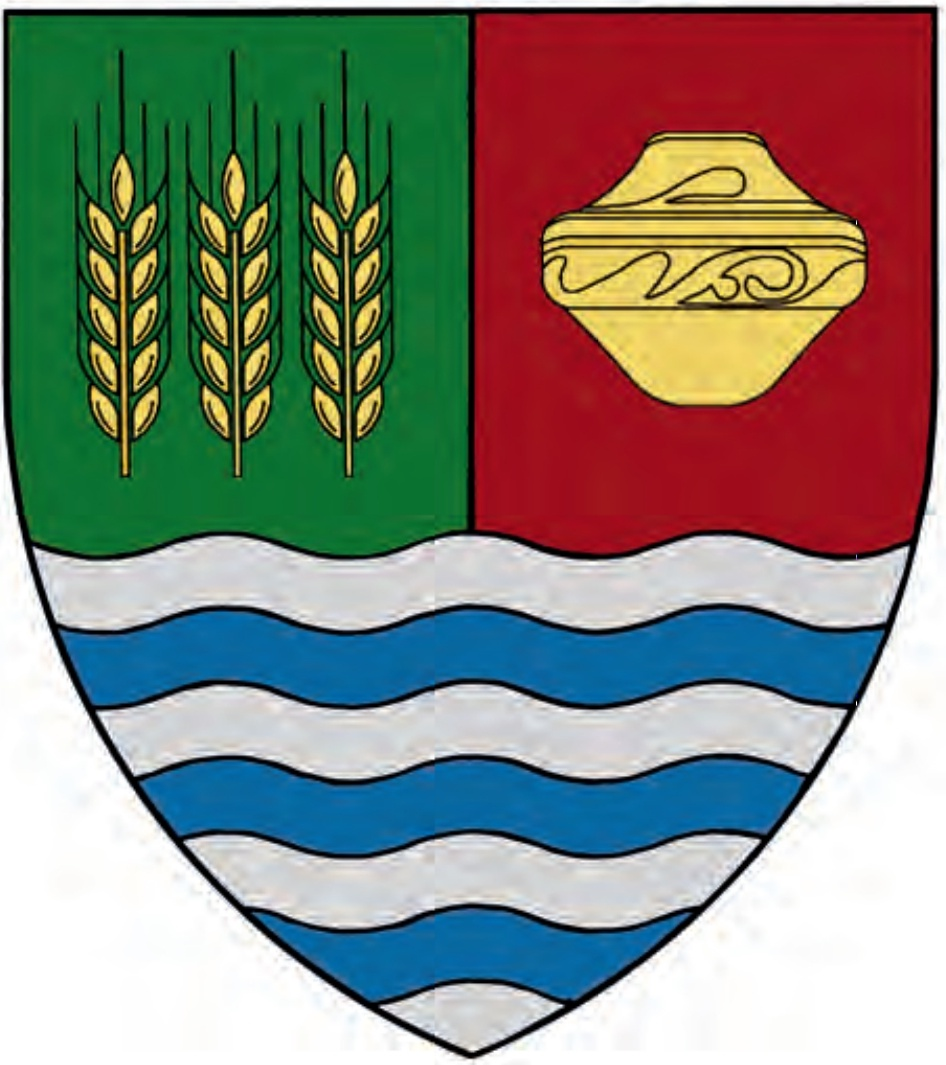
Călărași

Cluj

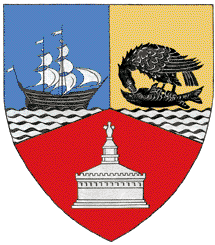
Constanța

Covasna

Dâmbovița

Dolj

Galați

Giurgiu

Harghita

Hunedoara

Ialomița

Iași

Ilfov

Maramureș

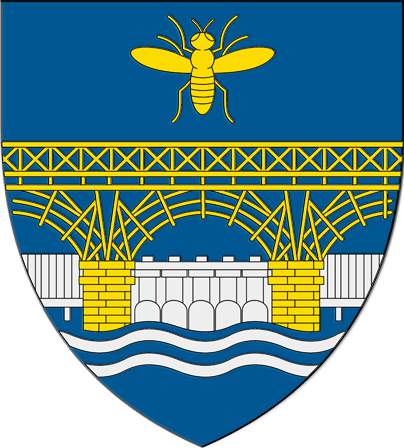
Mehedinți

Mureș

Neamț

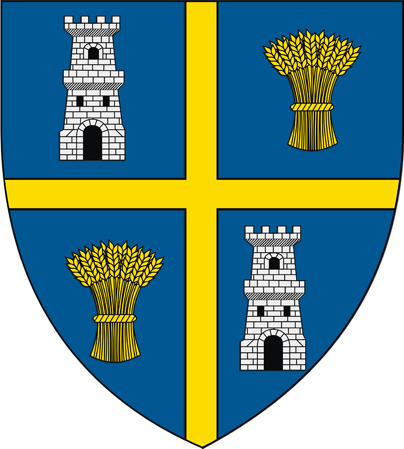
Olt

Prahova

Sălaj

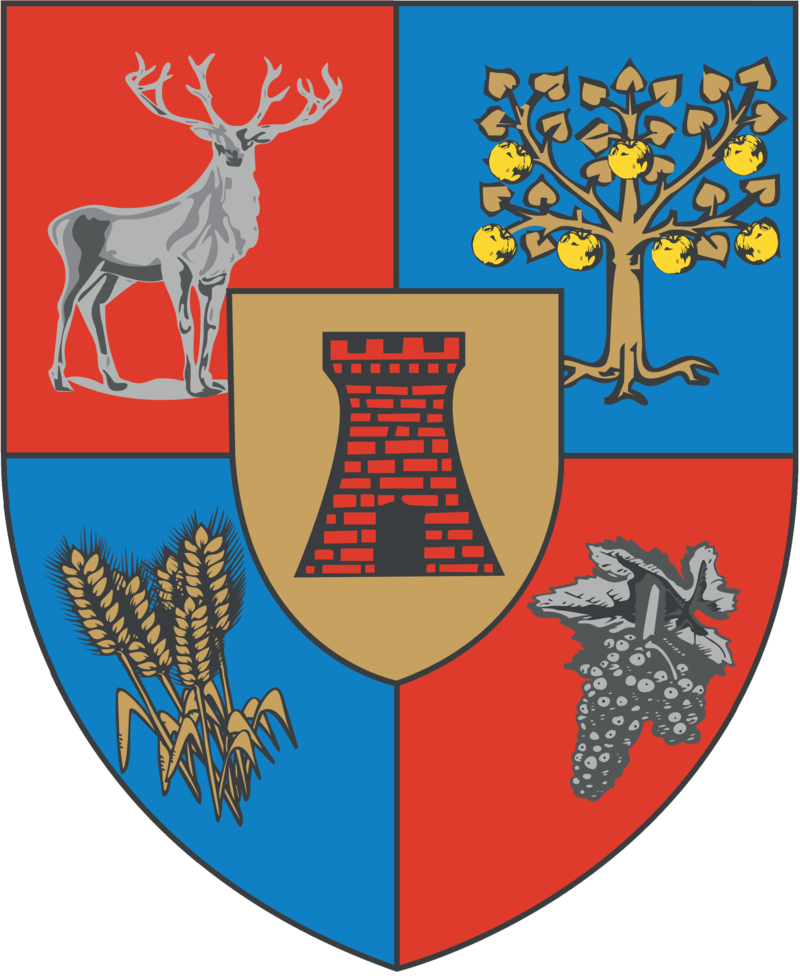
Satu Mare

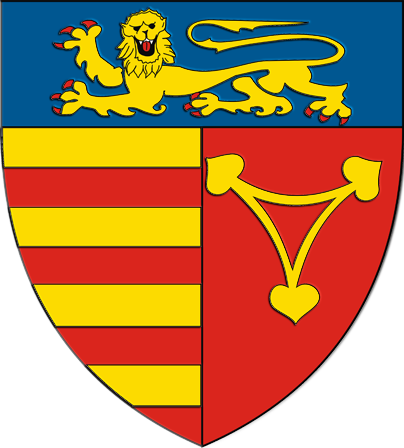
Sibiu

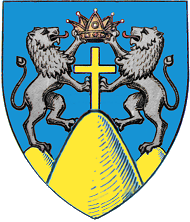
Suceava

Teleorman

Timiș

Tulcea

Vaslui

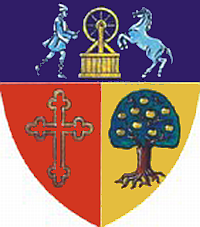
Vâlcea

Vrancea

=== Coats of arms of the county seats ===
The coats of arms of the county seats are distinguished from those of the urban entities by the absence of a mural crown present in the latter. The crown has an odd number of towers (one, three, five or seven), depending on the importance of the urban entity.

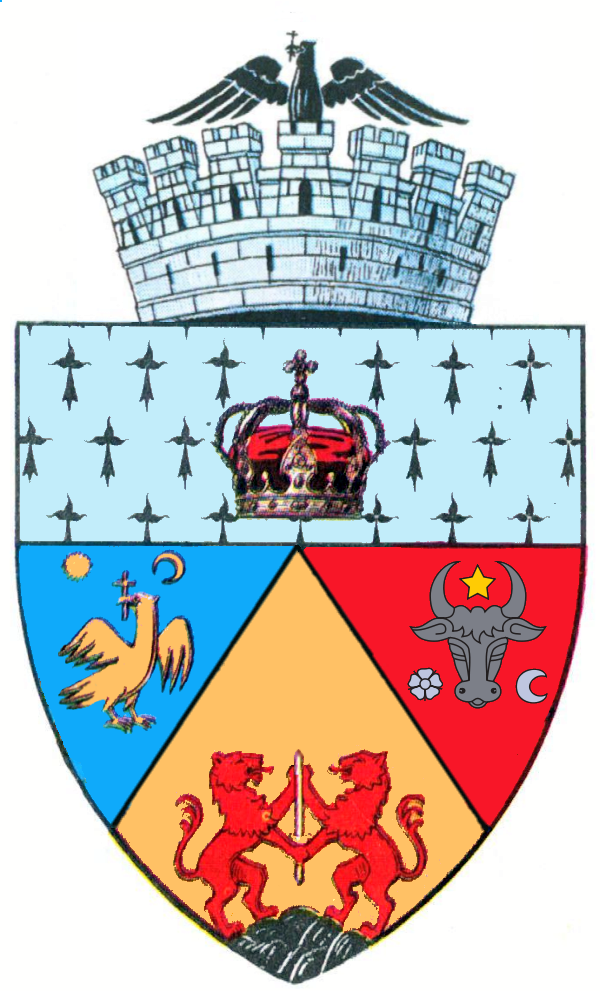
Alba-Iulia

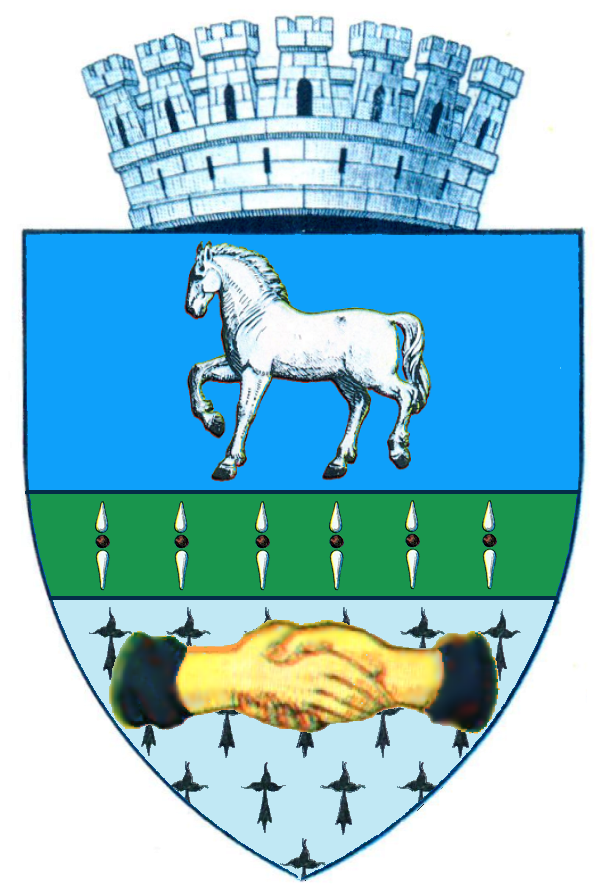
Alexandria

Arad

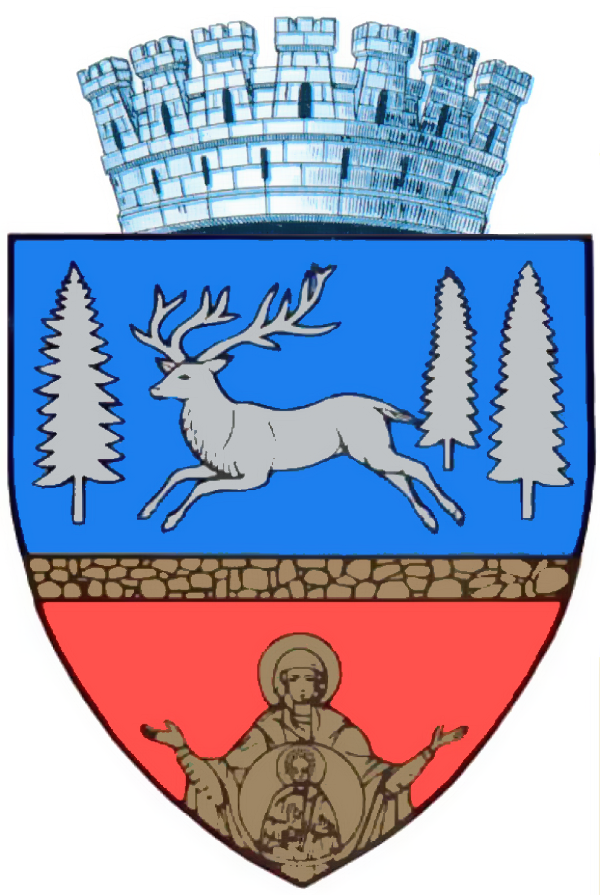
Bacău

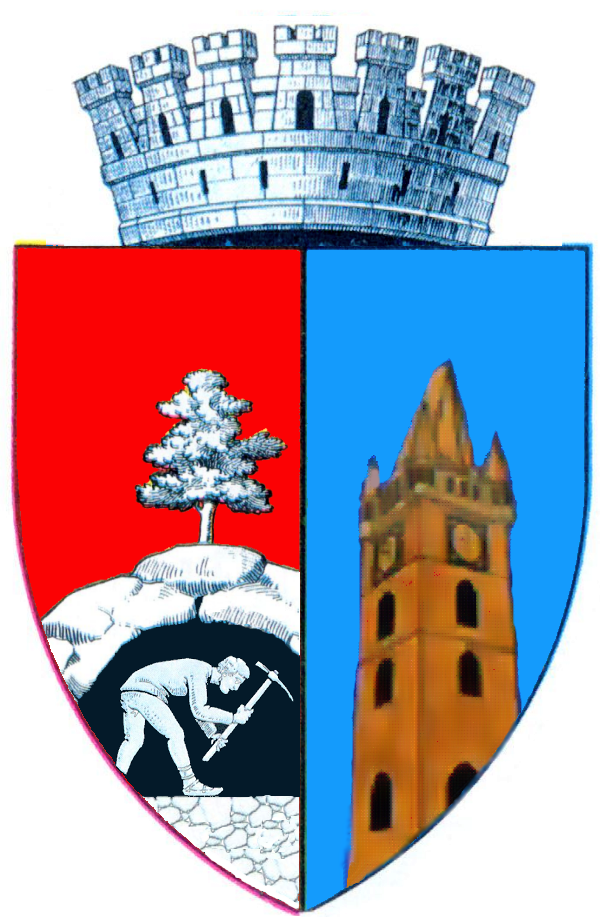
Baia Mare

Botoșani

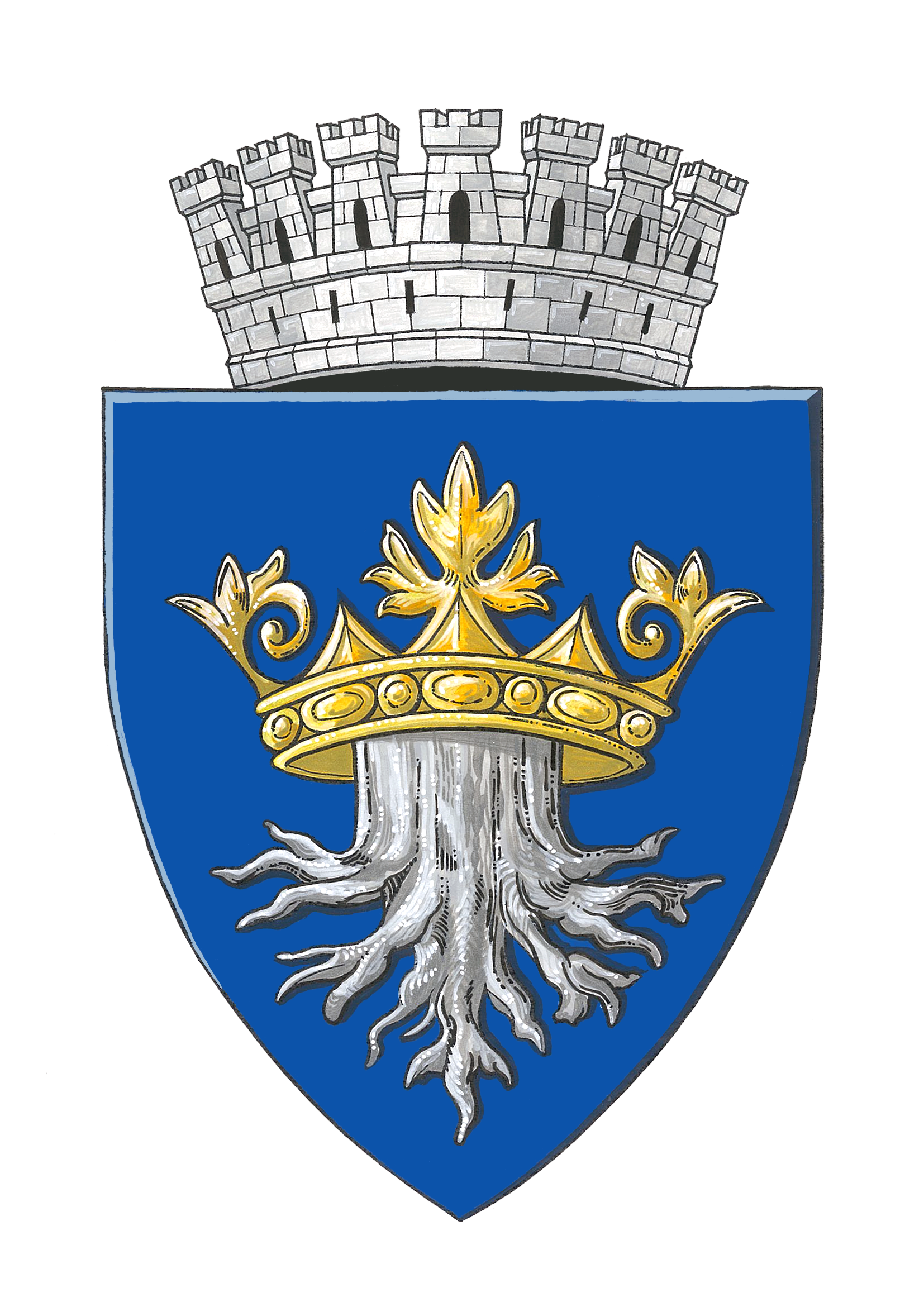
Brașov

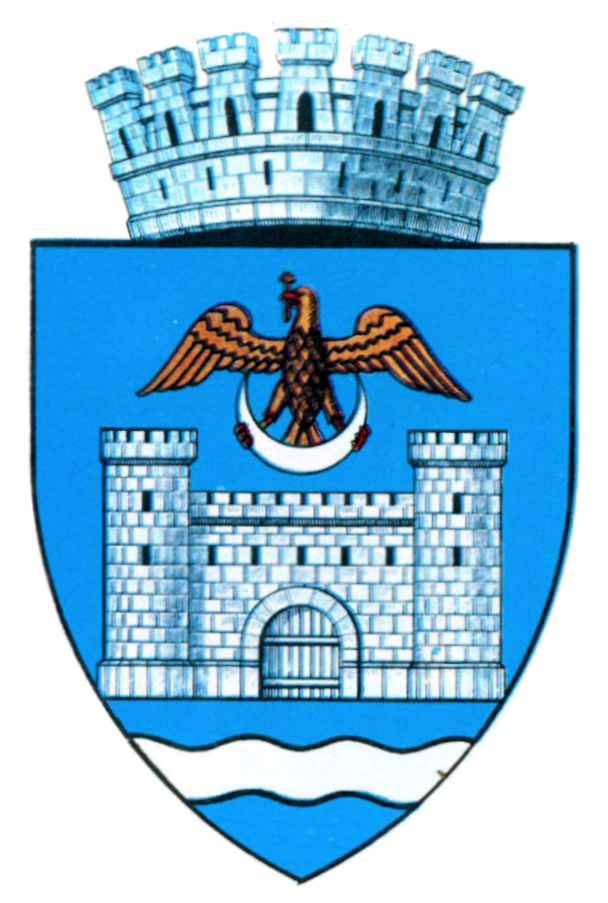
Brăila

Bucharest

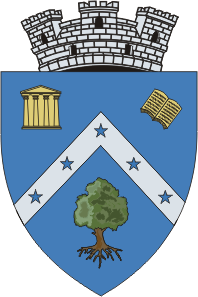
Buftea

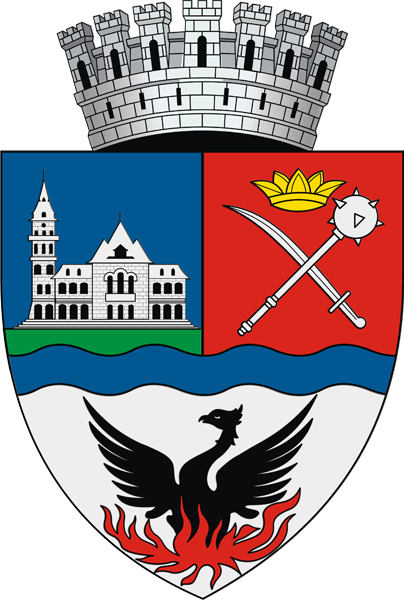
Buzău

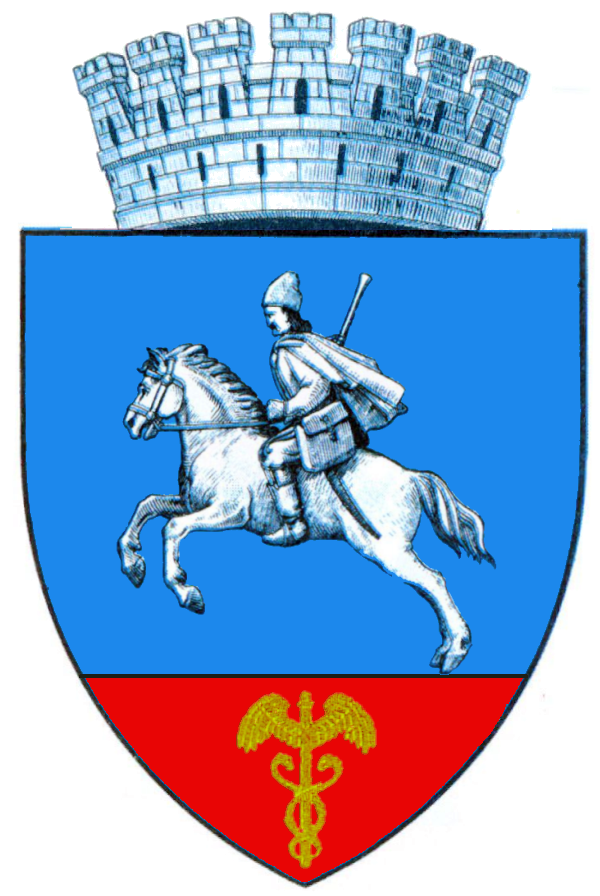
Călărași

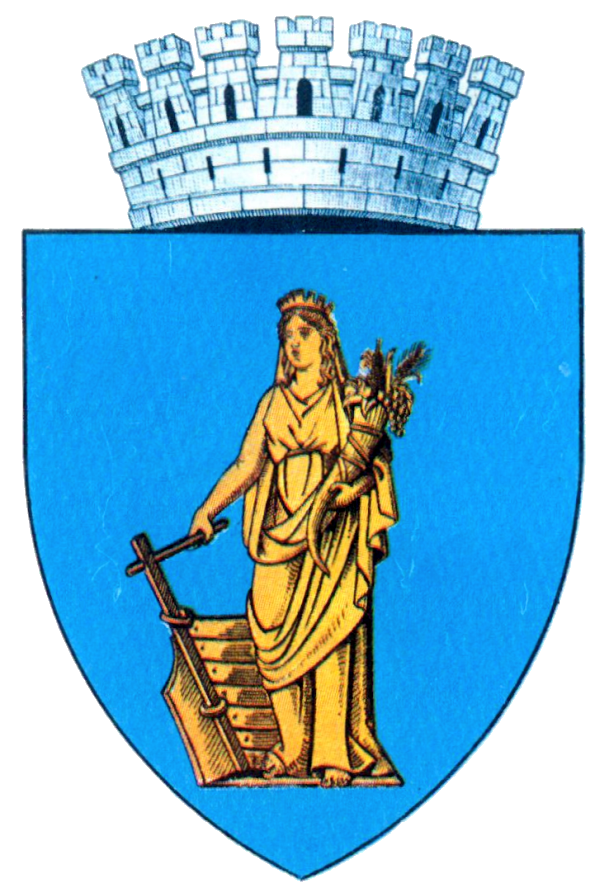
Constanța

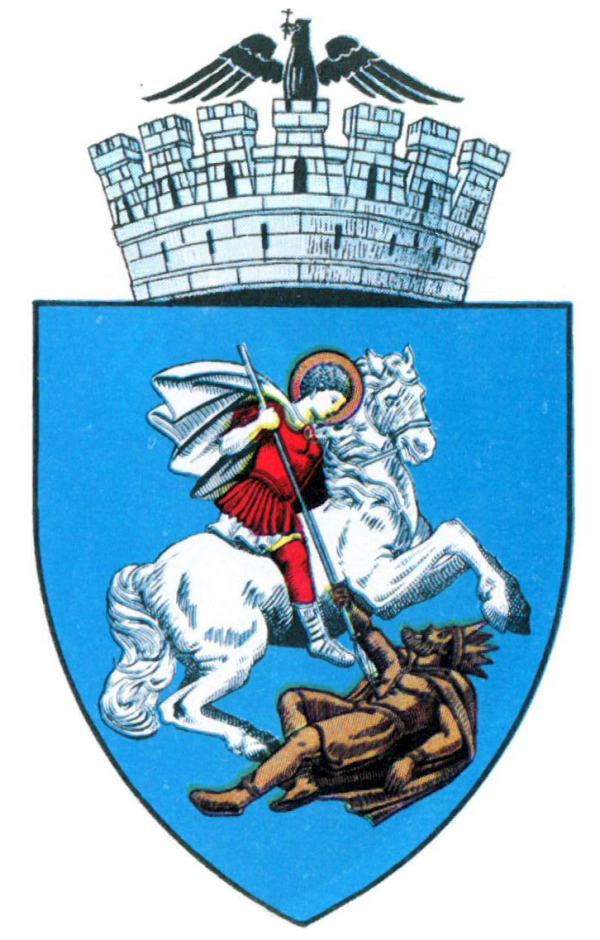
Craiova

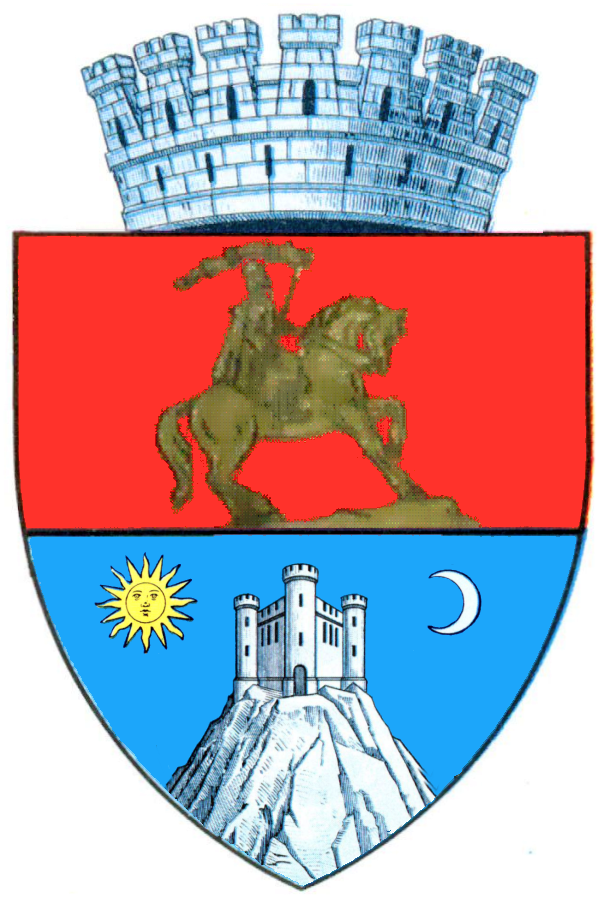
Deva

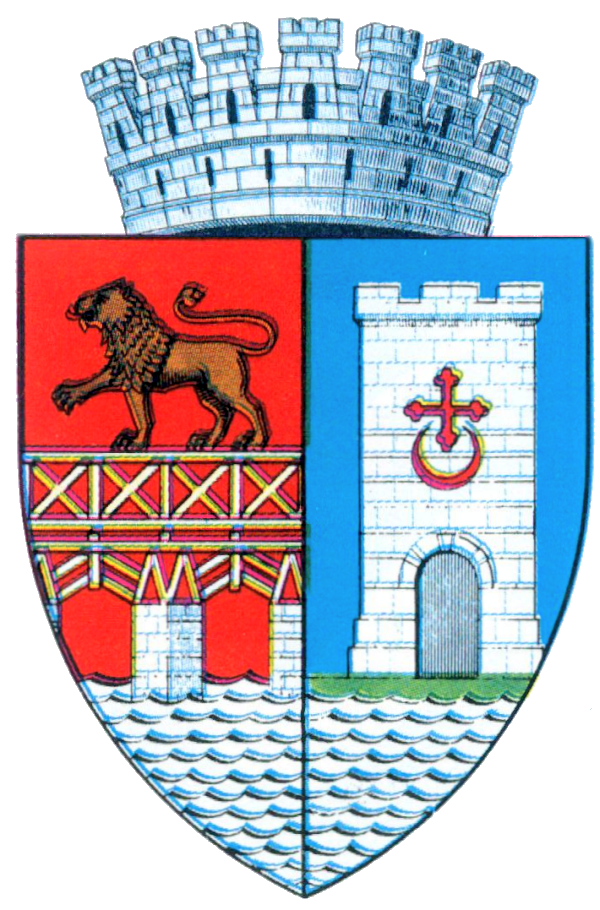
Drobeta-Turnu Severin

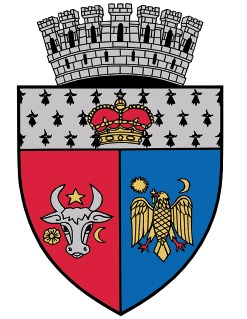
Focșani

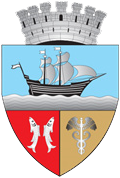
Galați

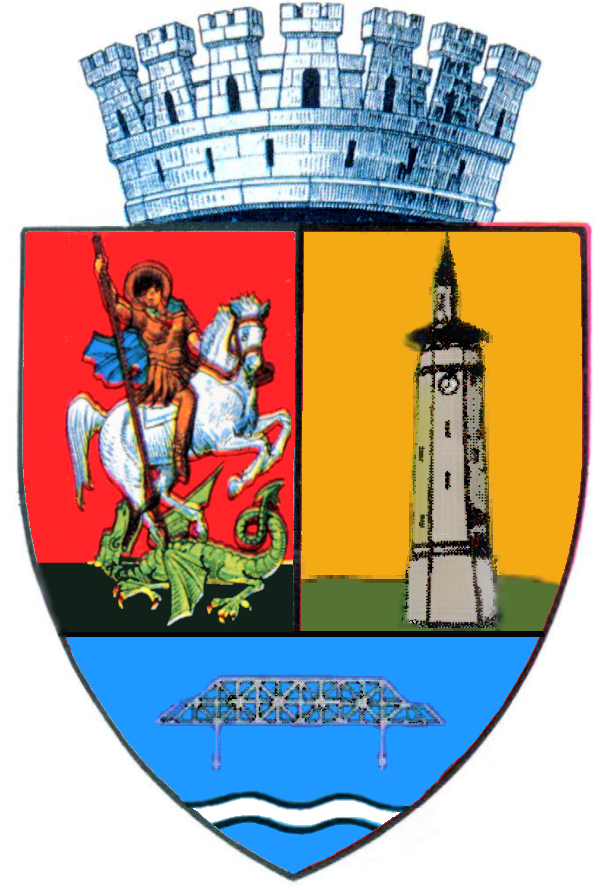
Giurgiu

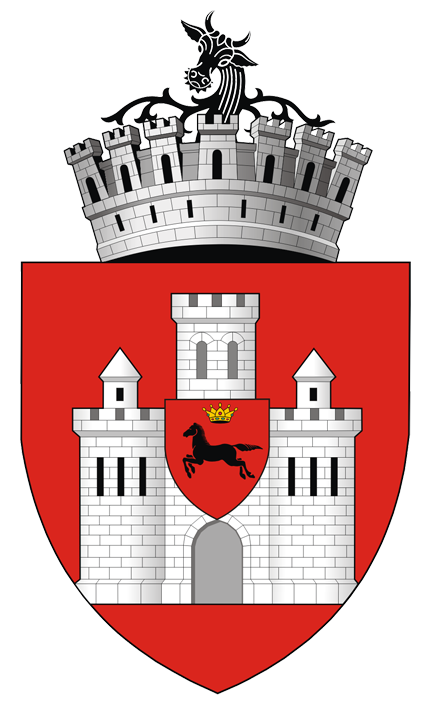
Iași

Miercurea-Ciuc

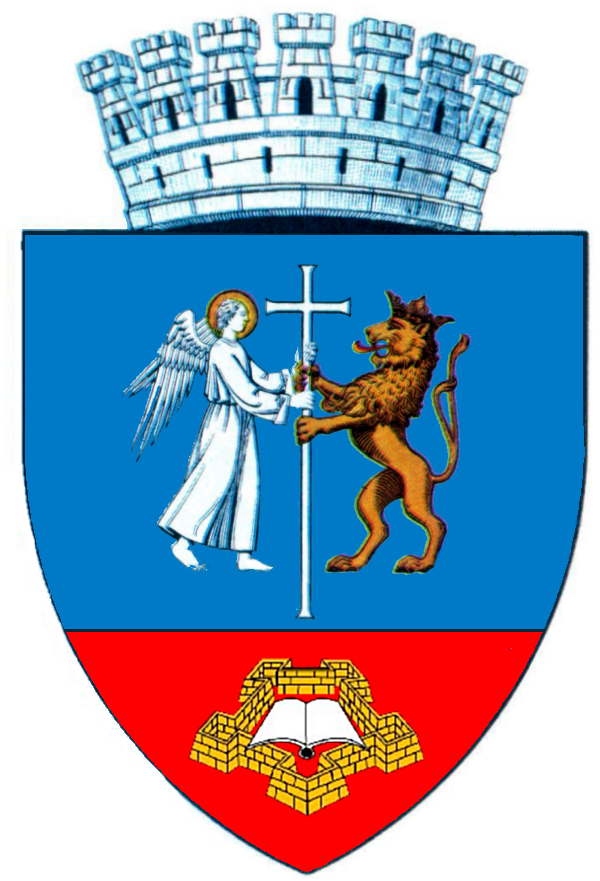
Oradea

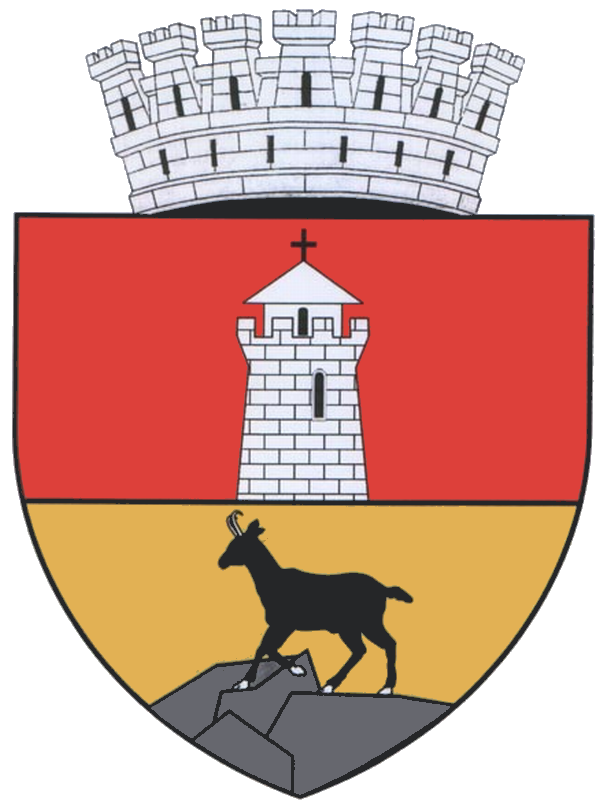
Piatra Neamț

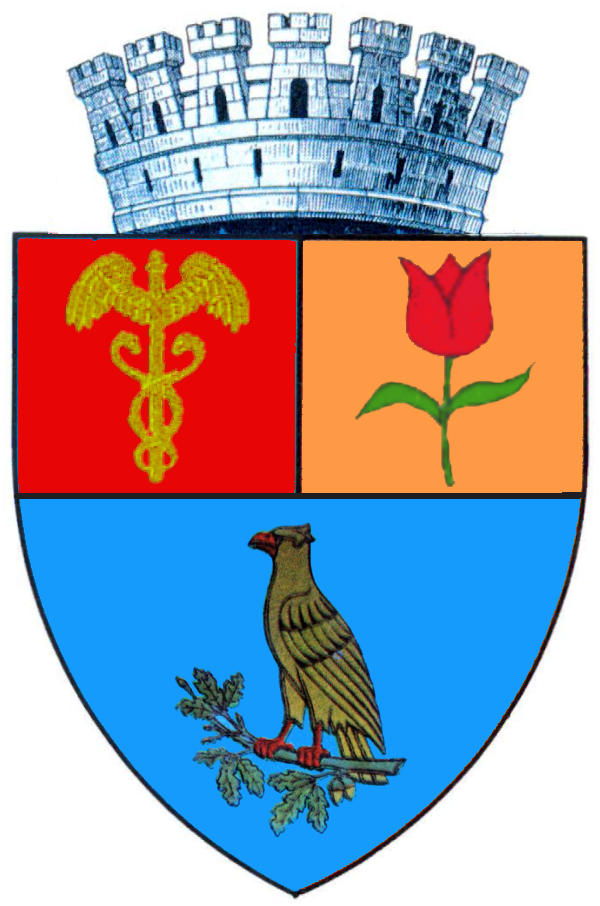
Pitești

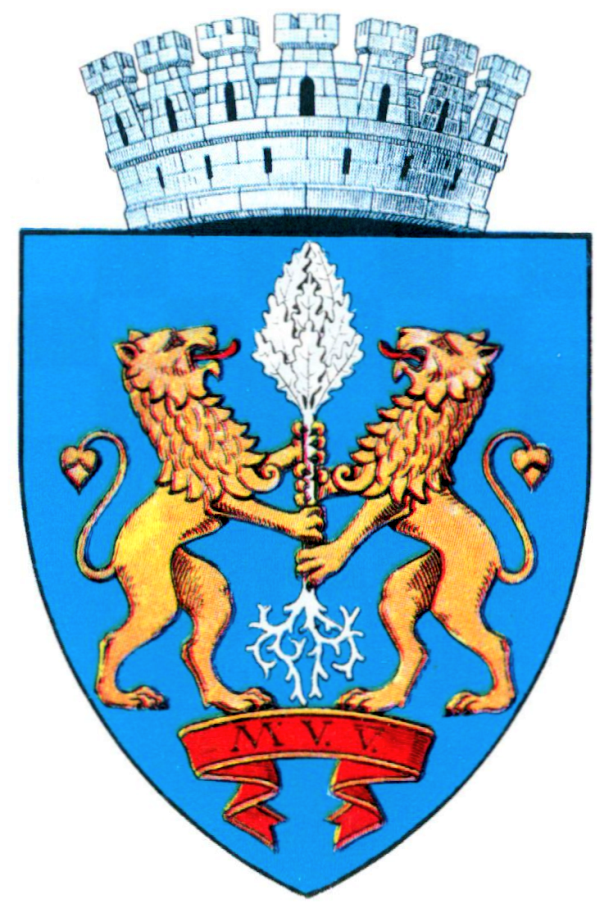
Ploiești

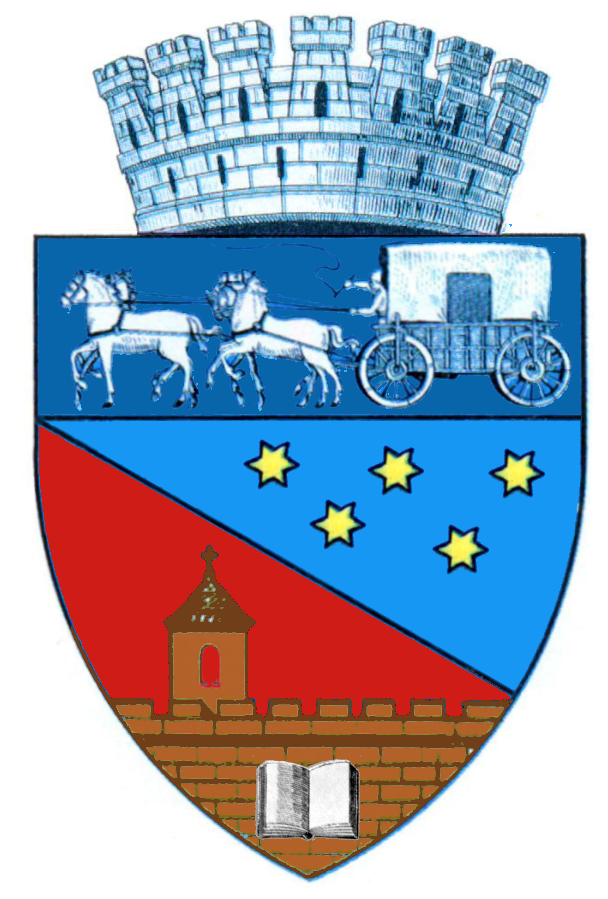
Râmnicu Vâlcea

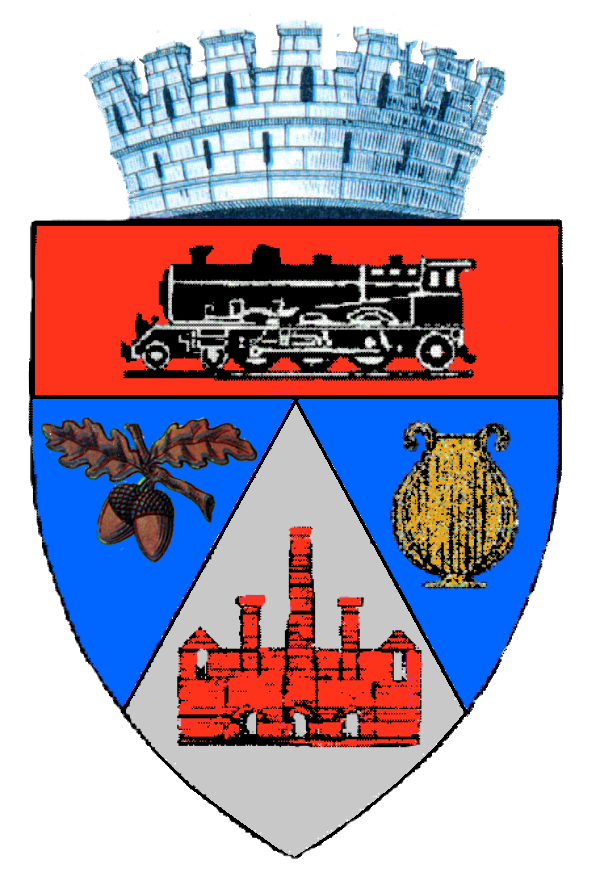
Reșița

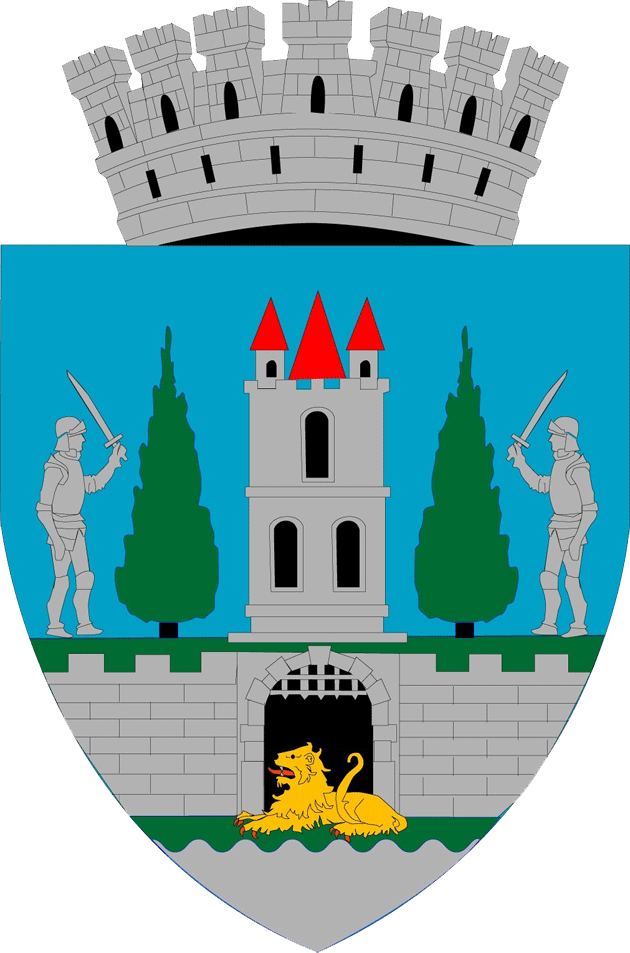
Satu Mare

Sfântu Gheorghe

Sibiu

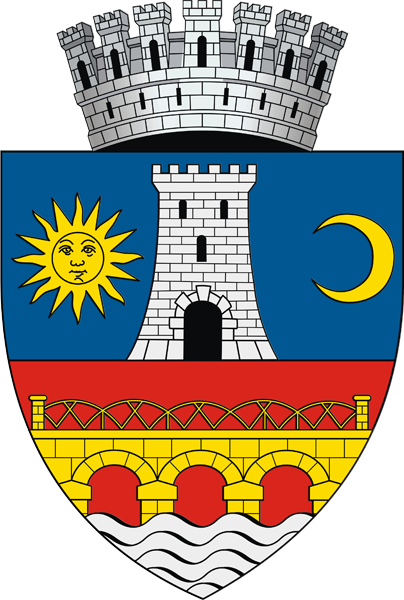
Slatina

Slobozia

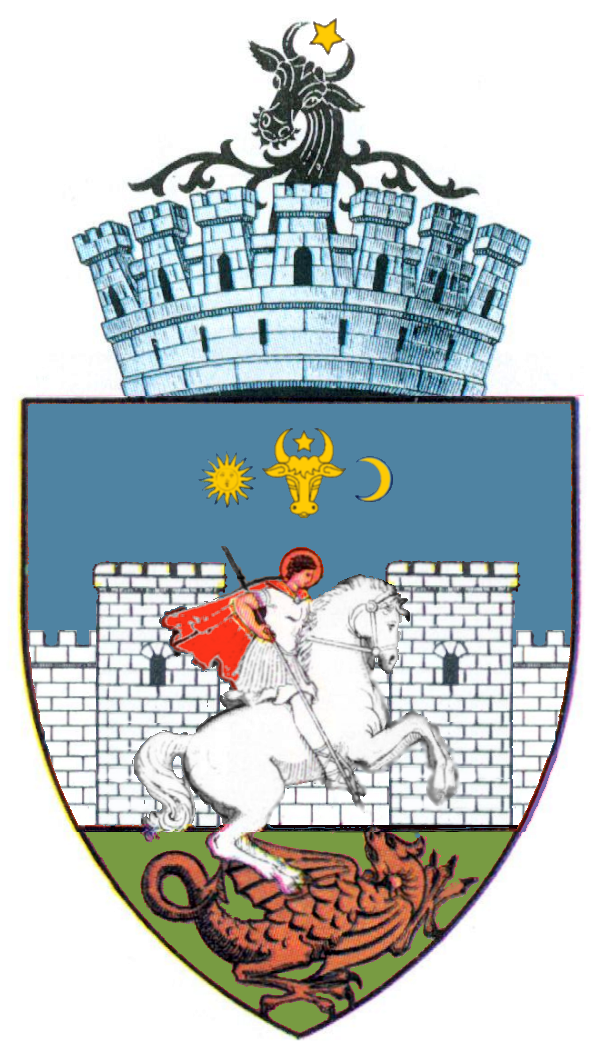
Suceava

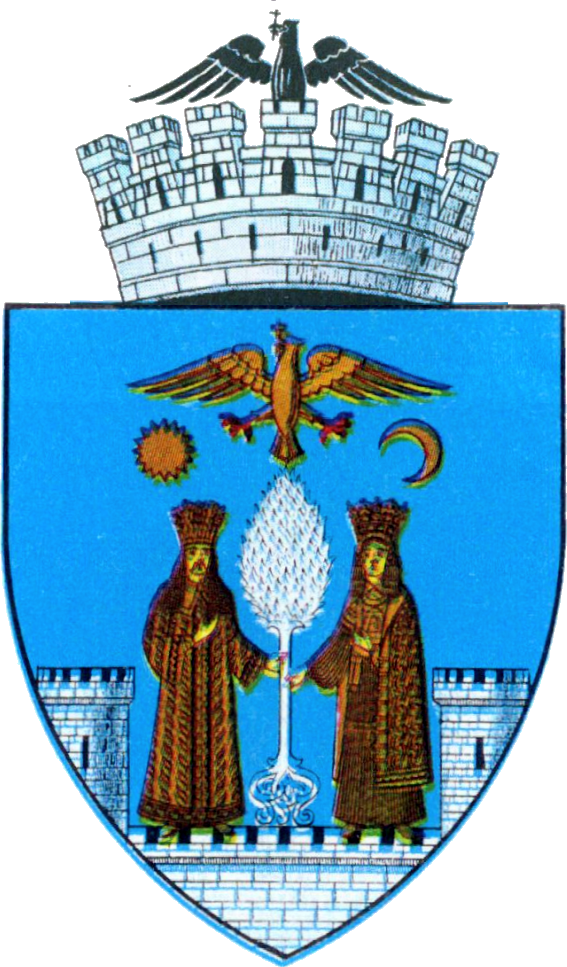
Târgoviște

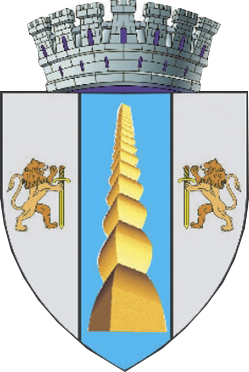
Târgu Jiu

Târgu Mureş

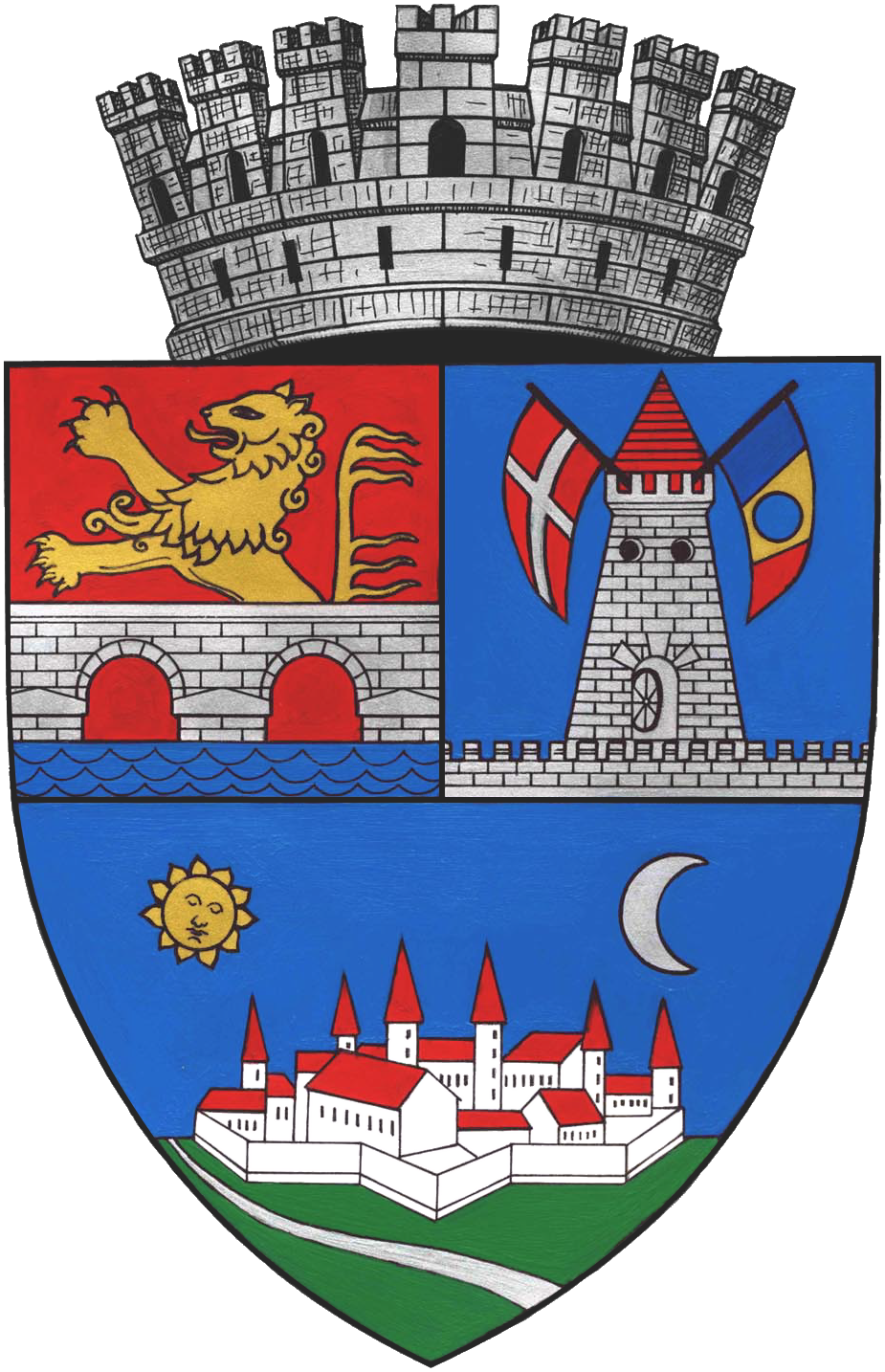
Timișoara

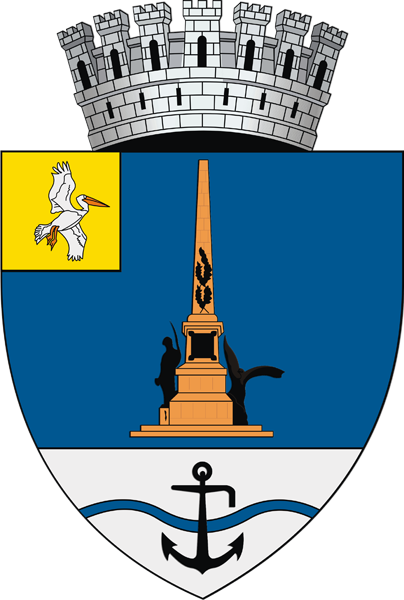
Tulcea

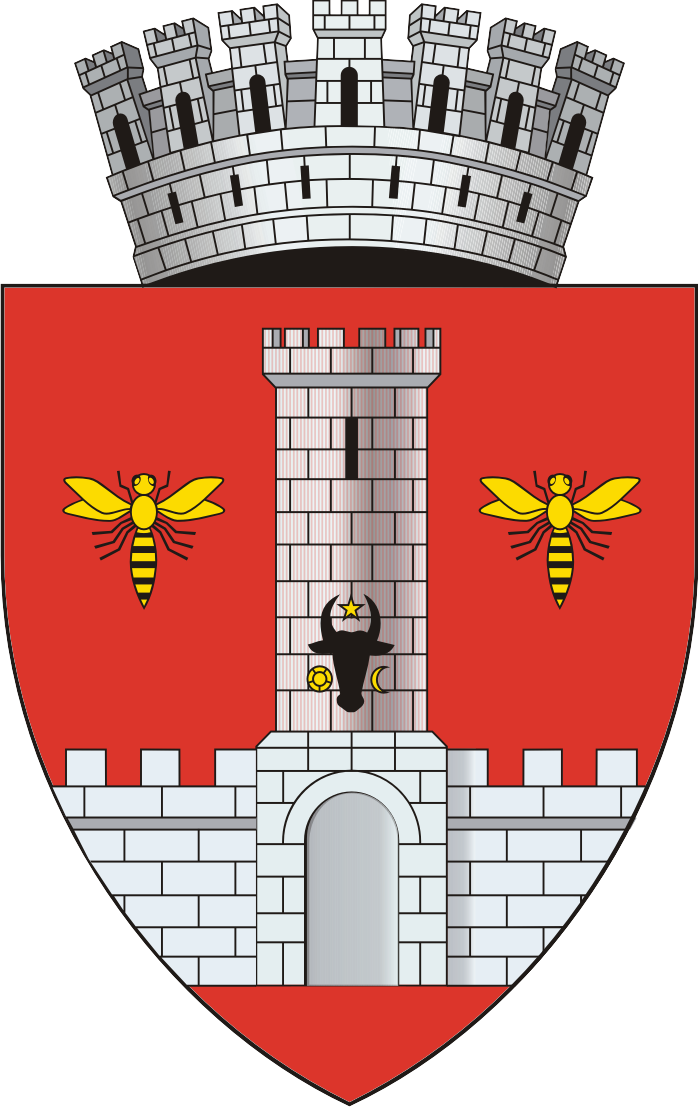
Vaslui

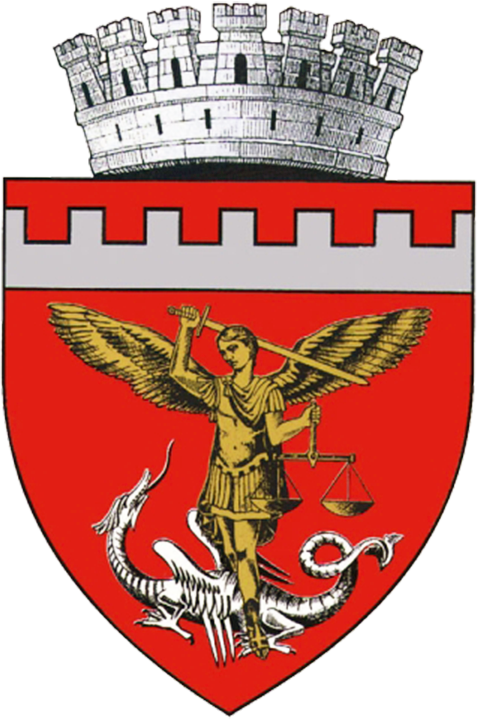
Zalău

== Coats of arms of central institutions ==
=== Parliament ===
The Parliament of Romania does not hold a coat of arms, as it does not function as a whole entity. When a law is published in the Official Gazette of Romania, it is headed by the coat of arms of Romania. The two houses of the Parliament of Romania issue documents that are not laws. These documents bear the coat of arms of the issuing house. The coat of arms of the Senate of Romania is the Coat of arms of Romania surrounded by two olive branches which are tied together with a cloth in the colors of the Flag of Romania. On the yellow section it reads Senat, and on top of the coat of arms it reads Romania. The coat of arms of the Chamber of Deputies of Romania reproduces the eagle of the Coat of arms of Romania surrounded by two olive branches tied together with a golden cloth. Beneath the eagle it reads Camera Deputatilor, and beneath the olive branches it reads Romania.

Chamber of Deputies of Romania

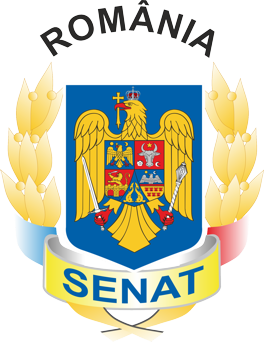
Senate of Romania

=== Ministries ===
Ministry of Foreign Affairs

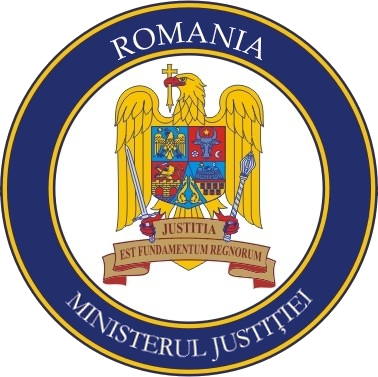
Ministry of Justice

Ministry of National Defense

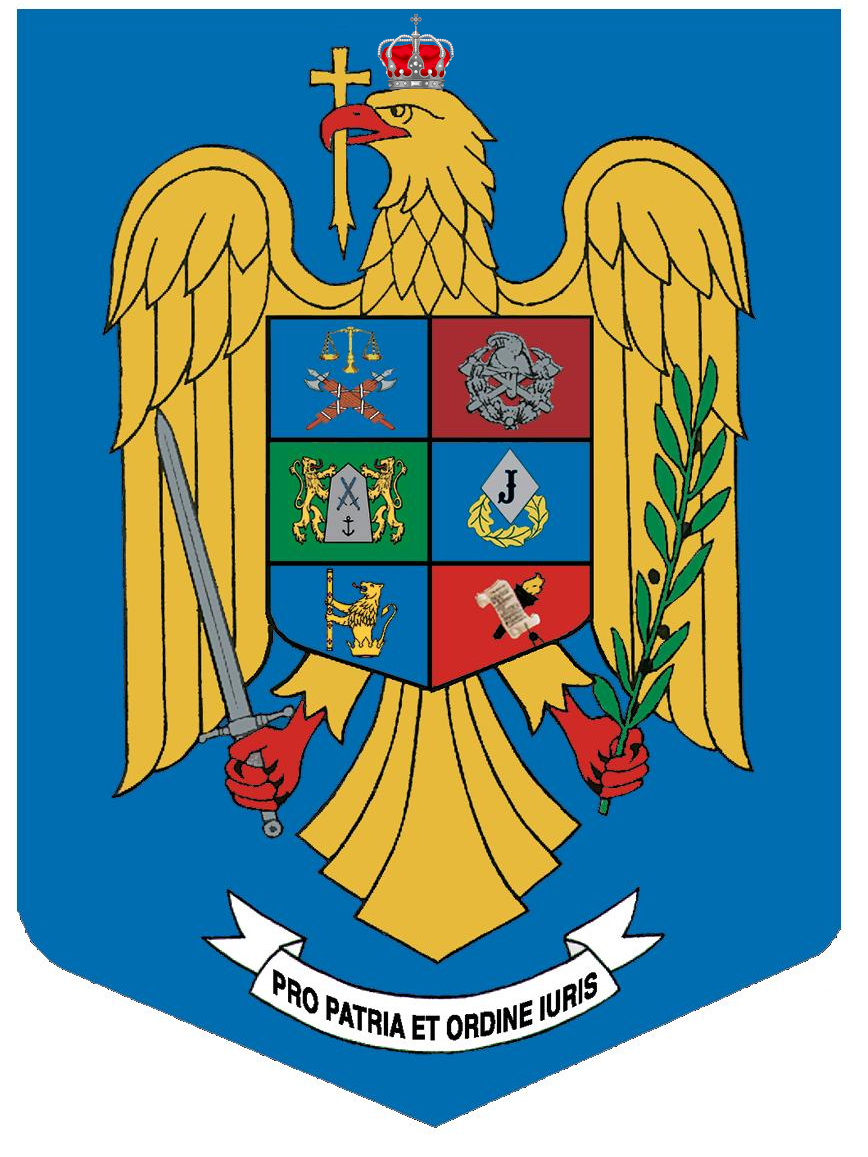
Coat of arms of the Ministry of Internal Affairs

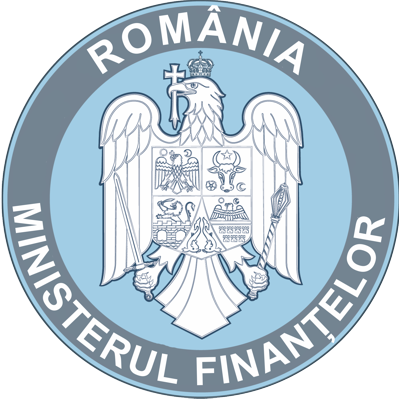
Ministry of Public Finance

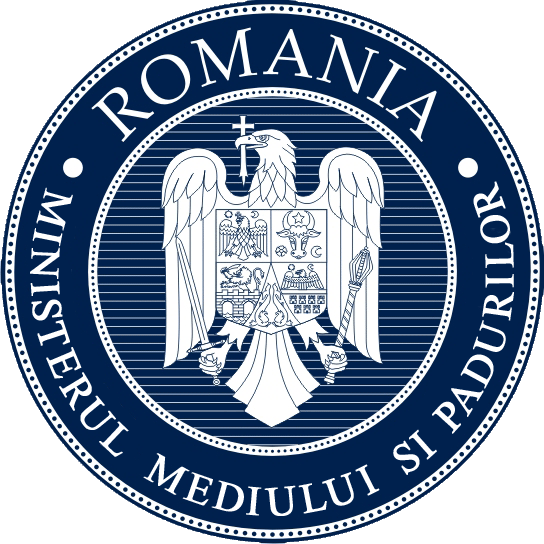
Ministry of Environment and Forests

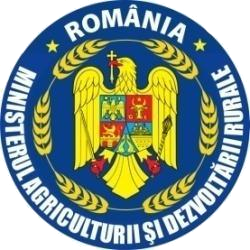
Ministry of Agriculture and Rural Development

==== Former coats of arms ====
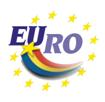
Former Ministry of European Integration of Romania

The coat of arms of the Ministry of Justice used until 2007

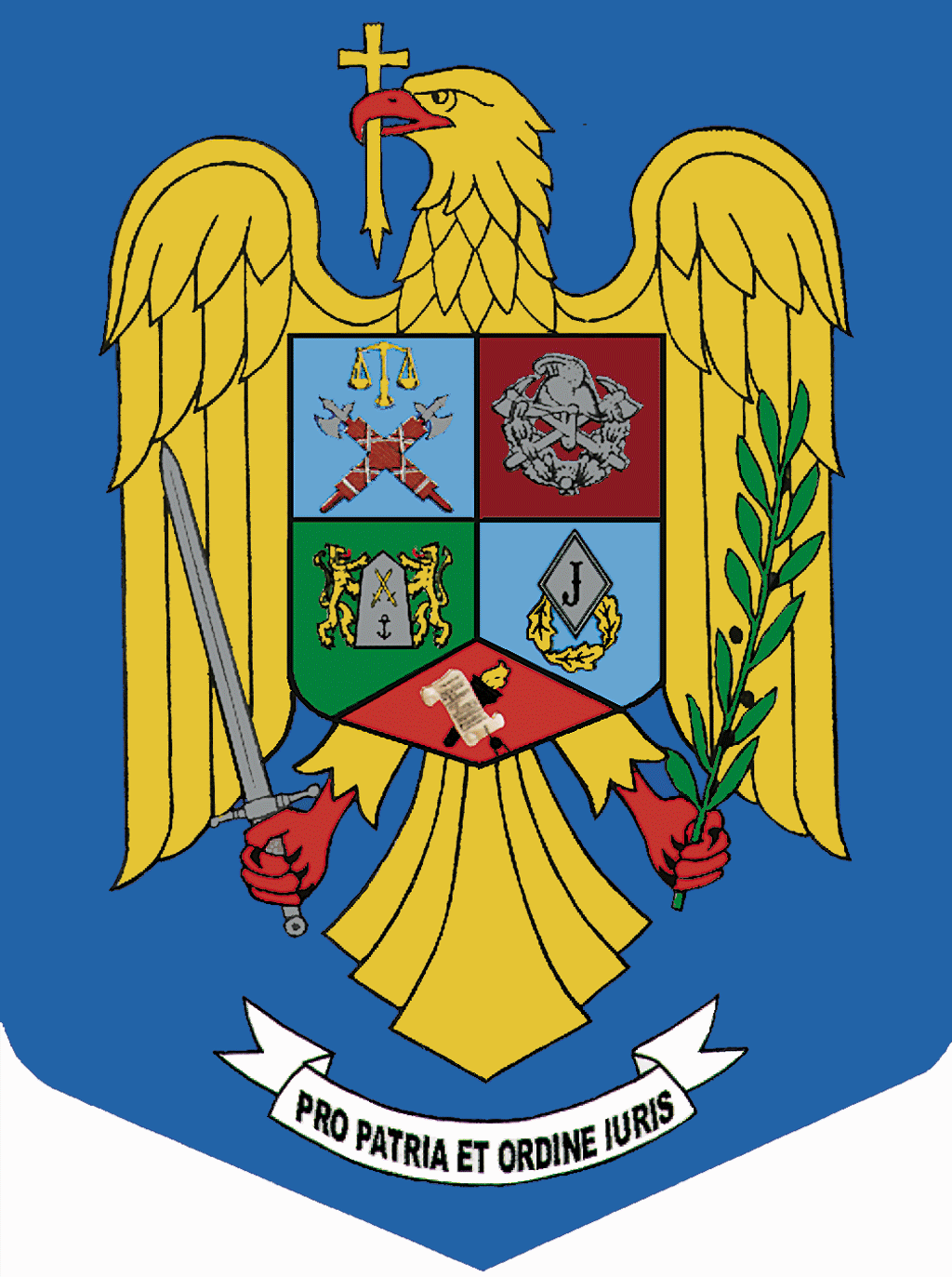
The coat of arms of The Ministry of Administration and Interior used until about 2008

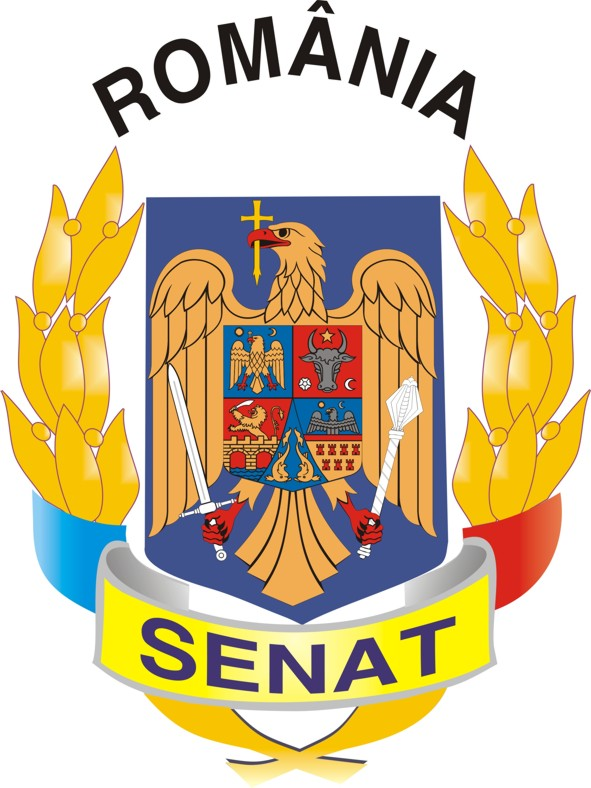
Senate of Romania (1992 (?) – 2016)

Chamber of Deputies of Romania (1992 (?) – 2016)

=== Heraldry of the Ministry of Internal Affairs ===
In 2008, the Ministry of Internal Affairs (then called the Ministry of Administration and Interior) decided to allow the units of the Inspectorates in its structure to use coats of arms. This decision applied to the County Inspectorates of Police, County Inspectorates of the Gendarmerie, County Inspectorates of the Border Police, County Inspectorates of the General Inspectorate for Emergency Situations, Units and educational institutions of the Gendarmerie, Schools of the Police, central units and institutions of the Ministry of Administration and Interior. Gradual introduction of these coats of arms began in 2010. Prior to this decision, the Inspectorates in the Ministry were permitted to use their own coats of arms at the national and local levels. The coats of arms of all the institutions of the Ministry of Internal Affairs are administered by the Ministry's Heraldic Commission, and not by the committee of National Heraldry, Sealography, and Genealogy.

Romanian Police

Inspectorate for Emergency Situations

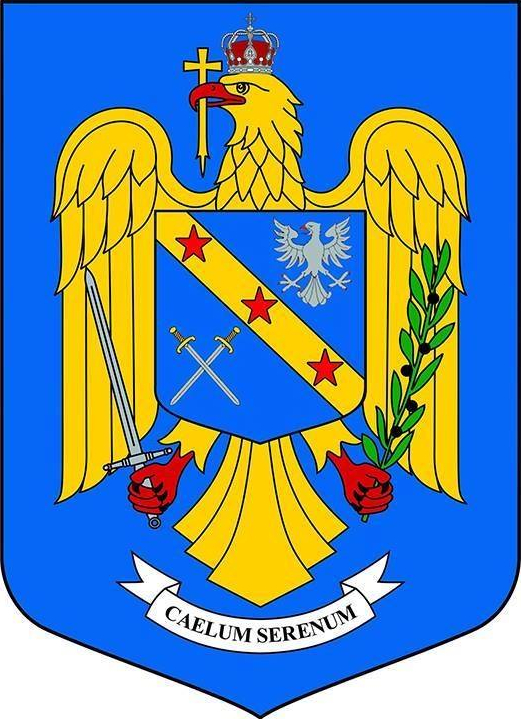
General Inspectorate of Aviation

Border Police

Romanian Gendarmerie

Romanian National Archives

==== Gendarmerie heraldry ====
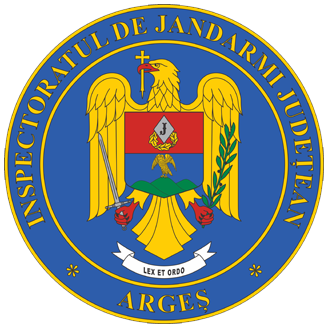
Argeș County Gendarmerie Inspectorate

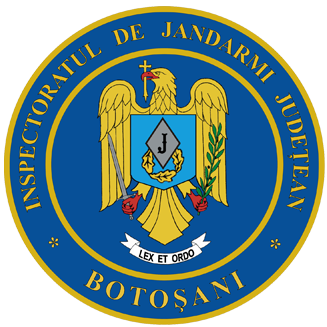
Botoșani County Gendarmerie Inspectorate

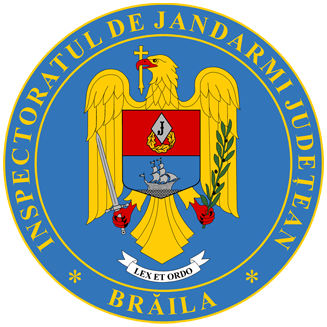
Brăila County Gendarmerie Inspectorate

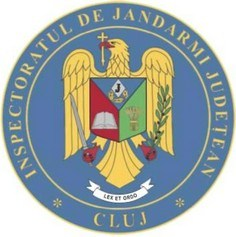
Cluj County Gendarmerie Inspectorate

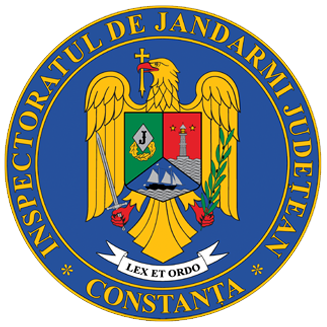
Constanța County Gendarmerie Inspectorate

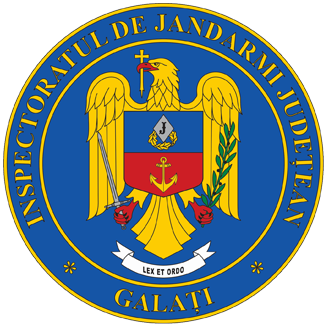
Galați County Gendarmerie Inspectorate

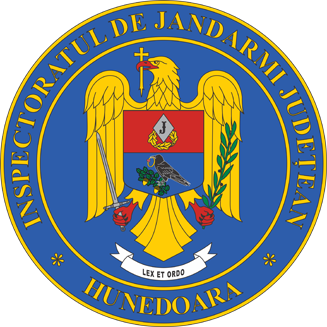
Hunedoara County Gendarmerie Inspectorate

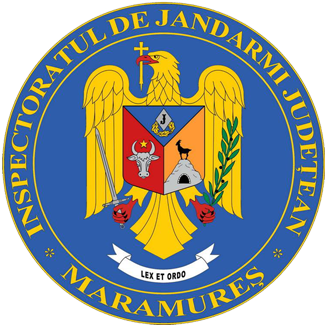
Maramureș County Gendarmerie Inspectorate

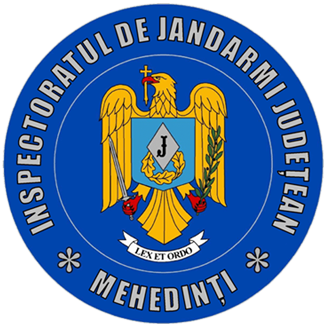
Mehedinți County Gendarmerie Inspectorate

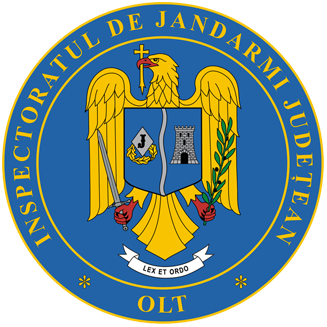
Olt County Gendarmerie Inspectorate

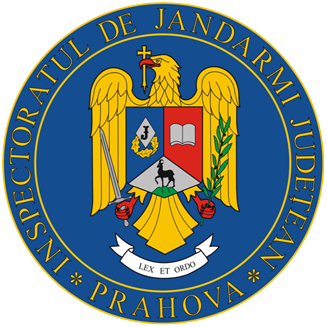
Prahova County Gendarmerie Inspectorate

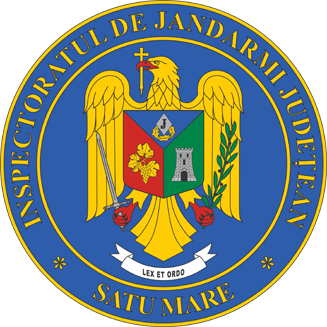
Satu Mare County Gendarmerie Inspectorate

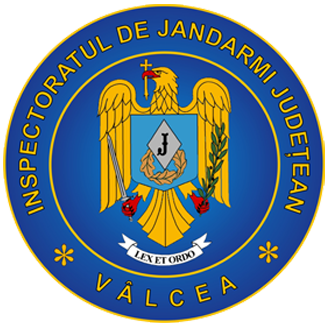
Vâlcea County Gendarmerie Inspectorate

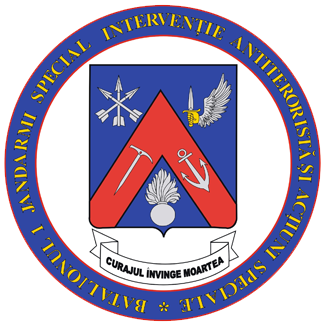
Special Gendarmes Battalion 1 Antiterrorism Intervention and Special Actions

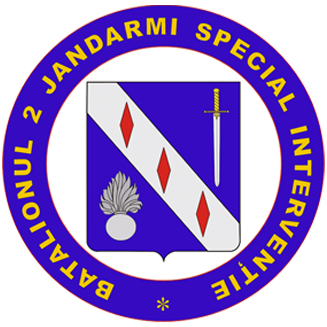
Special Gendarmes Battalion no. 2 Intervention

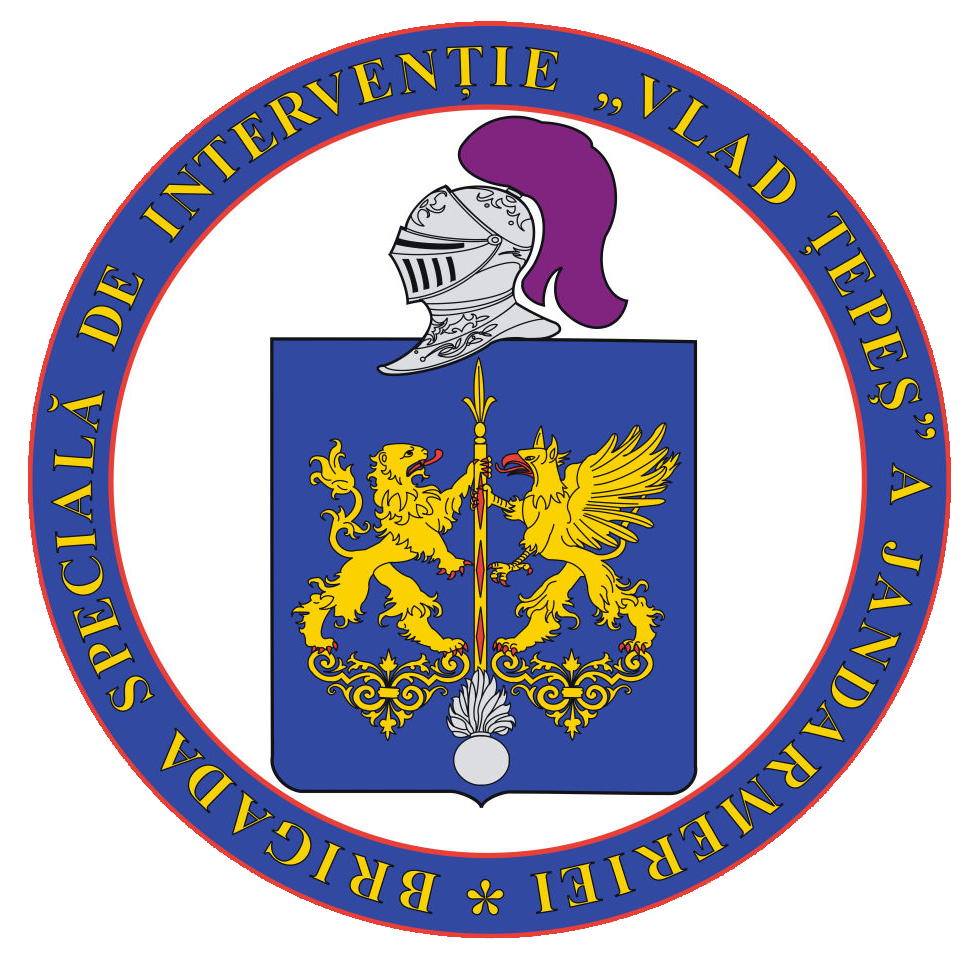
Special Brigade for Interventions Gendarmes

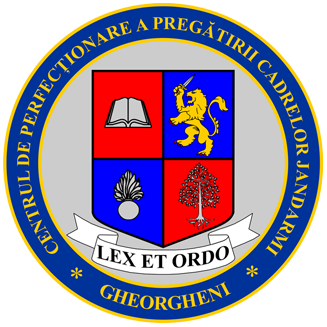
Centre for Gendarmes Employees Training Gheorgheni

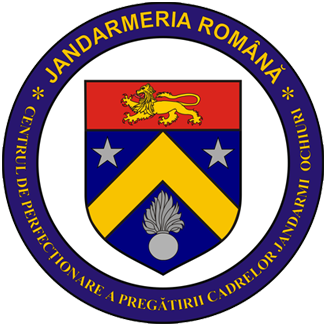
Centre for Gendarmes Employees Training Ochiuri

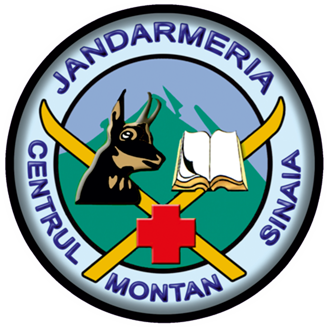
Sinaia Mountain Centre

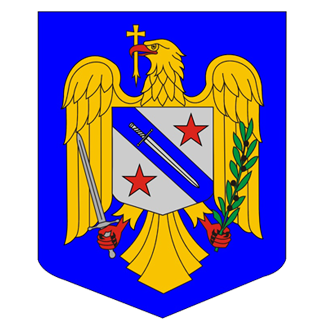
Bucharest General Directorate for Gendarmes

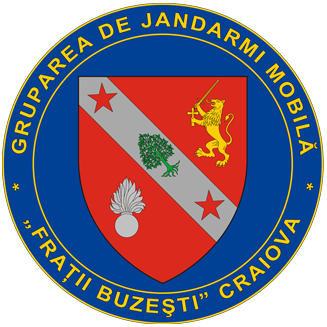
Gendarmerie Mobile Group "Frații Buzești" Craiova

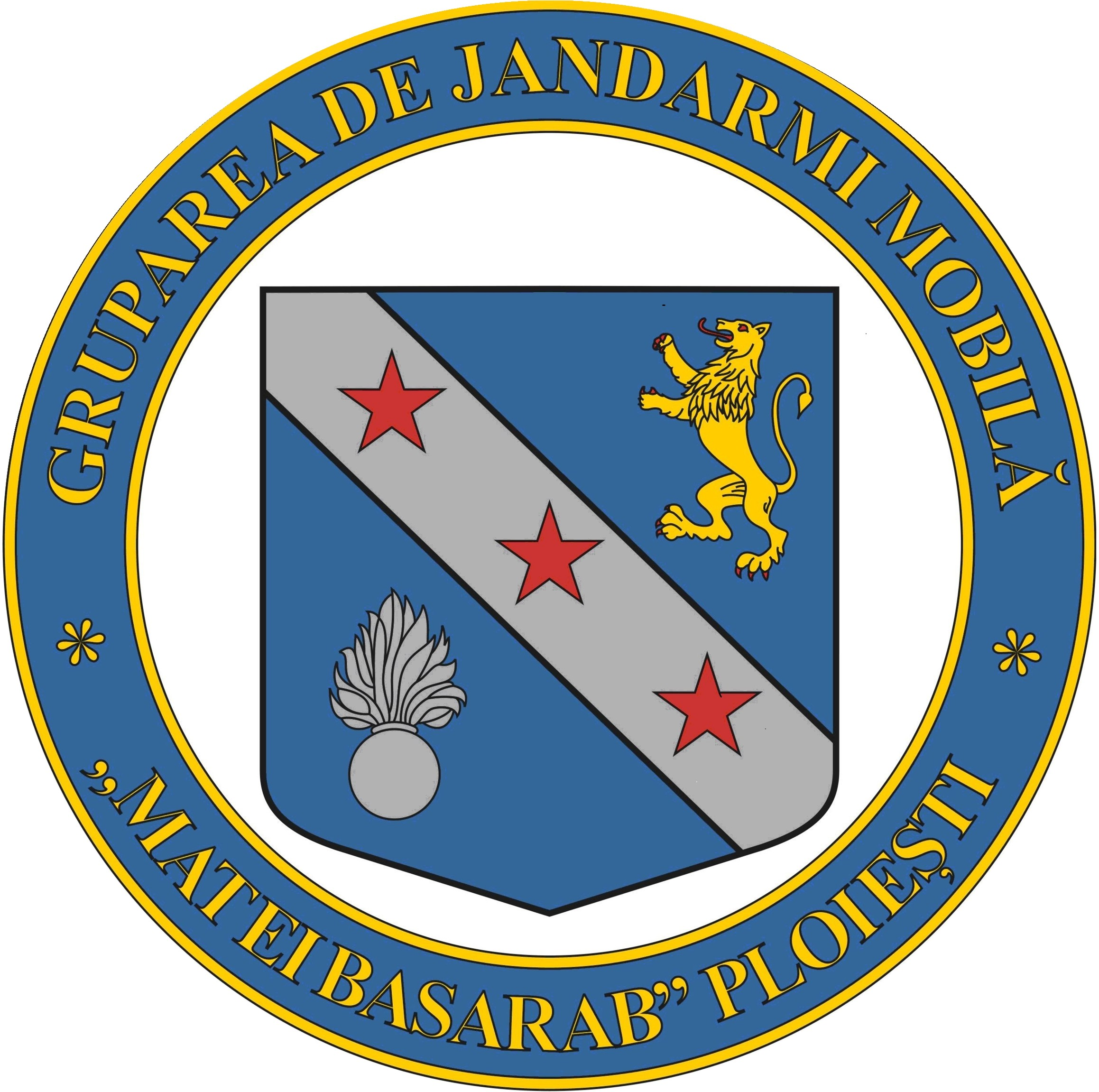
Gendarmerie Mobile Group "Matei Basarab" Ploiești

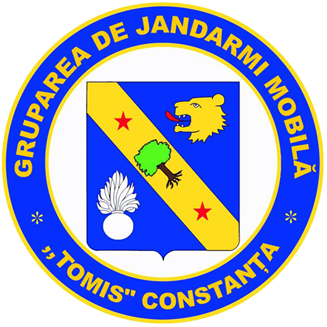
Gendarmerie Mobile Group "Tomis" Constanța

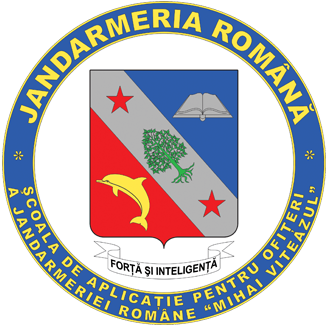
"Mihai Viteazul" School for Application for Gendarmerie Officers

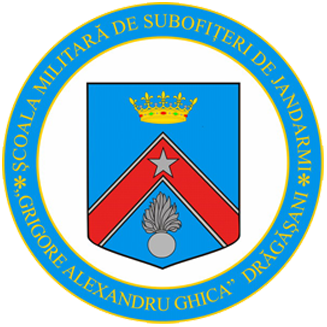
"Grigore Alexandru Ghica" Military School for Gendarmerie Under-Officers Drăgășani

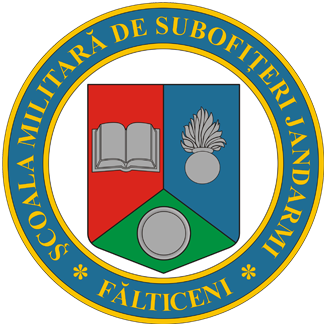
Military School for Gendarmerie Under-Officers Fălticeni

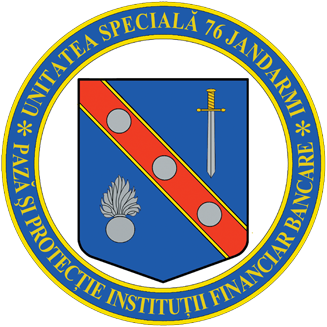
Special Unit 76 Gendarmes Guard and Protection for Financial Institutions and Banks

=== Heraldry of the Romanian Armed Forces ===
Since the 19th century, the symbol of the Romanian Army has been a golden crossed aquila, with red claws and beak, standing on Jupiter's thunderbolt. All the military coats of arms are created starting with this main element. Different ranks of units in the military hierarchy are distinguished by the shape of the shield. The coats of arms of all the institutions of the Ministry of Defense are designed by the Ministry's Heraldric Commission.

The main heraldic element of the Romanian Army

Ministry of National Defense

General Staff of the Romanian Army

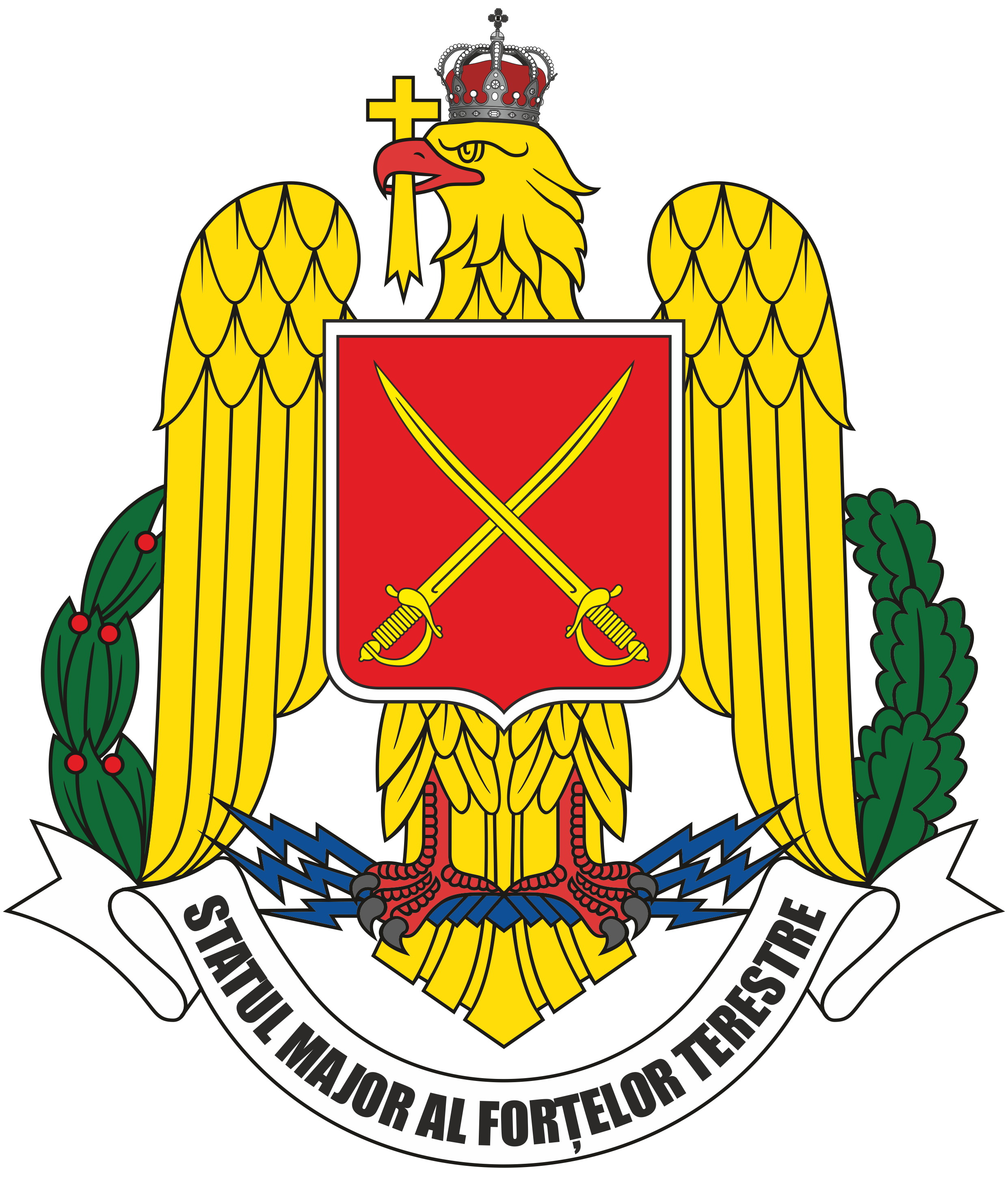
Romanian Land Forces Staff

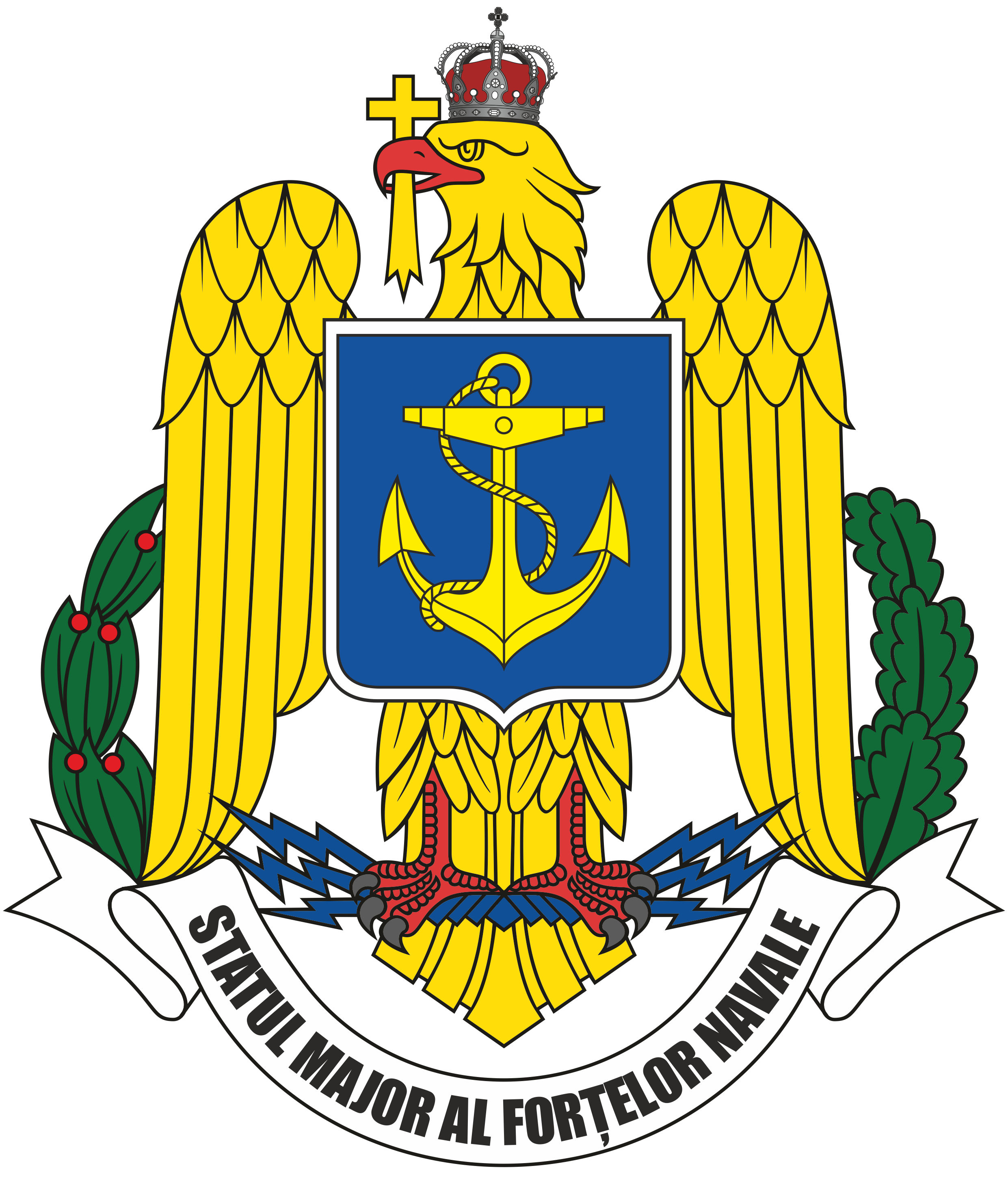
Romanian Naval Forces Staff

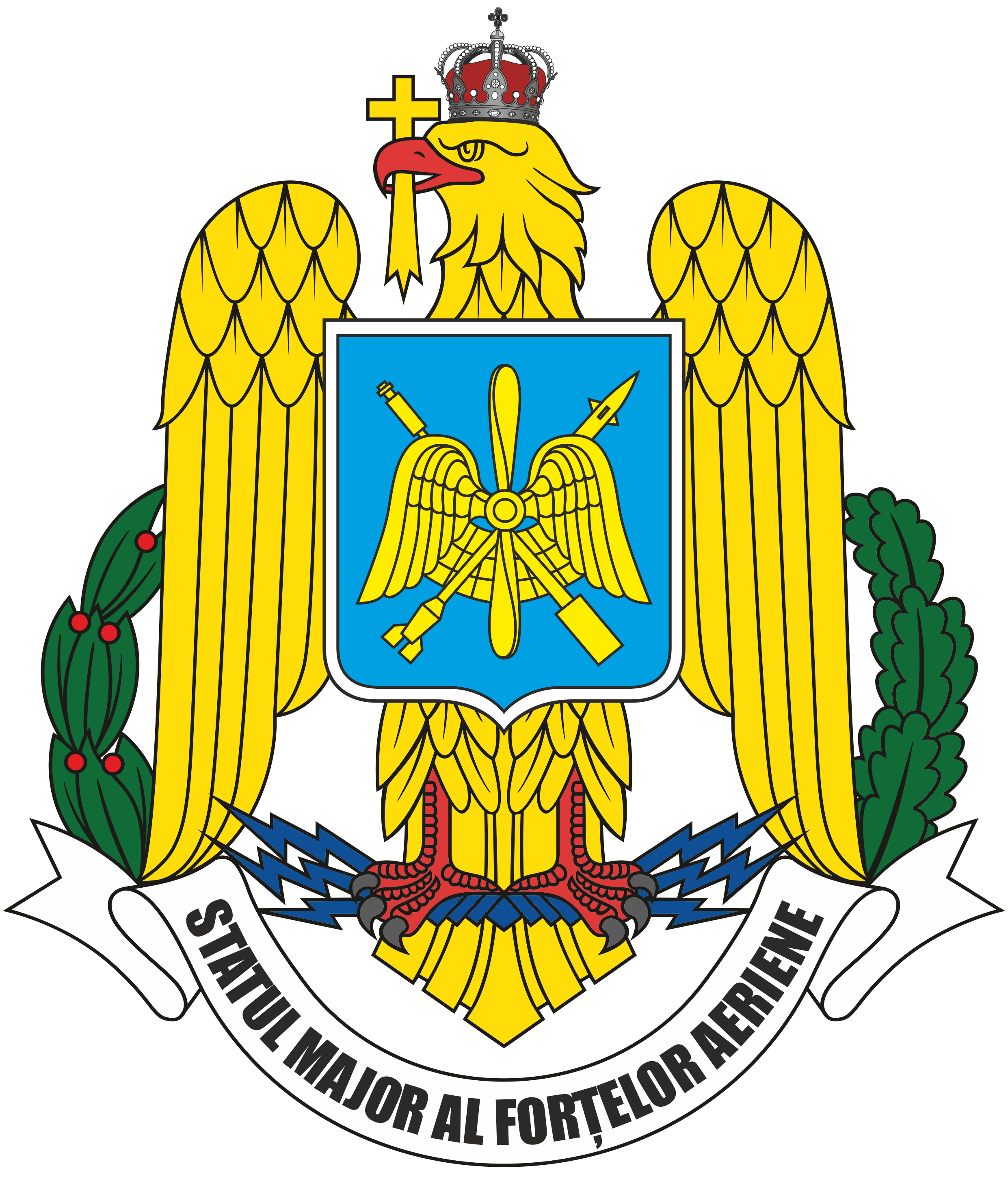
Romanian Air Force Staff

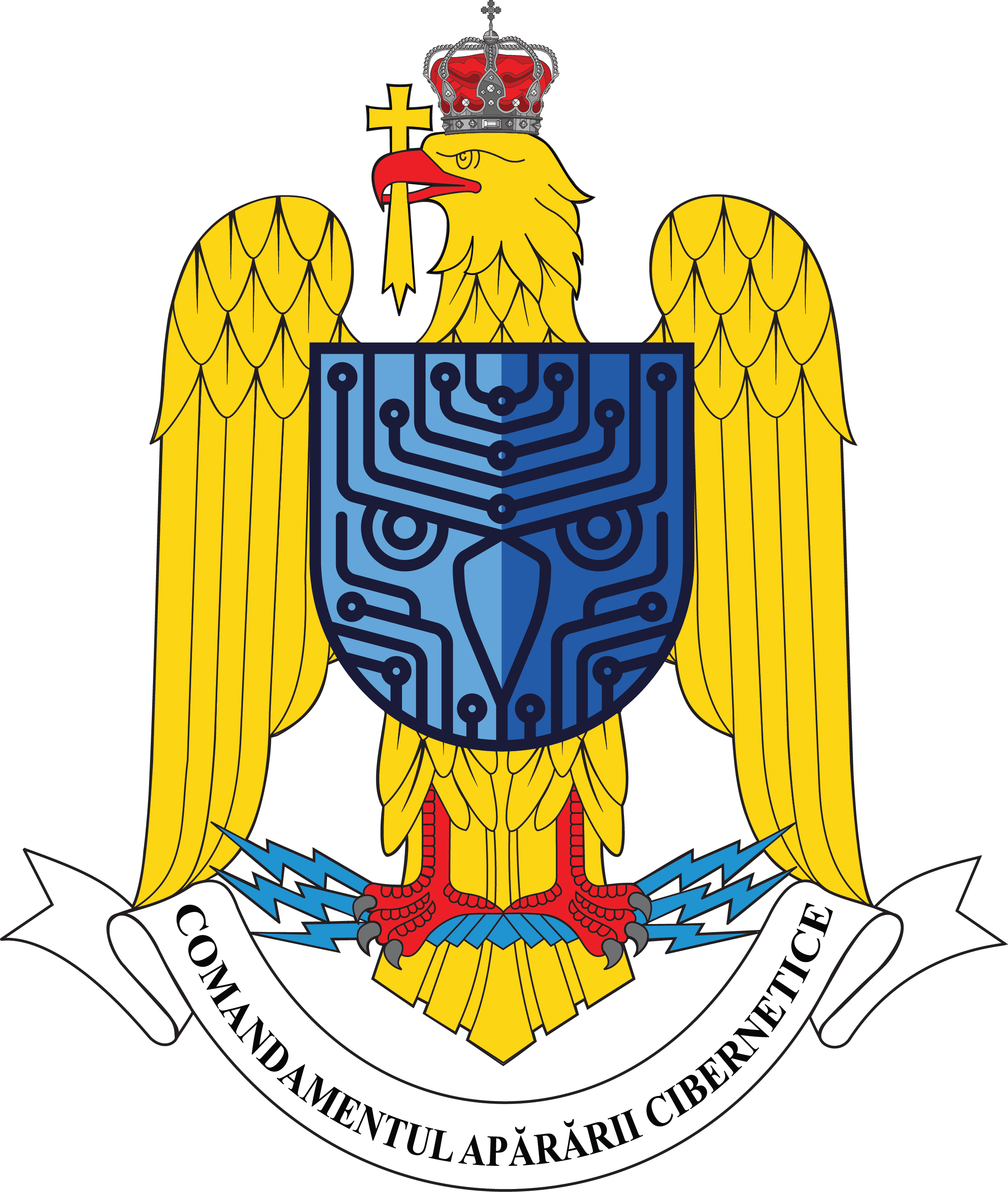
Cyber Defence Command

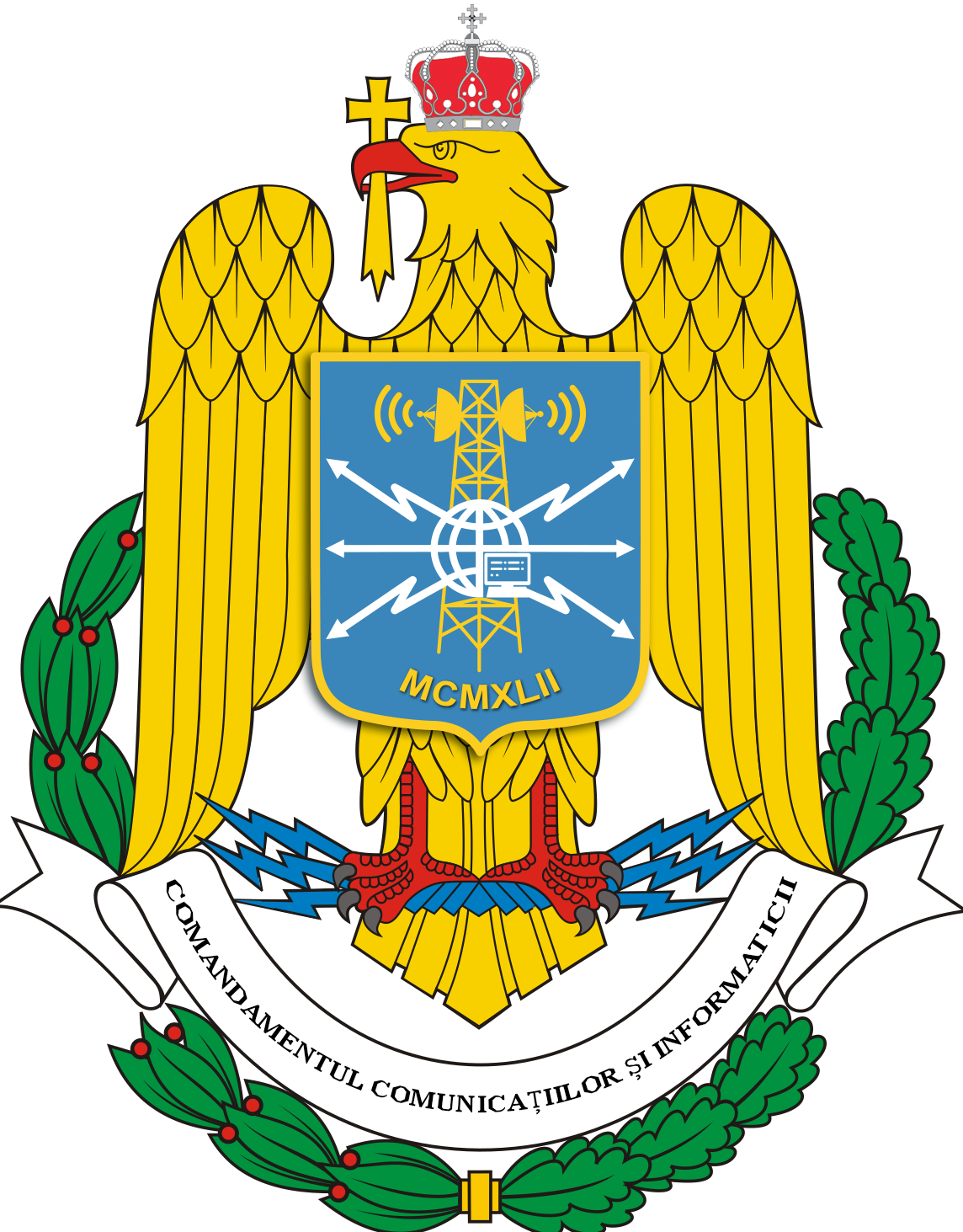
Communications and Informatics Command

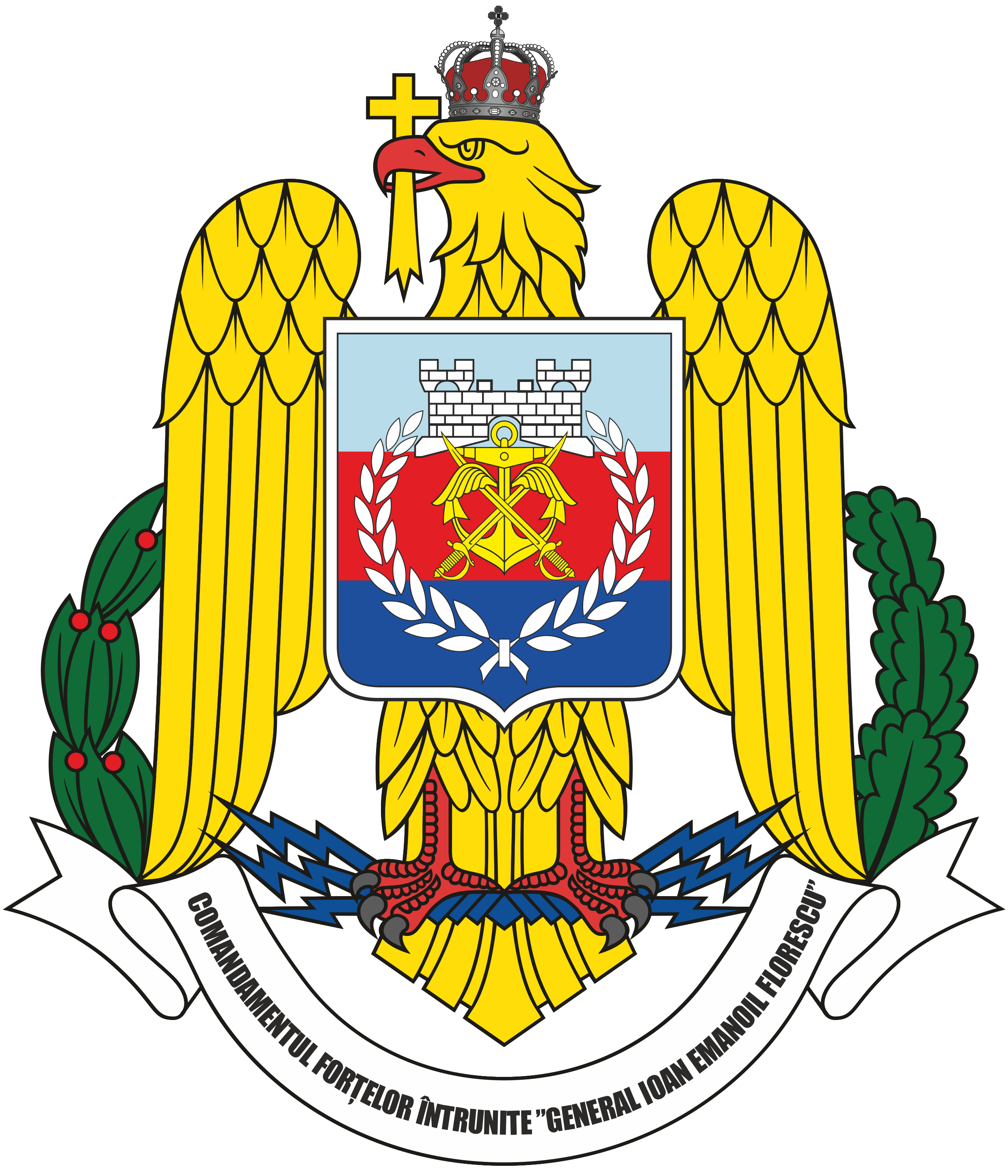
Joint Forces Command

Special Operations Forces Command

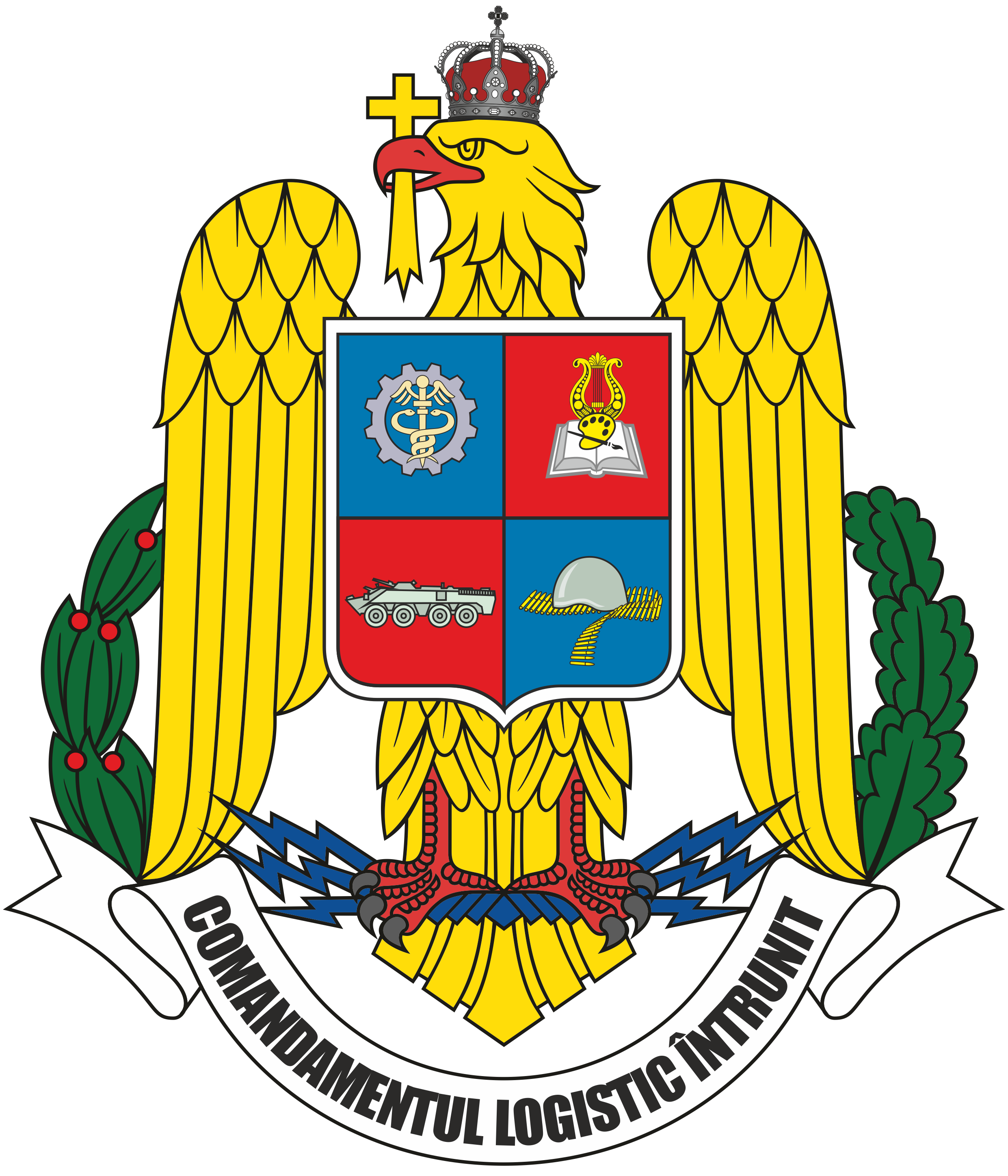
Joint Logistics Command

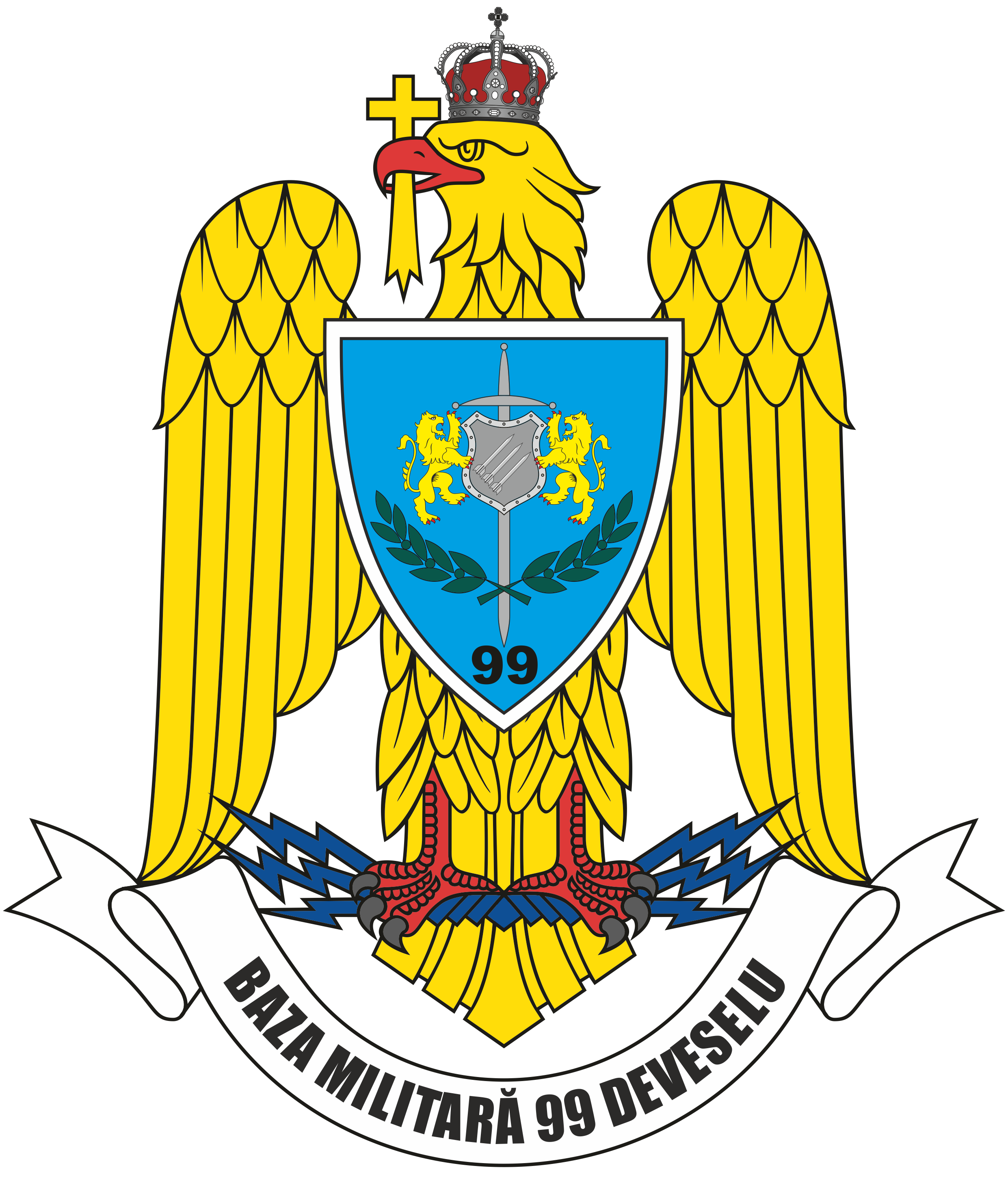
99th Military Base Deveselu

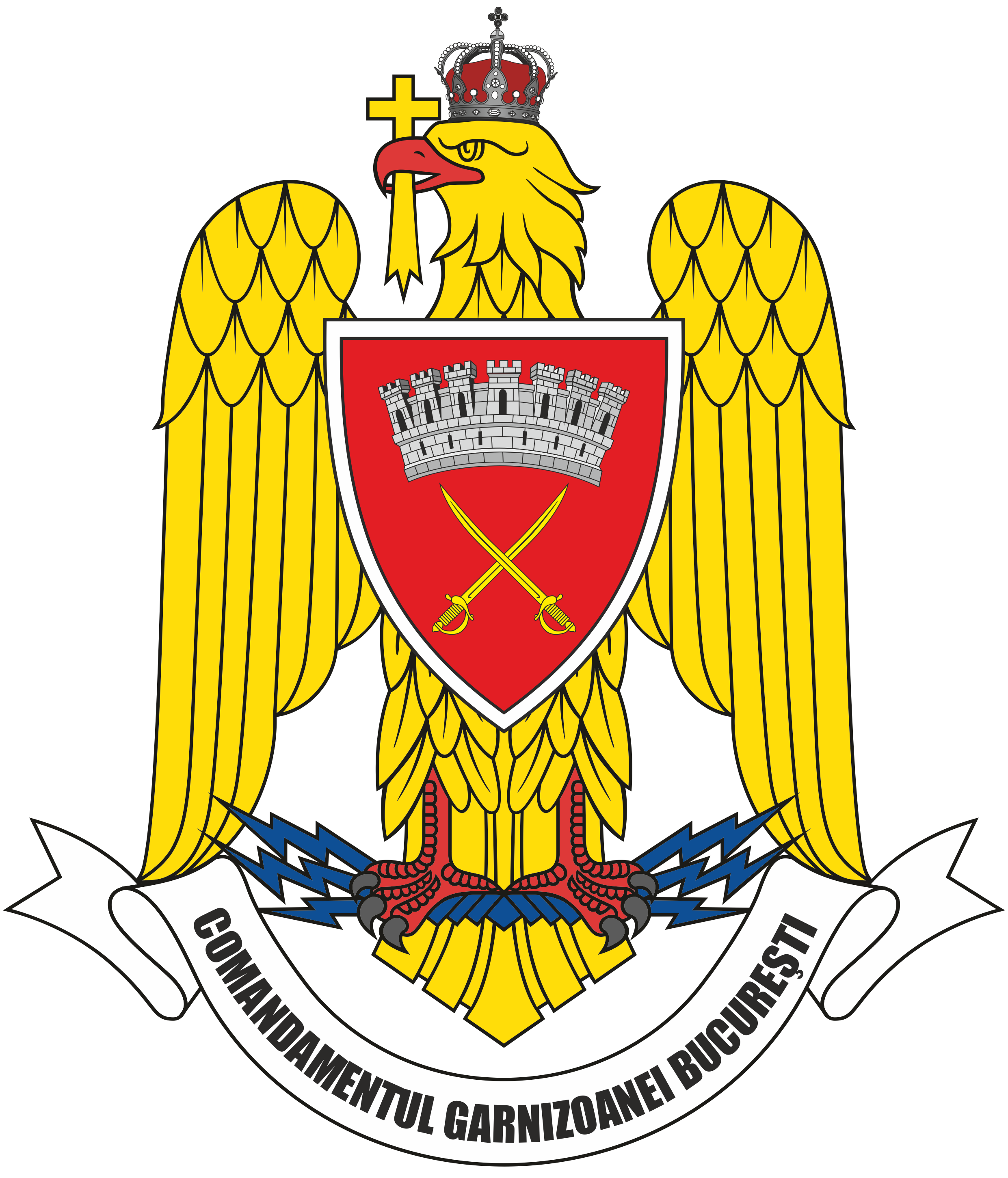
Bucharest Garrison

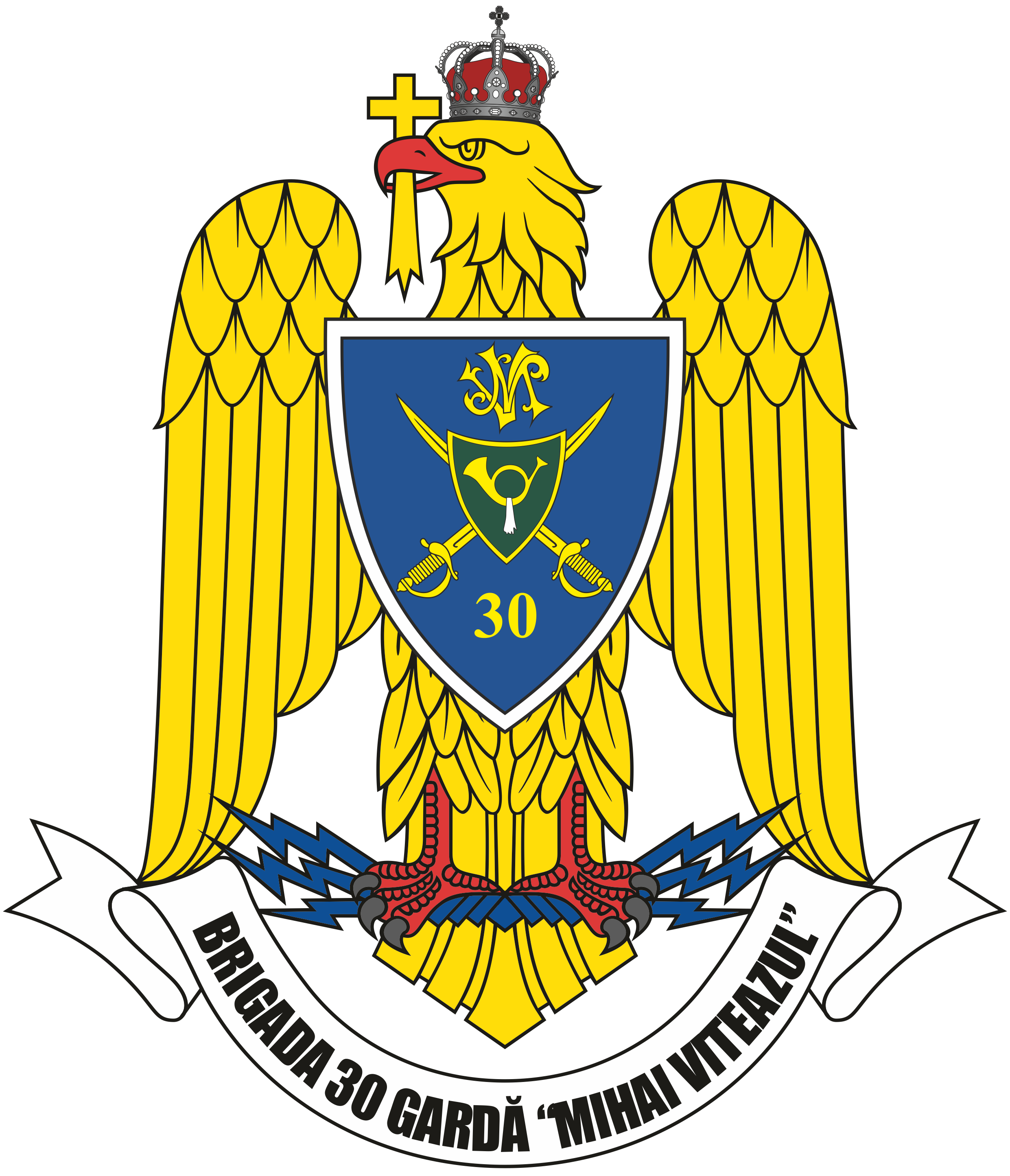
30th Guard Brigade "Mihai Viteazul"

2nd Infantry Division "Getica"

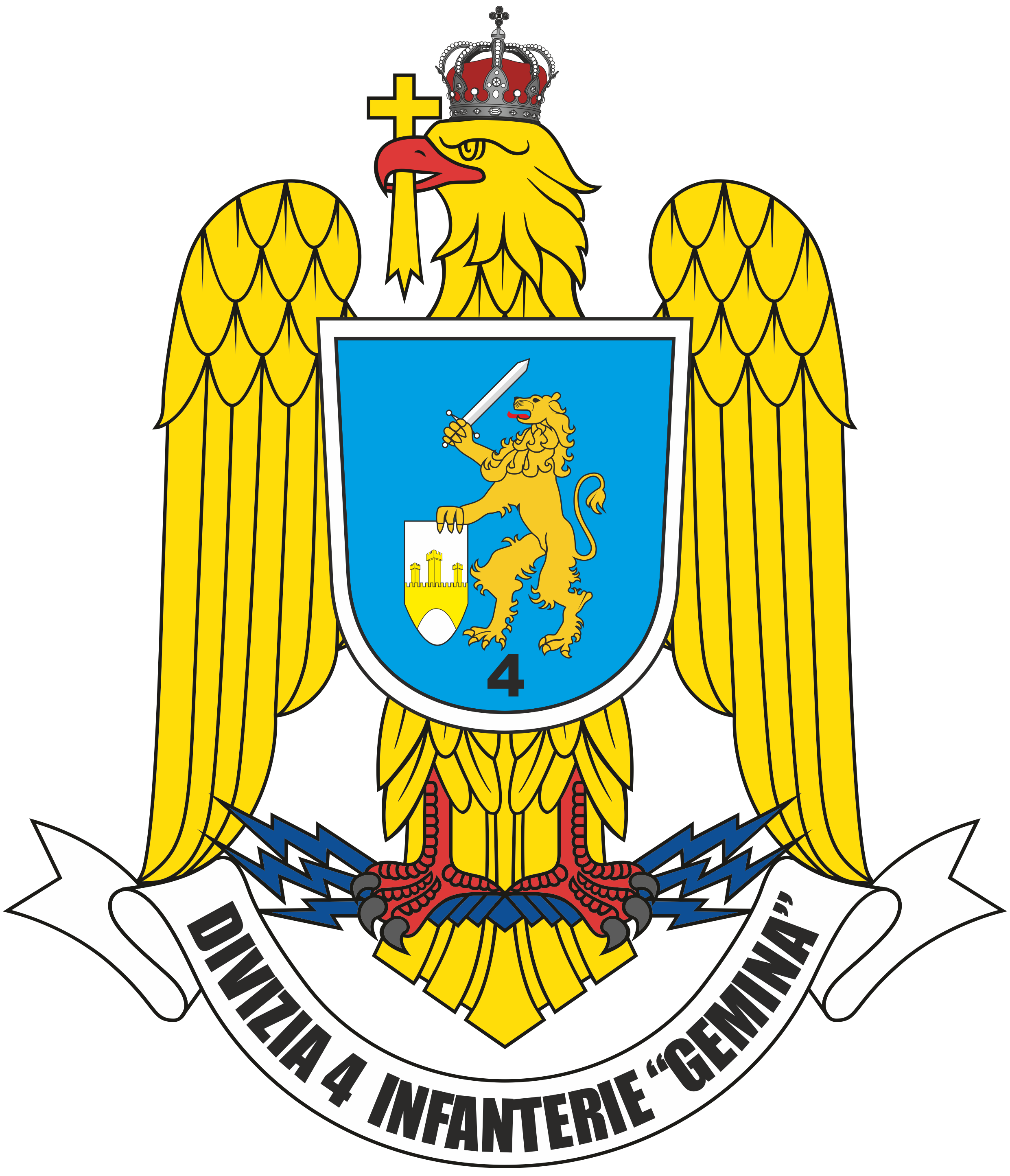
4th Infantry Division "Gemina"

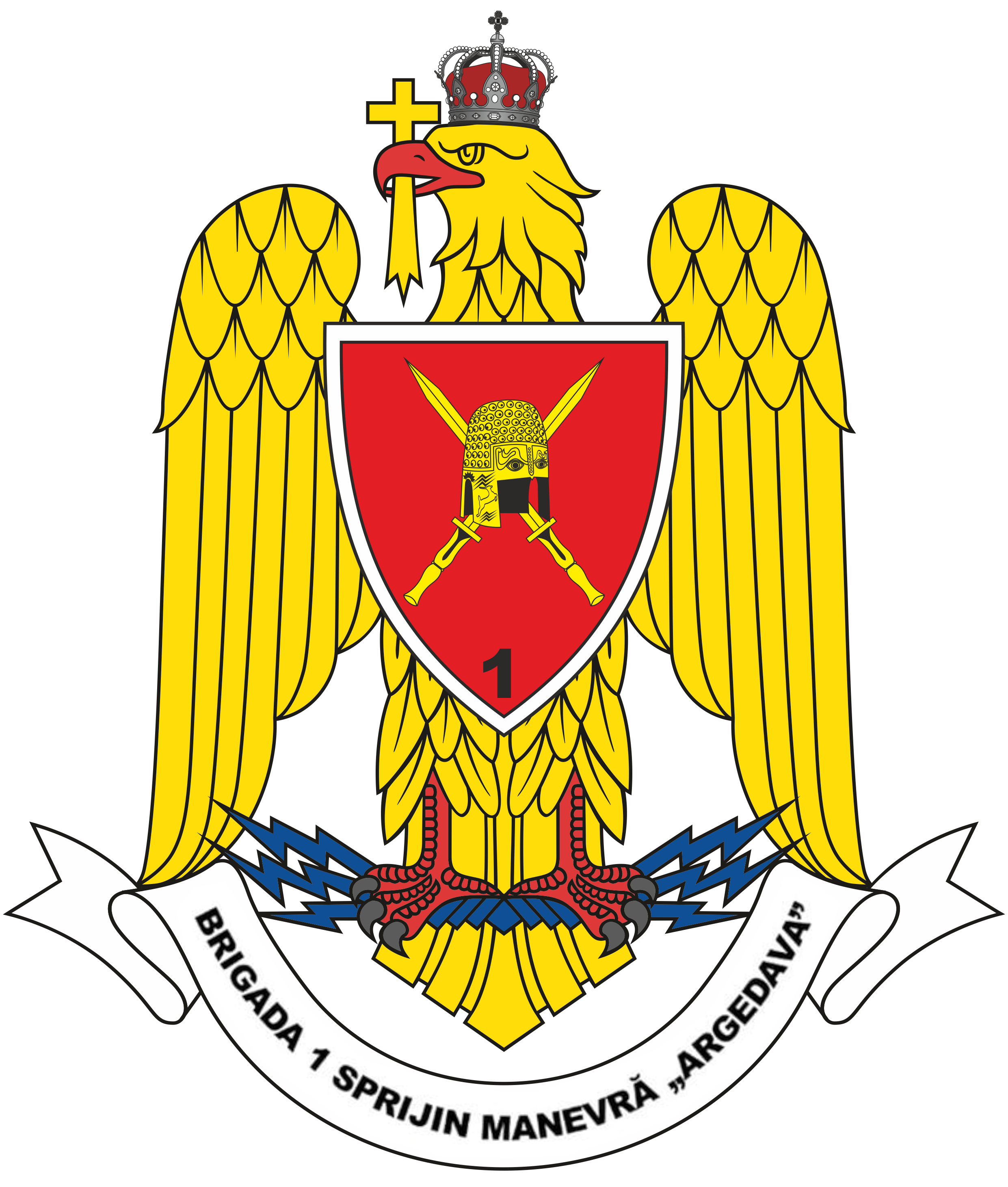
1st Maneuver Support Brigade "Argedava"

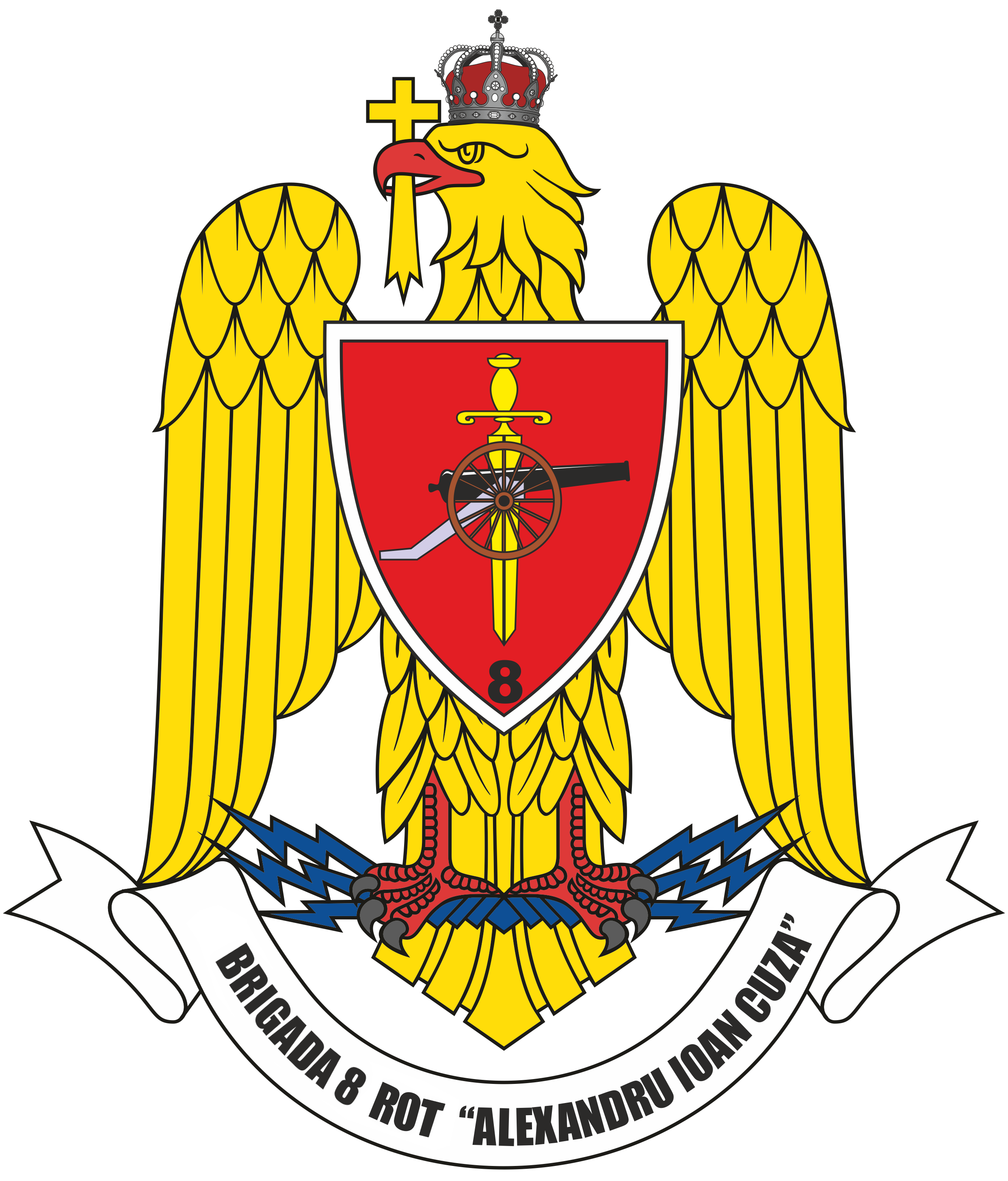
8th Tactical Operational Missile Brigade "Alexandru Ioan Cuza"

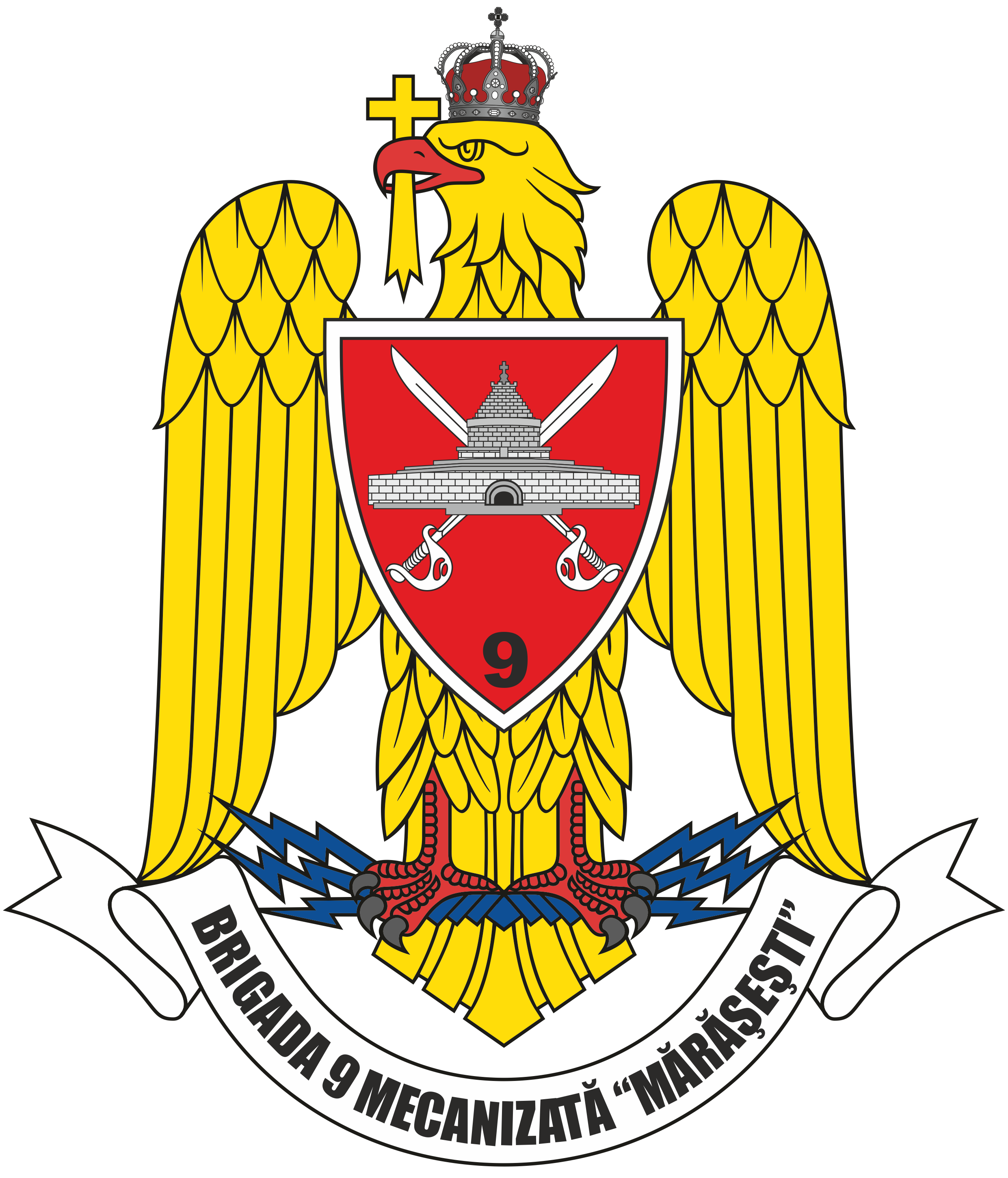
9th Mechanized Brigade "Mărășești"

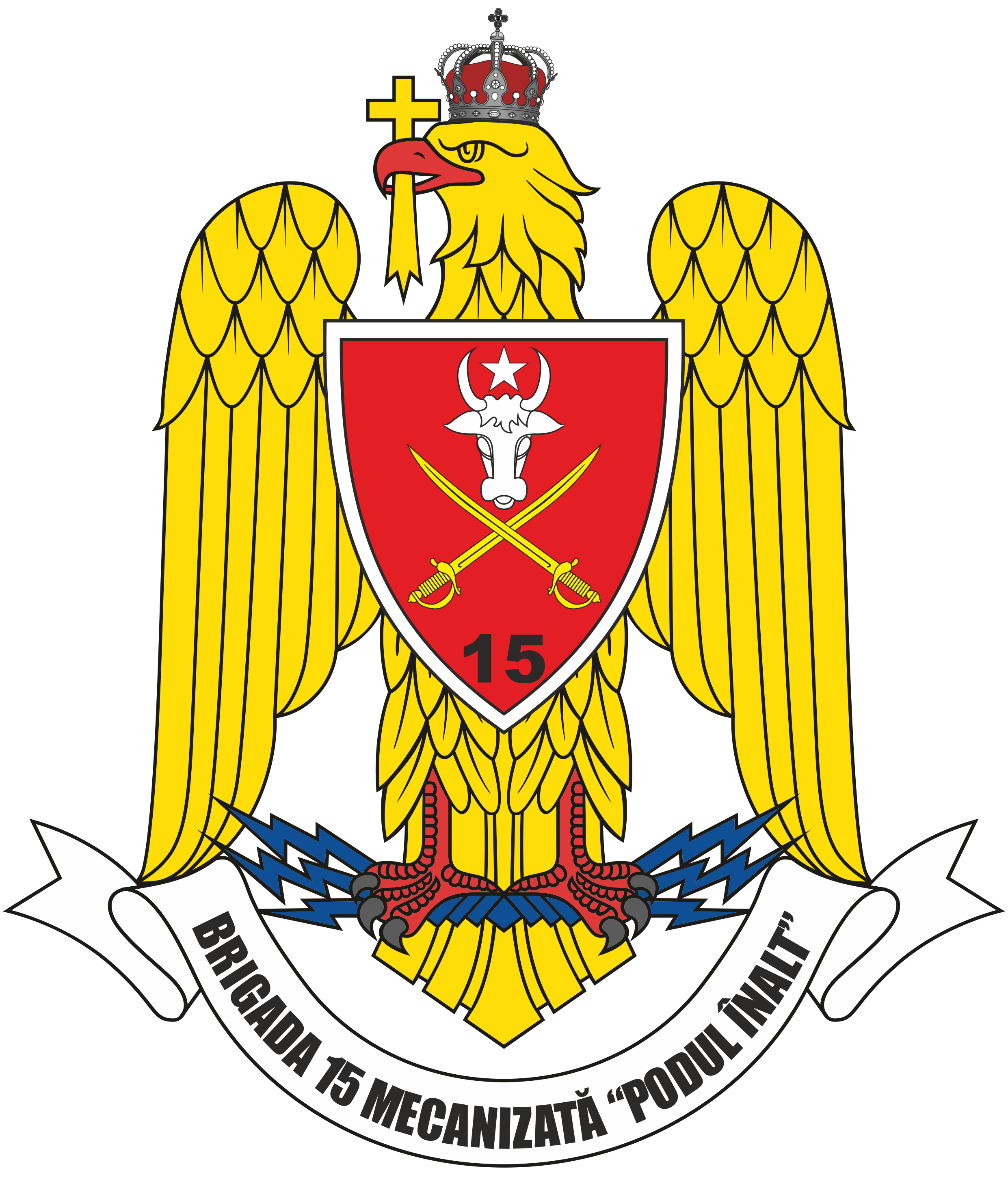
15th Mechanized Brigade "Podul Înalt"

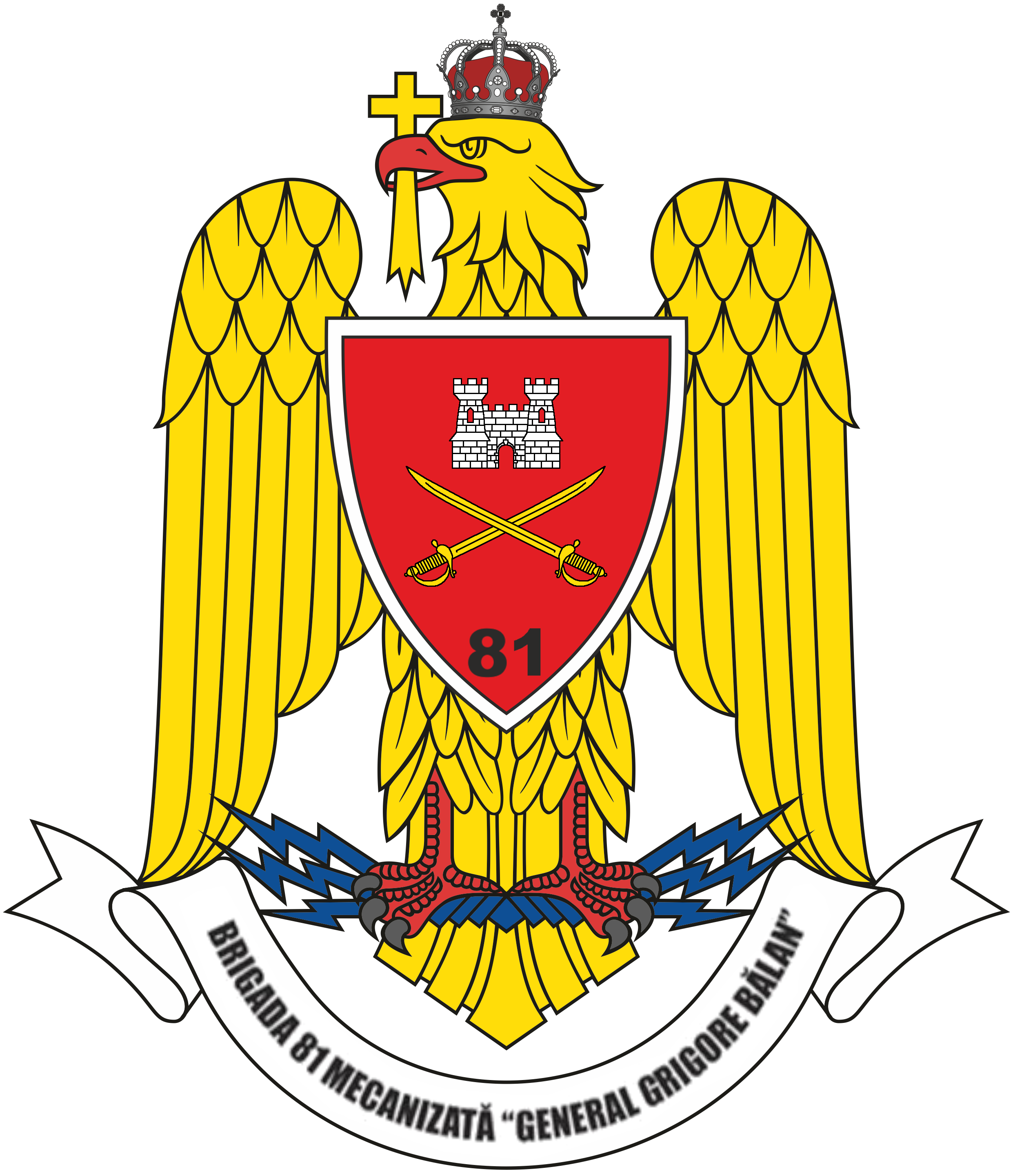
81st Mechanized Brigade "General Grigore Bălan"

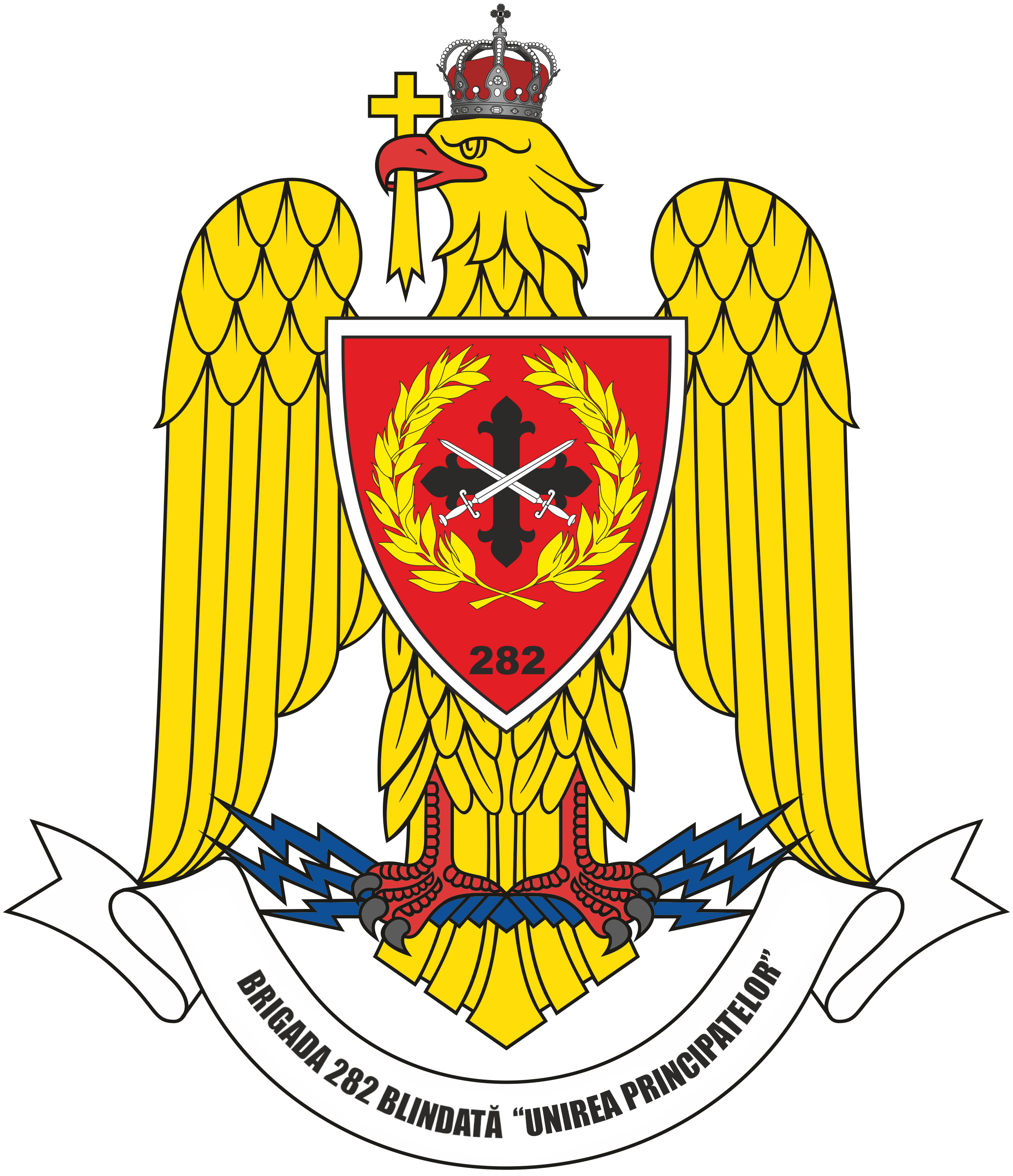
282nd Armored Brigade "Unirea Principatelor"

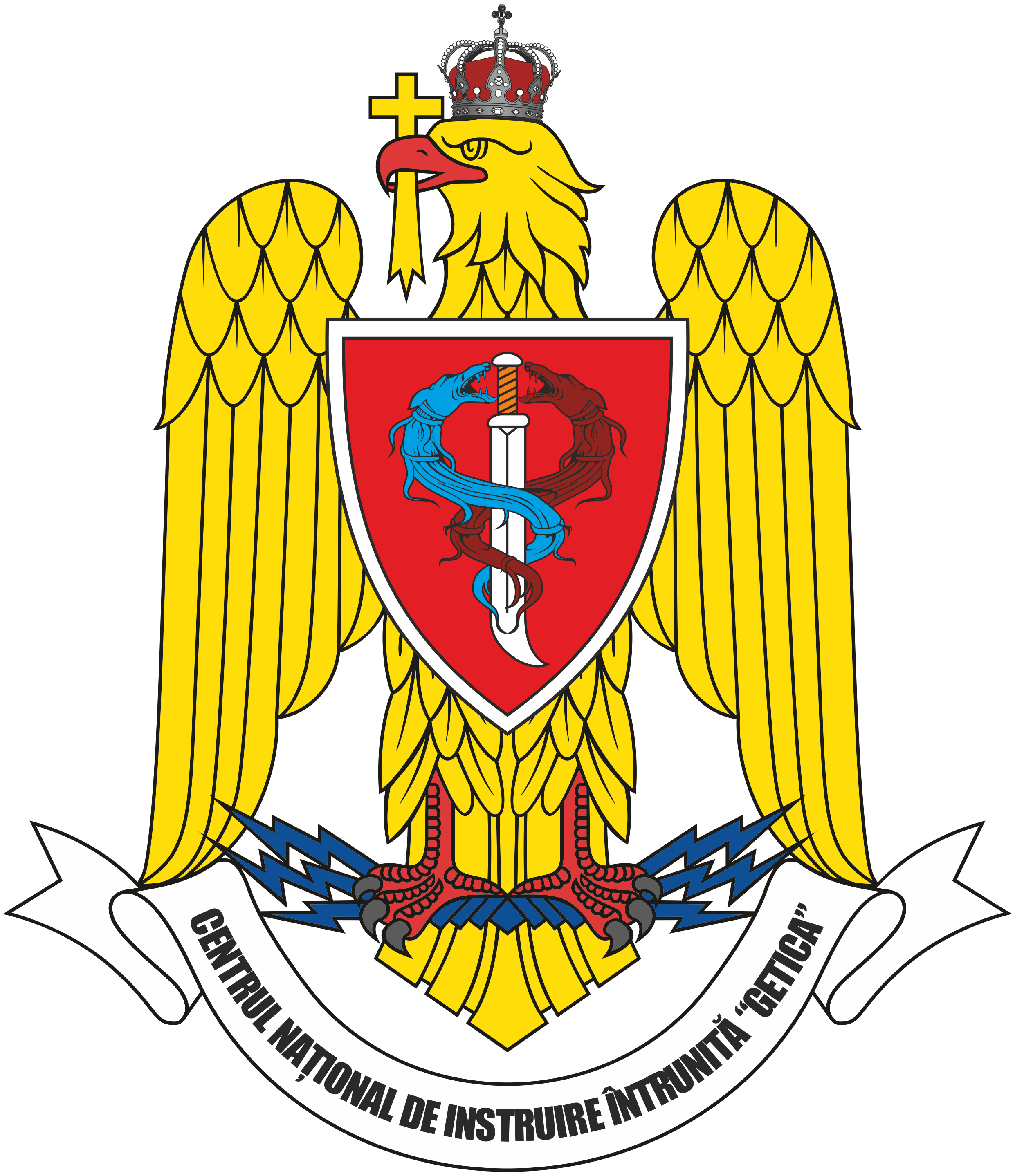
National Joint Training Center "Getica"

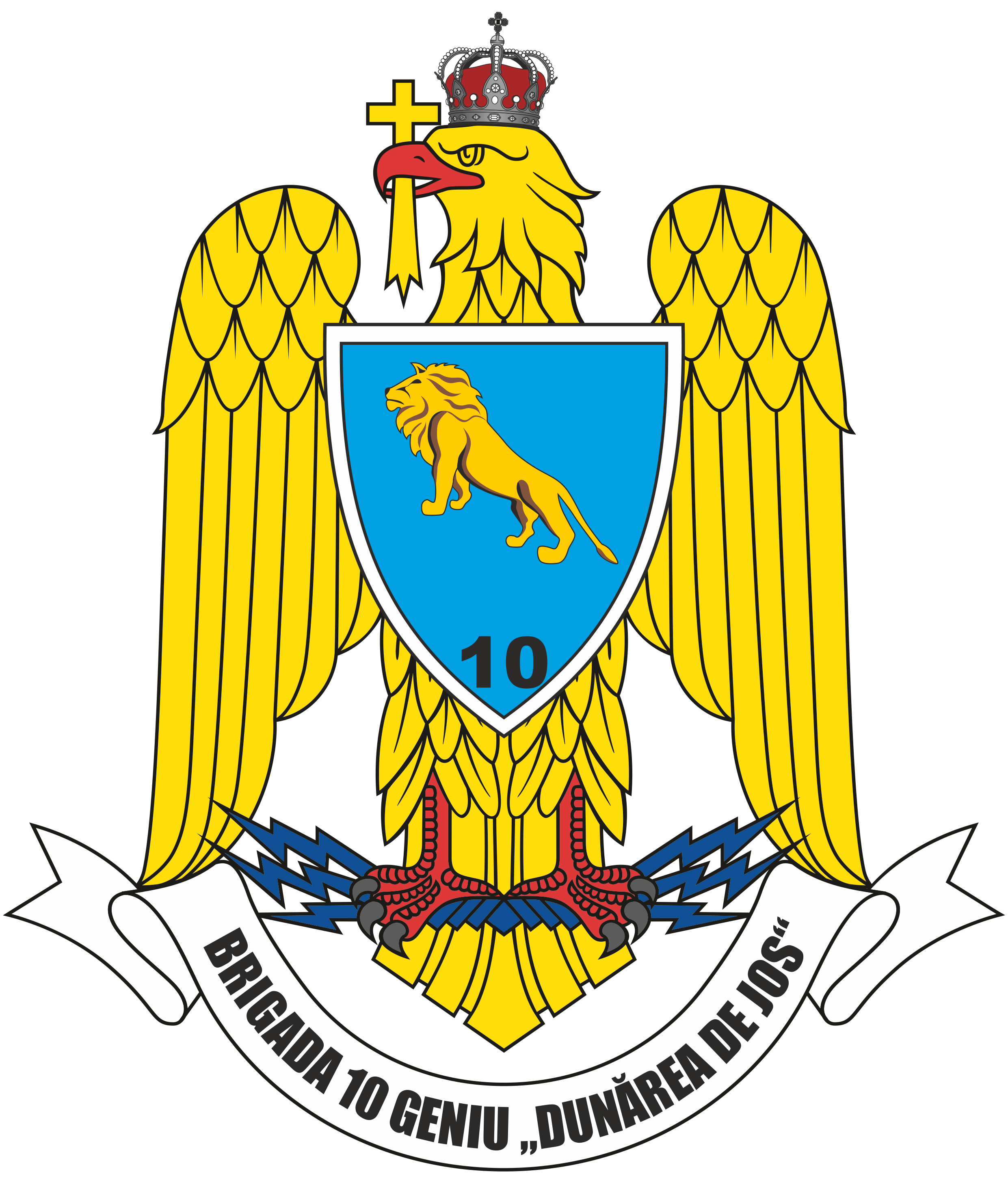
10th Engineer Brigade "Dunărea de Jos"

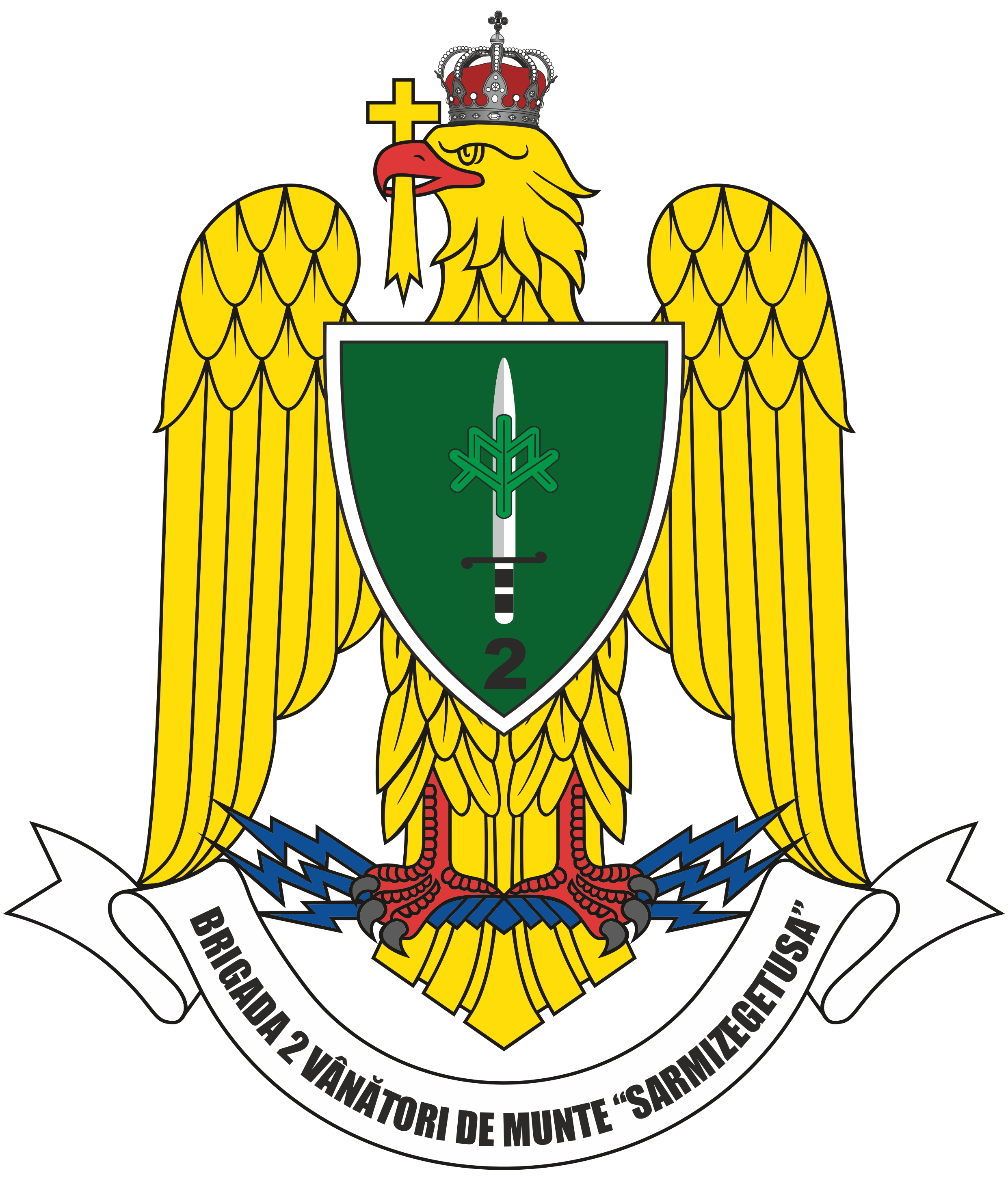
2nd Mountain Troops Brigade "Sarmizegetusa"

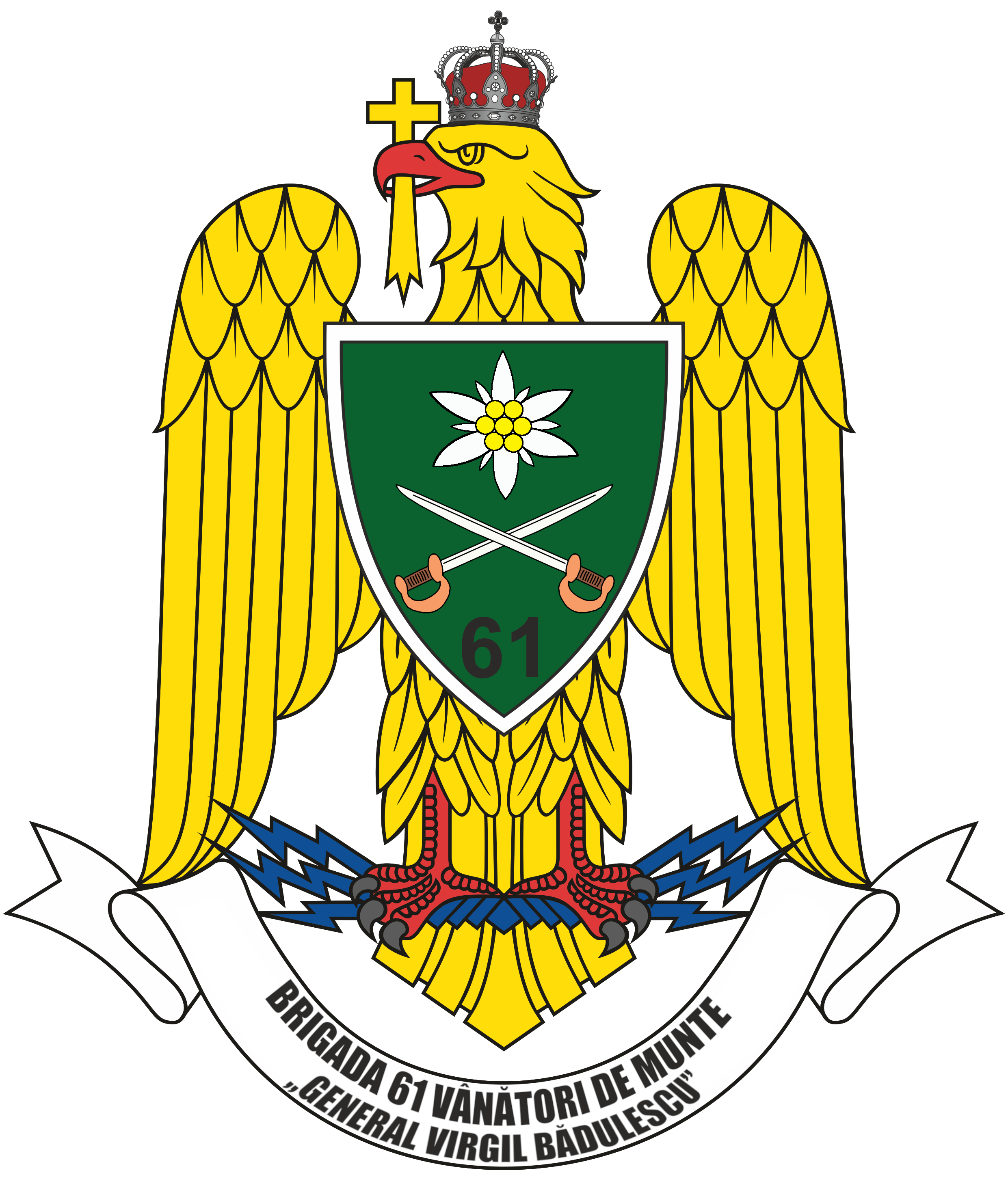
61st Mountain Troops Brigade "General Virgil Bădulescu"

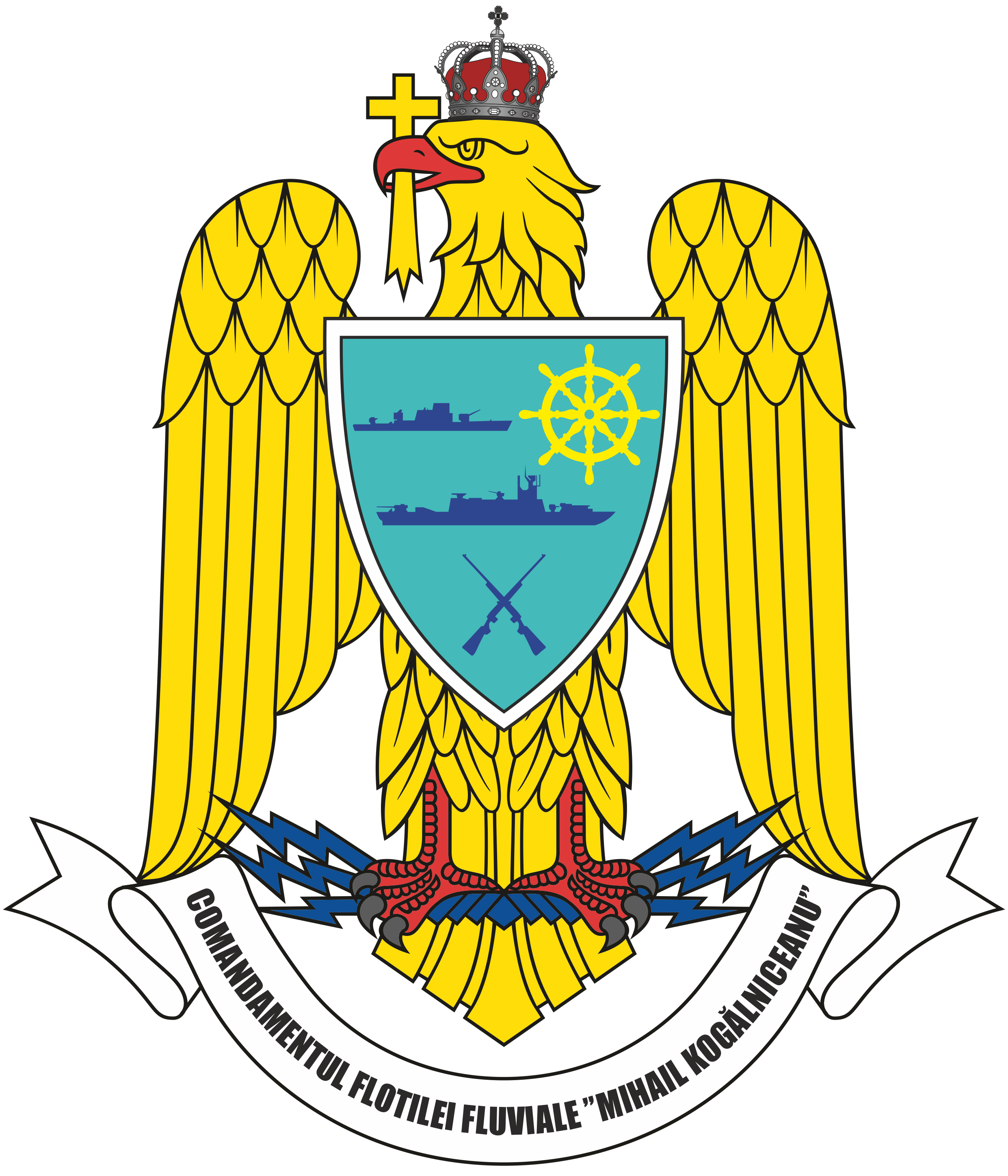
River Flotilla "Mihail Kogălniceanu"

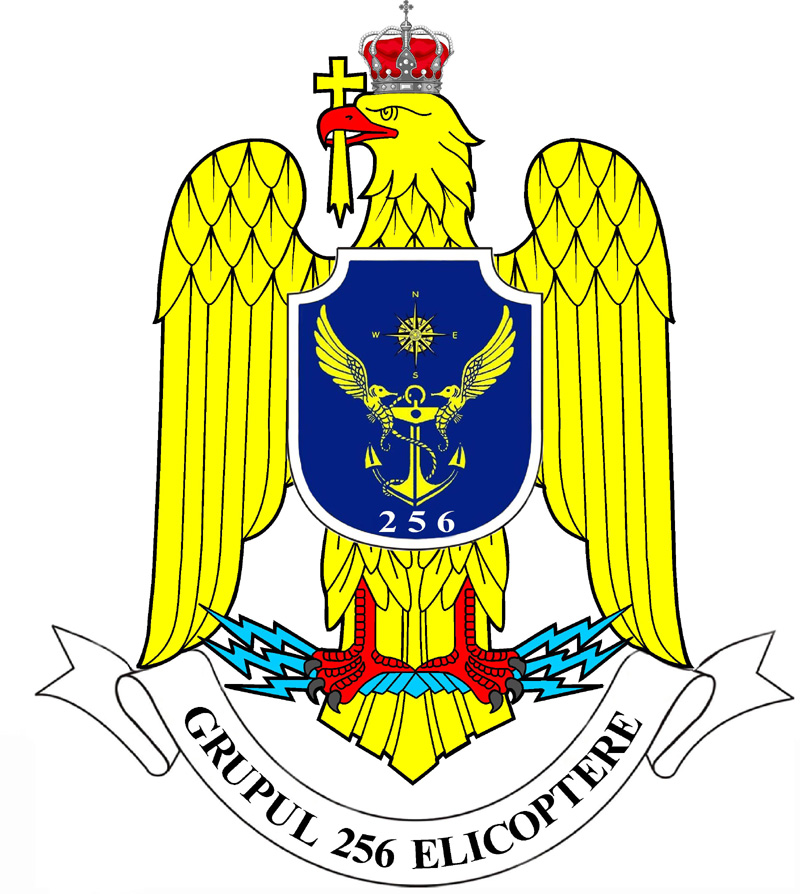
256th Helicopter Group

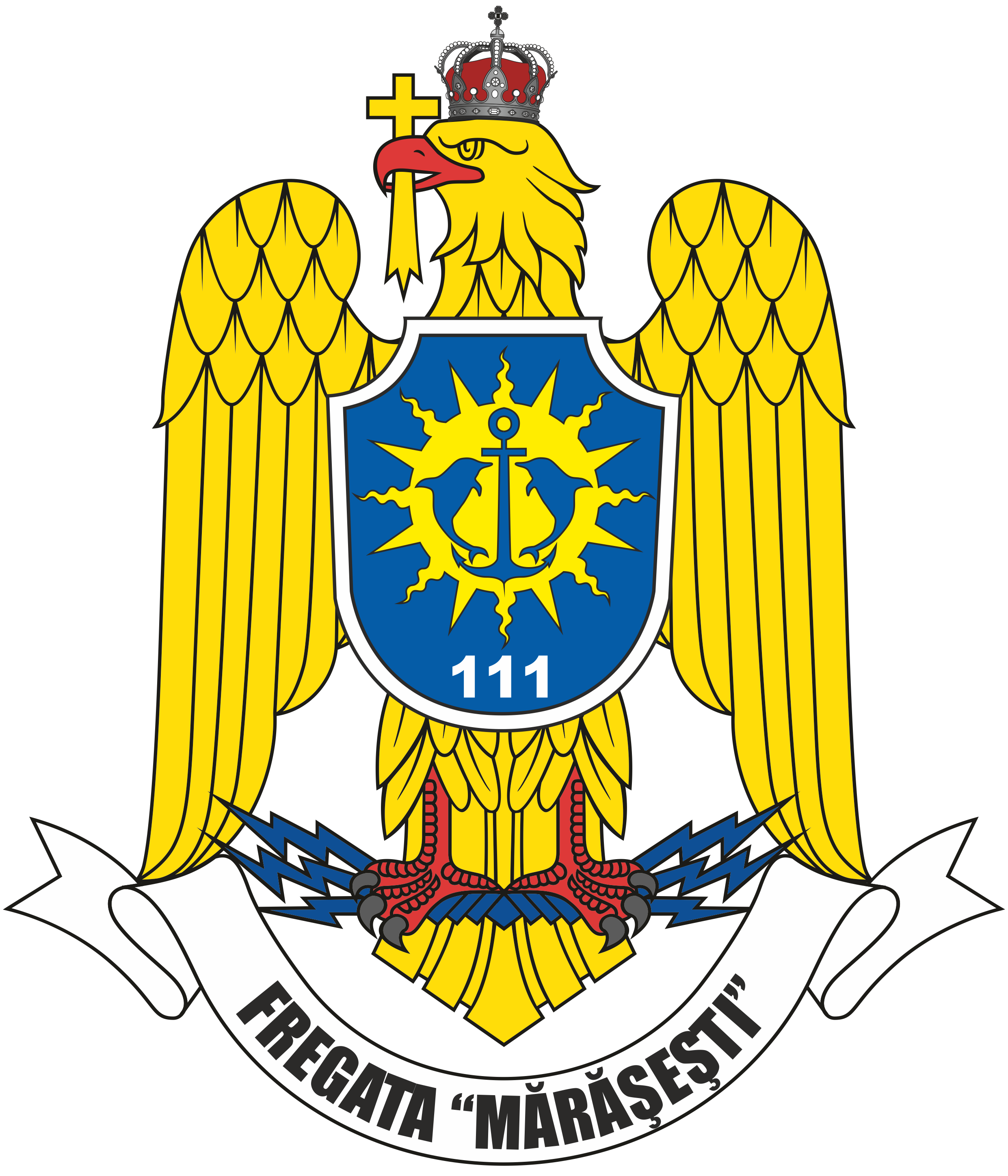
Mărășești (F111)

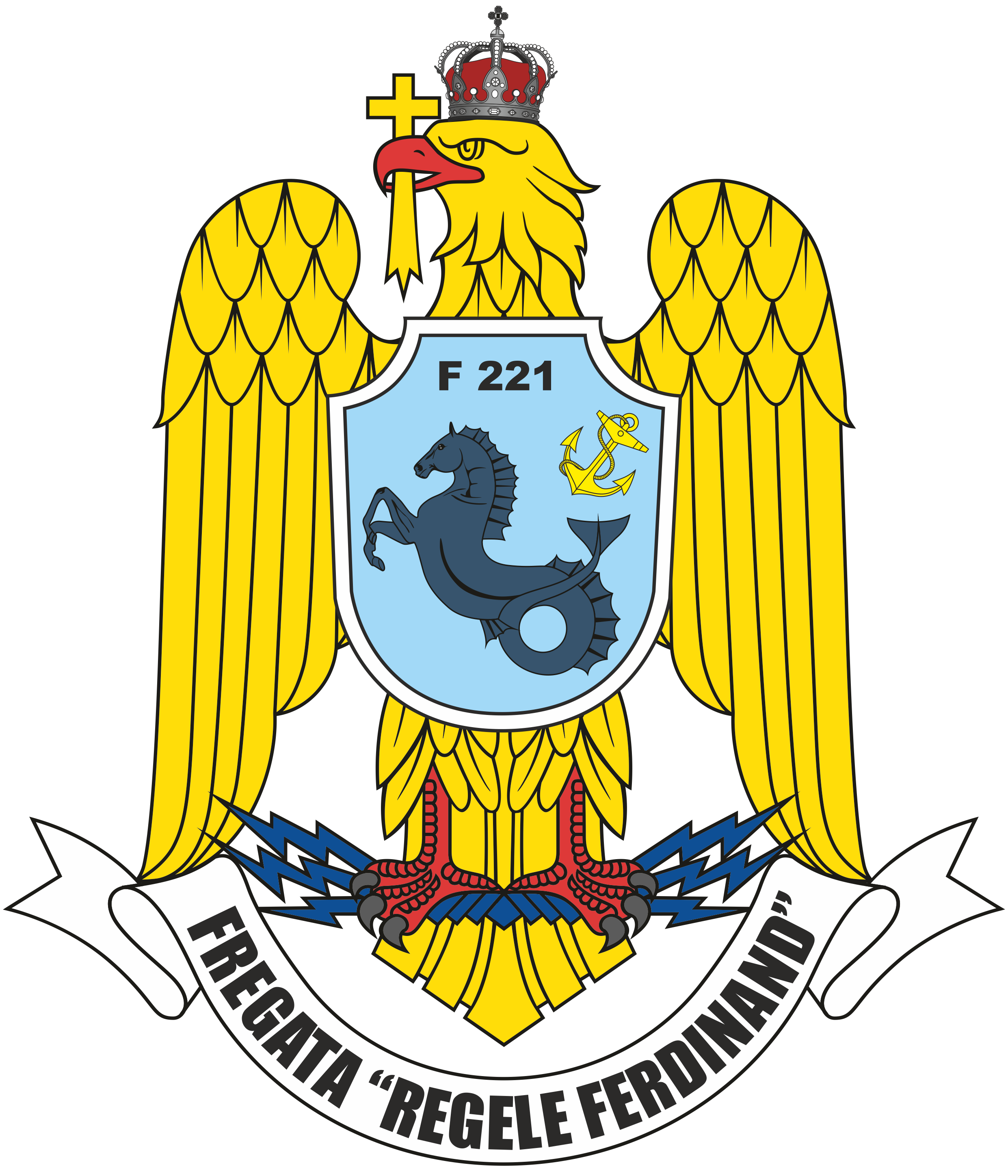
Regele Ferdinand (F221)

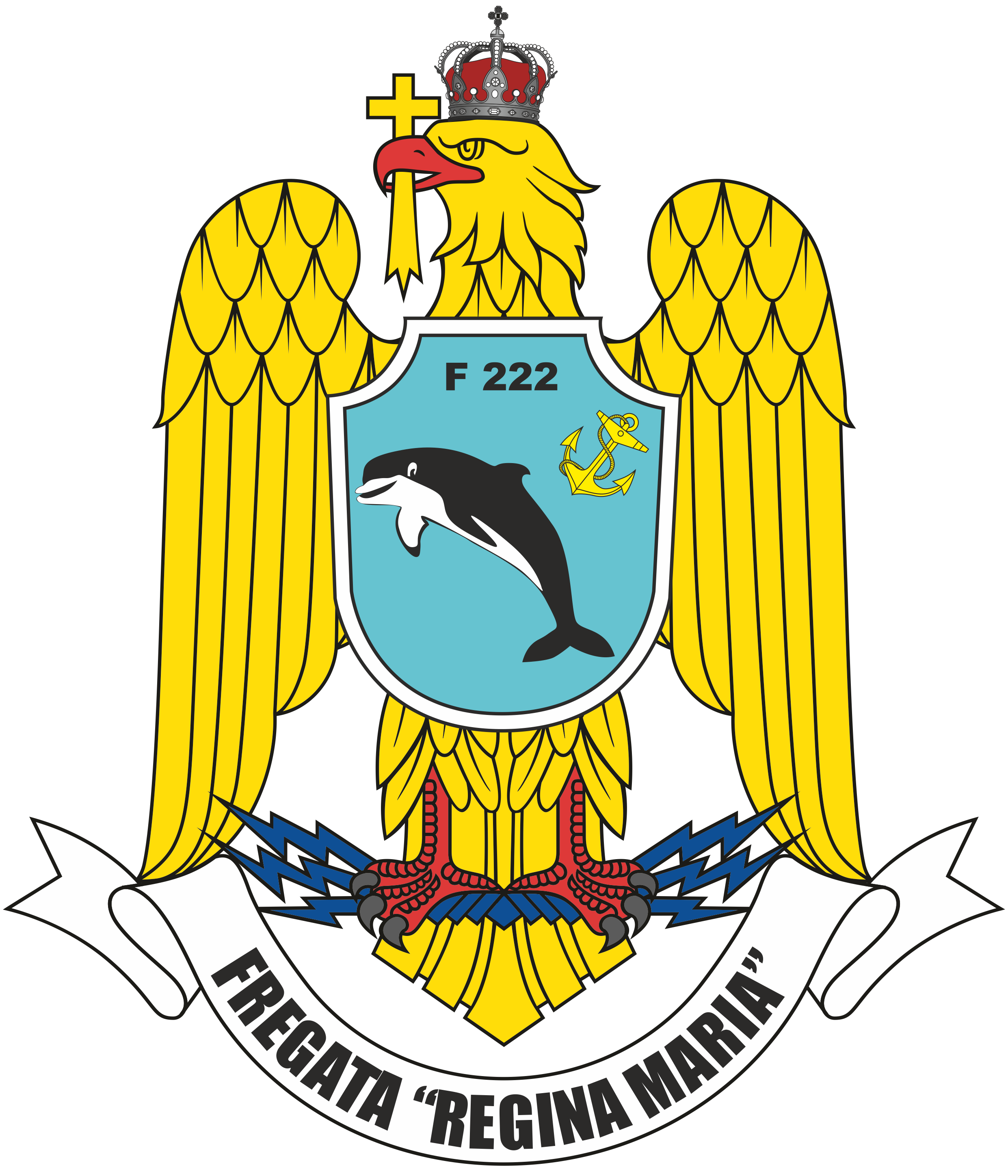
Regina Maria (F222)

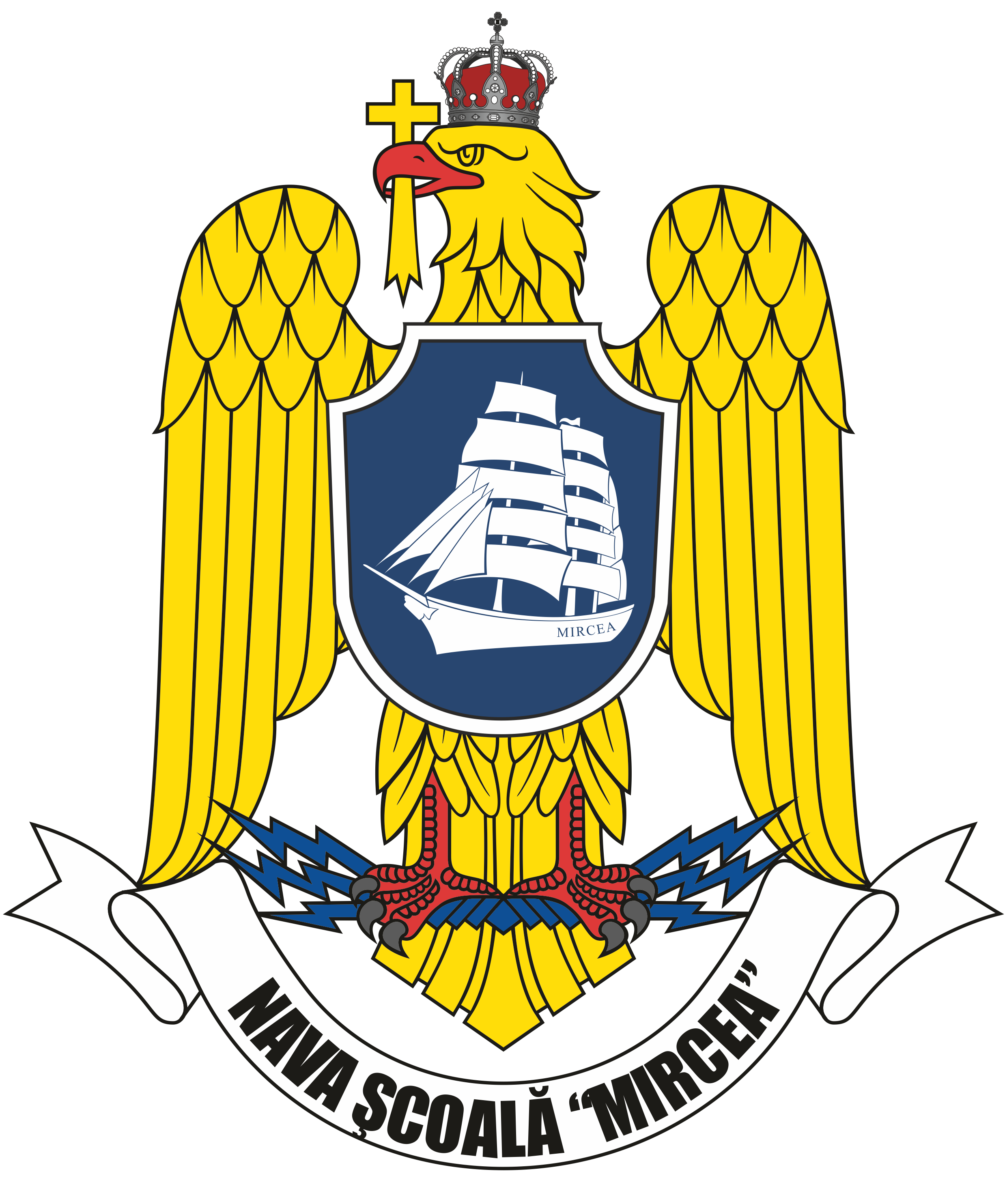
Mircea

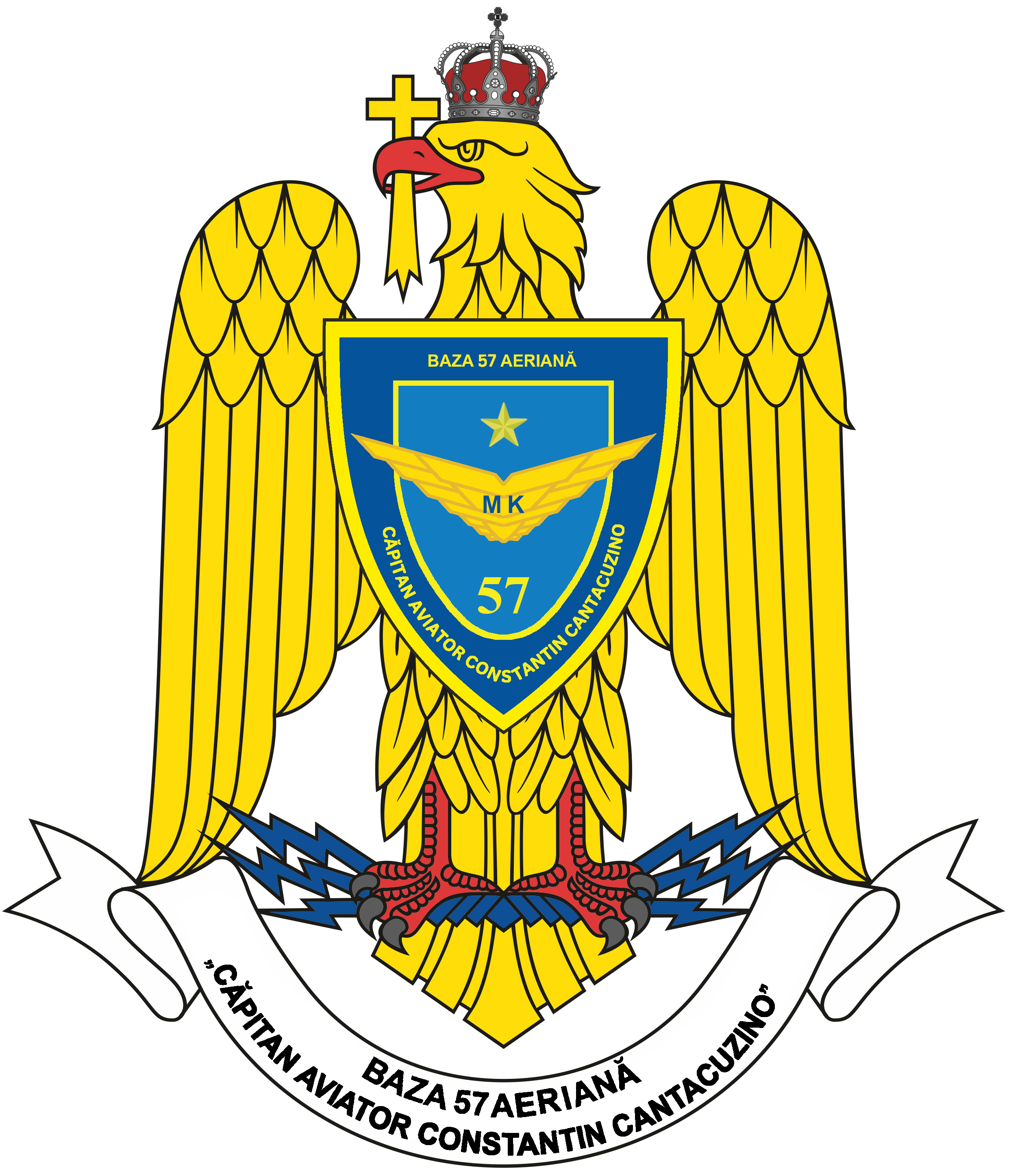
57th Air Base "Căpitan Aviator Constantin Cantacuzino"

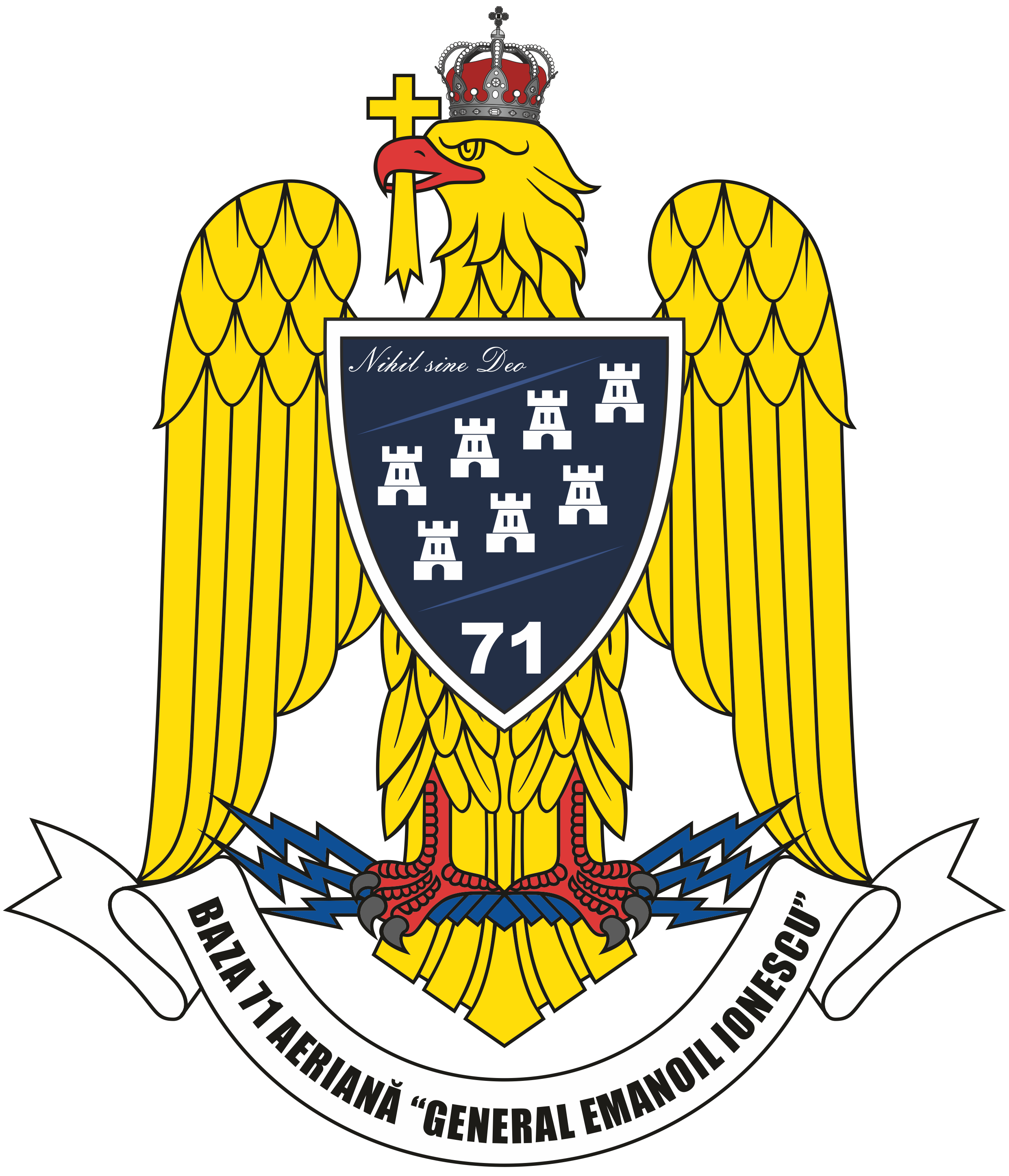
71st Air Base "General Emanoil Ionescu"

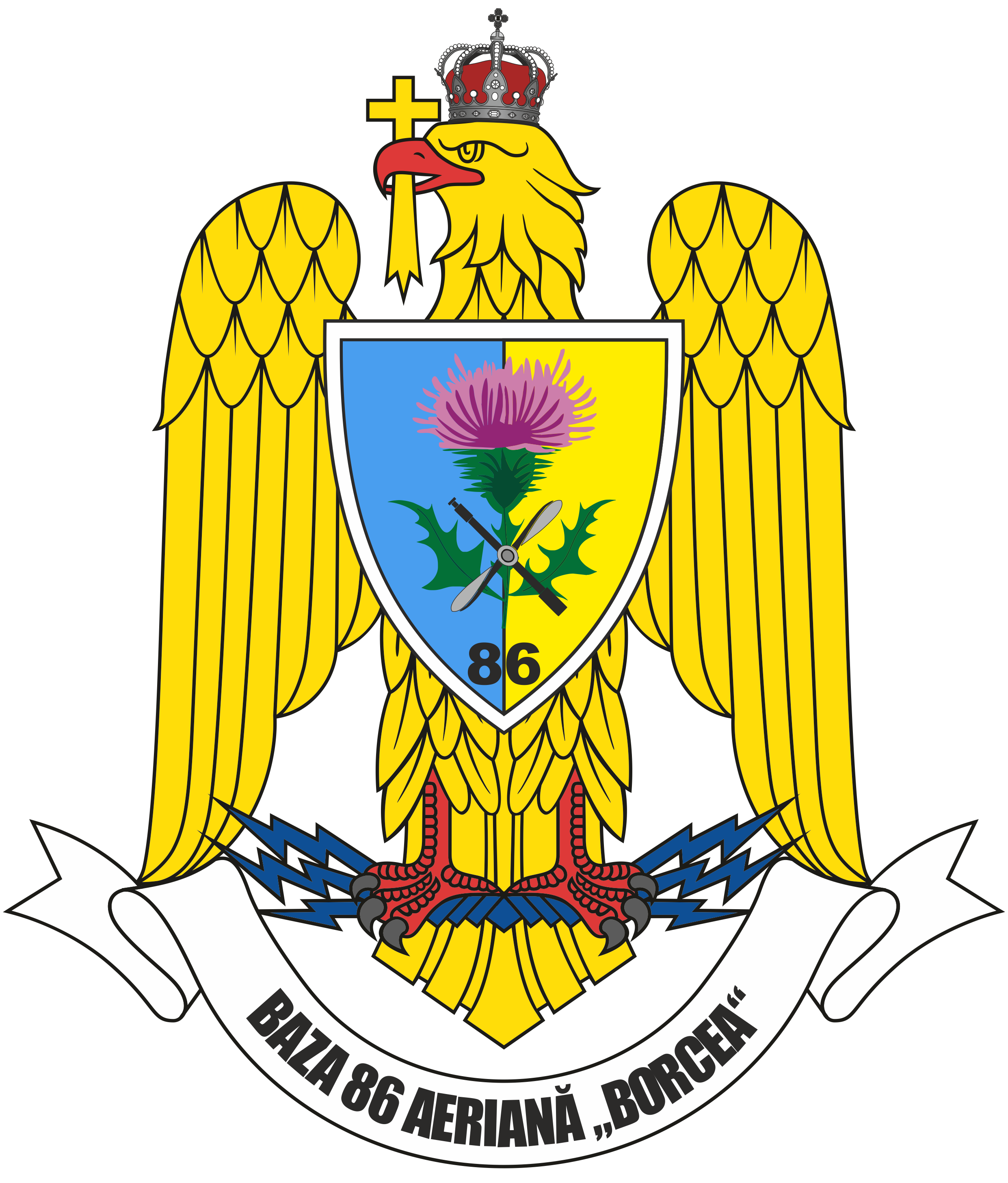
86th Air Base "Locotenent aviator Gheorghe Mociorniță"

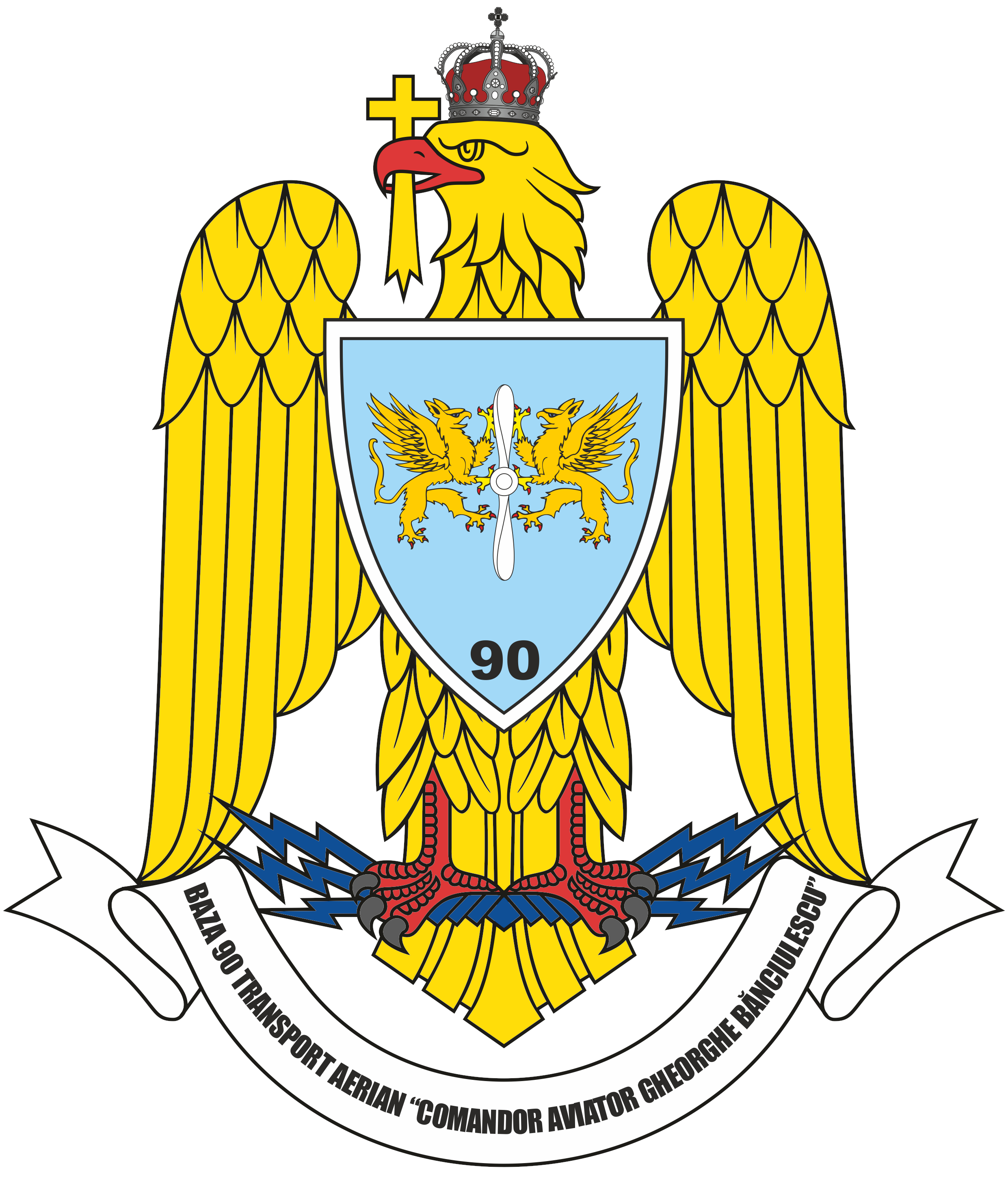
90th Airlift Base "Comandor Aviator Gheorghe Bănciulescu"

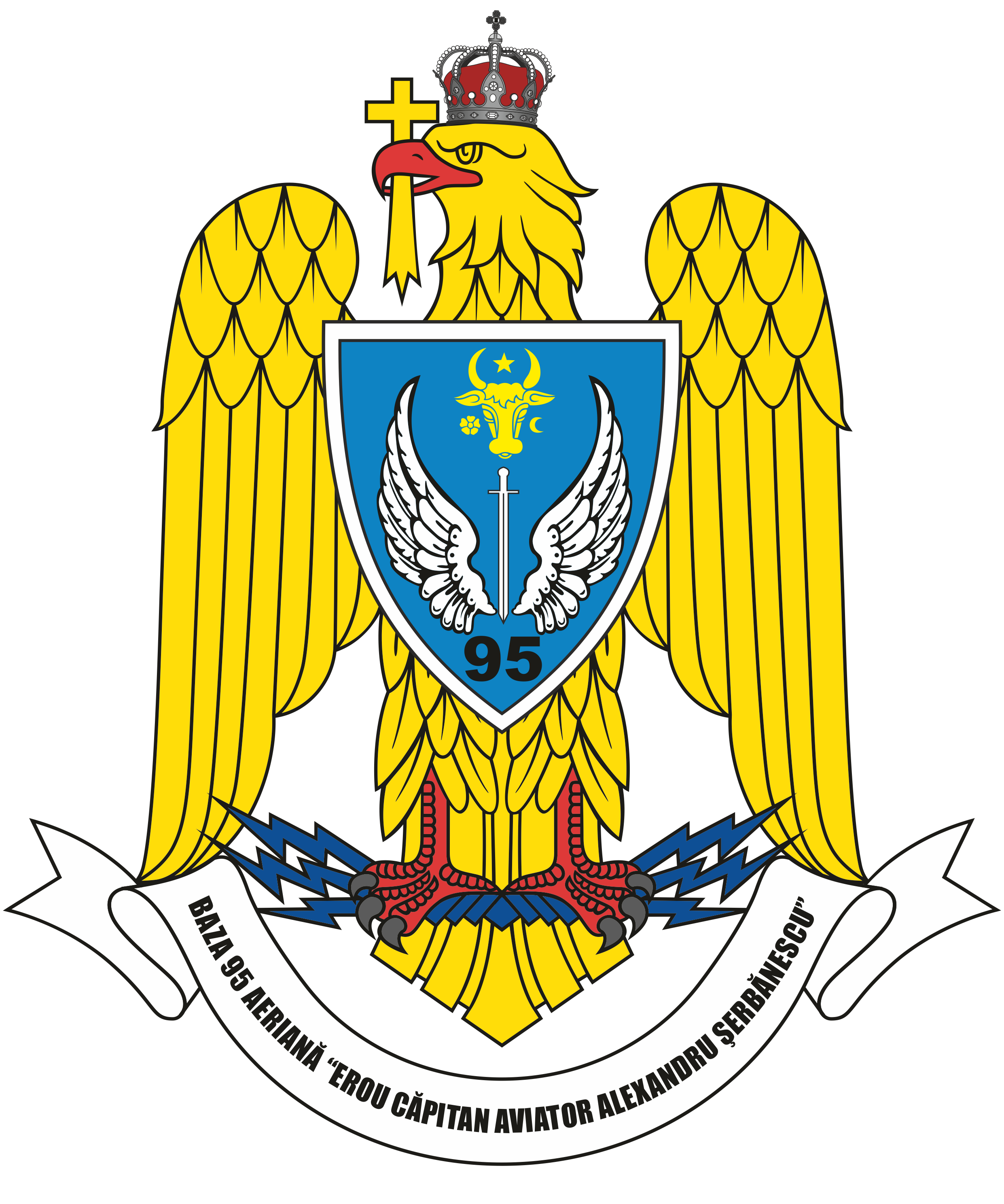
95th Air Base "Căpitan Aviator Alexandru Șerbănescu"

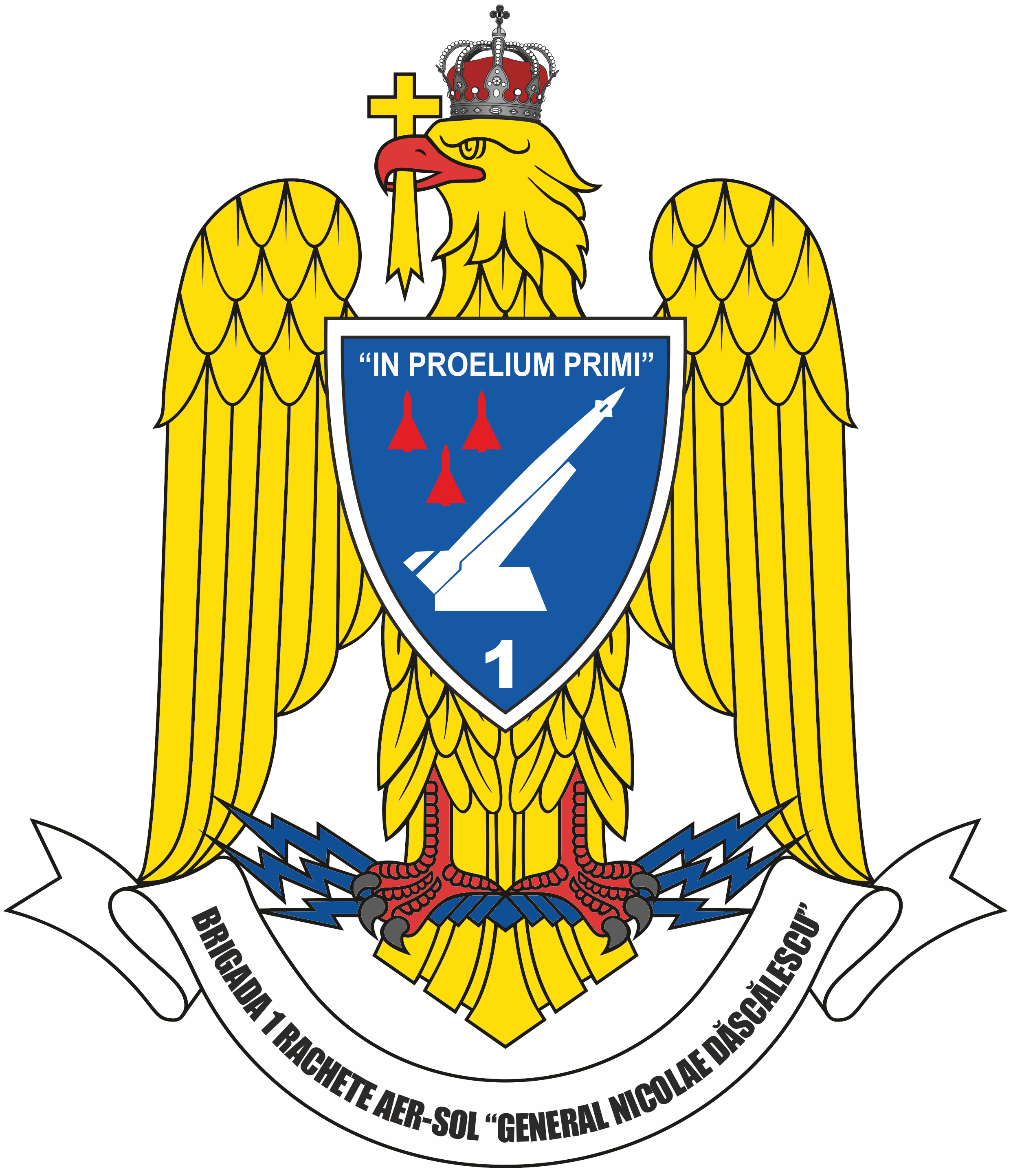
1st Surface to Air Missiles Brigade "General Nicolae Dăscălescu"

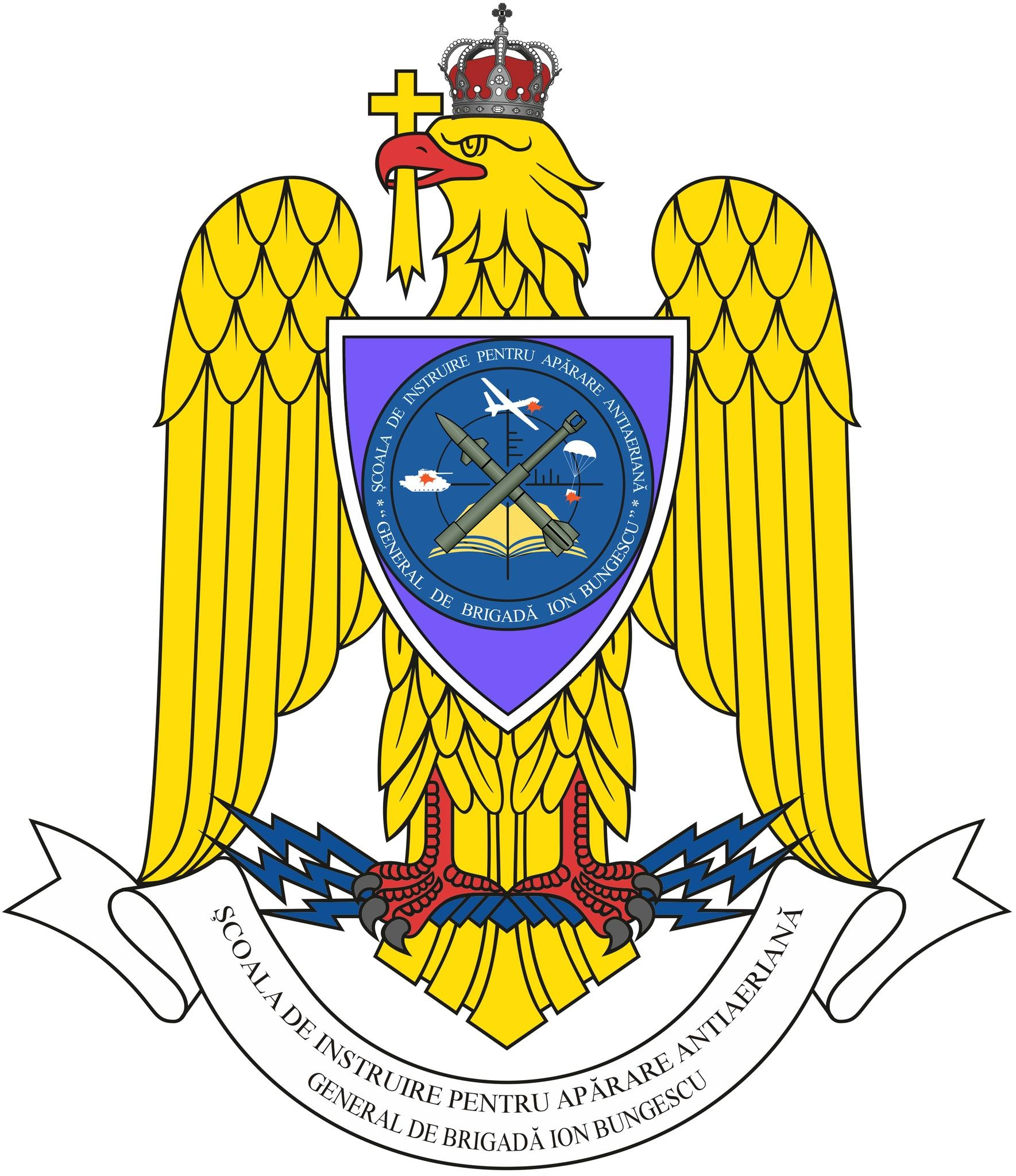
Air Defense Training School "General de brigadă Ion Bungescu"

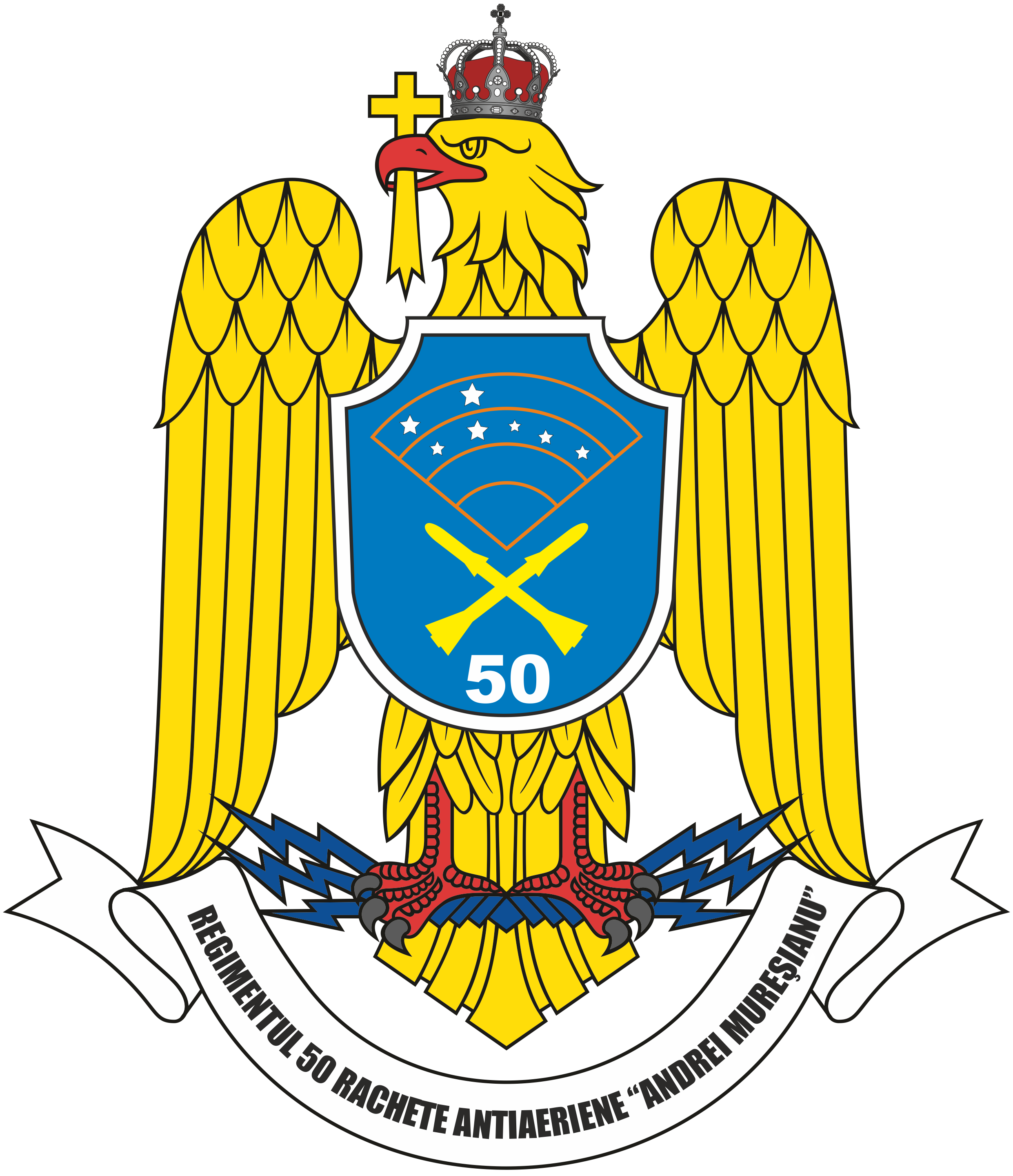
50th Anti-Aircraft Missile Regiment "Andrei Mureșianu"

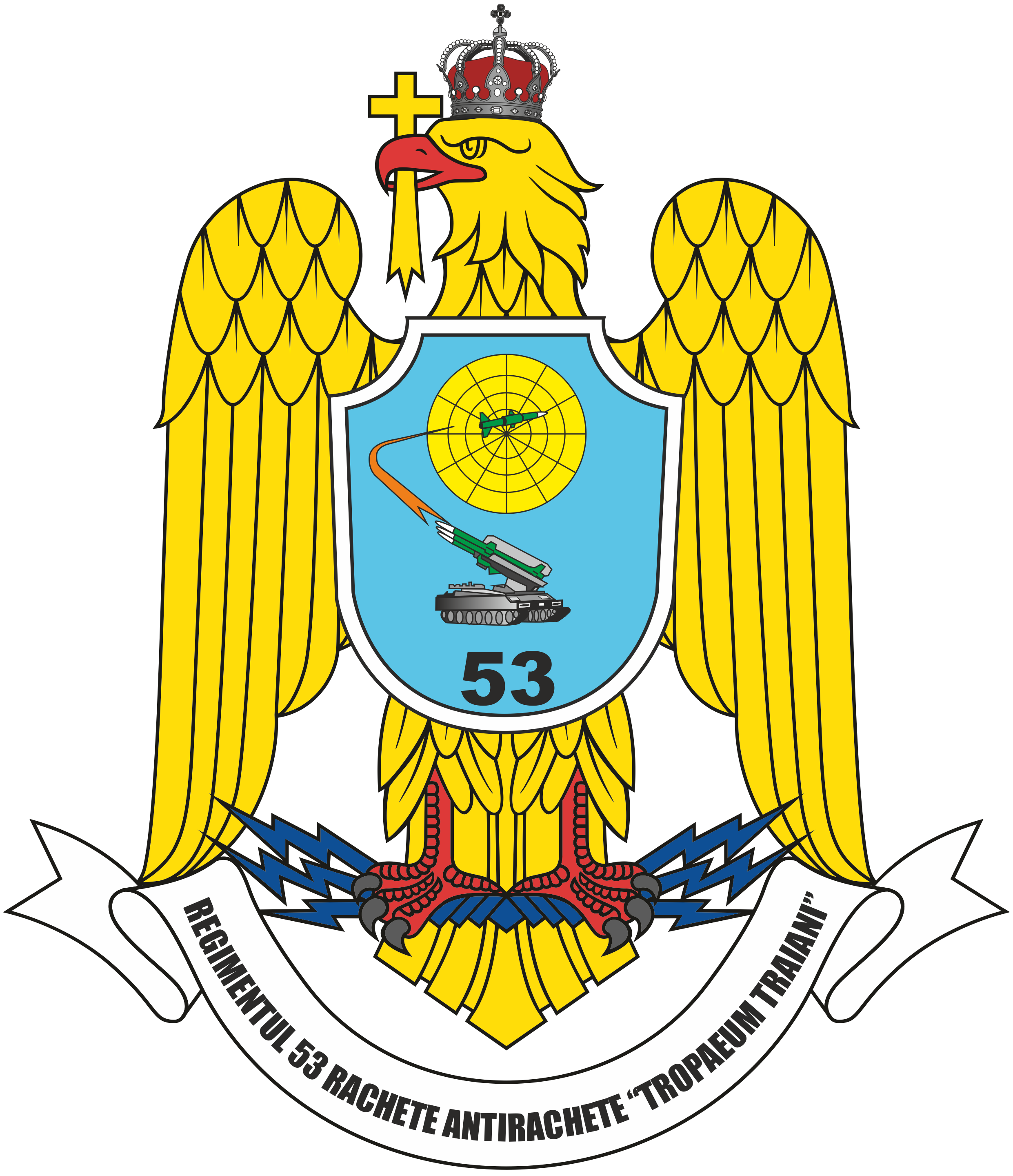
53rd Anti-Aircraft Missile Regiment "Trophaeum Traiani"

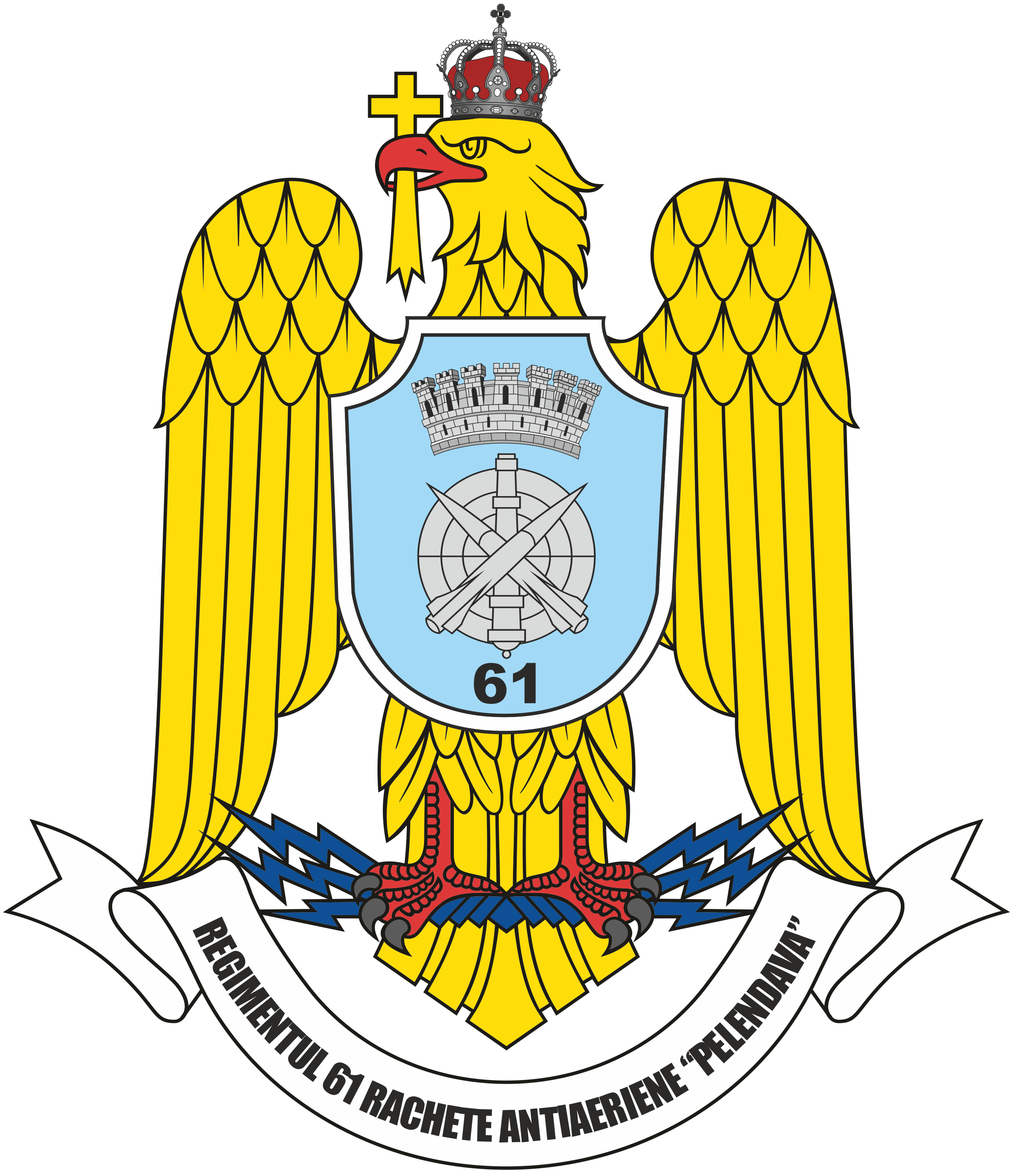
61st Anti-aircraft Missiles Regiment "Pelendava"

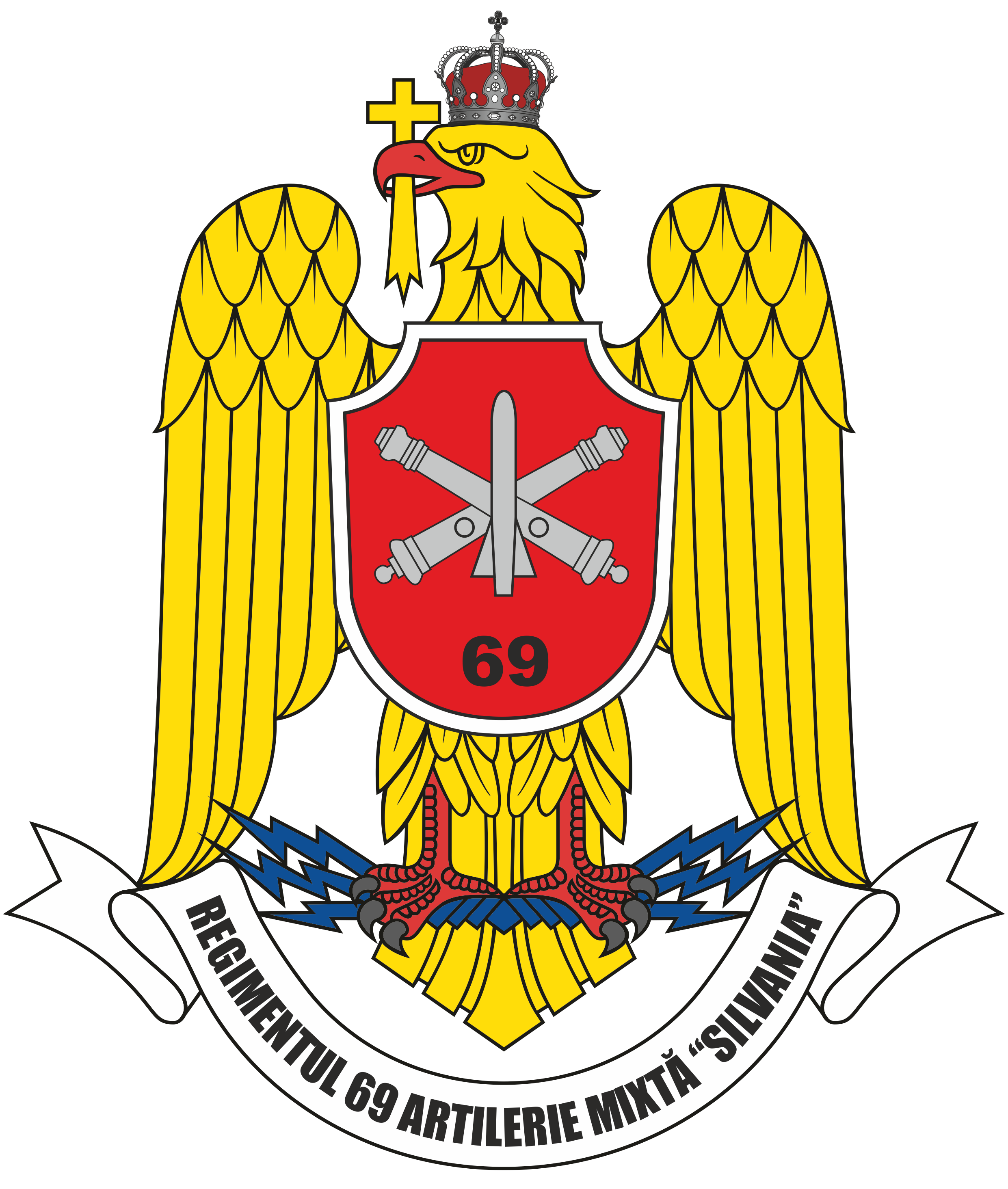
69th Artillery Regiment "Silvania"

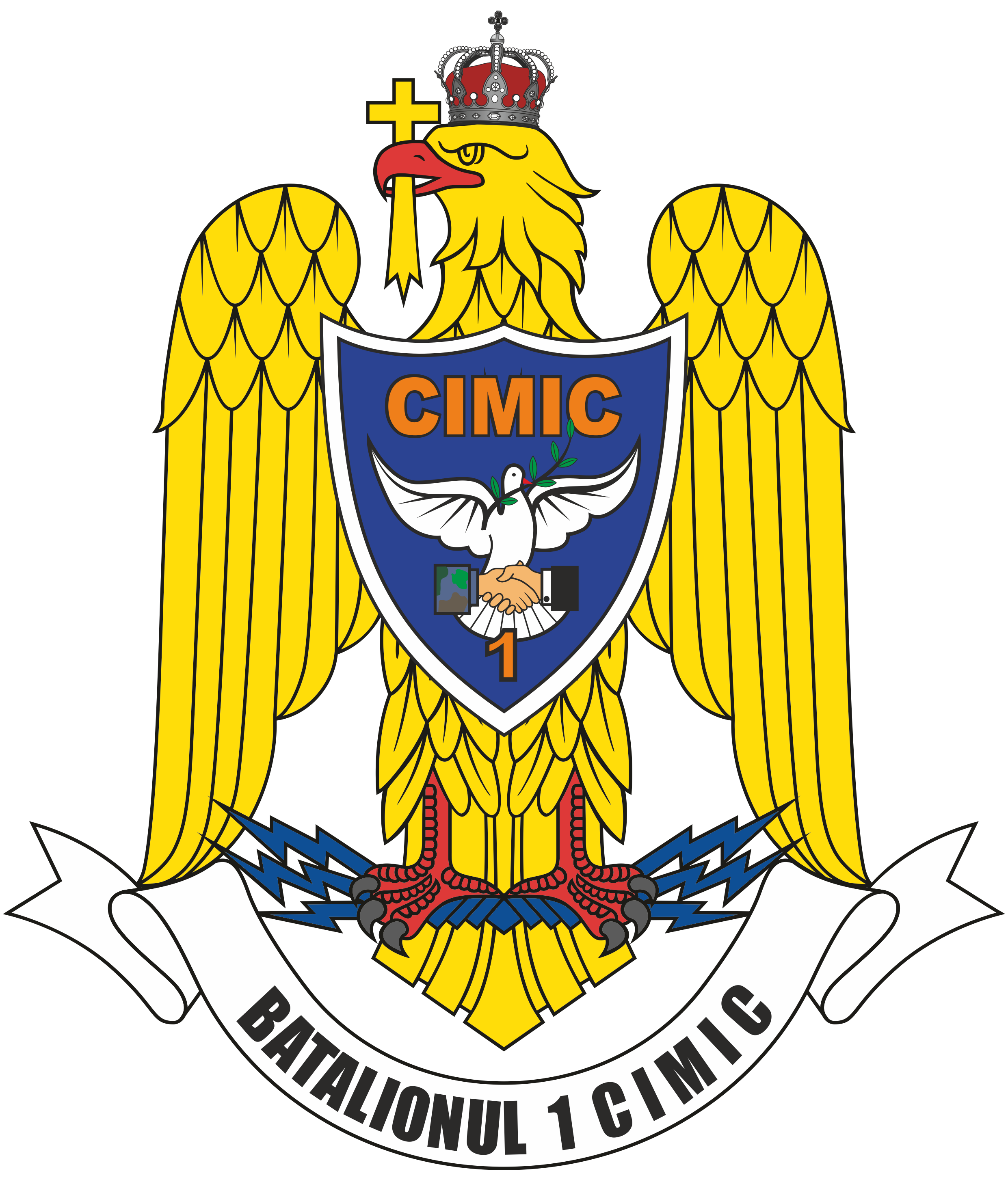
1st CIMIC Battalion

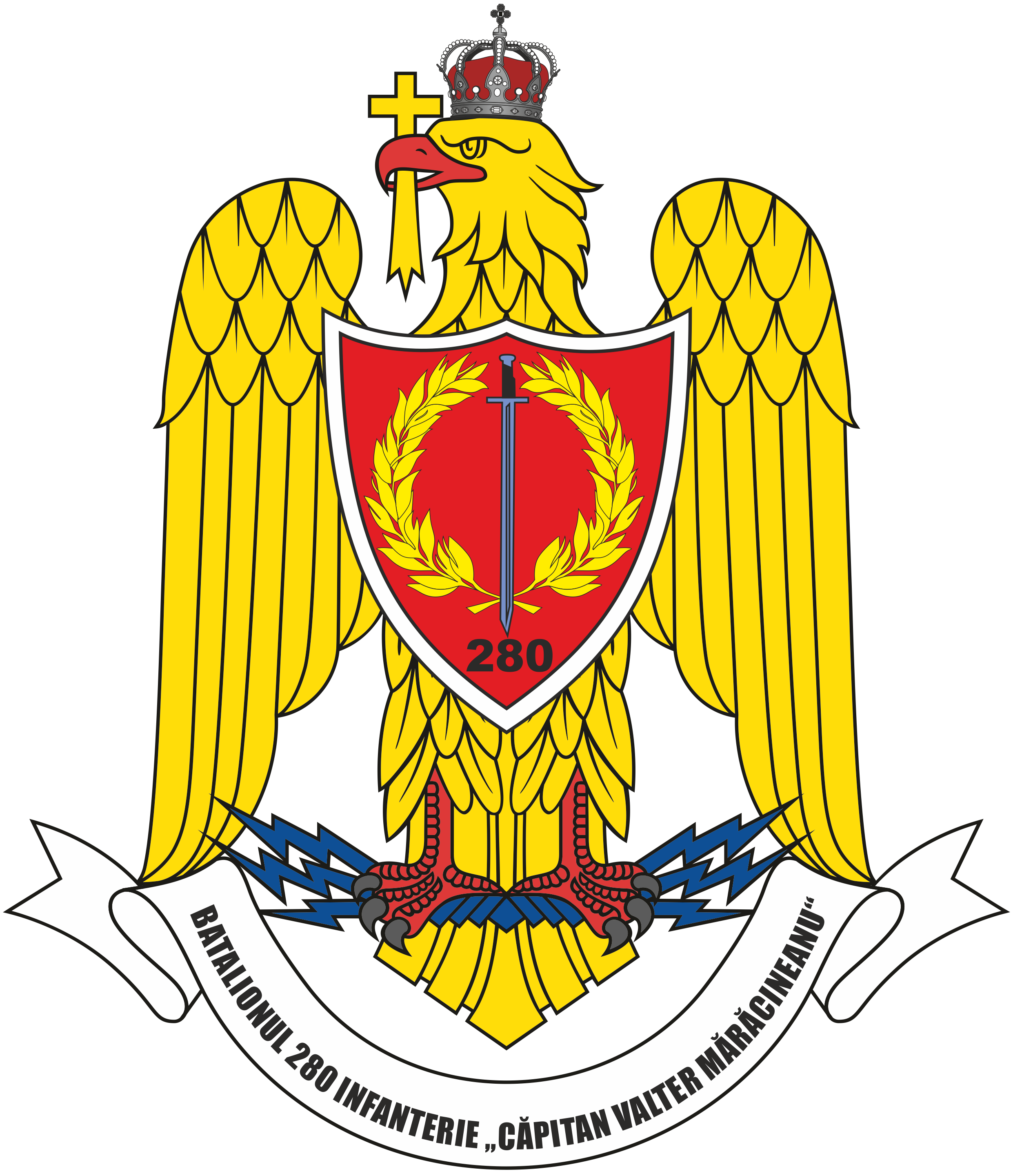
280th Mechanized Infantry Battalion "Căpitan Valter Mărăcineanu"

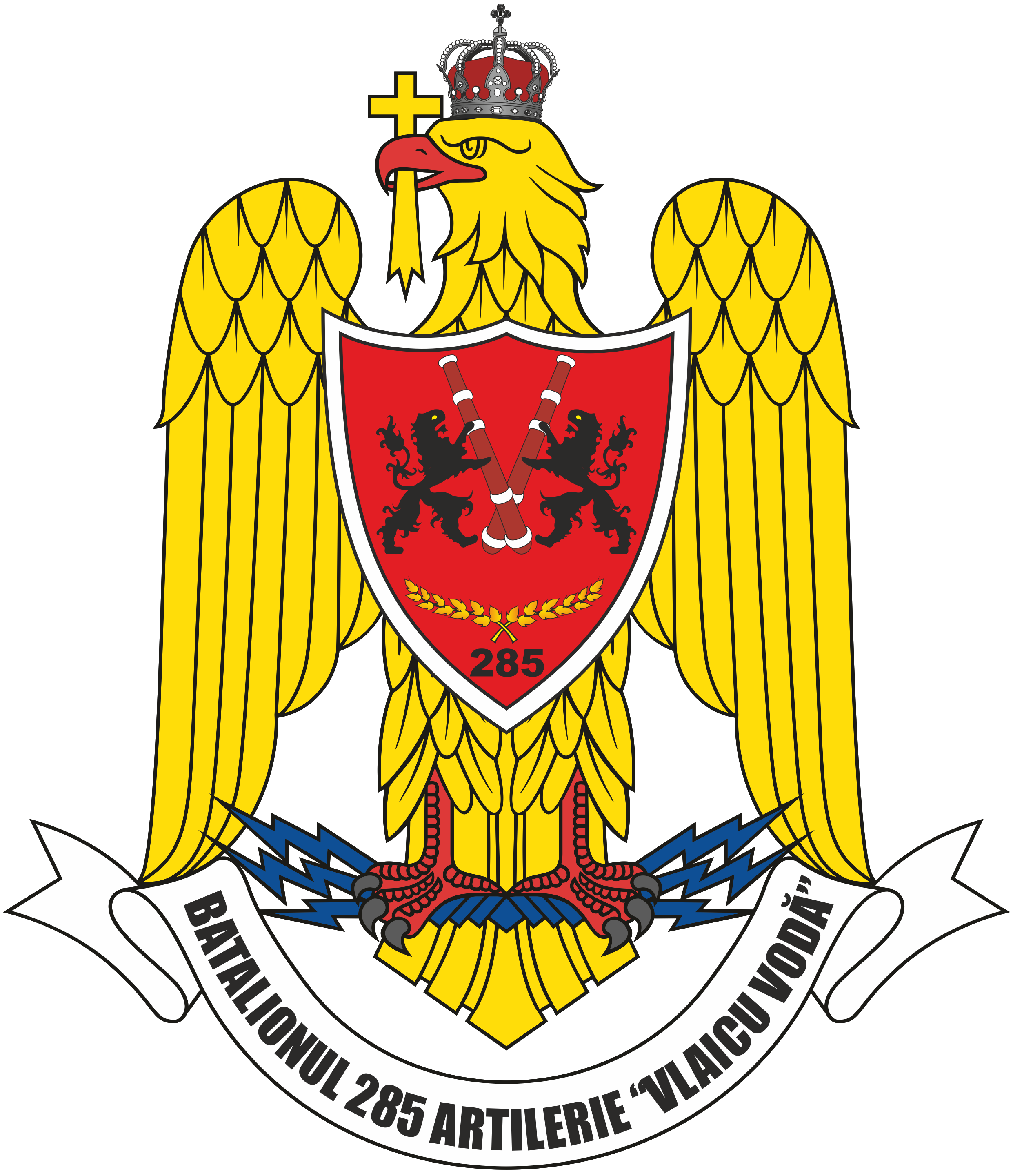
285th Artillery Battalion "Vlaicu Vodă"

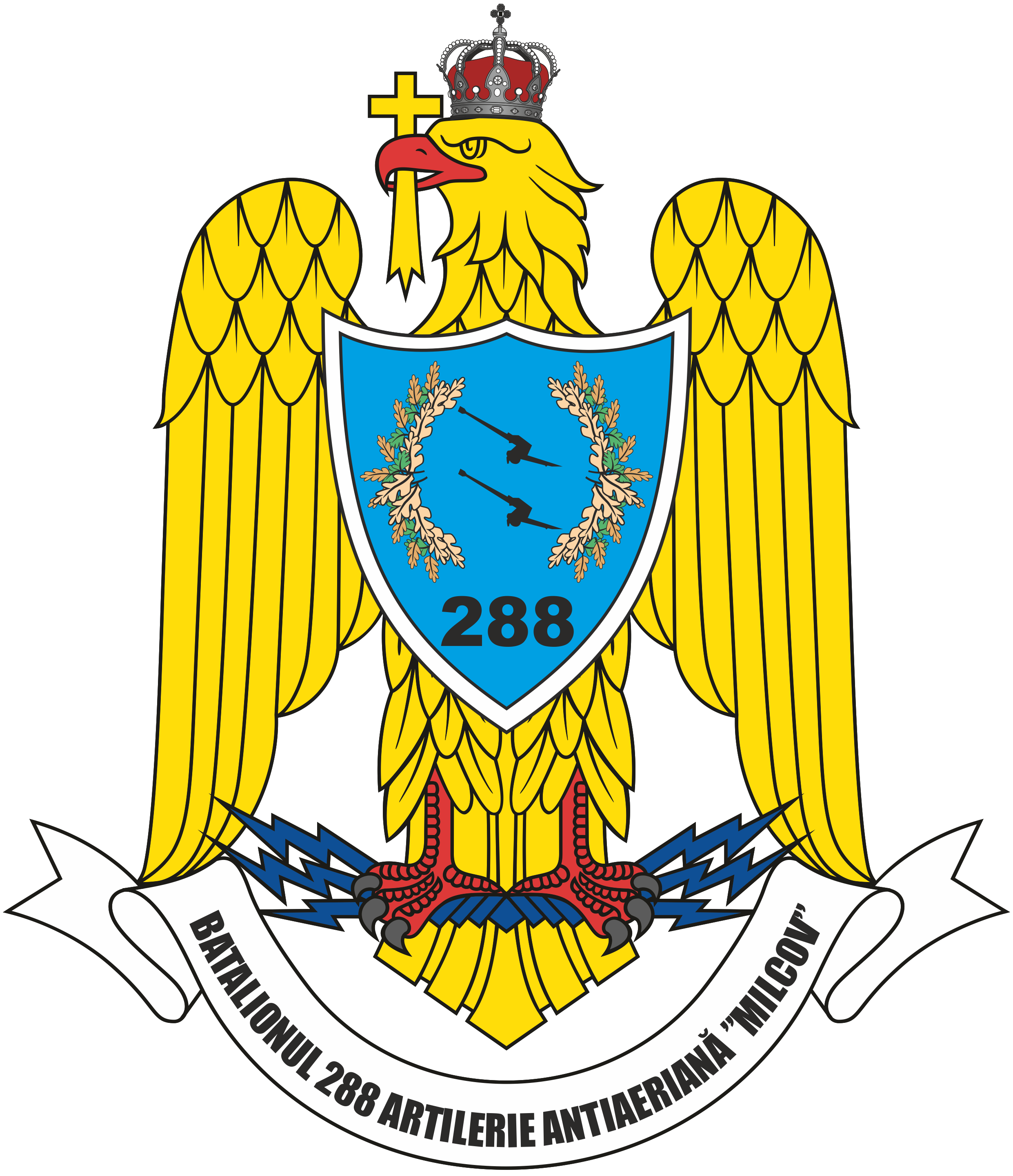
288th Anti-aircraft Artillery Battalion "Milcov"

82nd Anti-Tank Artillery Battalion "General Alexandru Tell" (old emblem)

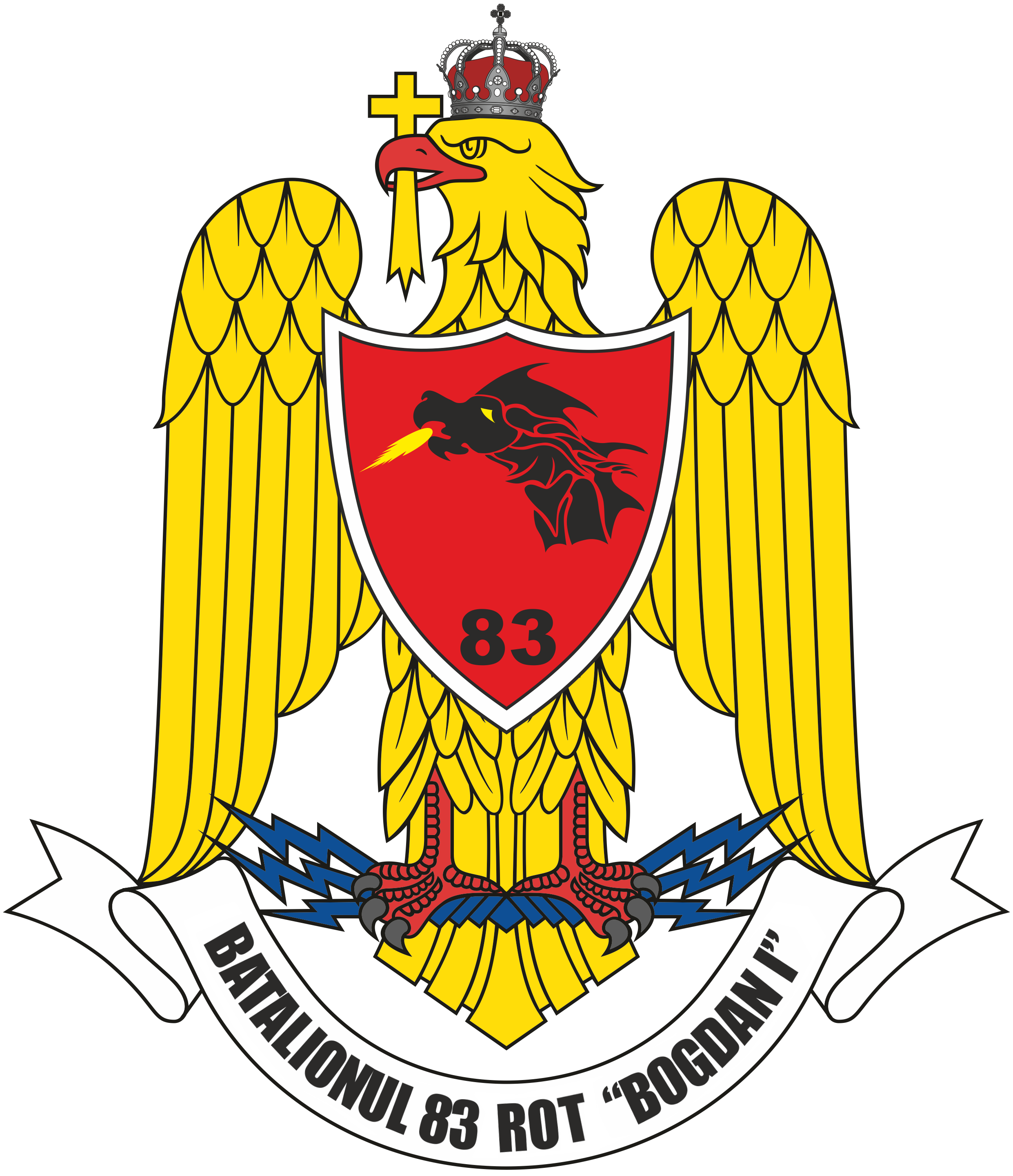
83rd Tactical Operational Missile Battalion "Bogdan I"

84th Support Battalion "Mărăști" (old emblem)

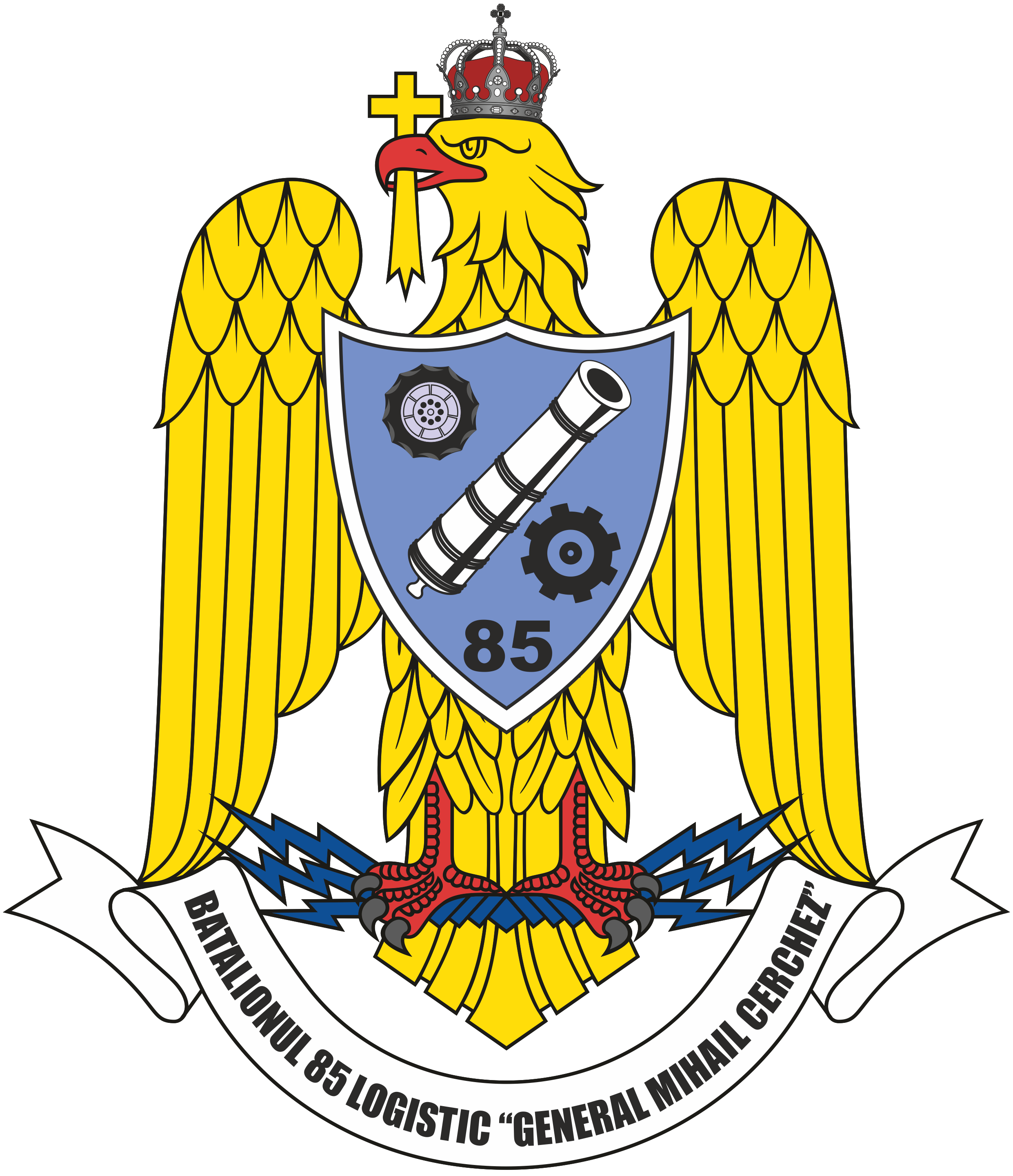
85th Logistics Battalion "General Mihail Cerchez"

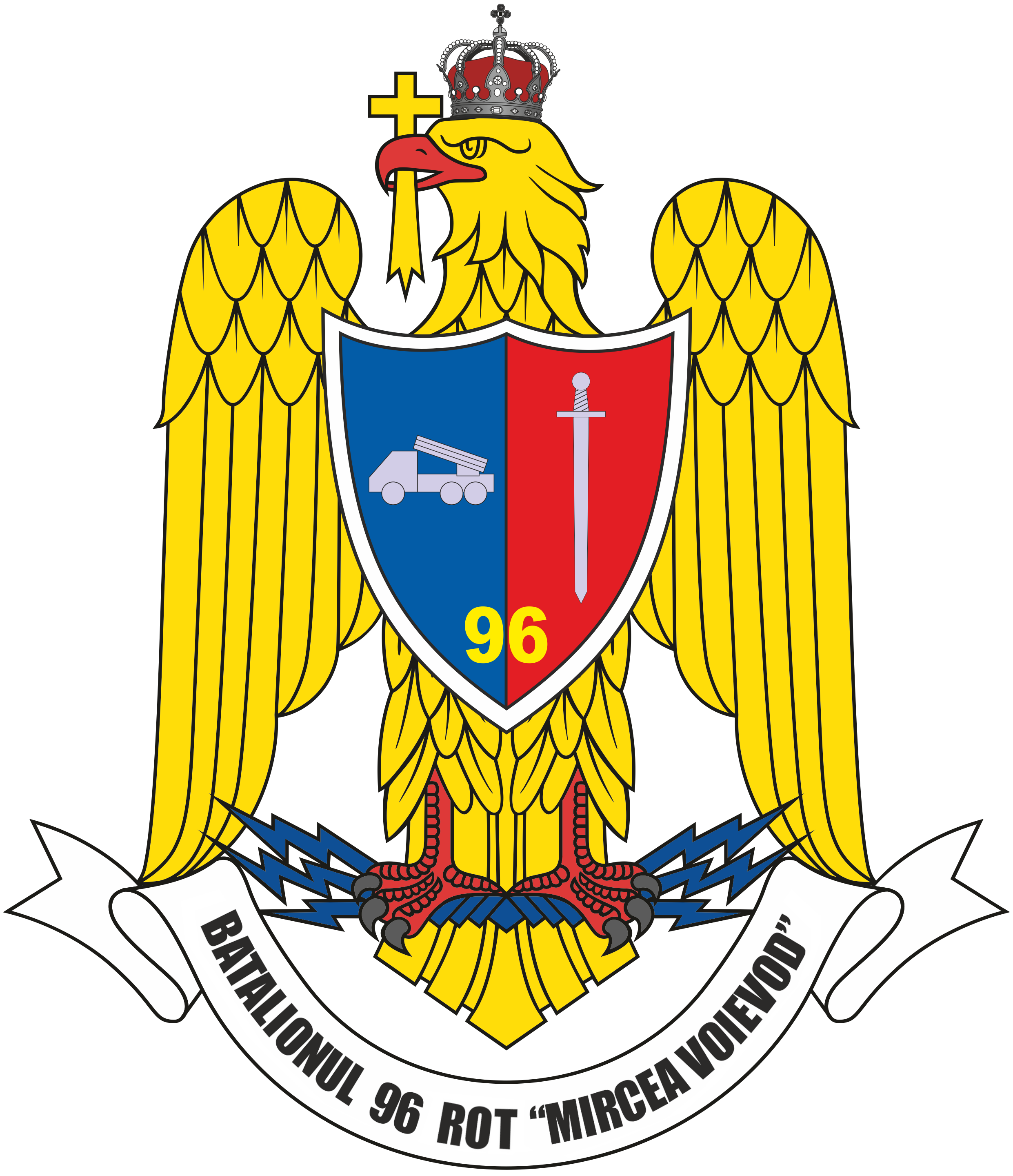
96th Tactical Operational Missile Battalion "Mircea Voievod"

== Other law enforcement authorities ==
=== Secret services ===
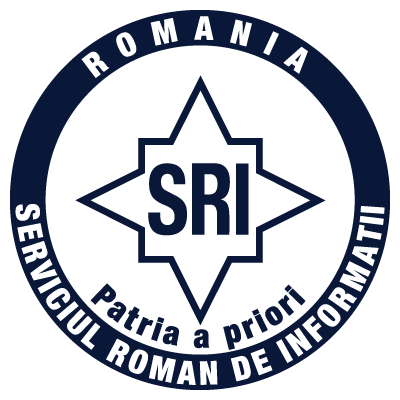
Romanian Intelligence Service

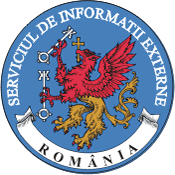
Foreign Intelligence Service

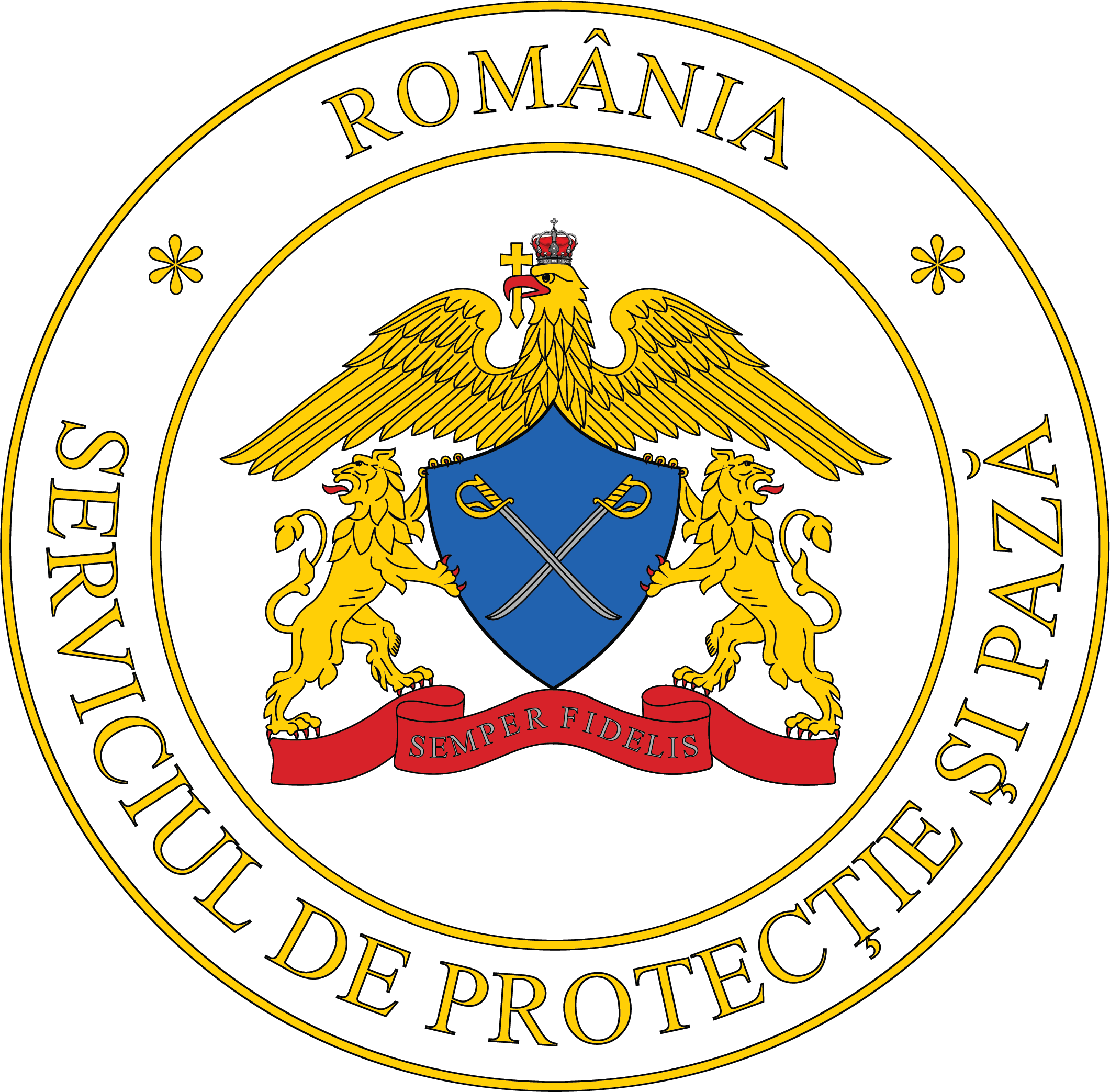
Protection and Guard Service

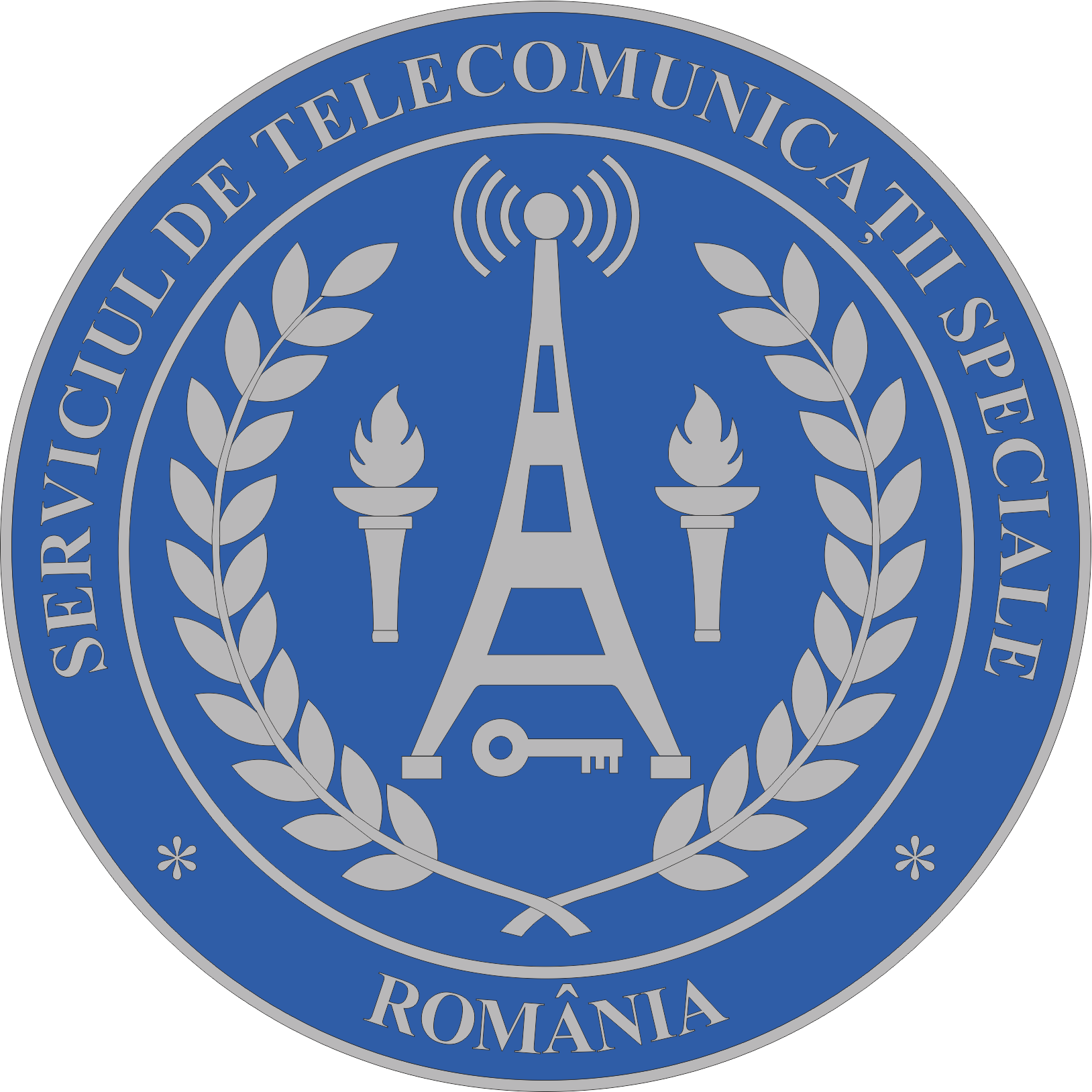
Special Telecommunication Service

=== Former coats of arms ===
Romanian Financial Guard (dissolved in 2013)

== See also ==
- Mottos of Romanian institutions
