= 2016 Haragîș helicopter crash =

Aviation incident in Moldova

Coordinates: 46.29196°N 28.37030°E

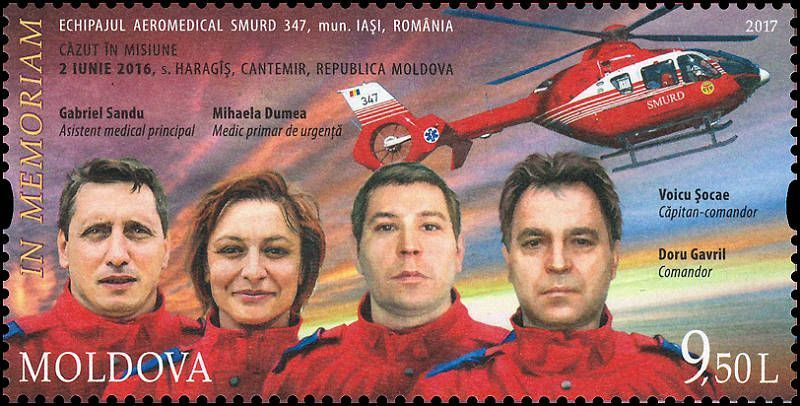
- A Moldovan stamp, issued in June 2017, commemorates the crash

Accident
- Date: 2 June 2016
- Summary: Crashed while in adverse weather conditions
- Site: near Haragîș, Cantemir District, Moldova

Aircraft
- Aircraft type: Eurocopter EC135
- Operator: SMURD
- Registration: 347
- Stopover: Chișinău, Moldova
- Destination: Cahul, Moldova
- Occupants: 4
- Crew: 4
- Fatalities: 4
- Survivors: 0

The Haragîș helicopter crash happened on June 2, 2016, when a Romanian helicopter belonging to the SMURD emergency rescue service crashed near the village of Haragîș in Cantemir District while performing a rescue mission in Moldova.

The helicopter had saved a life earlier that day by delivering a patient to Chișinău, then it refuelled and took off for the next patient, located in the southern city of Cahul. While en route to Cahul the aircraft crashed in Cantemir District due to poor weather conditions. All 4 crew members died:

- Adrian-Gabriel Sandu, nurse
- Mihaela Dumea, physician
- Constantin Voicu Șocae, copilot
- Ilie Doru Gavril, pilot

All of them were decorated post-mortem with high honors by the President of Romania Klaus Iohannis and the President of Moldova Nicolae Timofti. In June 2017, a commemorative stamp was issued in Moldova depicting the crew members and the helicopter.
