= Vehicle registration plates of Romania =

Romania/România
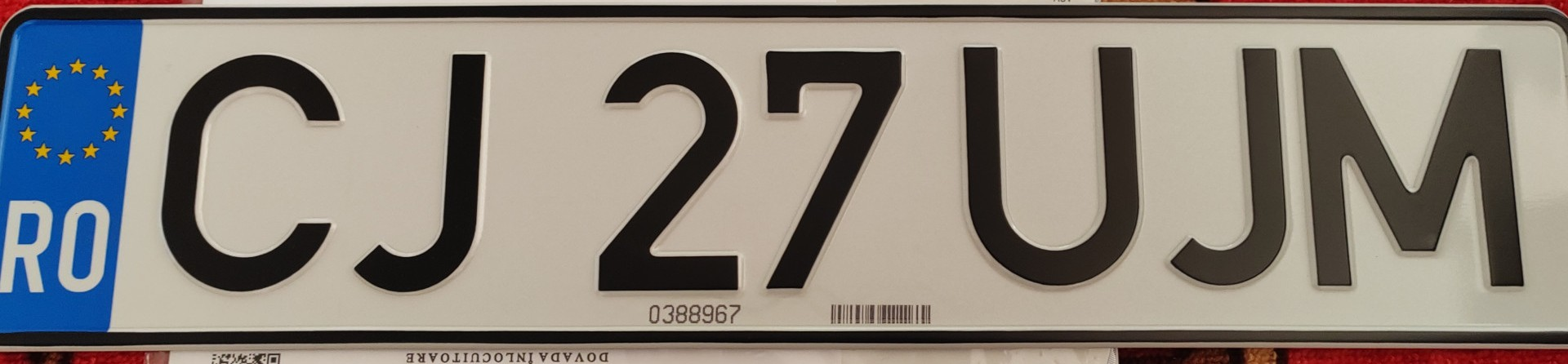
- Romanian license plate issued from Cluj county (2024-present).
- Country: Romania
- Country code: RO

Current series
- Slogan: None
- Size: 520 mm × 110 mm 20.5 in × 4.3 in
- Serial format: A(B) 123 CDE {A or AB being the regional code}
- Colour (rear): Black on white

European Union stripe, known as a "Euroband"(2007-present)

The most common format for vehicle registration plates in Romania consists of black letters on white background in the format CC 12 ABC, where CC is a two letter county code, 12 is a two digit group, and ABC is a three letter group. For Bucharest, the format is B 12 ABC or B 123 ABC, where B is code for Bucharest city, 12 and 123 is a two or three digit group, and ABC is a three letter group. The left side of the plate bears a blue vertical strip (the "Euroband") displaying the 12 stars of the European Union and the country code of Romania (RO). Between 1992 and 2007 the band featured the Romanian flag instead of the 12 stars. All lettering comes from the Latin alphabet.

The front plate usually carries a round label displaying the month and year when the technical inspection of the vehicle is due. These labels have different background colors depending on the year displayed. The label does not have a specific slot and can be placed anywhere, but the right side is preferred and plates usually come with a slot for them.

== Regulations ==
License plates are mandatory on both the front and rear of vehicles (only on the rear for motorcycles).

It is mandatory for the paint on all plates to be reflective, and they must be kept clean and fully visible at all times.

=== Assignment rules ===
The plates are issued for each car and for each owner, and they must be returned when the car is either sold or scrapped, although the new buyer is entitled to request continued use of the old license plate.

The digits and letters for the standard license plates are usually assigned at random, unless a customization fee is paid. Customizing is limited to picking the digits and the 3 capital letters at the end, provided the chosen combination is not already assigned.

The letter Q is not used as it may be confused with the letter O. The three-letter code may not start with I or O, as they can be mistaken for 1 or 0. (Until 1999, I and O were not used at all). Also, combinations like III or OOO are not allowed.

Several letter groups have been reserved for special use and may not be assigned to regular cars. These include POL (Romanian Police), DEP (Chamber of Deputies), SNT (Romanian Senate), SRI (Romanian Intelligence Service), GUV (Romanian Government).

It is common for companies or organizations with large car fleets to use the same letter combination on all their cars. Such combinations are done only as a convenience; they are not reserved, are assigned only while numbers last, and can additionally be explicitly requested by anybody, regardless of affiliation to that company or organization.

Letter combinations that may form obscene words in the Romanian language are denied licensing, but may still be in use if they were issued before the combination was blocked.

Combinations which the public has consistently refused to use, such as JEG (clunker, wreck of a car) or BOU (insult with the meaning of "dumb") are not included in the random assignment pool, but may still be explicitly requested.

=== Size and font ===
There are four standard sizes for license plates:

- A (520 x 110 mm) is the most widely used type and is mandatory for the front on any type of car.
- B (340 x 200 mm) is a narrow type used on the back of certain types of cars, such as SUVs.
- C (240 x 130 mm) is used exclusively by motorcycles.
- D (150 x 300 mm) is used only for the rear of vehicles of categories M (passenger transport) and N (goods transport), as well as category O (trailers).

The font used for the main part of the plate is DIN 1451 Mittelschrift, while the RO country code on the Euroband uses DIN 1451 Engschrift.

=== Legislation ===
In Romania, vehicle license plates are issued based on:

- Article 19 from O.U.G. 195 from 12 December 2002 regarding traffic on public roads
- Order of Minister of Internal Affairs and Administration nr. 1501 from 13 November 2006, regarding the procedure of vehicle licensing, registering, striking out and issuing of provisional or running licenses.
- Romanian Standard SR 13078:1996 "Road vehicles. Retro-reflective registration plates for motor vehicles and trailers" with five updates.
- Romanian Standard SR 13140:1996 "Road vehicles. Content and structure of registration provisional and running test numbers to be relief embossed on retro-reflective registration plates" with three updates.

=== Second series of license plates (2024-present) ===
Starting from September 2024, a new series of license plate numbers has been issued in Romania, marking the second modification of the plate format since its initial adoption in 1992 and the previous update in 2007. These are not major changes; they mainly consist of new graphic and extra security elements designed to discourage potential counterfeiting of license plates, as well as to enhance European standards for license plates inside the European Union.

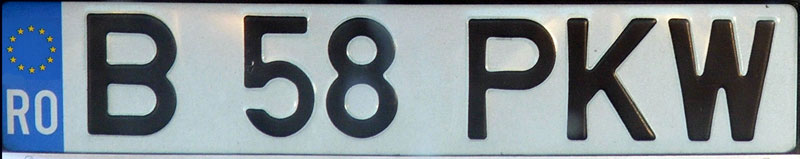
Romanian license plate issued from 2007 to 2024.

Differences compared to the previously issued series of license plates (2007-2024):

- A unique personal identification code has now been added to each plate. Each plate comes with a completely random, distinct code following an increasing order. Previously, this code was visible only on the rear side of the plate. On the new plates, this code is located on the left side, under the first digit of the license plate number (see the attached photo).
- The newly issued plates feature a new security element: a barcode located below the second digit and, in some cases, extending even under the first letter of the license plate number. This code can be scanned by authorized public services (R.A.R.), police, surveillance cameras and so on. Once scanned, it automatically displays technical data about the vehicle as well as information about its owner, such as name, address, city, and county of origin (see the attached photo).
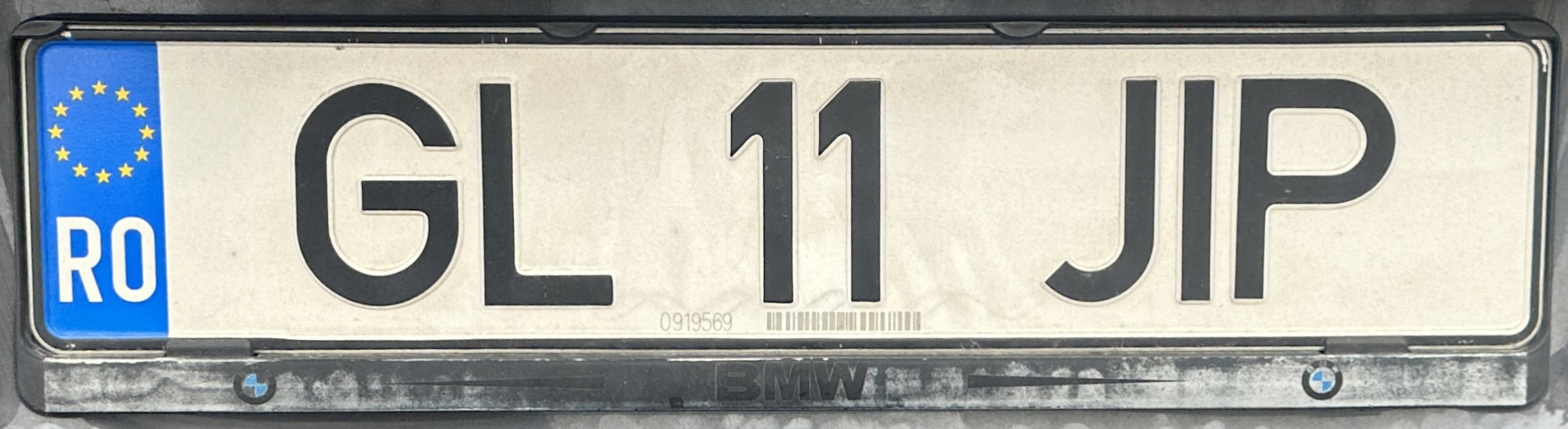
  Phosphorescent hologram featuring the Romanian coat of arms (2024-present) New series of Romanian license plates issued after September 2024 from Galați County.
- As an additional anti-counterfeiting measure, phosphorescent holograms featuring the Romanian coat of arms are now placed along the entire license plate number, visible in daylight or under any light conditions, especially at night. In previous versions, holograms were similar but not easily visible, and instead of the Romanian state coat of arms, only the "RO" code holograms was present.

== Possible combinations ==
Given that Q cannot be used at all, and that all letter combinations starting with O or I are forbidden in order to avoid confusion, there are roughly 23 x 25 x 25 = 14,375 letter combinations (but keep in mind that a couple of dozen specific combinations have been eliminated from the public pool for various reasons). Multiplying with the 99 numbers in the original scheme (00 is not a valid number) gives 1,423,125 possible combination for each of the 42 counties.

While the total 59,771,250 number of combinations is far in excess (about an order of magnitude greater) than the actual number of vehicles registered in the entirety of Romania, this does not take into account the particularities of specific counties.

Indeed, during 2010 it was estimated that the pool of combinations for Bucharest would run out during the year, a situation created by the city's unusually large vehicle pool when compared to other cities and even entire counties.

This has led to expanding the number code for Bucharest to 3 digits, raising the city's pool to 2,860,625 and the total number of combinations overall to 61,208,750.

== Other license plate formats ==
There are several other types of license plates currently in use in Romania in addition to the standard format.

=== Short-term temporary plates ===
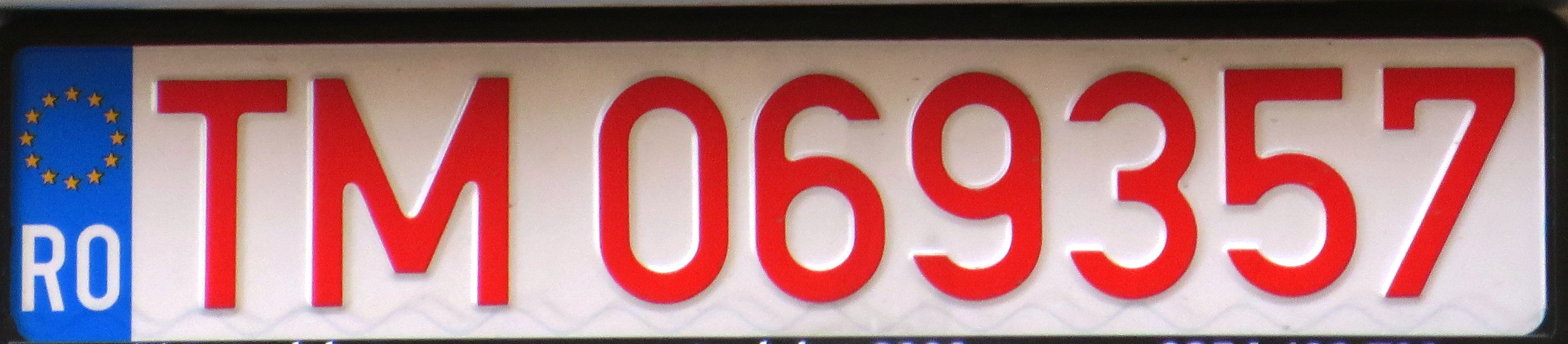
Red plate from Timiș County

Colloquially referred to as red numbers, the short-term temporary plates consist of the European strip, followed by the county code and three to six digits, of which the first is always zero and the second is always non-zero. All the writing outside of the European-strip on this plate is in red font.

These plates are valid for a maximum of 30 days and they can be re-issued for a cumulative continuous period of no more than 90 days.

These plates can be used for any vehicle regardless of its technical road-worthy state and have been specially designed as a fallback for any case where it would be impractical or impossible for a vehicle to be issued regular plates.

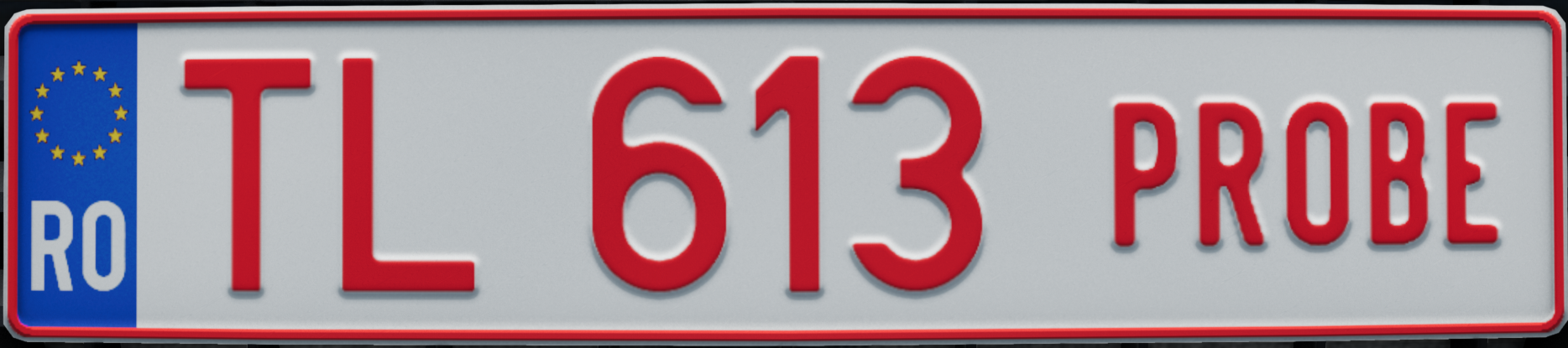
Test vehicle plate from Tulcea County

They tend to be most often used by car leasing and rental companies for their new cars, or cars used as temporary replacement while the owner's car is being repaired.

There is a variation of this format used for test vehicles, having 3 digits following the county code, and the inscription "PROBE" (trials) after the digits. The smallest number used in this case is 101.

=== Long-term temporary plates ===
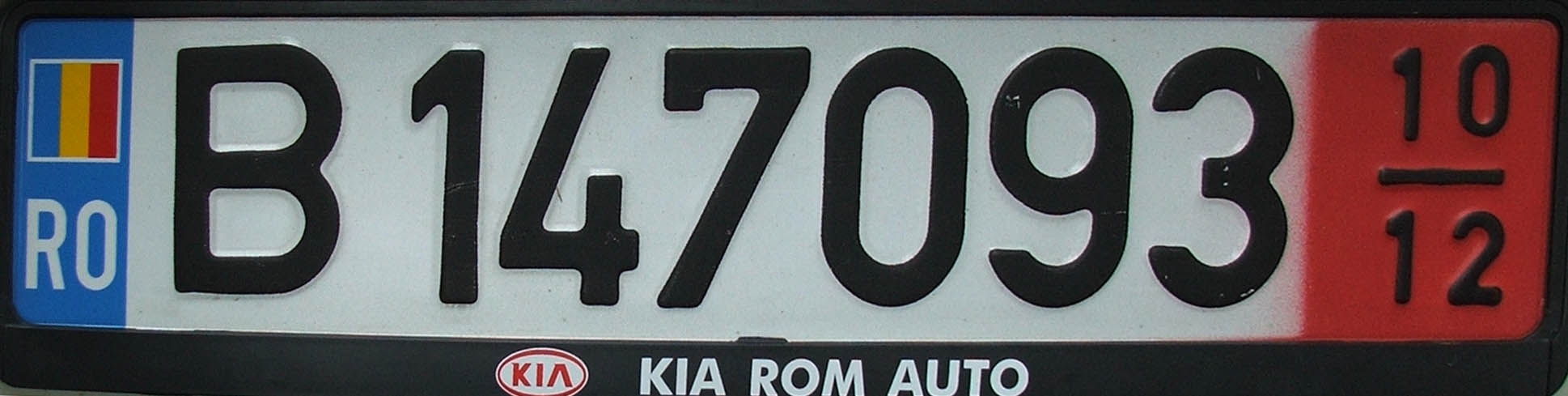
Temporary plate from Bucharest (1992-2007)

The long-term temporary plates are similar to the short-term plates but use a black inscription instead of red and the number never starts with zero. Additionally, on the right side there is a red strip containing the end date of the plate's validity in YY/MM format.

This kind of plate is used most often for foreign nationals who take temporary residence in Romania, and for cars that fall under a leasing agreement.

=== Plates for electric vehicles ===
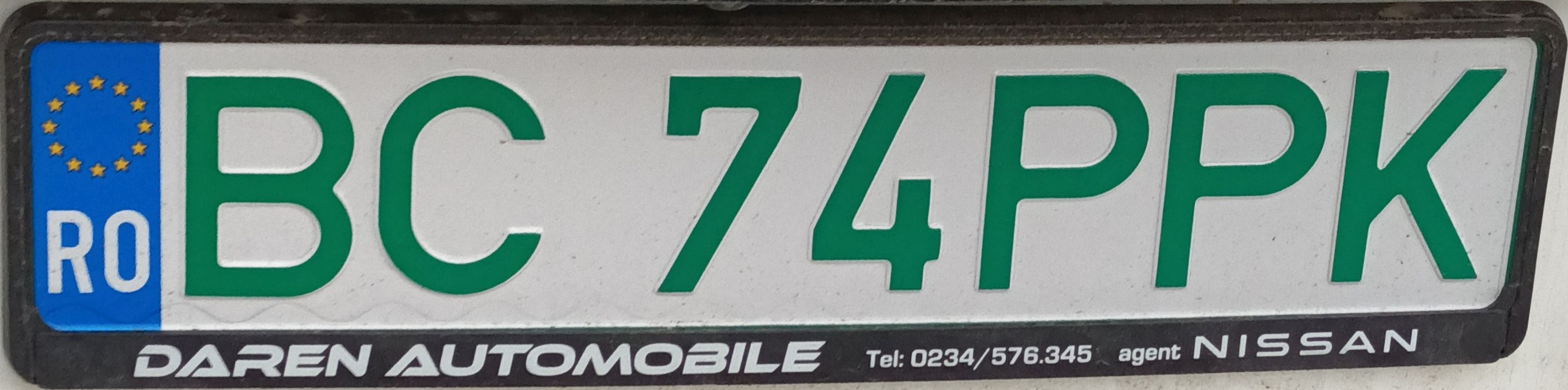
Green plate from Bacău County

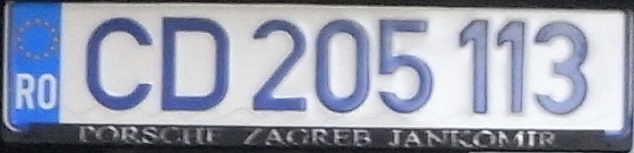
Diplomatic plate

Most commonly known as "green plates", they are similar to the standard format, but use a green inscription instead of black. This kind of plate is meant solely for electric vehicles (EVs), distinguishing them from those vehicles relying on gasoline or diesel.

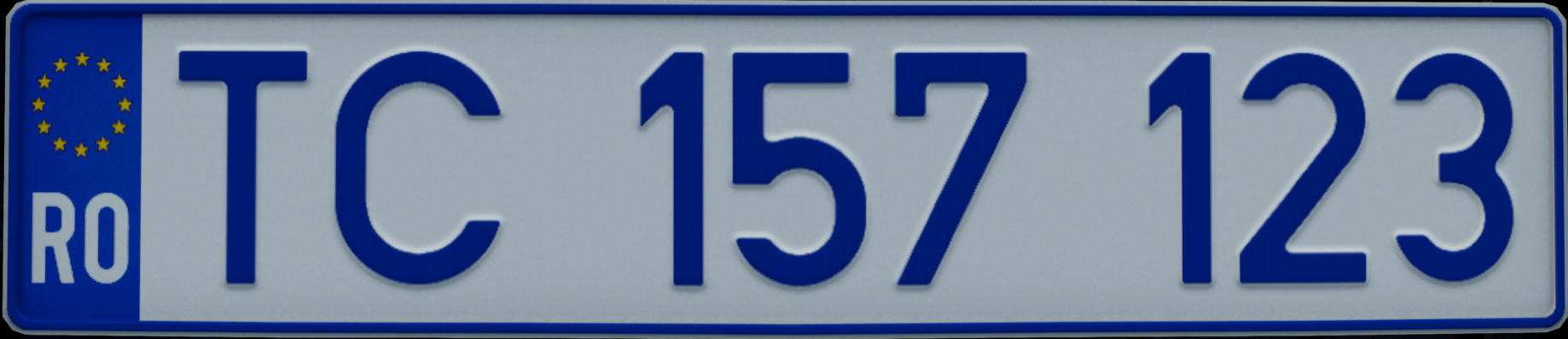
Consular Transport plate

=== Diplomatic plates ===
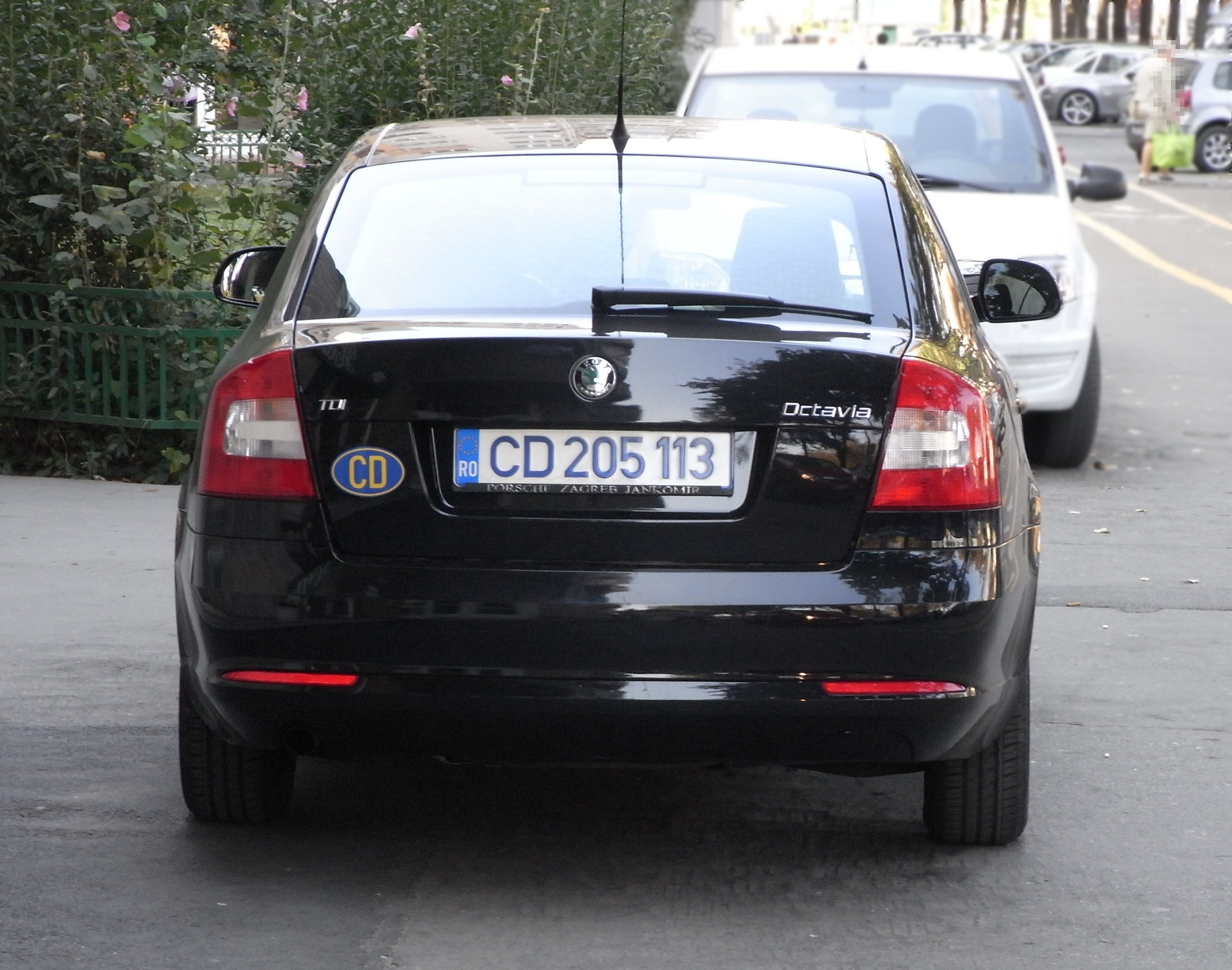
Car with diplomatic plates

The diplomatic plate contains the European strip followed by blue text. The text consists of a code which can be CD (Diplomatic Corps), TC (Consular Transport), or CO (Consulate), followed by 6 digits.

The first three digits stand for the country or international organization, the last three usually for the rank of the owner. The lowest number for both sets of 3 is 101. Thus, a car with license plate number 123 101 would refer to Switzerland's (123) ambassador (ambassadors and heads of mission are usually assigned code 101).

CD license plates are issued exclusively to diplomats, and cars having such plates benefit from diplomatic immunity. However TC licence plates are issued to foreign NATO officers based in Romania and other organisations in addition to Consulates. Initially, the countries or organizations received codes in their alphabetical order, but some countries, such as United States or Russia, have received more than one code because they have surpassed 899 registered cars.

Table of codes (incomplete):

| Code | Country |
|---|---|
| 101 | Afghanistan |
| 102 | Albania |
| 103 | Algeria |
| 104 | Argentina |
| 105 | Austria |
| 106 | Belgium |
| 107 | Brazil |
| 108 | Bulgaria |
| 109 | Cambodia |
| 110 | Canada |
| 111 | Czech Republic |
| 112 | Chile |
| 113 | China |
| 114 | Cyprus |
| 115 | Democratic Republic of the Congo |
| 116 | South Korea |
| 122 | Egypt |
| 123 | Switzerland |
| 124 | Ethiopia |
| 125 | Finland |
| 126 | France |
| 127 | Germany |
| 128 | Greece |
| 130 | India |
| 131 | Indonesia |
| 132 | Jordan |
| 134 | Iran |
| 136 | Italy |
| 138 | Japan |
| 141 | Libya |
| 142 | Malaysia |
| 146 | Moldova |
| 150 | Netherlands |
| 152 | Pakistan |
| 154 | Poland |
| 155 | Portugal |
| 156 | Russia |
| 157 | United States |
| 159 | Syria |
| 165 | Tunisia |
| 166 | Turkey |
| 167 | Ukraine |
| 168 | Hungary |
| 170 | Venezuela |
| 183 | United Nations |
| 188 | Armenia |
| 189 | Belarus |
| 191 | Peru |
| 193 | Qatar |
| 205 | Croatia |
| 206 | Azerbaijan |
| 207 | United Kingdom |
| 210 | Saudi Arabia |
| 211 | United States |
| 216 | Georgia |
| 217 | United Arab Emirates |
| 220 | Kuwait |
| 222 | Armenia |
| 223 | Slovenia |
| 226 | Turkmenistan |
| 231 | Burundi |
| 233 | Hungary |
| 234 | Estonia |

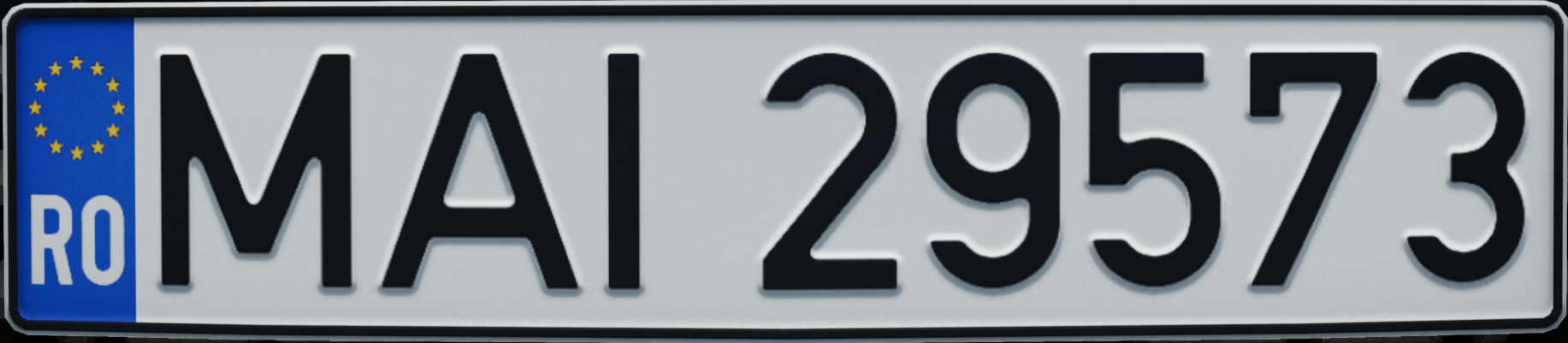
MAI plate

=== Plates for special organizations ===
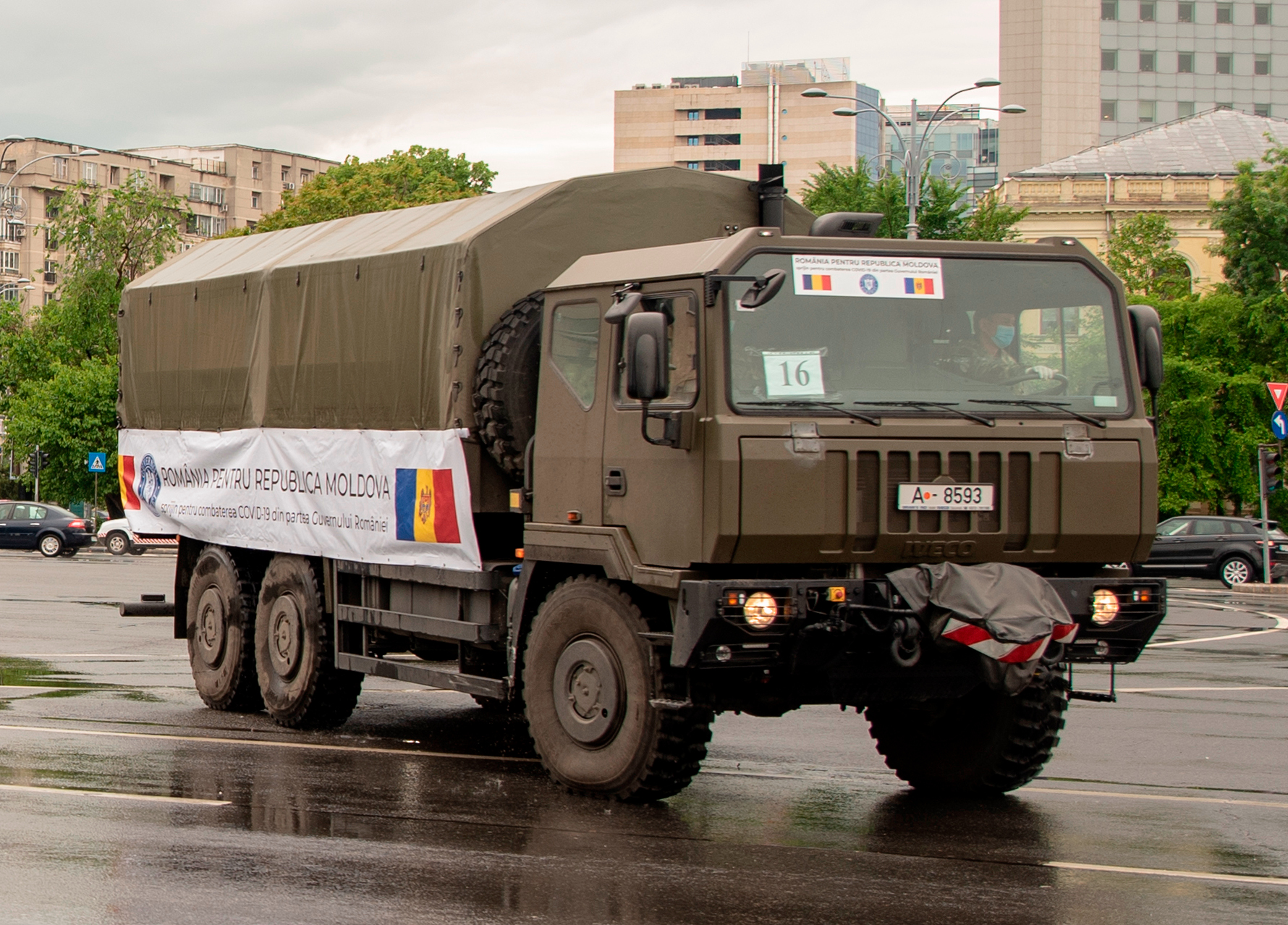
Romanian Army truck

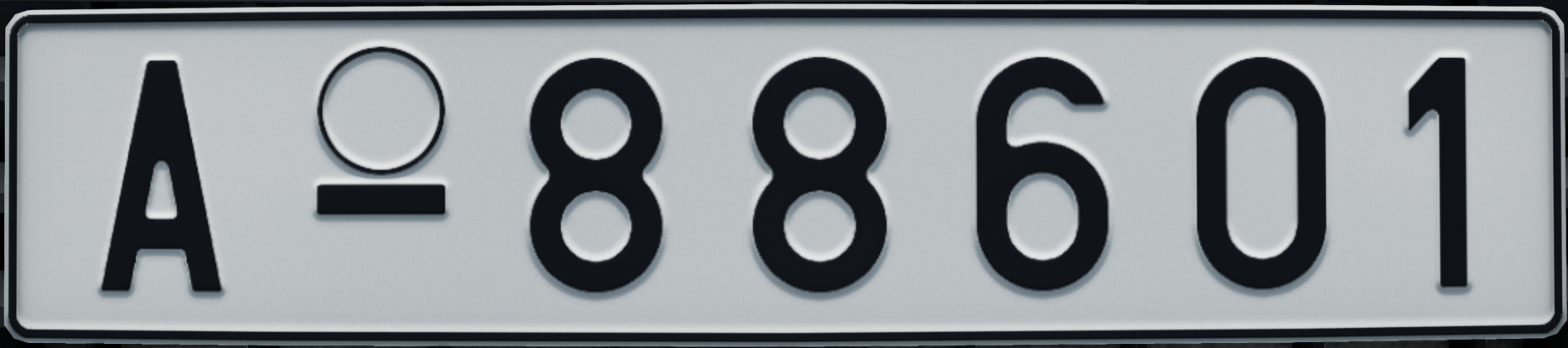
Romanian Army plate

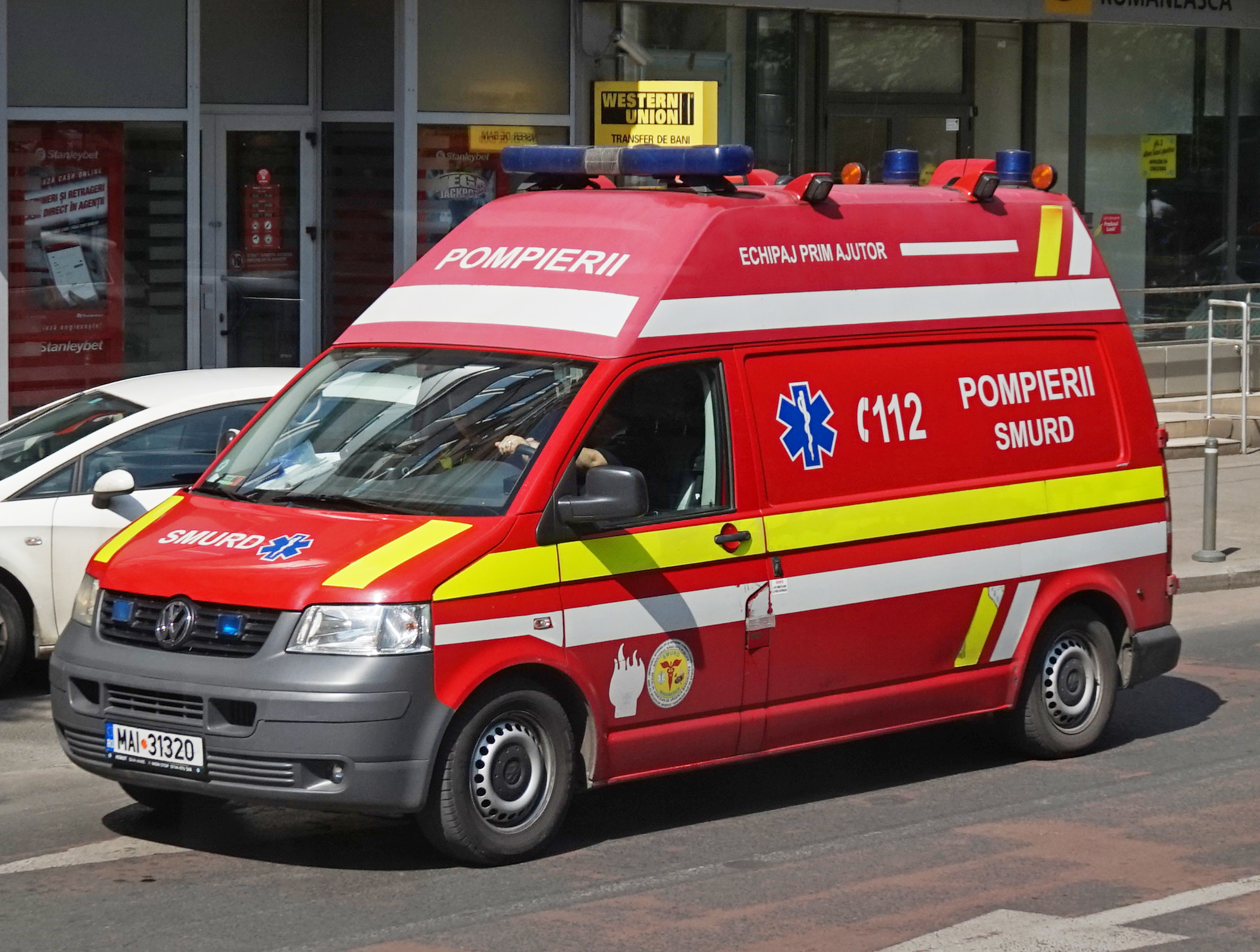
SMURD ambulance with MAI plates

The Romanian Armed Forces and the Ministry of Internal Affairs are allowed to issue plates in a special format which does not fall under normal regulations.

The format, size and style is decided by each such organization via internal regulations and may not resemble other types of plates.

The Armed Forces use plates without the European strip (as their regulations predate the 1992 regulation imposing it), with the letter "A" (Armată, military) followed by 3 to 7 digits. Military plates issued more recently (from 2002 onwards) may include the European strip.

Ministry of Interior plates start with "MAI" and are typically seen on cars belonging to the Gendarmerie, Romanian Police, emergency response units, and some SMURD ambulances.

MAI plates are not issued to cars used by local police employed by town hall, which use regular plates instead.

=== Local administration plates ===
Yellow background plates are issued by the local authorities such as town hall, municipalities, village or commune mayoralties for the registration of certain light vehicles, or other types of vehicles that do not need country-wide authorization, such as public utility vehicles, some light garbage trucks, lawn mowers, small sanitation vehicles, mass-transit vehicles tethered to local infrastructure, quad bikes, scooters, golf carts

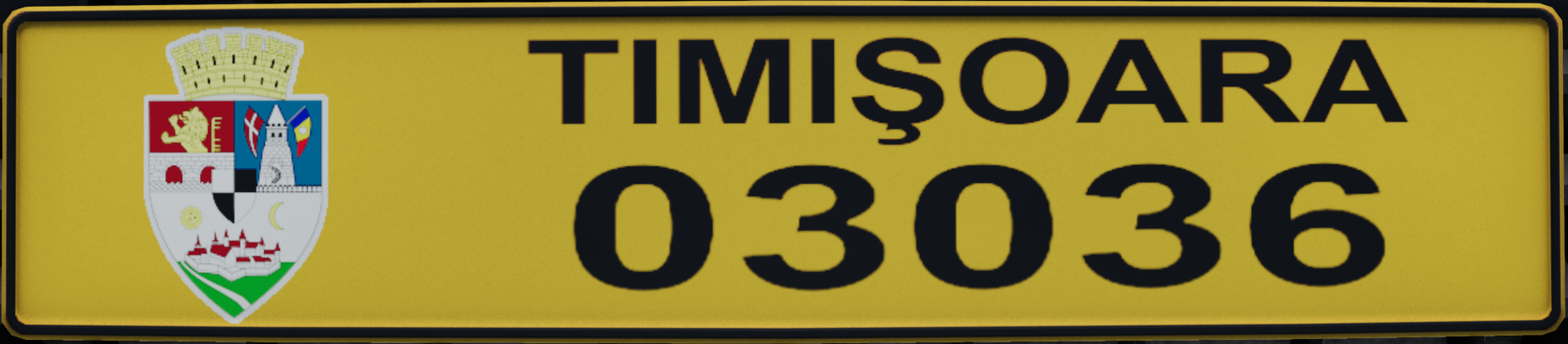
Yellow local administration license plate for Timișoara

and non-road going agricultural vehicles, such as combine harvesters, non-road-going tractors, or horse-drawn carts.

The format of the plate is not standardized across all administrations. Most local authorities used a yellow plate, but there are exceptions like Cluj-Napoca, which used white plate similar to old German plates, but always bearing the letters CJ-N (from the city name's abbreviation), followed by 3 digits.

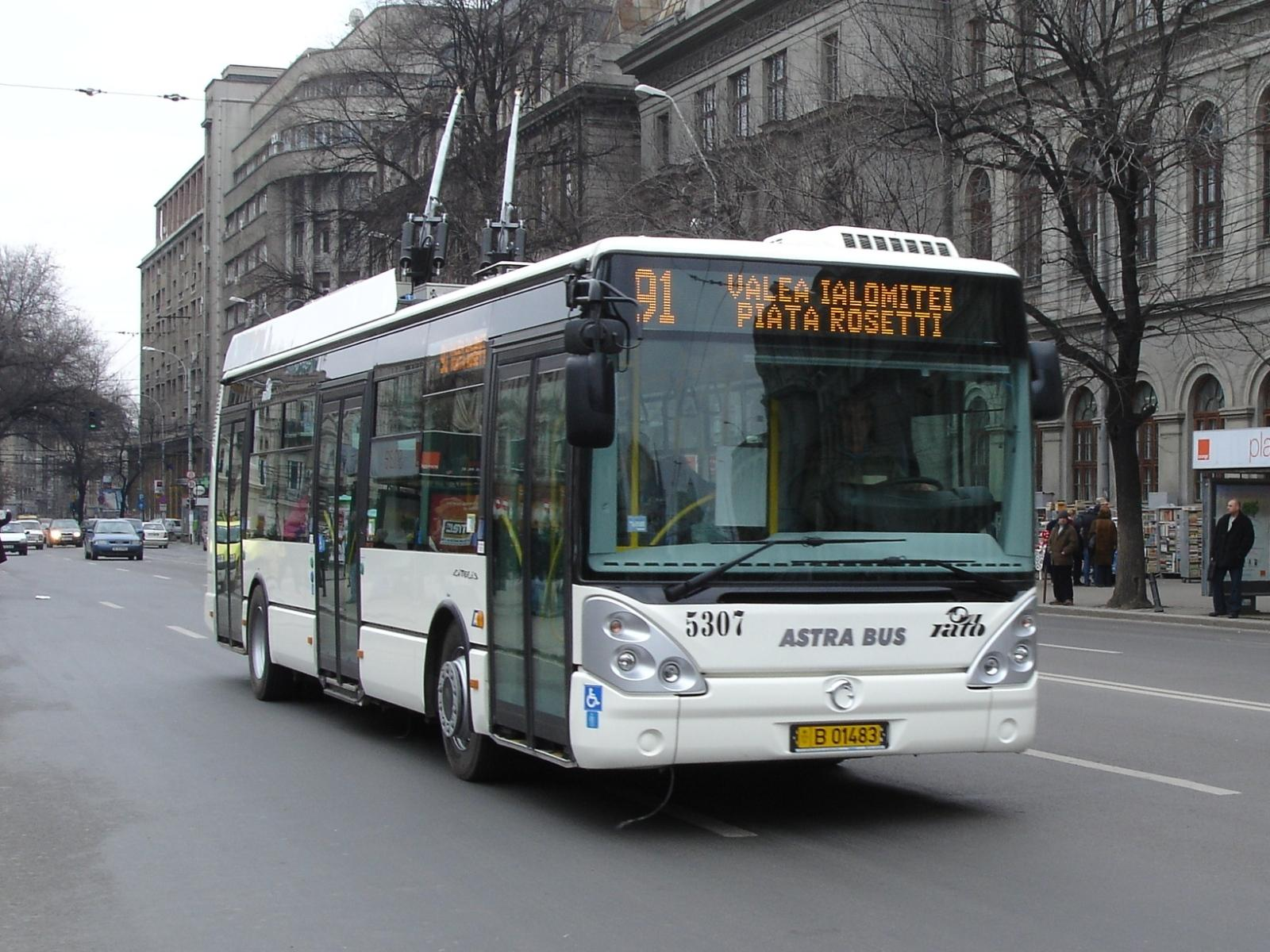
Yellow local administration plate on a Bucharest trolleybus

The coat of arms or initials of the city or village is often used on the left, followed by a number of fixed-length number (4 to 6 digits, always the same size within the same issuing authority). The first number to be issued is usually 1, zero-padded to the left.

Vehicles bearing yellow plates may not leave the jurisdiction of the authority that issued the plate, but some of them can cross county borders on occasion, for example rental scooters, vehicles being towed, or trolleybuses on their way from the factory to the depot. In the case of rental vehicles such as scooters or quad bikes, they tend to retain the registration plates issued by the authority of the region where the owner resides even when they are used in another jurisdiction.

Dual-powered buses are registered with standard number plates.

Trams do not have to bear the plate itself, but are required to somehow bear the registration number, either painted or printed on a sticker, usually next to their fleet number.

== County codes ==
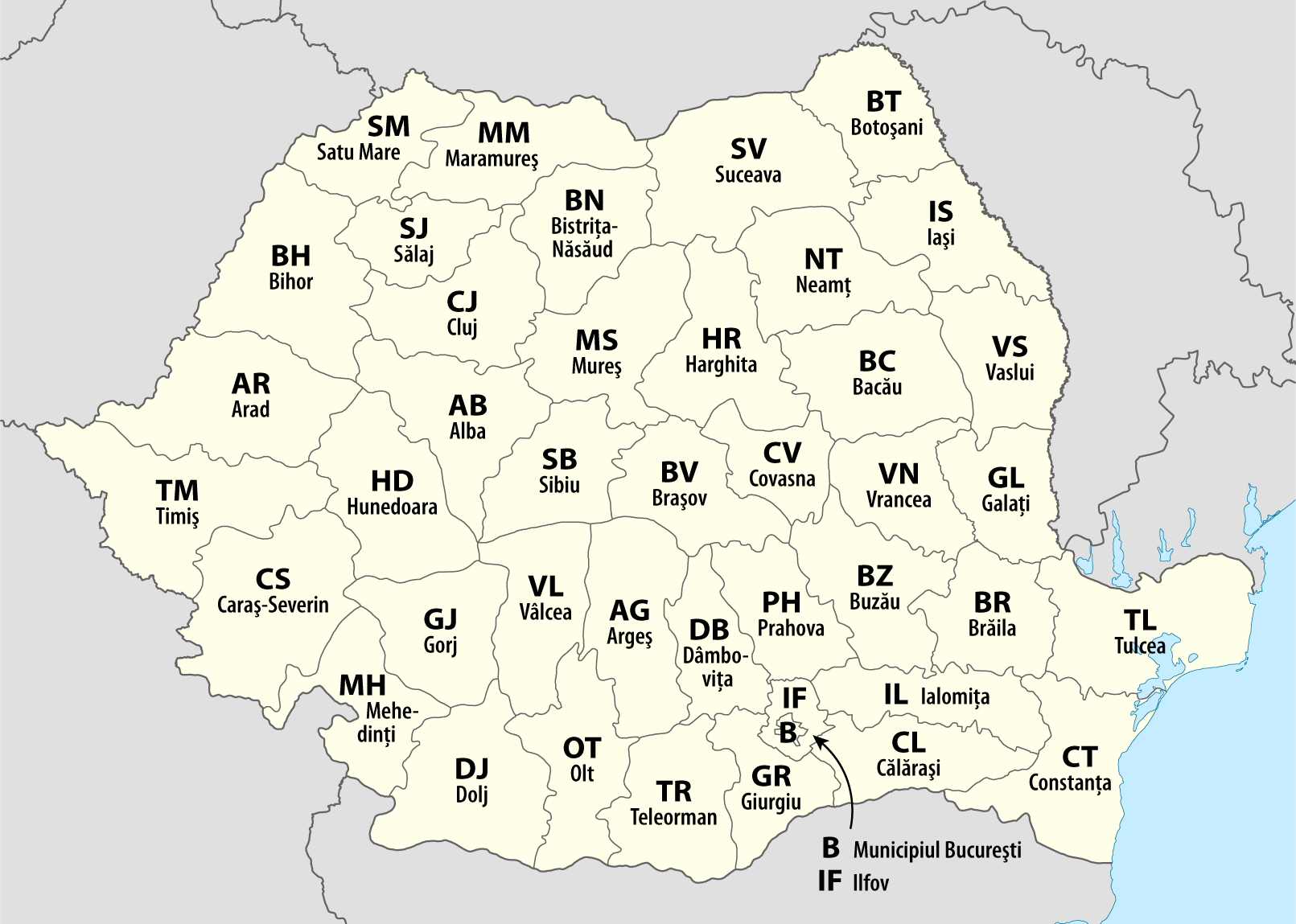
Map of the codes.

This is the table of counties, their county code and their county capital cities.

| Code | County | Capital |
|---|---|---|
| B | - | Bucharest |
| AB | Alba | Alba Iulia |
| AG | Argeş | Pitești |
| AR | Arad | Arad |
| BC | Bacău | Bacău |
| BH | Bihor | Oradea |
| BN | Bistrița-Năsăud | Bistrița |
| BR | Brăila | Brăila |
| BT | Botoșani | Botoșani |
| BV | Brașov | Brașov |
| BZ | Buzău | Buzău |
| CJ | Cluj | Cluj-Napoca |
| CL | Călărași | Călărași |
| CS | Caraș-Severin | Reșița |
| CT | Constanța | Constanța |
| CV | Covasna | Sfântu Gheorghe |
| DB | Dâmbovița | Târgoviște |
| DJ | Dolj | Craiova |
| GJ | Gorj | Târgu Jiu |
| GL | Galați | Galați |
| GR | Giurgiu | Giurgiu |
| HD | Hunedoara | Deva |
| HR | Harghita | Miercurea Ciuc |
| IF | Ilfov | Bucharest |
| IL | Ialomița | Slobozia |
| IS | Iași | Iași |
| MH | Mehedinți | Drobeta-Turnu Severin |
| MM | Maramureș | Baia Mare |
| MS | Mureș | Târgu Mureș |
| NT | Neamț | Piatra Neamț |
| OT | Olt | Slatina |
| PH | Prahova | Ploiești |
| SB | Sibiu | Sibiu |
| SJ | Sălaj | Zalău |
| SM | Satu Mare | Satu Mare |
| SV | Suceava | Suceava |
| TL | Tulcea | Tulcea |
| TM | Timiș | Timișoara |
| TR | Teleorman | Alexandria |
| VL | Vâlcea | Râmnicu Vâlcea |
| VN | Vrancea | Focșani |
| VS | Vaslui | Vaslui |

== History ==
=== 1900–1908 ===
The first vehicle registration plate in Romania was issued in 1900 to Bazil Assan, bearing the number 1.

This created a problem with Prince Bibescu, who was a keen automotive enthusiast, president of the Romanian Automobile Club and avid car racer, and wanted to have the first license plate, so he was issued plate number 0 (zero). Bibescu's car is exhibited today at the National Museum of Romanian History.

In the beginning the plates took the simple form of white numbers on a black background and could even be home made. Registration was done by the Mayor of Bucharest and the numbers identified the owner rather than the car. They were assigned in the order they were requested, without differentiating between physical persons and organizations. As there were so few cars in the country (139 in 1908, 169 in 1909) it was not necessary to note the region on the number plate, and the entire updated list was published monthly in the "Revista Automobilă" magazine, edited by the Romanian Royal Automobile club.

=== 1908–1966 ===
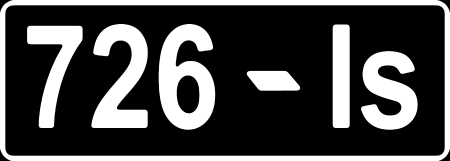
Ismail license plate (interwar period)

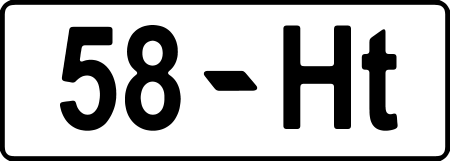
Hotin license plate (interwar period)

External images
- Bucharest license plate (1908)
- Sighişoara license plate (1908)

On August 15, 1908, a letter sent by the Romanian Automobile Club to the Chief Commissioner of Police mentions the need for a new system of license plates, which would see that all plates use the same size and font and include the name of the city where the vehicle was registered. The new system was approved by the police very soon after and a car participating to a race on October 26, 1908 can already be seen bearing the number "9-Bc" (Bucharest).

As the new system became more and more common-place, the county was usually indicated by adding a hyphen and the regional abbreviation, which was derived from the main letters of the county capital. Ilfov County, for example, was represented by B for Bucharest (Bc before 1914), while Craiova, Cv, represented Dolj.

Some period photos of, for example, Lugoj show the abbreviation Lgs appearing both before and after the number, although by the 1930s the number invariably came first.

Plates tended to be white on a black background until the late 1920s, when the system gradually moved to black on a white background.

This system was in place until 1966. The frequent territorial and administrative changes of the period meant that the codes changed often, and after December 1960 they started being based on the region's name rather than the name of the main regional city. So, after 1960 a car registered in Craiova as 150-Cv would have changed its license plate to 150-OL, corresponding to the new administrative region Oltenia. Similarly, when Brașov changed its name to "Orașul Stalin" in 1952, the regional code was also changed to O.S., before reverting to Br briefly and then BV after the changes of December 1960.

Special numbers were used occasionally to denote the type of vehicles they were on. For a while in the 1930s, in Bucharest, numbers between 10,000-B and 12,999-B (the comma was used as thousands separator) were taxis; they carried Tx as an additional tag, as did buses, which started with 15,000-B. Around 1952, commercial vehicles began to be given numbers over 25,101, specialised commercial vehicles and buses numbers over 50,101, tractors over 65,101 and motorcycles over 75,101. Around 1959, to create a distinction between state-owned and privately owned cars, the latter were given numbers beginning with 5,001 in the provinces and 15,001 in Bucharest. By 1966, when the system was changed, the numbers for cars allocated to Bucharest were all taken and a new system was needed.

In the pre-war period 0 was the smallest number possible (although in practice most counties started counting at 1). After 1952 numbers started with 101, possibly influenced by the Soviet system, where they started with 01-01.

Pre-war county codes (1913)

| Code | Capital | County |
|---|---|---|
| P t | Pitești | Argeș |
| B a | Bacău | Bacău |
| F t | Fălticeni | Baia/Suceava |
| B l | Brăila | Brăila |
| B t | Botoșani | Botoșani |
| B z | Buzău | Buzău |
| B g | Bazargic | Caliacra |
| C ț | Constanța | Constanța |
| G l | Galați | Covurlui |
| T g | Târgoviște | Dâmbovița |
| C v | Craiova | Dolj |
| D r | Dorohoi | Dorohoi |
| S l | Silistra | Durostor |
| H ș | Huși | Fălciu |
| T j | Târgu Jiu | Gorj |
| C l | Călărași | Ialomița |
| I ș | Iași | Iași |
| B c (apoi B) | București | Ilfov |
| T s | Turnu-Severin | Mehedinți |
| C p | Câmpulung-Muscel | Muscel |
| P n | Piatra Neamț | Neamț |
| S t | Slatina | Olt |
| P l | Ploiești | Prahova |
| F ș | Focșani | Putna |
| R s | Râmnicu-Sărat | Râmnicu-Sărat |
| R m | Roman | Roman |
| C r | Caracal | Romanați |
| T c | Tecuci | Tecuci |
| T m | Turnu-Măgurele | Teleorman |
| T l | Tulcea | Tulcea |
| B d | Bârlad | Tutova |
| R v | Râmnicu-Vâlcea | Vâlcea |
| V s | Vaslui | Vaslui |
| G g | Giurgiu | Vlașca |

Interwar-period county codes:

| Code | Capital | County |
|---|---|---|
| Al | Alba Iulia | Alba (Aj was used in the early 1920s, for Alba-de-jos) |
| Ar | Arad | Arad |
| Pt | Pitești | Argeș |
| Bc | Bacău | Bacău |
| Flt | Fălticeni | Baia |
| Bț | Bălți | Bălți |
| Bei | Beiuș | Bihor (1941–1944) |
| Ord | Oradea | Bihor (Or.M was used in the early 1920s) |
| Br | Brăila | Brăila |
| Bv | Brașov | Brașov |
| Bt | Botoșani | Botoșani |
| Bz | Buzău | Buzău |
| Bzg | Bazargic | Caliacra |
| Ch | Cahul | Cahul |
| Orv | Oravița | Caraș (Occasionally seen as Orț) |
| C.Lg | Câmpu-Lung | Câmpu-Lung |
| Ch.N | Chilia Nouă | Chilia (1941-1944) |
| Mr.C | Miercurea Ciuc | Ciuc (Cc.S was used in the early 1920s) |
| Cți | Cernăuți | Cernăuți |
| C.Al | Cetatea Albă | Cetatea Albă |
| Clj | Cluj | Cluj (Cojocna in the early 1920s) |
| Cța | Constanța | Constanța |
| Cțm | Coțmeni | Coțmeni (1919–1925) |
| Gl | Galați | Covurlui |
| Tg | Târgoviște | Dâmbovița |
| Cv | Craiova | Dolj |
| Dr | Dorohoi | Dorohoi |
| Sl | Silistra | Durostor |
| Hș | Huși | Fălciu |
| Fgs | Făgăraș | Făgăraș (also Fgș) |
| Tg.J | Târgu Jiu | Gorj |
| Gr.H | Gura Humorului | Gura Humorului (1919–1925) |
| Ht | Hotin | Hotin |
| Dv | Deva | Hunedoara (Huniedoara in the early 1920s) |
| Cl | Călărași | Ialomița |
| Iș | Iași | Iași |
| B | București | Ilfov |
| Is | Ismail | Ismail |
| Chș | Chișinău | Lăpușna |
| Sgt | Sighet | Maramureș |
| Tr.S | Turnu-Severin | Mehedinți |
| Tg.M | Târgu Mureș | Mureș (Mureș-Turda in the early 1920s) |
| Cp.L | Câmpulung-Muscel | Muscel |
| Btr | Bistriţa | Năsăud (Bistrița Năsăud in the early 1920s) |
| P.N | Piatra Neamț | Neamț |
| Odh | Odorhei | Odorhei |
| St | Slatina | Olt |
| Oh | Orhei | Orhei |
| Pl | Ploești | Prahova |
| Fș | Focșani | Putna |
| Rdț | Rădăuți | Rădăuți |
| Rm.S | Râmnicu-Sărat | Râmnicu-Sărat |
| Ro | Roman | Roman |
| Cr | Caracal | Romanați |
| St.M | Satu Mare | Satu Mare (Sat-Mar in the early 1920s) |
| Zal | Zalău | Sălaj (Zil was also seen in the 1920s, for Sălagiu) |
| Lgș | Lugoj | Severin (Lgj was also seen in the 1930s, Caraș-Severin in the early 1920s) |
| Sib | Sibiu | Sibiu |
| Sir | Siret | Siret (1919-1925) |
| Dej | Dej | Someș (Solnoc-Dobâca in the early 1920s) |
| Sor | Soroca | Soroca |
| Stj | Storojineț | Storojineț |
| Suc | Suceava | Suceava |
| Sgș | Sighișoara | Târnava-Mare (Seg was also seen) |
| D-in | Diciosânmartin | Târnava-Mică (pre 1926, D.Sm was also used) |
| Blj | Blaj | Târnava-Mică (post 1926) |
| Tc | Tecuci | Tecuci |
| Tr.M | Turnu-Măgurele | Teleorman |
| Tmș | Timișoara | Timiș-Torontal |
| Tgh | Tighina | Tighina |
| St.G | Sfântu-Gheorghe | Trei-Scaune |
| Tl | Tulcea | Tulcea |
| Trd | Turda | Turda (Turda-Arieș in the early 1920s) |
| Bd | Bârlad | Tutova (Ba was used in the early 1920s) |
| Rm.V | Râmnicu-Vâlcea | Vâlcea |
| Vs | Vaslui | Vaslui |
| Vsc | Văscăuți | Văscăuți (1919–1925, also Vșc) |
| Vjn | Vijnița | Vijnița (1919–1925) |
| Gg | Giurgiu | Vlașca |
| Ztv | Zastavna | Zastavna (1919–1925) |

1950-1952 People's Republic of Romania region codes:

| Code | Capital | Region |
|---|---|---|
| Ar | Arad | Arad |
| Ptș | Pitești | Argeș |
| Bc | Bacău | Bacău |
| Bd | Bârlad | Bârlad |
| B.Mr | Baia Mare | Baia Mare |
| Ord | Oradea | Bihor |
| Btr | Bistrița | Rodna |
| Bt | Botoșani | Botoșani |
| Bz | Buzău | Buzău |
| Crs | Caransebeș | Severin |
| O.S | Orașul Stalin (Brașov) | Stalin |
| Clj | Cluj | Cluj |
| Cța | Constanța | Constanța |
| Gl | Galați | Galați |
| Cv | Craiova | Dolj |
| Tg.J | Târgu Jiu | Gorj |
| Dv | Deva | Hunedoara |
| Cl | Călărași | Ialomița |
| Iș | Iași | Iași |
| B | București | Ilfov |
| Tg.M | Târgu Mureș | Mureș |
| Pl | Ploești | Prahova |
| Fș | Focșani | Putna |
| Sib | Sibiu | Sibiu |
| Sv | Suceava | Suceava |
| Ro.V | Roșiori de Vede | Teleorman |
| Tmș | Timișoara | Timișoara |
| Rm.V | Râmnicu-Vâlcea | Vâlcea |

=== 1966–1992 ===
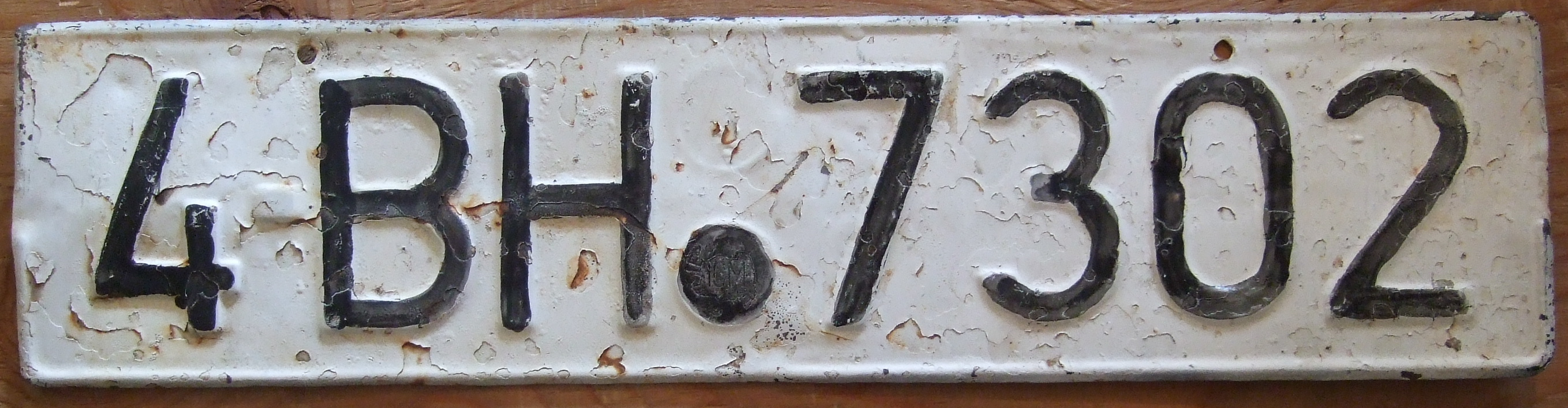
Old Romanian license plate (1966–1992)

By the 1960s all regional codes were two letters long and capitalised. In 1966 the license plate system was completely overhauled. The new plates were issued in the format aa-BB-ccccc:

- The numbers in front (aa) were arranged as follows:
  - 1 to 19 – automobiles, since 1990 all private vehicles, regardless of type
  - 20 – reserved for automobiles, but never used
  - 21 to 30 – freight transport vehicles, including lorry tractor units; also buses, if modified for freight transport
  - 31 to 40 – buses, coaches and utility vehicles
  - 41 to 45 – road tractors
  - 46 to 50 – motorcycles.
- The letters (BB) denoted the administrative regions until 1968, and after that counties (județe). Following the 1968 reorganisation of Romania's counties, new codes were introduced. These represented generally the same counties as the ones used today (see the county codes). However, between 1966 and 1968, some old codes were used. Thus, a registration plate for Ploiesti region would be 1-PL-1234, which would have changed after 1968 to 1-PH-1234 (for Prahova). Many codes, however, did not need to change: Bucharest (B) and Cluj (CJ), for example, remained the same.
- The numbers after the county abbreviation (ccccc) were in groups of either three, four or five digits, and were issued in ascending order, starting from 101. The old plates were declared invalid. 101 as the first number may have come from the Soviet-style "first number" 01-01.
- Numbers with 5 digits after the county code were issued only in Bucharest. It started with 1-B-10000 to 1-B-99999, then 2-B-10000 to 59999, until the change of the system. 9-B-10001 to 9-B-39999 were issued, between the early 1980s and 1992, for Ilfov (or the Ilfov Agricultural Sector). Up until the 1980s Ilfov plates were registered IF, an abbreviation which would return in 2005.

1960-1968 region codes

| Code | Capital | Region |
|---|---|---|
| AG | Pitești | Argeș |
| BC | Bacău | Bacău |
| BT | Timișoara | Banat |
| BV | Brașov | Brașov (very briefly BR after the name reverted to Brașov) |
| B | București | București |
| CJ | Cluj | Cluj |
| CR | Oradea | Crișana |
| DB | Constanța | Dobrogea |
| GL | Galați | Galați |
| HD | Deva | Hunedoara |
| IS | Iași | Iași |
| MR | Baia Mare | Maramureș |
| MS | Tîrgu Mureș | Regiunea Mureș-Autonomă Maghiară |
| OL | Craiova | Oltenia |
| PL | Ploiești | Ploiești |
| SV | Suceava | Suceava |

An interesting development was the connection between the license plate and the social status of the car owner. For example, the "important" cars (i.e. those belonging to the nomenklatura) generally used 1, then the county, then three digits. Nicolae Ceaușescu's ARO sported the "1-B-111" license plate. By the mid-1970s, any plate with three digits was considered important (regardless of the number at the front), and although older cars had been initially issued with three-digit combinations, many owners were "asked" by the authorities to change their numbers. In an age where most people had the same car - the Dacia - such distinguishing features were considered important. By the 1980s, in Bucharest 1-B with 3 or 4 digits and 2-B and 3-B with three digits were also considered important numbers. Furthermore, the legend that the three-digit formula, where the middle number was the sum of the other two numbers, signified real importance sprang up. Thus, many senior Communist leaders had numbers such as 1-B-363, while the Neamț County party secretary had 1-NT-165 on his black Volga.

From circa 1977 foreign citizens and organizations were issued plates with 12-B (12-xx in other counties). 14-B was used for rental cars, but since 1990 some official cars had such number plates too.

There were also some stylistic variations. Numbers on a yellow (rather than white) background were state property, but since all trucks, buses and other heavy vehicles were state property, those with yellow background plates belonged to ministries or other special state organizations. Numbers with white letters on a black background were issued to vehicles of the foreign organizations in Romania, but also to vehicles belonging to religious organizations.

Temporary plates had the county code and then a number beginning with 0; test drive plates had a number beginning with 0 and then the county - occasionally with "Probe" written on them too.

In late 1977 the manufacture of plates was standardized and they were all made on a pressed steel rectangle; previously plates had been plastic, cast iron, enamel, porcelain or even plaster. In around 1982, after 19-B-9999 had been reached, it was decided to begin the series 1-B with five digits. In 1983, after a brief reorganization of the counties, IF (Ilfov County) was dropped, CL (Călărași County) and GR (Giurgiu County) were introduced, and the Bucharest Agricultural Sector (Sectorul Agricol Ilfov) issued plates beginning with 9-B and followed by five digits. The fonts used on the number plates changed slightly in 1988.

=== 1992–2007 ===
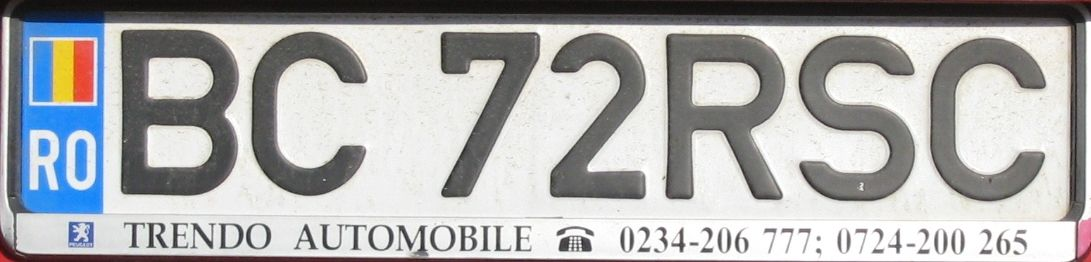
License plate issued between 1992 and 2007

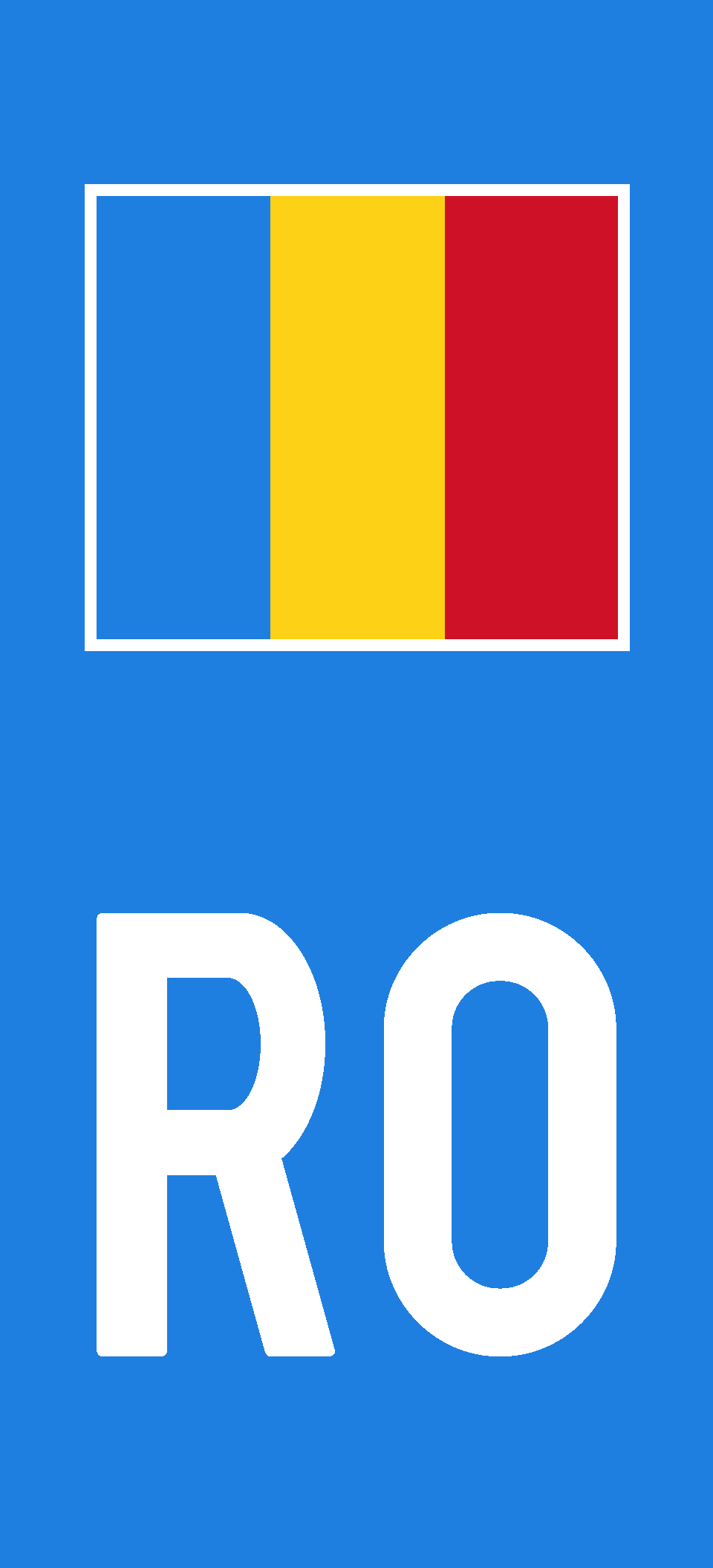
Romanian stripe (1992-2007)

The modern plate style was changed in 1992, when new reflective plates were introduced, with the numbering system still in use today. Initially, these plates were issued in very small numbers for official vehicles, and most other vehicles still had plates issued under the old system, until the end of May 1993. The old plates remained valid until 2000.

On plates issued before January 1, 2007 the flag of Romania was used instead of the 12 European stars.

The new plate design fell in line with modern requirements, allowed far more combinations while simultaneously being simpler to read and remember, mandated the use of reflective plates thus contributing to road safety, and minimized the additional changes required for when Romania would join the European Union.

== Special plates ==
=== Historical military plates ===
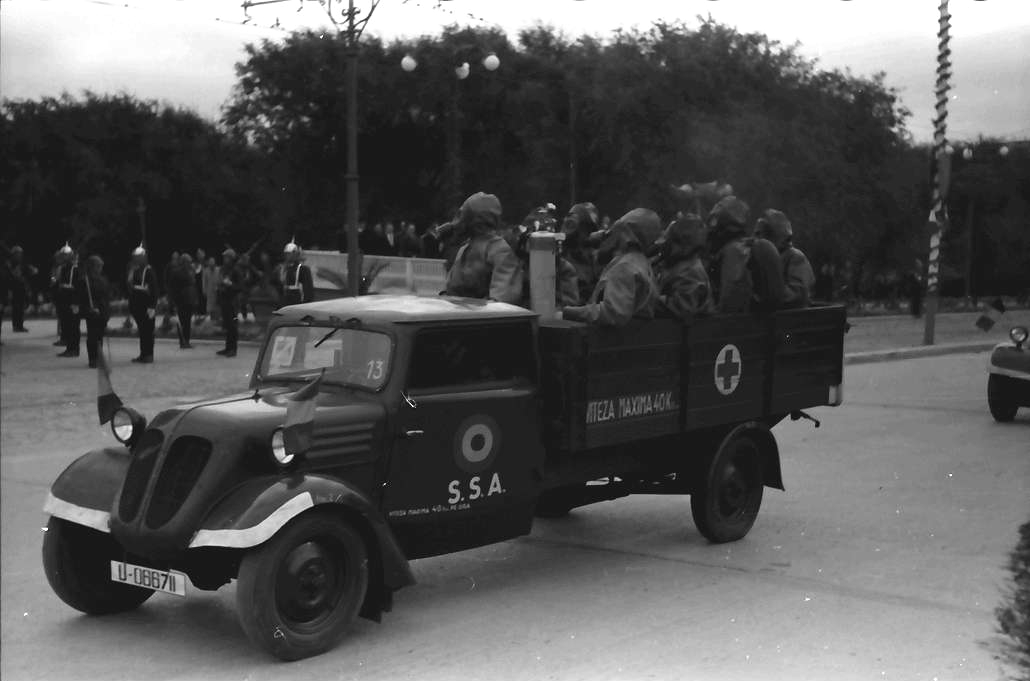
Ground Forces truck

The license plates before around 1945 were white and had a number beginning with a zero. In front of the number was the initial of the Ministry of Defense State Undersecretaries:

- U for the Ground Forces (U for Uscat, Land)
- A for the Air Force (A for Aer, Air)
- M for the Navy (M for Marină, Navy)
- I for the Logistics (I for Înzestrare, Logistics).

This system was subsequently abolished and all military vehicles switched to the prefix A (for Armată, Armed forces) in front of the registered numbers, which start at 100. Numbers smaller than 10,000 tend to be reserved for cars.

=== Old diplomatic plates ===
In the inter-war period these were standard plates, with "CD" prefix attached to them. By 1951 oval diplomatic plates were introduced, with CD (Corps Diplomatique) in red above a three- or four- digit number, in black. By 1965 square plates for TC (auxiliary staff) were also being issued. In the early years (at least up till 1959), CD plates had the year at the bottom, in small lettering.

=== Citizen of Honor ===
In the pre-1968 system, "CO" (Cetățean de Onoare, Citizen of Honor) was occasionally seen on private cars before 1941.

=== Traffic monitoring ===
Vehicles belonging to traffic monitoring service had a plate with the text "Controlul circulaţiei" (Traffic monitoring) and a serial number.

=== Transnistria ===
Wartime Transnistria occupied by Romanian forces briefly had its own special plates. These began Tr-number-regional suffix. Thus, the Cadillac of the regional administrator had Tr-1-Ods (for Odesa). These numbers were very short-lived.

Crown shown on royal family vehicles

=== Royal family ===
Vehicles belonging to Romanian royal family all had a rectangular white plate with a drawing of the Steel crown of Romania in the middle.

== Urban myths and popular culture ==
- In Communist Romania, certain license plates such as those starting with 1-B were issued only to high-ranking Communist leaders and their proteges. Many of them changed their license plates to fake military plates in the weeks following the Romanian Revolution, in order to avoid trouble. Others, such as tennis player Ilie Năstase, chose to still drive cars with plates 1-B-101 and 1-B-106 for many years afterward.
- Urban myths ascribing special meaning to certain license plate combinations crop up all the time. Such combinations have included plates starting with B 06, plates where the letter groups includes or starts with a W, and plates where the letter group has additional spacing between the letters. Some myths have some connection to reality; for example, the W myth may be related to the fact that the Protection and Guard Service chose to assign the combination WST to their entire car fleet, leading people to surmise that a car with such a license plate would not be pulled over by Police.
- Some letter combinations are far more popular than others. Among these stand out XXX, HEL (hell), IAD (hell), RAY and GOD. The customized combinations outnumber random assignments almost 3:1.

== See also ==
- Vehicle registration plates of Bulgaria
- Vehicle registration plates of Hungary
- Vehicle registration plates of Moldova
- Vehicle registration plates of Serbia
- Vehicle registration plates of Ukraine
