= Coat of arms of the Romanian Ministry of Internal Affairs =

Coat of arms

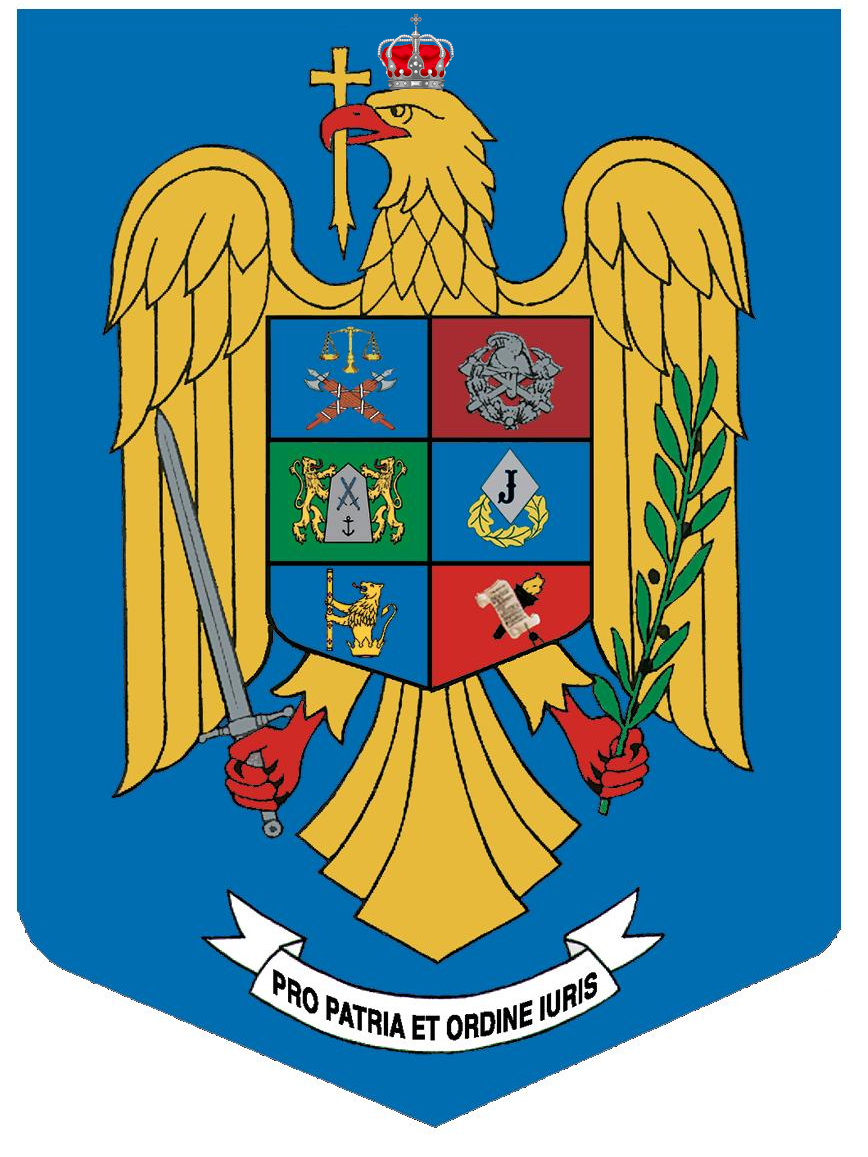
- Adopted: 2008 (?)
- Shield: party per pale, double party per fess; first quartier: symbols of the General Inspectorate of Romanian Police; second quartier: symbols of the General Inspectorate for Emergency Situations; third quartier: symbols of the General Inspectorate of Border Police; fourth quartier: symbols of the General Inspectorate of Romanian Gendarmerie fifth quartier:symbols of the administration authorities; sixth quartier: symbols of the National Archives;
- Motto: Latin: PRO PATRIA ET ORDINE IURIS
- Other elements: large blue shield with a crusader golden eagle, having its head turned to the right, red peak and claws, open wings, holding a silver sword in its right claw, and a green olive branch in its left claw
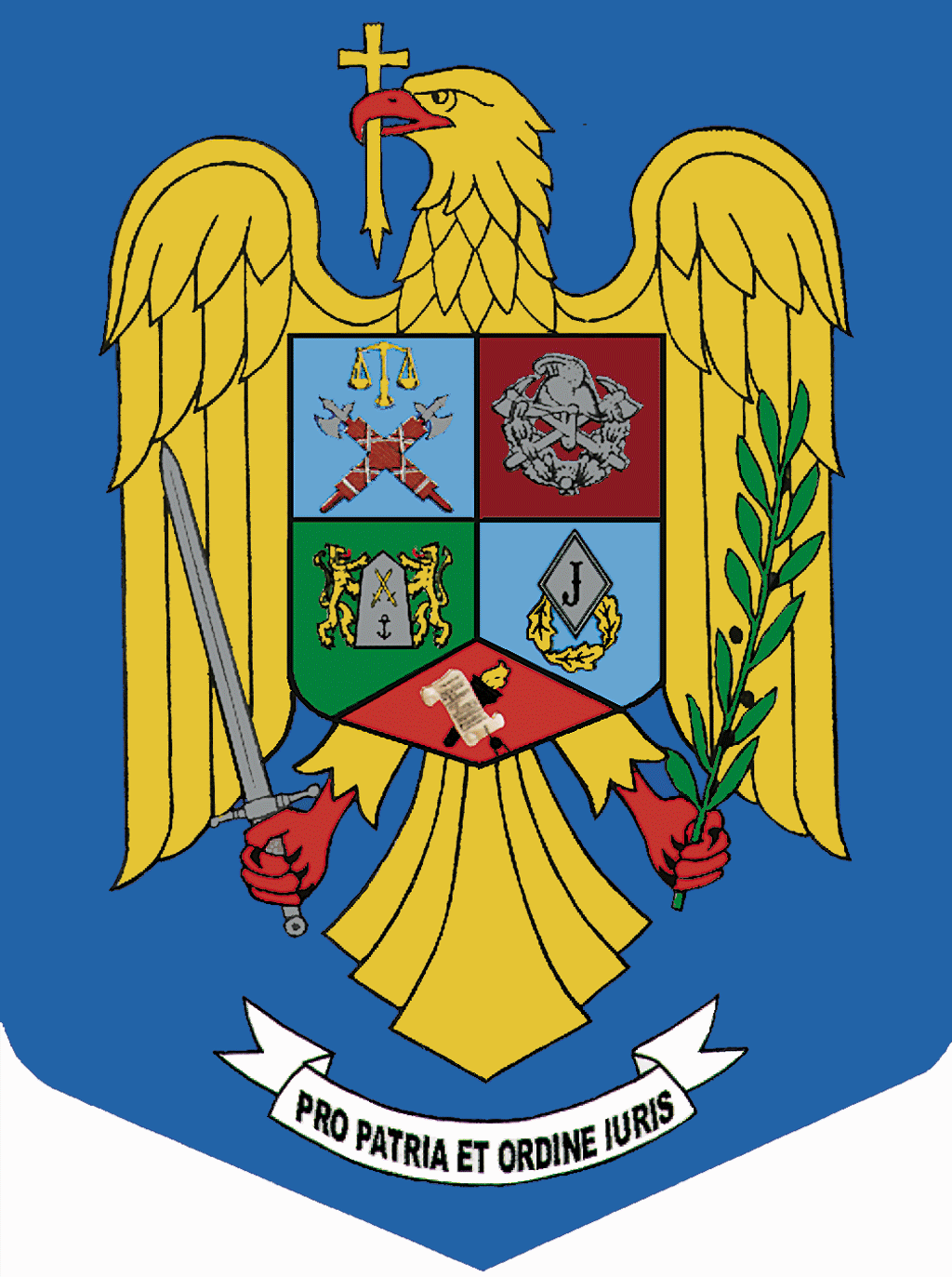
- Earlier version(s): Without the symbols of the administration authorities

The heraldic ensigns of the Ministry of Internal Affairs consist of the following elements: large blue shield with a crusader golden eagle, having its head turned to the right, red peak and claws, open wings, holding a silver sword in its right claw; the green olive branch, symbolizing peace and order, replacing the mace from the coat of arms of the country; the small shield, placed on the eagle's chest, having five sectors which symbolize the most important structures of the ministry; at the bottom of the external shield, on a white scarf, the motto of the ministry is written in black: Latin: PRO PATRIA ET ORDINE IURIS, meaning "For the country and for the lawful order". The first sector represents the General Inspectorate of Romanian Police, the second sector includes the heraldic ensigns of the General Inspectorate for Emergency Situations, the third sector contains the ensigns of the General Inspectorate of Border Police, the fourth sector represents the General Inspectorate of Romanian Gendarmerie, the fifth sector represents the Administration, and the sixth sector contains the emblem of the National Archives.

== Police ==
The heraldic ensigns of the Romanian Police consist of the following elements: large blue shield with a crusader golden eagle, having its head turned to the right, red peak and claws, open wings, holding a silver sword in its right claw; the green olive branch, symbolizing peace and order, replacing the mace from the coat of arms of the country. The small blue shield, placed on the eagle's chest, having a golden balance having its scales well-balanced, in the upper part, and, in its lower part, two Roman fasces, crossed and natural; at the bottom of the external shield, on a white scarf, the motto of the ministry is written in black: Latin: LEX ET HONOR.

The balance symbolizes the social justice, highlighting the competence of the institution in the field of law enforcement. The Roman fasces evoke the attributions of the Romanian Police in a lawful state, as a guarantee of public order.

== Inspectorate for Emergency Situations ==
The heraldic ensigns of the Inspectorate for Emergency Situations consist of the following elements: large blue shield with a crusader golden eagle, having its head turned to the right, red peak and claws, open wings, holding a silver sword in its right claw; the green olive branch, symbolizing peace and order, replacing the mace from the coat of arms of the country. The small purple shield, placed on the eagle's chest, having a firefighter helmet superposed on two crossed hatchets. In the lower part of the emblem, an exploding grenade on whose sides there are oak branches. At the bottom of the external shield, on a white scarf, the motto of the ministry is written in black: Latin: AUDACIA ET DEVOTIO.

The firefighter helmet, superposed on two hatchets, are the traditional signs of the military firefighters.

== Border Police ==
The heraldic ensigns of the Border Police consist of the following elements: large blue shield with a crusader golden eagle, having its head turned to the right, red peak and claws, open wings, holding a silver sword in its right claw; the green olive branch, symbolizing peace and order, replacing the mace from the coat of arms of the country. The small green shield, placed on the eagle's chest, having a silver landmark which has, in its upper part, two crossed golden swords, and, in its lower part, a black natural anchor. The landmark is leant by, on both sides, by two golden lions with red tongues. At the bottom of the external shield, on a white scarf, the motto of the ministry is written in black: Latin: PATRIA ET HONOR.

The landmark with the anchor and the crossed swords evokes the idea of guarding and control, as well as the inviolability of the Romanian borders. The crossed swords symbolize the capacity of judging, of separating the guilt from the innocence, suggesting, as a whole, the constant guarding of the national borders. The lions symbolize vigilance, nobleness, heroism, suggesting the idea of a permanent guarding of the country borders. It also stands for power, authority, force, wisdom and energy in the service of good.

== Gendarmerie ==
The heraldic ensigns of the Gendarmerie consist of the following elements: large blue shield with a crusader golden eagle, having its head turned to the right, red peak and claws, open wings, holding a silver sword in its right claw; the green olive branch, symbolizing peace and order, replacing the mace from the coat of arms of the country. The small blue shield, placed on the eagle's chest, having a silver rhombus, coming out of a three leaf garland and having a stylized "J" letter in the midst. At the bottom of the external shield, on a white scarf, the motto of the ministry is written in black: Latin: LEX ET ORDO.

The rhombus symbolizes the life, the prosperity, the reward. The letter "J" signifies, since the nineteenth century, the Romanian Gendarmerie. The oak leaf garland symbolizes the power of sacrifice and duration of the lawful state.

== Administration ==
The heraldic ensigns of the Romanian Administration consist of the following elements: large blue shield with a crusader golden eagle, having its head turned to the right, red peak and claws, open wings, holding a silver sword in its right claw; the green olive branch, symbolizing peace and order, replacing the mace from the coat of arms of the country. The small blue shield, placed on the eagle's chest, having a golden lion emerging out of a golden open crown with five fleurons. The lion holds a golden baton, with five red fleur-de-lis. At the bottom of the external shield, on a white scarf, the motto of the ministry is written in black: .

The open crown symbolizes perfection, and by extension, independence. The fleur-de-lis stands for the nobility, dignity, and by extension the goodness. The sceptre represents the authority, the equilibrium, the civil administration. The lion stands for power, authority, force, wisdom and energy in the service of good.

This element was introduced in early 2008.

== National Archives ==
The heraldic ensigns of the National Archives consist of the following elements: large blue shield with a crusader golden eagle, having its head turned to the right, red peak and claws, open wings, holding a silver sword in its right claw; the green olive branch, symbolizing peace and order, replacing the mace from the coat of arms of the country. The small red shield, placed on the eagle's chest, having a natural unfurled parchment, validated by an attached red seal, having a black – framed border and a blue string. The parchment is superposed on a black torch with golden flames. At the bottom of the external shield, on a white scarf, the motto of the ministry is written in black: Latin: SEMPER VERITATI.

The unfurled parchment evokes the interest regarding the conservation and the usage of the National Archives Fund (Romanian: Fondul Arhivistic Naţional). The torch suggests the role played by the National Archives in the process of developing science and culture.
