= Coat of arms of the Romanian Inspectorate for Emergency Situations =

- Shield: purple shield with a firefighter helmet superposed on two crossed hatchets. In the lower part of the emblem, an exploding grenade on whose sides there are oak branches
- Motto: Latin: AUDACIA ET DEVOTIO

The heraldic ensigns of the Inspectorate for Emergency Situations consist of the following elements: large blue shield with a crusader golden eagle, having its head turned to the right, red peak and claws, open wings, holding a silver sword in its right claw; the green olive branch, symbolizing peace and order, replacing the mace from the coat of arms of the country. The small purple shield, placed on the eagle’s chest, having a firefighter helmet superposed on two crossed hatchets. In the lower part of the emblem, an exploding grenade on whose sides there are oak branches. At the bottom of the external shield, on a white scarf, the motto of the ministry is written in black: Latin: AUDACIA ET DEVOTIO.

The firefighter helmet, superposed on two hatchets, are the traditional signs of the military firefighters.
