= Romanian firefighting missions in Europe =

Since the beginning of 2020, the Romanian General Inspectorate for Emergency Situations and the Department for Emergency Situations have coordinated a series of missions to combat wildfires outside of Romania. These actions were launched in response to the increasing frequency of wildfires across Europe, especially in Mediterranean countries, and to fulfil Romania's commitments under the EU pre-positioning programme.

Following the initial deployments, firefighters were dispatched to numerous additional regions as the years went on. Their work earned praise from host nations for their efforts in containing the fires under extreme conditions.

== Locations ==
=== Greece ===
Extent of wildfires in Greece in August 2023. Through the EU Civil Protection Mechanism, Romania was among the countries that provided substantial assistance to affected areas.

In August 2021, Greece requested firefighting assistance from foreign nations. In response, Romania deployed 142 firefighters, 8 fire engines, 3 tankers, a command centre, and other equipment to aid the international effort.

In the summer of 2022, Romanian firefighters returned, now numbering 28 personnel and eight vehicles, alongside other European countries. They were among the first, together with Bulgaria, to arrive in the country. Following the government's response to the fires, Greece announced reforms to enhance its wildfire combat capabilities.

The situation intensified in 2023, when a record-breaking heatwave was expected to become the longest in history. Due to the damage it caused, the Greek government requested assistance from European countries again. More than 50 Romanian firefighters were deployed to affected areas, most notably Rhodes, to combat the fires and evacuate residents and tourists.

Additional assistance arrived in 2024 in Attica, where Romanian contingents, operated with multiple forest fire engines, water tankers (including a 30,000-litre tanker), and command vehicles while providing logistical support.

In 2025, a similar contingent of 40 firefighters and eight fire trucks joined the Greek effort, stationed again in Nea Makri, Attica.

The streak continued in 2026, with 120 Romanian firefighters deployed in three shifts at Nea Makri, concluding their mission alongside Greek colleagues and other EU partner nations in September.

=== Serbia ===
Due to difficulties containing the wildfires in Deliblatska Pescara, and following pressure from the opposition, Serbia activated the European Union Civil Protection Mechanism to receive help for the 3,500-hectare affected area. Foreign assistance included contributions from several EU member states, including Romania. The deployment comprised a Black Hawk helicopter, 69 firefighters, and 15 vehicles from Romania, which arrived in Bela Crkva.

The Romanian involvement was met with acclaim from both the Serbian public, via social media and local welcome, and officials, who formally conveyed their thanks.

=== France ===
Romania's first deployments to France came in 2022, during the 2022 European and Mediterranean wildfires. Confronting the worst fires France had seen in decades, Romanian firefighters joined teams from multiple EU member states in containment operations across the Gironde region, south of Bordeaux.

A new contingent was deployed in 2023, followed by another in 2024, both tasked with combating forest fires alongside French authorities. Each deployment involved 40 firefighters and 8 trucks stationed in southern France, with rotations of 40 new firefighters replacing them mid-mission.

The same pattern continued in 2025 and 2026. In 2025, a similar number of firefighters and vehicles were utilized in Narbonne under French coordination. The following year, a roughly equal number of forces arrived at Correns and were later redeployed to join the effort combating vegetation fires at Pontevès.

=== Albania ===
Following the 2019 devastating earthquake in Albania, which affected multiple regions across the country, the Albanian government activated the EU Civil Protection Mechanism. Romania responded by deploying a contingent to Durrës, comprising two C130 Hercules aircraft, along with 52 UN-accredited firefighters.

Following the 2024 wildfires in Greece and Albania, both nations activated the EU Civil Protection Mechanism. In response, the Romanian Armed Forces dispatched two aircraft to Kuçova Air Base: a C-27J Spartan for firefighting operations and a C-130 Hercules providing logistical support, with Romanian personnel deployed for nearly 10 days beginning August 2024.

== Cooperation ==
=== Hungary ===
In 2008, a training centre was being built in Bihor to train a joint Romanian-Hungarian firefighting force. The Romanian side would be tasked with search and rescue, while the Hungarian side would handle chemical and biological hazards, including debris search and interventions.

The Romanian facility was extended and the joint centre was inaugurated in 2020. Additionally, each side was required to learn the other's language to improve cooperation.
