= Haragîș =

- Village
- Coat of arms

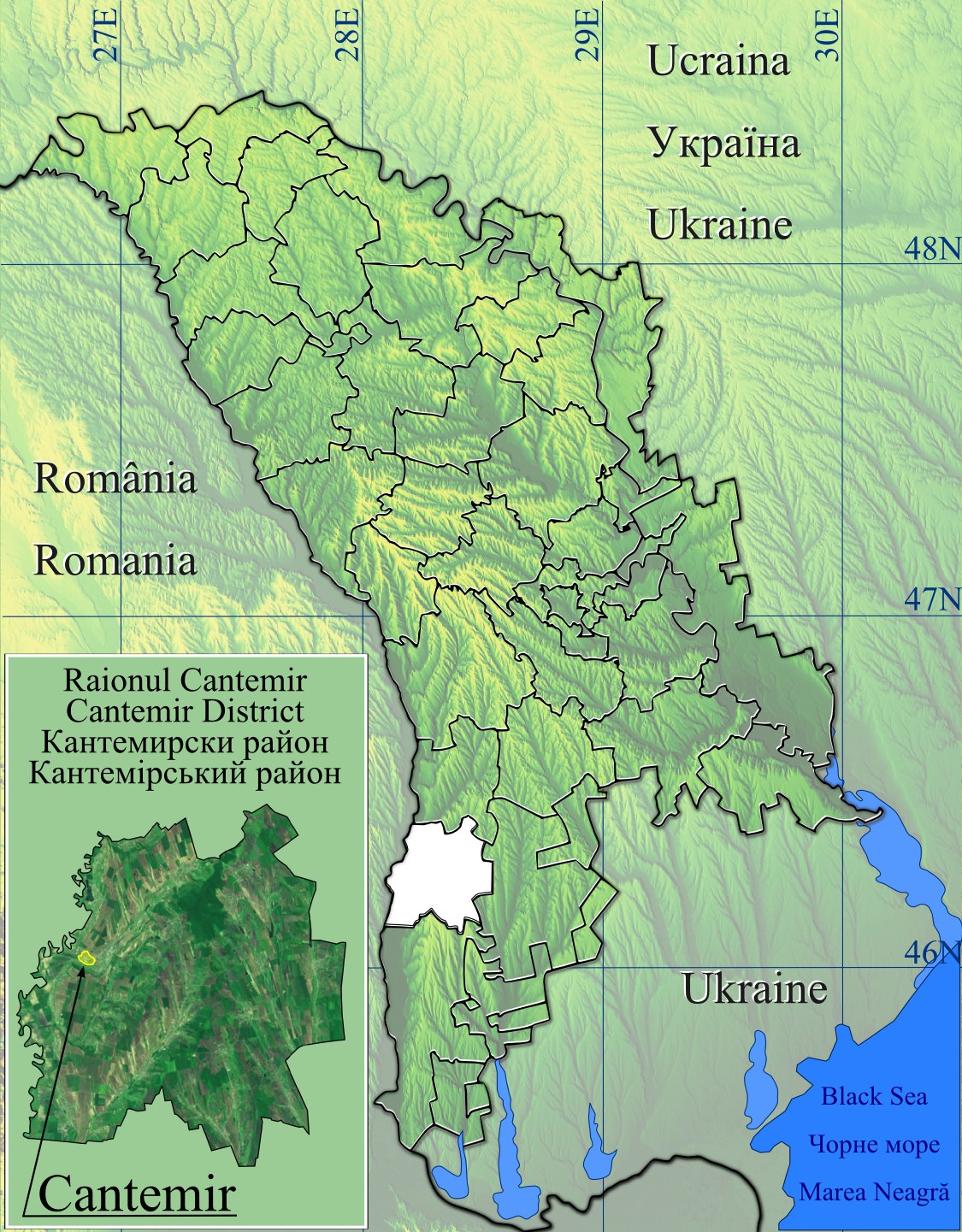
- Location within Cantemir
- Coordinates: 46°17′22″N 28°22′51″E
- Country: Moldova

Government
  - Mayor: Iurie Bălănuță (PDM)
- Elevation: 252 m (827 ft)

Population (2014 census)
  - Total: 815
- Time zone: UTC+2 (EET)
  - Summer (DST): UTC+3 (EEST)
- Postal code: MD-7327

Haragîș is a village located in the Cantemir District, in Southern Moldova. It is situated within the Tigheci Forests region, an area noted for its rolling landscapes and proximity to Moldova's prominent wine-producing subregions.

== Demographics ==
According to the 2014 Moldovan census, Haragîș had a population of 815 residents. The structure of the population is slightly more males, a majority (65.2%) of 15-64 year olds, and an overwhelming majority (98.8%) of people born in Moldova.

== History ==
Haragîș has been mentioned in old documents, dated to 1803, as the estate of the landowner Costache Ghica.

== Administration and local government ==
Haragîș is governed by a local council composed of nine members. The most recent local elections, in November 2023, resulted in the following composition: 8 councillors from the Party of European Social Democrats and 1 councillor from the Party of Action and Solidarity. In the same elections, the candidate from the Party of European Social Democrats, Iurie Bălănuță, was elected as mayor.

== Economy ==
Haragîș is part of the broader Tigheci Forests wine subregion, an area recognized for its viticulture and agricultural productivity. The region's soils and climate support both local Moldovan grape varieties and international cultivars, contributing to Moldova's reputation as a wine-producing country. The proximity to historical features such as Trajan's Wall adds cultural significance to the area.

== 2016 helicopter crash ==
In June 2016, a Romanian helicopter, belonging to the SMURD emergency rescue service, exploded mid-air and crashed near Haragîș. All four SMURD crew members died in the accident and were posthumously awarded the Order of the Republic. In 2019, they were commemorated, with the event attended by Daniel Ioniță, the Romanian Ambassador to Moldova.
