= Romanian General Inspectorate for Emergency Situations =

Romanian General Inspectorate for Emergency Situations Inspectoratul General pentru Situaţii de Urgenţă
- Coat of arms
- Common name: Pompierii
- Abbreviation: IGSU
- Motto: Audacia et Devotio; Courage and Devotion

Agency overview
- Formed: December 15, 2004

Jurisdictional structure
- National agency (Operations jurisdiction): Romania
- Operations jurisdiction: Romania
- Legal jurisdiction: As per operations jurisdiction

Operational structure
- Headquarters: Str. Dumitrache Banul nr. 46, Bucharest
- Agency executive: General **** Dan-Paul Iamandi, Inspector-General
- Child agencies: Fire and Civil Defense Services; Inspectorate for Emergency Situations (acronym: I.S.U.)

Website
- www.igsu.ro

The Romanian General Inspectorate for Emergency Situations (Romanian: Inspectoratul General pentru Situaţii de Urgenţă - IGSU) is a public structure subordinated to the Ministry of Internal Affairs, created on December 15, 2004, by merging the Civil Defense Command (Comandamentul Protecţiei Civile) with the General Inspectorate of the Military Firefighters Corps (Inspectoratul General al Corpului Pompierilor Militari). The structure is specialised in fire safety and civil protection.

At the national level, IGSU coordinates all the organizations involved in the management of emergency situations in compliance with international standards.

At the local level (in counties), the branches are called County Inspectorate for Emergency Situations (acronym: ISU), with each branch having multiple subunits (fire stations, detachments, intervention guards).

== Firefighter ranks ==
Commissioned officer ranks

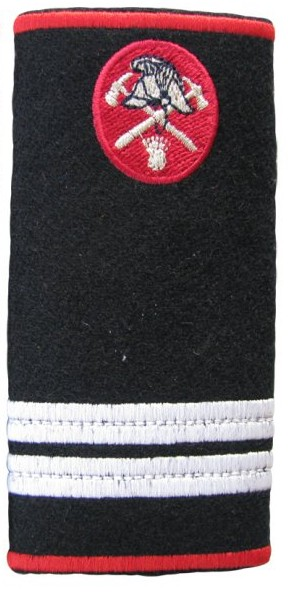
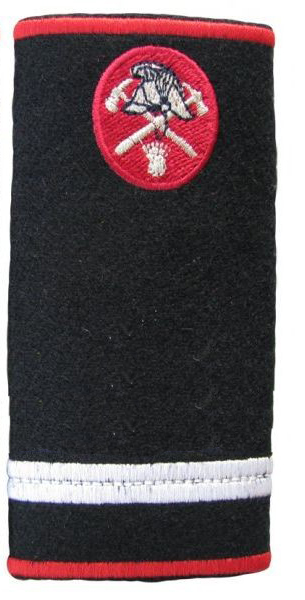
NATO code	OF-10	OF-9	OF-8	OF-7	OF-6	OF-5	OF-4	OF-3	OF-2	OF-1
(Romania) Romanian Military Firefighters Corps
(Romania) Romanian Military Firefighters Corps	Mareșal	General	General-locotenent	General-maior	General de brigadă	Colonel	Locotenent-colonel	Maior	Căpitan	Locotenent	Sublocotenent

Other ranks

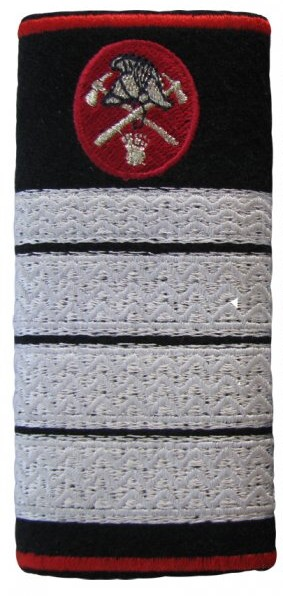
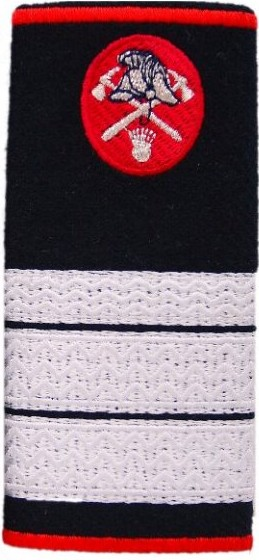
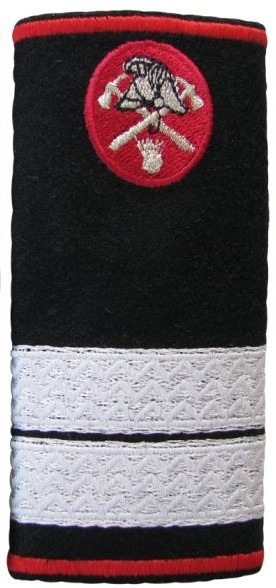
NATO code	OR-9		OR-8	OR-7	OR-6	OR-5	OR-4	OR-3	OR-2	OR-1
(Romania) Romanian Military Firefighters Corps
(Romania) Romanian Military Firefighters Corps	Plutonier adjutant șef	Plutonier adjutant	Plutonier-major	Plutonier	Sergent-major	Sergent

== See also ==
- Inspectorate for Emergency Situations (I.S.U.)
- SMURD
- List of fire departments
- Romanian firefighting missions in Europe
