= SMURD =

Romanian emergency rescue service

- Founded: 1990
- Founders: Dr. Raed Arafat and Firefighter Lt. Col Mircea Pintilie, co-founder Dr Adrian Lobonțiu, MD, FACS, Washington DC, United States of America
- Founded at: Târgu Mureș, Romania
- Headquarters: Bucharest
- Region served: Romania; Republic of Moldova
- Product: CareFlight
- Method: EMS / Air Ambulance
- Parent organization: Romanian General Inspectorate for Emergency Situations
- Website: www.smurd.ro

SMURD is an emergency rescue service based in Romania. SMURD is a structure subordinated to the Romanian General Inspectorate for Emergency Situations (IGSU). The name is the Romanian acronym for "Serviciul Mobil de Urgență, Reanimare și Descarcerare", which means Mobile Service for Emergency, Reanimation and Extrication. It was created and has been coordinated since its inception by doctor Raed Arafat. The first SMURD unit was created in Târgu Mureș, a city in the center of Transylvania, in 1990. One of the notable co-founders is a Romanian Firefighter Lt. Col. Mircea Pintilie who coordinated the activity between firebrigades from the three countries, Romania, Norway and Great Britain.

In October 1996, the service received legal recognition under the Military Firemen Corps law no.121. Until that date, it served as a national pilot center.

Now SMURD is a complementary service, with bases covering many parts of the country, still expanding. It deals with the worst emergency cases, all in a collaboration with the regular Ambulance Service (Serviciul de Ambulanţă). Also, HEMS (helicopter emergency medical system) was enforced in seven cities (Târgu Mureș, Bucharest, Iași, Arad, Craiova, Brașov and Constanța), while in other cities the system is only ambulance based. Depending on the situation, police and army helicopters are also being used.

The emergency system used by this service is based on the European 112 emergency phone number, now also used in Romania for all the emergencies (police, firefighters, ambulance).

== History ==
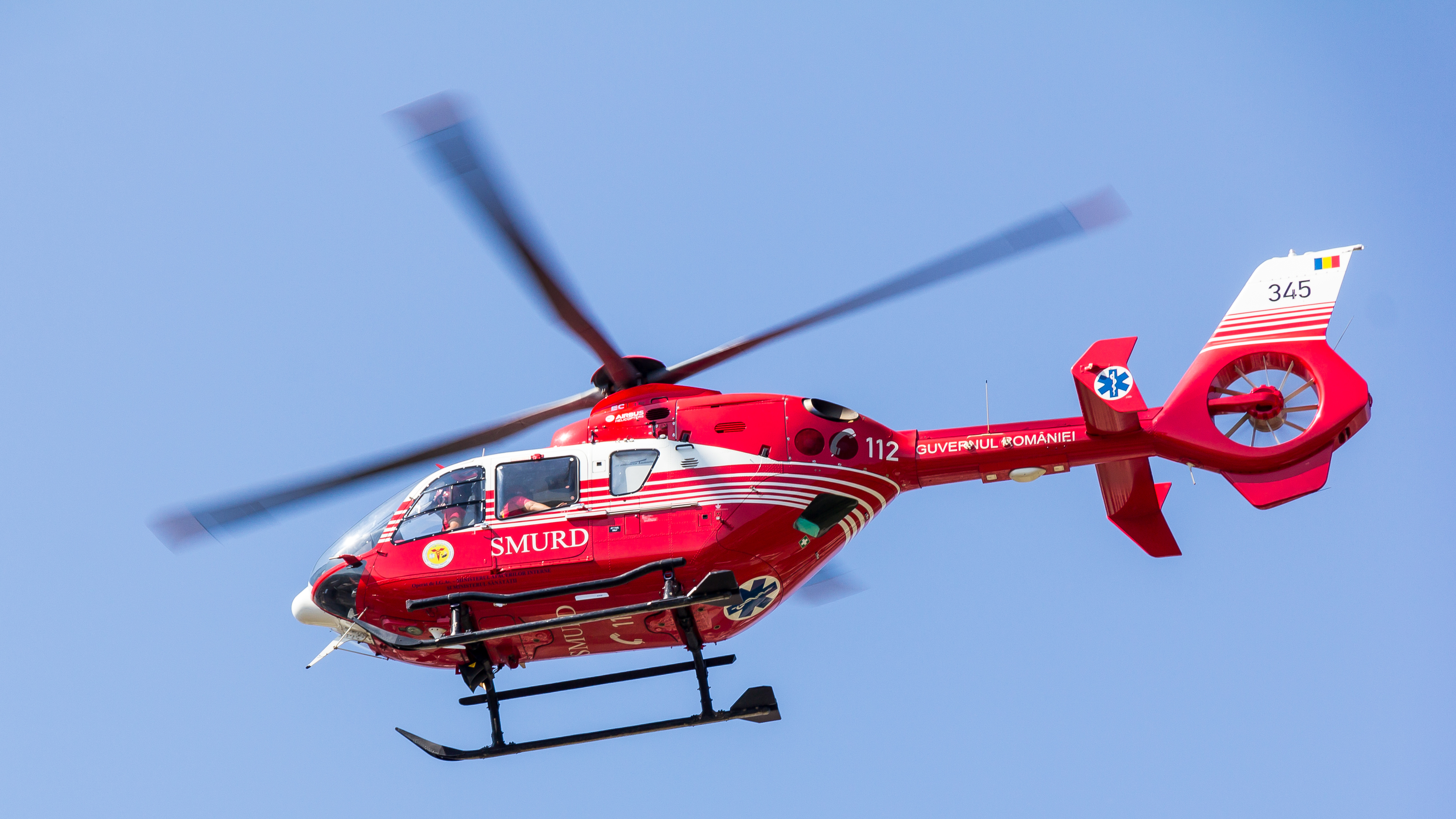
SMURD helicopter

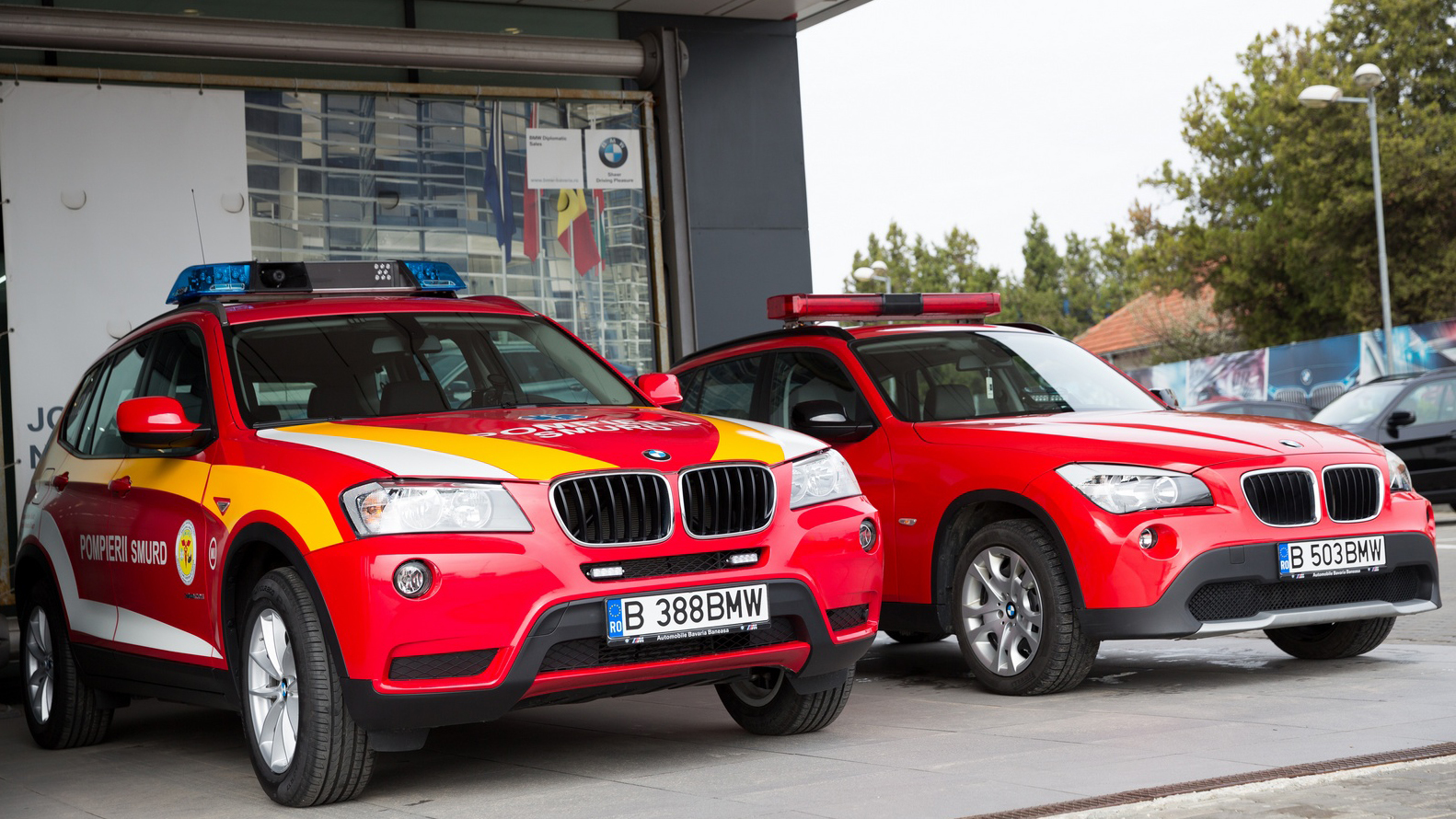
SMURD ambulances (I)

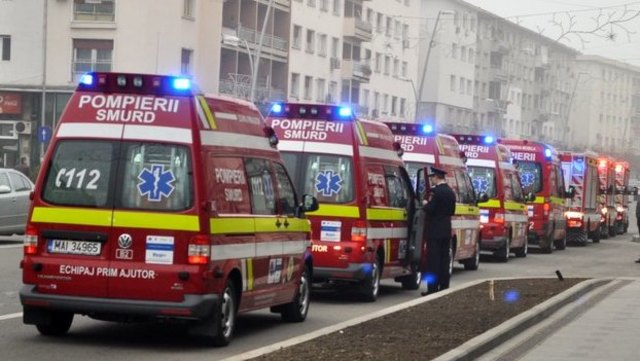
SMURD ambulances (II)

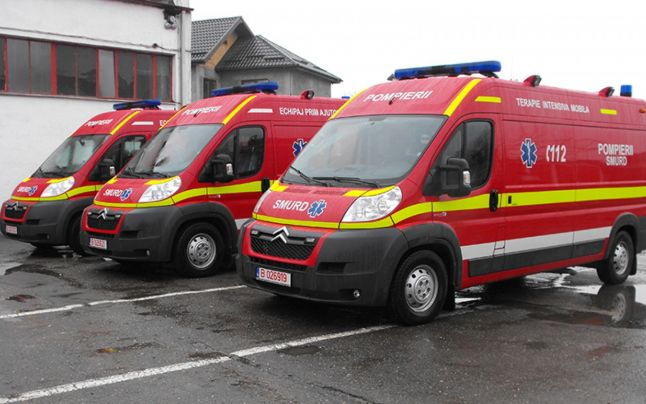
SMURD ambulances (III)

With the guidance of the Anaesthesiology and Intensive Care Clinic, in September 1990, an emergency system functional in other European countries was experimented. This system was based on the transfer of a full-equipped medical unit to the site where the critical patient was, in order to provide qualified emergency medical assistance. The unit is coordinated by a physician specialized in anaesthesiology, intensive care and emergency medicine. At this early stage, the new service, called SMUR or the Emergency and Resuscitation Mobile Service, was endowed with only one equipped intervention unit, which had no possibility of transporting the patient, the transport being left to be made by a vehicle belonging to the County Ambulance Service.

=== 1991 ===
In 1991, following the fall of Communism in Romania, SMUR received its first mobile resuscitation unit (donated from Germany). This unit brought a higher level of pre-hospital medical care, and easier one.

Until October 1990, the new system has functioned entirely based on volunteer work. The SMUR mobile unit's drivers were students at the Faculty of Medicine, physicians or Red Cross volunteers from Târgu Mureș. After failed attempts of cooperation with several institutions, in October 1991 an experimental period of time started, placing SMUR under the operative coordination of the Mureș Fire Department, which, at that time, was responsible for the employment of the drivers for the mobile unit, and to provide accommodation and training rooms for SMUR's medical staff. This experiment, which was to be a success and to become a permanent solution, was based on the models found in many countries in the world, where firemen are directly involved in providing of emergency medical assistance and first-aid. These models are functional in Germany, France, Luxembourg, the United States, Canada, Japan, etc. In this new functional structure, SMUR was guided by the Anaesthesiology and Intensive Care Clinic from the medical point of view and by the Fire Department from the operative point of view.

=== 1992 ===
In 1992, SMURD kept on progressing, concentrating on the training of the mostly volunteer personnel and on developing international relations with similar services from other countries. The first countries to establish a long term cooperation, even from 1992 were Great Britain and Norway. The Norwegian Red Cross from Sauda started their support by donating SMUR mobile units and emergency medical equipment and the Emergency Service of the Royal Hospital in Edinburgh and the Strathclyde Fire Brigade in Glasgow have started an intensive support program for the development of emergency medical assistance and for the training and endowment of firemen in new fields, such as extrication and chemical hazards. In November 1992, following a training period of 3 weeks, with trainers from Germany, the Netherlands, Scotland and the United States, an exercise was performed to which were invited to participate the representatives of several Ministries and institutions. Following this exercise, the Minister of Health declared, by the Decision No. 1094 of 5 November 1992, the new system functioning in Târgu Mureș as the National Pilot Centre. This new status was to protect the new model, in the years 1993–1997, against the high level of opposition and the attempts to shut it down. As part of the training in 1992, the first laboratory for emergency training was donated by the Foundation for Open Society, United States.

=== 1993 ===
In 1993, after SMUR had functioned for about two years providing emergency assistance in pre-hospital, a great development phase started in May, with the support of the colleagues at the Emergency Service of the Royal Hospital of Edinburgh. This development was the creation of the Intensive Care Room at the Mureș County Clinical Hospital, designed to continue the treatment of critical patients brought in by SMUR or arrived through other means, until their admission to the hospital's departments. The new Intensive Care Room staff members were the doctors, medical assistants and volunteers who worked in the pre-hospital emergency units. The new Intensive Care Room reduced the mortality within the Emergency Room of the Mureș County Hospital by approximately 50%.

Also in 1993, the Strathclyde Fire Brigade in Scotland has donated the first mobile extrication unit to the Mureș Fire Department, training the personnel within the Fire Department for the efficient and accurate use of the equipment. The first intervention the unit responded to took place in exactly the same day as the donation ceremony.

Starting 1993, the Resuscitation and Emergency Mobile Service (SMUR) has become the Emergency Mobile Service for Resuscitation and Extrication (SMURD). Also in 1993, the first services following the Târgu Mureș SMURD showed up at Oradea and Sibiu, adopting the functional mode of the Târgu Mureș system.

=== 1994 ===
1994 was a very important year in the history of the development of emergency medical assistance in Mureș County and perhaps in the whole country. With the help of the Emergency Service of Edinburgh and of the London BBC, the first Emergency Department was built, following the models in Great Britain and the United States. The new department or "Emergency Service" was placed in the yard of the Mureș County Clinical Hospital and started its activity on 31 July 1994. Building this Emergency Service took almost a month and gathered many working people, from Scotland and Târgu Mureș, from the Army, the Gendarmerie and the Fire Department, and from organizations and volunteers, all wanting to see the new service working as soon as possible.

From the Fire Department point of view, 1994 has brought a new activity. The Scotland firemen endowed and trained the Mureș firemen for chemical hazard interventions, creating the first operative unit of this kind in all the Fire Departments of Romania. Alongside the firemen, doctors from SMURD attended the training programs.

=== 1995–1996 ===
In 1995 and 1996 the system continued its development, especially in the field of training and professional growth of physicians and medical assistants coming from all corners of the country. In 1997 alone in Târgu Mureș approximately 250 doctors, medical assistants and firemen were trained, and in 1998 this number surpassed 300.

In October 1996, the Military Fire Corps Law no. 121 was promulgated by the President. For the first time in Romania, in this law at articles 9 and 18.k it was established that Military Firemen have a duty to provide emergency medical assistance and extrication. This law has put the system within legal boundaries after an experimentation period of approximately 5 years. Consequently, the Emergency Mobile Service for Resuscitation and Extrication was named the Intervention Station for Emergency Medical Assistance and Extrication (SIAMUD). In Mureș County, currently both names are in use, SMURD or SIAMUD.

=== 1997 ===
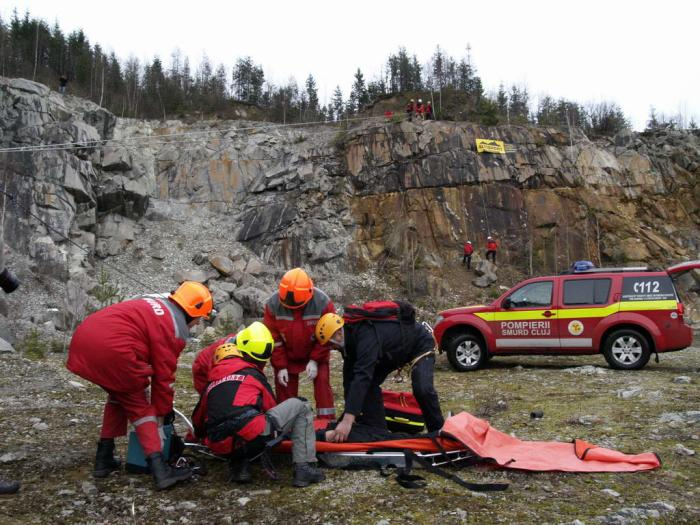
SMURD in action

In 1997 and following a series of intensive training programs in the field of catastrophe medicine with the help of colleagues in France, the Fast Response Group was created; it includes a number of 25 people wearing pagers which allow their calling in at any time in case of serious accidents. In 1998 this group was called in for the intervention on multiple victims accidents. The training in this area is continued with the help of the French Embassy in Bucharest, which is financing an annual training program in catastrophe medicine. Also in 1997 a new joined dispatch was founded, working for both the County Ambulance Service and SMURD. It is located within the Emergency Department and is staffed by County Ambulance Service personnel with the support from SMURD.

=== 1998 ===
1998 was a very special year for SMURD Târgu Mureș. In June that year, the Fire Department received an intervention boat necessary for the drowning cases in the Mureș River. Only in August the same year, the Firemen and SMURD had 6 interventions using that boat.

In June 1998 a public fund-raising was organized, destined to raise funds for purchasing a new, fully equipped mobile intensive care unit. This fund-raising continued until December 1998 and was finalized with the acquisition of the most modern intensive care unit in Romania, for the price of DEM 183,000, fully equipped by Miesen, Germany. The entire amount collected was donated by the people and the companies in Mureș County. The success of this project was and still is a measure of the community's perception of the SMURD activity.

== Today ==
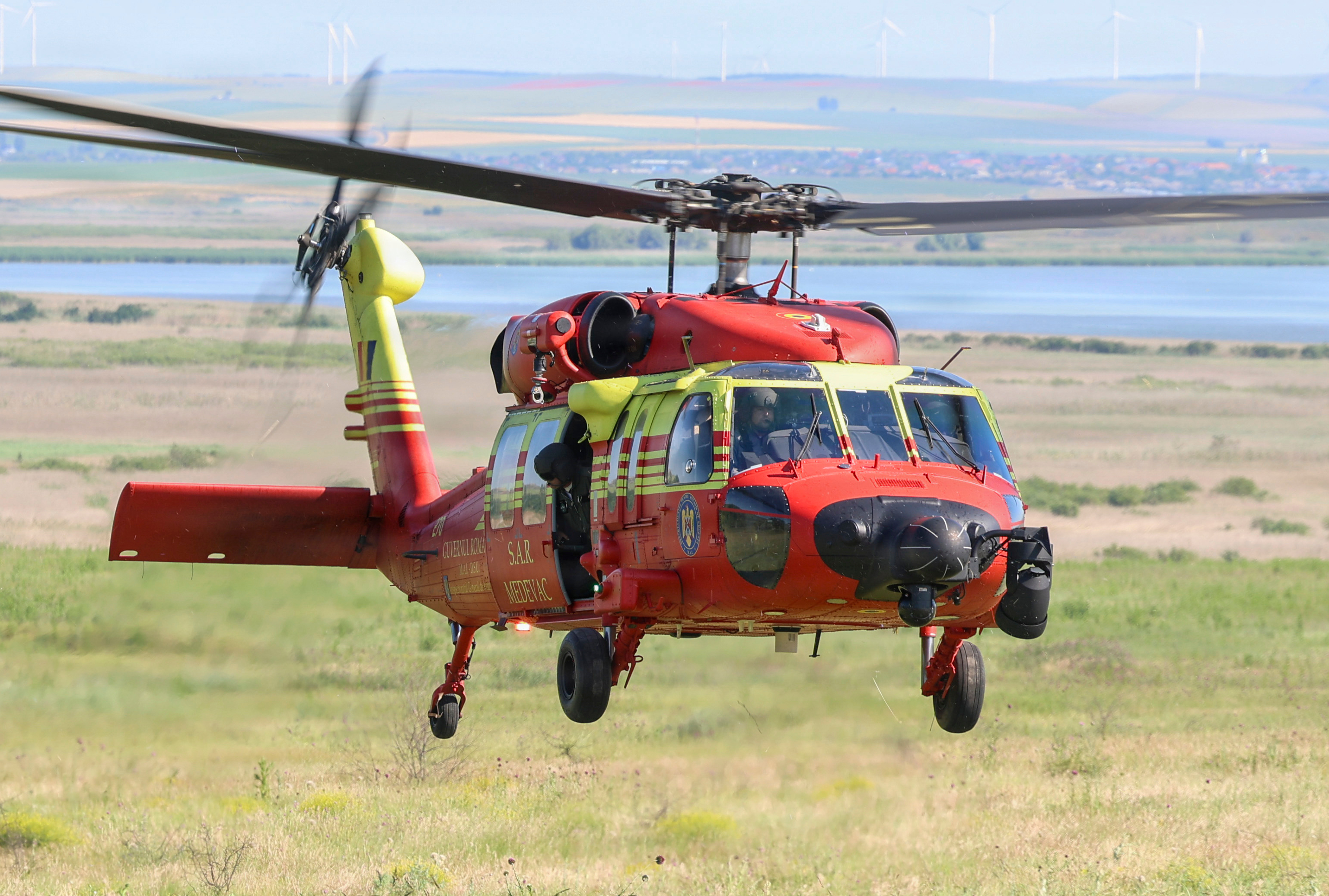
S-70M Black Hawk used by SMURD

Starting with 2007 the service has been expanding step by step to cover the whole of Romania. As of today, the service is active on the entire national territory (together with the regular Ambulance Service). Every department now has its own SMURD service managed by the firefighting county services, integrated with the Ambulance County Services and other emergency services thanks to new integrated "112" dispatch county stations.

As of today, there are 9 HEMS operating bases:

- Bucharest
- Târgu Mureș
- Iași
- Arad
- Craiova
- Brașov
- Constanța
- Galați
- Jibou

All the HEMS bases are equipped with Eurocopter EC-135 helicopters. Other projects are the implementation of the Telemedicine system (already available in many regions) and an emergency airplane for long-distance patient transport.

On 2 June 2016, a SMURD helicopter crashed near Haragîș in south-west Moldova, near the Romanian border, killing all four crew members on board.

== See also ==
- General Inspectorate of Aviation - operates the SMURD aircraft
