= NMS Bucovina =

Austro-Hungarian then Romanian river monitor

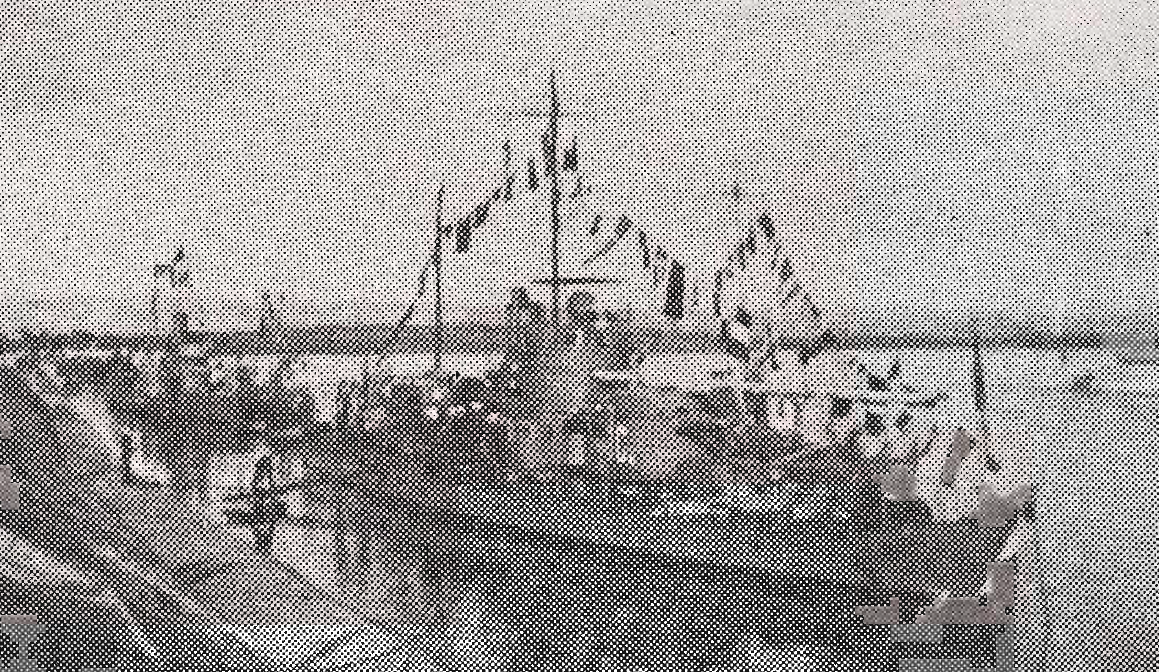
- NMS Bucovina (marked "Bc") in the interwar period

History

Austria-Hungary
- Name: Sava
- Namesake: Sava River
- Laid down: 1914
- Launched: 31 May 1915
- In service: 15 September 1915
- Out of service: 1918
- Fate: Taken over by the Kingdom of Serbs, Croats and Slovenes

Kingdom of Yugoslavia
- Name: Soča
- Namesake: Soča River
- Acquired: 31 December 1918
- Out of service: 15 April 1920
- Fate: Reassigned to the Kingdom of Romania

Kingdom of Romania
- Name: Bucovina
- Namesake: Bucovina
- Acquired: 15 April 1920
- Decommissioned: 1 December 1957
- Out of service: 18 September 1944
- Refit: 1936–1937; 1942–1943
- Stricken: 1958
- Reinstated: 12 August 1951
- Fate: Scrapped in 1959
- Notes: Confiscated by the USSR, returned in 1951, and continued service as M.12, later M.205, until 1958

Soviet Union
- Name: Izmail
- Namesake: Izmail
- Acquired: 18 September 1944
- Decommissioned: 28 February 1948
- Fate: Returned to Romania in 1951, scrapped 1959

General characteristics (initial configuration)
- Class & type: Sava-class river monitor
- Displacement: Standard: 580 tonnes (570 long tons); Full: 650 tonnes (640 long tons)
- Length: 62 m (203 ft 5 in)
- Beam: 10.3 m (33 ft 10 in)
- Draught: 1.3 m (4 ft 3 in)
- Installed power: 1,560 ihp (1,160 kW); 2 Yarrow boilers
- Propulsion: 2 vertical triple-expansion steam engines
- Speed: 13.5 knots (25.0 km/h; 15.5 mph)
- Range: 700 nmi (1,300 km; 810 mi) at 10 knots (19 km/h; 12 mph)
- Complement: 91 officers and enlisted
- Armament: 2 × 120 mm (4.7 in)/L45 gun; 2 × 120 mm (4.7 in)/L10 howitzer; 2 × 66 mm (2.6 in)/L26 BAK; 2 × 47 mm (1.9 in)/L44 guns; 7 × 8 mm (0.31 in)/Schwarzlose machine guns
- Armour: Belt and bulkheads: 40 mm (1.6 in); Deck: 25 mm (0.98 in); Conning tower: 50 mm (2.0 in); Gun turrets: 50 mm (2.0 in)

NMS Bucovina, named SMS Sava in Austro-Hungarian Navy service, was the lead ship of the Sava-class river monitors built by Stabilimento Tecnico Triestino of Linz between 1914 and 1915. She served in the Austro-Hungarian Danube Flotilla until 1918, and after a brief service in the Yugoslav Navy, she was assigned to the Romanian Navy. Serving with the Romanian Danube Flotilla in World War II, she ran aground near Ostrovul Ciocănești on 1 September 1944. She was recovered on 16 September and confiscated by the Soviets receiving the name Izmail. Returned to Romania in 1951, she was moved to reserve in 1957, then scrapped in 1959.

== Description and construction ==
As part of an Austro-Hungarian 1914–15 Naval Program, The SMS Sava, lead ship of the Sava-class river monitors, was laid down in 1914 at Stabilimento Tecnico Triestino in Linz together with her sister ship SMS Bosna. The Sava-class represented an improvement over the previous Enns-class.

Sava had a length of 62 m (203 ft 5 in), a width of 10.3 m (33 ft 10 in), and a draught of 1.3 m (4 ft 3 in) and was powered by two vertical triple-expansion steam engines supplied by two Yarrow boilers which produced 1,560 ihp (1,160 kW), providing the ship a speed of 13.5 knots (25.0 km/h; 15.5 mph) and a range of 700 nmi (1,300 km; 810 mi) at 10 knots (19 km/h; 12 mph), carrying 76 tons of fuel oil. Belt armor was 40 mm (1.6 in) thick, deck armor was 25 mm (0.98 in), and the conning tower and turrets had 50 mm (2.0 in). Armament consisted of two 120 mm (4.7 in)/L45 gun mounted in a twin turret and two 120 mm (4.7 in)/L10 howitzers. Anti-aircraft armament consisted of two 66 mm (2.6 in)/L26 BAK, (Note: BAK meaning Ballon-Abwehr Kanone or anti-balloon cannon) two 47 mm (1.9 in)/L44 guns and seven Schwarzlose machine guns.

Compared to the Enns-class, Sava had a reduced ship profile to aid in camouflaging. The superstructure was narrowed and shortened to present a smaller target, as were the funnel and the mast. The reserve command was also moved to the stern, and better compartmentalization was tried.

== Service history ==
=== World War I ===
SMS Sava was launched on 31 May 1915 and entered service with the Austro-Hungarian Danube Flotilla on 15 September. She then took part in the operations around Belgrade with Körös, and Leitha. On 7 October 1915, the monitor group was replaced by Enns, Inn, and Temes. On 16 October, Sava was transferred to Pančevo. She then moved to Budapest and spent the winter there.

In 1916, Sava was stationed at Ruse with four other monitors and four patrol boats. After the attack on 27/28 August, Sava and Temes (II) (Bosna) escorted the auxiliary ships to the Belene Island. In September, Sava bombarded the port and railway station of Calafat along with Inn and several other patrol boats, capturing four barges in the engagement. Returning to Belene, the monitors were attacked by Romanian aviation and artillery from Zimnicea until 25 September and had to relocate further upstream. Forming the 2nd Monitor Group with Inn and patrol boat Csucka, Sava fought in the Battle of Cinghinarele Island and landed troops that captured the island. In October, Sava continued raiding other Romanian positions on the river, and helped clear out the Dinu Island in November. Further raids continued in November targeting Giurgiu. Sava with the other Austro-Hungarian monitors were stationed in Turnu Severin and Budapest for the winter, returning to the front in March 1917.

Throughout May 1917, Sava was attacked by the Russian aviation. She was then moved to Brăila as to avoid the Romanian artillery fire from the batteries mounted in Galați. In 1918, Sava remained to guard the Danube at Brăila while a monitor group was dispatched to Odesa. The worsening of the situation in the Balkans caused the River Flotilla to be rearranged. Sava was thus moved to Sulina. On 19 October, she was ordered to retreat to Severin. On 22 October, Sava and the ships Barsch and Una were engaged by the French artillery which had reached Lom-Palank and Vidin. Reaching Turnu Severin, the ships continued to Novi Sad and then to Budapest reaching the city on 6 November. On 8 December 1918, the ships from Budapest were confiscated by the Allied Commission for the British Danube Flotilla. Sava was moved to Belgrade for repairs, where she was taken by the Kingdom of Serbs, Croats and Slovenes on 31 December and placed in service with the name Soča.

On 15 April 1920, the monitor was reassigned to Romania and received the name Bucovina after one of the provinces that united into Greater Romania. She was assigned to the Romanian Danube Flotilla in December 1920.

=== Interwar to World War II ===
Between 1936 and 1937, Bucovina went through an extensive modernization process. The superstructure was enlarged, and the howitzers and light guns were dismounted and replaced with three 37 mm (1.5 in) SK C/30 installed on the upper deck, two 20 mm (0.79 in) C38 on the sides of the upper deck, and a 13.2 mm (0.52 in) Hotchkiss heavy machine gun on a platform behind the superstructure. Four of the original seven machine guns were kept.

At the start of Romania's campaign of World War II, Bucovina together with Ardeal and one other monitor and two gunboats were organized in the Galați River Naval Force of the Romanian Danube Flotilla. Their task was to protect the flank of Romanian Fourth Army and conduct counter-battery fire against the Soviet artillery and monitors located in Giurgiulești and Reni. Artillery duels with the Soviet Danube Flotilla and Soviet artillery started on 23 June 1941 and continued until the night of 9/10 July when the Soviet ships retreated to Izmail. After the Soviet ships left the Chilia arm of the Danube, Bucovina was assigned to the Vâlcov Tactical Detachment until 1942, when she was brought to the Galați shipyard for repairs and upgrades.

Between 1942 and 1943, the monitor received a second twin turret with of 120 mm (4.7 in)/L45 guns which was taken from NMS Basarabia, the deck armor was increased to 60 mm (2.4 in) and two quadruple 20 mm (0.79 in) Flakvierling 38 guns were installed on the roof of each main turret. As a result of these changes, the displacement increased to 640 tonnes (630 long tons) standard and 770 tonnes (760 long tons) full, the draught increased to 1.56 m (5 ft 1 in) and the speed decreased to 12 knots (22 km/h; 14 mph). The complement was also increased to 125 crewmen. After the upgrade works were completed, the ship returned to the Vâlcov Tactical Detachment and carried out the missions in rotations.

On 23 August 1944, Bucovina was stationed on the Vâlciu branch, upstream of Brăila. Moving to Hârșova after the King Michael's coup, the ship joined the 3rd River Group which consisted of monitors Ardeal, Lahovary, and was led by Basarabia. Under the command of Captain Dumitru Comănescu, Bucovina departed for Giurgiu with the mission of preventing German troops from crossing the Danube from Bulgaria and capturing or destroying any encountered German ships on the night of 26/27 August. Together with Basarabia, she captured 76 ships on the Măcin/Old Danube arm. The two monitors continued towards Cernavodă and captured a medical convoy on the way there. On 29 August, the ships were further instructed to move to Turnu Măgurele. The ships reached Giurgiu on 30 August. On 31 August, the ships were called to Brăila then to Reni. Beginning the journey, Bucovina captured an armed barge which was handed over at Zimnicea. On 1 September, Basarabia reached Bucovina and both departed to Brăila. The same day, Bucovina ran aground near Ostrovul Ciocănești and was unable to free herself. The next day, Basarabia returned with the tugboat Basarab and attempted to aid Bucovina. Unsuccessful in their attempts, the two ships departed for Călărași, leaving Bucovina and some Soviet officers and sailors who boarded her to continue the efforts alone. The crews succeeded in freeing Bucovina on 16 September. The ship was then towed to Brăila, then to Izmail where the Soviets confiscated her on 18 September. On 30 October, the ship was pressed into Soviet service as Izmail.

=== Post-war ===
The armament of Izmail was changed while in Soviet service. In this sense, five 37 mm (1.5 in)/63 70-K guns, two 20 mm (0.79 in)/Oerlikon Mk4 cannons, four DShK heavy machine guns, and four SG-43 Goryunov machine guns were installed. The ship was also modified to accommodate a landing party of 50 soldiers.

On 28 February 1948, she was placed in reserve and mothballed at Kyslytsia. She was returned to Romania in July 1951, after being removed from service a month earlier. On 12 August 1951, she reentered Romanian service receiving the designation M.12, which was changed a year later to M.205. On 1 December 1957, she was moved to reserve, then stricken in 1958 and finally scrapped in 1959.

== Bibliography ==
- Kálmán, Hardy (1931). "Dunai flottillánk a világháborúban". Hadtörténelmi Közlemények (PDF) (in Hungarian). Vol. 32.
