= NMS Basarabia =

Austro-Hungarian WWI river monitor later used by Romania

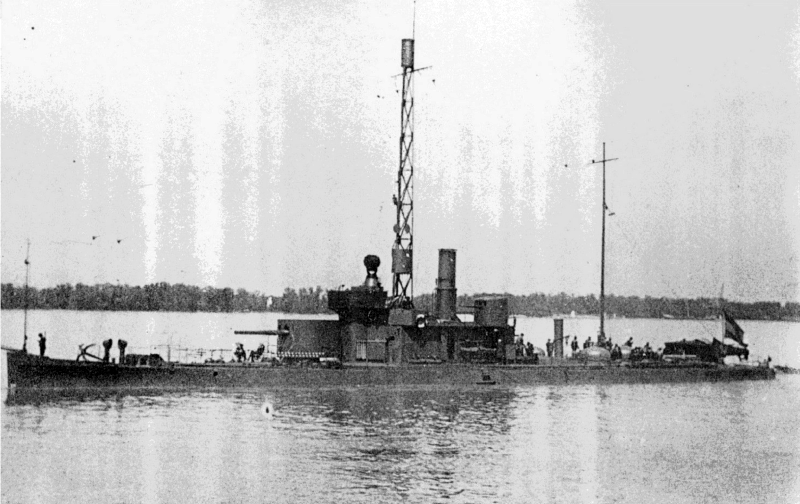
- SMS Inn, before 1917

History

Austria-Hungary
- Name: Inn
- Namesake: Inn River
- Builder: Ganz-Danubius, Budapest
- Laid down: November 1913
- Launched: 25 February 1915
- In service: 11 April 1915
- Out of service: 6 November 1918
- Fate: Transferred to the Hungarian People's Republic
- Notes: Sunk by Romanian mine in September 1917, refloated between October and November 1917 and repaired

Hungarian People's Republic
- Name: Újvidék
- Namesake: Újvidék
- Acquired: 6 November 1918
- Out of service: 15 April 1920
- Fate: Assigned to the Kingdom of Romania
- Notes: Named Marx between July and August 1919 while serving the Hungarian Soviet Republic

Kingdom of Romania
- Name: Basarabia
- Namesake: Basarabia
- Acquired: 15 April 1920
- Decommissioned: 1958
- Out of service: 5 September 1944
- Refit: 1937–1939; 1940–1942
- Reinstated: 12 August 1951
- Fate: Scrapped in 1960
- Notes: Confiscated by the USSR, returned in 1951 and continued service as M.11, later M.206, until 1958

Soviet Union
- Name: Kerch
- Namesake: Kerch
- Acquired: 2 September 1944
- Decommissioned: 28 February 1948
- Fate: Returned to Romania in 1951, scrapped 1960

General characteristics (initial configuration)
- Class & type: Enns-class river monitor
- Displacement: Standard: 536 tonnes (528 long tons); Full: 600 tonnes (590 long tons)
- Length: 57.9 m (190 ft 0 in)
- Beam: 10.3 m (33 ft 10 in)
- Draught: 1.3 m (4 ft 3 in)
- Installed power: 1,560 ihp (1,160 kW); 2 Yarrow boilers
- Propulsion: 2 triple-expansion steam engines
- Speed: 13.5 knots (25.0 km/h; 15.5 mph)
- Range: 700 nmi (1,300 km; 810 mi) at 10 knots (19 km/h; 12 mph)
- Complement: 95 officers and enlisted
- Armament: 2 × 120 mm (4.7 in) L/45 guns; 3 × 120 mm (4.7 in) L/10 howitzers; 2 × 66 mm (2.6 in) L/50 BAG guns; 6 × 8 mm (0.31 in) Schwarzlose machine guns
- Armour: Belt and bulkheads: 40 mm (1.6 in); Deck: 25 mm (0.98 in); Conning tower: 50 mm (2.0 in); Gun turrets: 50 mm (2.0 in)

NMS Basarabia, originally named SMS Inn, was an Enns-class river monitor built by Ganz-Danubius in Budapest between 1913 and 1915. While in Austro-Hungarian Navy service, she fought in World War I, but struck a Romanian mine and sank in 1917. She was then refloated and repaired, and entered Hungarian service until being captured and then transferred to the Romanian Navy as war reparations. She continued service with Romania until 1944 when she was taken by the Soviet Union. In 1951, she was returned to Romania and continued service until 1958. She was scrapped in 1960.

== Description and construction ==
The Enns-class monitors were designed as a development of the previous Temes-class under a 1912 Austro-Hungarian Naval Program. SMS Inn and her sister ship SMS Enns were laid down in November 1913, with Enns constructed by Schiffswerft Linz in Linz (Austria) and Inn constructed by Ganz-Danubius in Budapest (Hungary). This arrangement of splitting warship construction between the Austrian half and Hungarian half of the empire was done for political compromise reasons and was common practice.

Similar to her sister ship, Inn had a length of 57.9 m (190 ft 0 in), a width of 10.3 m (33 ft 10 in), and a draught of 1.3 m (4 ft 3 in). Her armor was 40 mm (1.6 in) for the belt, 50 mm (2.0 in) for the conning tower and turrets, and 25 mm (0.98 in) for the deck. Propulsion consisted of two triple-expansion steam engines supplied by two Yarrow boilers which produced 1,560 ihp (1,160 kW). The engines used fuel oil and provided a range of 700 nmi (1,300 km; 810 mi) at 10 knots (19 km/h; 12 mph) with 76 tons of fuel carried.

Armament consisted of two 120 mm (4.7 in) L/45 guns mounted in a single turret in front of the ship, three aft mounted 120 mm (4.7 in) L/10 howitzers installed in three hemispherical domes with 50 mm (2.0 in) thick armor, and two 66 mm (2.6 in) L/50 BAG cannons located on the upper deck in semi-open turrets. Six Schwarzlose machine guns were also installed.

Unlike her sister ship, Inn had a different hull design as she was intended to serve as a command ship. As such, additional cabins for staff officers were added. As the Budapest shipyard was busy converting civilian ships for military use, construction proceeded slowly and was completed on 25 February 1915, the ship entering service on 11 April of the same year.

== Service ==
=== World War I ===
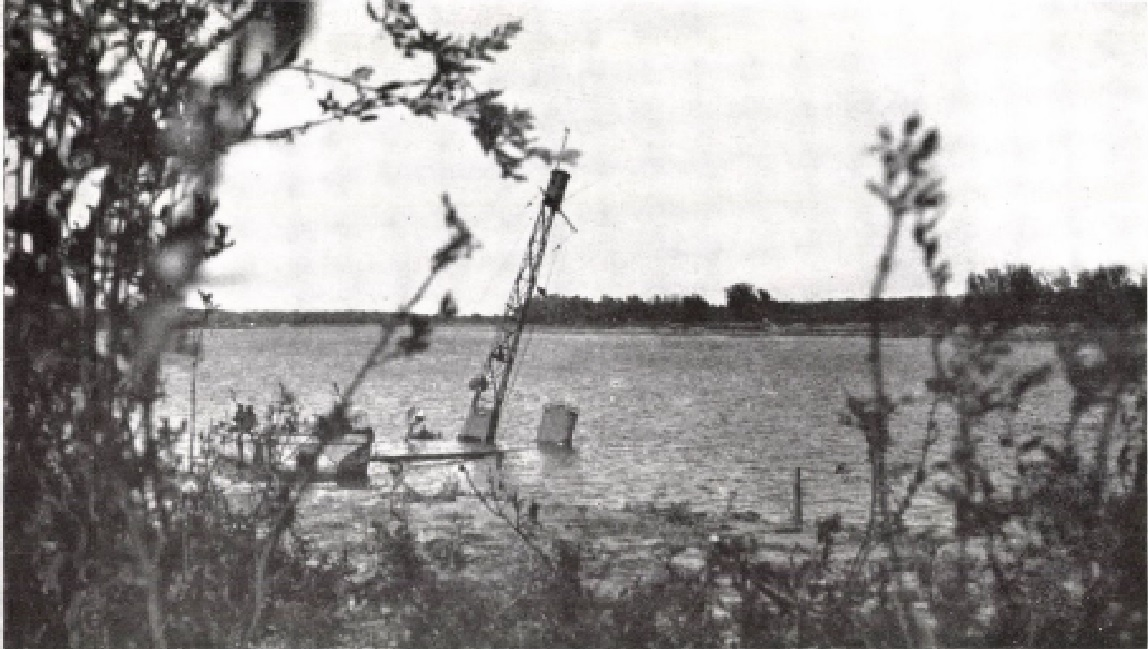
The wreck of SMS Inn in 1917

After the ship was assigned to the Austro-Hungarian Danube Flotilla, her first deployment was at Belgrade on 7 October 1915 when, together with Temes and Enns, she replaced the monitors Sava, Körös, and Leitha. The group managed to silence the Serbian artillery battery from Vračar. The monitors returned to their base in the evening of the same day.

After the Fall of Belgrade, Inn moved to Zemun forming the first monitor division with Bodrog and Maros. Following Romania's entry into the war, Inn and Sava participated in the Battle of Cinghinarele Island, aiding the German units in the bombardment and landed troops which captured the island. Continuing the campaign, Inn and Sava, along with the patrol boat Fogas and the armed steamers Helene and Vág secured the Danube crossing at Svishtov.

In September 1917, Inn participated in the reception of Kaiser Wilhelm II at Cernavodă. On 22 September 1917, while returning from Cernavodă, Inn broke off from the monitor formation to investigate a distress signal from a barge and struck a Romanian mine 14 km (8.7 mi) from Brăila. The explosion killed Korvettenkapitän Max von Förster, the Chief of Staff of the Austro-Hungarian Danube Flotilla. Another officer died in the explosion and eight other crewmen were injured. The salvage operation started immediately afterwards, the ship being refloated between 6 October and 28 November. She was towed to Budapest and repair works started at Ganz-Danubius on 18 February 1918. During the repairs, the hull was lengthened to 62 m (203 ft). By October 1918, she was still undergoing repairs in Budapest. Through a decision of the Allied Commission on 8 December, she was to be confiscated and enter service with the newly created British Danube Flotilla. While still under repair, she was transferred to the Hungarian People's Republic and renamed Újvidék. She was then taken by the Hungarian Soviet Republic and relaunched with the name Marx.

On 6 August 1919, she was captured by the Romanian Army after the Hungarian–Romanian War. In November, she was towed to Novi Sad and interned by the Kingdom of Serbs, Croats and Slovenes. On 15 April 1920, Inn was transferred to Romania after the final decision for the distribution of the Austro-Hungarian river monitors was taken by the Naval Allied Commission for Disposal of Enemy Vessels (NACDEV). She was renamed to NMS Basarabia after the province Bessarabia which united into Greater Romania. The other two monitors transferred to Romania received similar names: NMS Ardeal (ex-SMS Temes) and NMS Bucovina (ex-SMS Sava).

=== Interwar and World War II ===
On 9 December 1920, Basarabia was assigned to the Danube Division of the Romanian Navy. While in Romanian service, the ship went through a series of modifications. Between 1937 and 1939, she received new anti-aircraft armament: one 37 mm (1.5 in) SK C/30, two 20 mm (0.79 in) C38 guns, and one 13.2 mm (0.52 in) Hotchkiss heavy machine gun.

At the beginning of the Romanian campaign in World War II, Basarabia was in Galați, undergoing modernization works at the Galați shipyard. The extensive upgrade works were completed in 1942. These upgrades included replacing the previous heavy armament with four 120 mm (4.7 in) L/50 Škoda-Bofors Mk.4 cannons mounted in two twin square turrets, the displacement was increased to 641 tonnes (631 long tons) standard and 770 tonnes (760 long tons) full, the draught increased to 1.56 m (5 ft 1 in), and the complement was also increased to 133 crew. As a result of these changes, the maximum speed decreased to 12.2 knots (22.6 km/h; 14.0 mph).

After reentering active service, Basarabia was assigned to the Vâlcov Tactical Detachment which maintained control over the Black Sea access point to the Chilia arm of the Danube. At the time of the 23 August 1944 coup, the monitor was stationed on the Valciu branch repairing some problems with the wireless telegraphy station. Shortly after, the monitors were called to Hârșova where the 3rd River Group was established. Under the command of Lieutenant-Commander Eustațiu Nicolau, Basarabia led the group of monitors comprising Ardeal, Bucovina, and Lahovary. Tasked with preventing German troops from crossing the Danube from Bulgaria and capturing or destroying any German ships they encountered, the ships departed for Giurgiu on the night of 26/27 August with Basarabia and Bucovina sailing on the main course of the river, while the others took the Borcea branch. On 28 August, Basarabia and Bucovina entered the Măcin/Old Danube arm where they captured 76 ships: 14 tugboats, 60 barges, and two other ships. After disarming them, the ships were sent to Piua-Petrii with an escort.

Continuing to Cernavodă, the two monitors captured a medical convoy of one tugboat and three barges, one of which was transporting the wounded. On 29 August, the monitors were further ordered to move to the border with Yugoslavia and continued towards Turnu Măgurele. The monitors reached Giurgiu on 30 August. After resupplying, the monitors continued their march with the patrol ship MR 31. The group began tracking a convoy and was attacked by a German airplane which warned the convoy of their presence. After reaching Zimnicea, Basarabia captured another six boats which were then taken to Turnu Măgurele. On 31 August, the monitors were called to Brăila, then to Reni. On the way, Bucovina got stranded on a sand bank near Ostrovul Ciocănești on 1 September. Basarabia, having reached the Borcea branch, turned back to aid Bucovina together with the tugboat Basarab. Unsuccessful in getting Bucovina, the monitor departed for Călărași. On the way, Basarabia encountered two Soviet patrol boats and received orders to continue towards Isaccea. Moving to Izmail on 5 September, Basarabia was confiscated by the Soviets and pressed into service with the name Kerch on 30 October.

On 20 November, Kerch was brought to Galați along with Azov (ex-Brătianu). From there, the ships continued the campaign on the Danube as part of the Soviet Danube Flotilla. The two ships participated in the battles near the mouth of the Drava River and aided in the liberation of Vukovar and Osijek. The ships continued fighting as far as Budapest, and Kerch also took part in the Vienna offensive between April and March 1945.

=== Post-war ===
The German and French armament was removed while in Soviet service. These anti-aircraft guns were replaced with five 37 mm (1.5 in)/63 70-K installed on the upper deck and on the roof of the aft turret, two 20 mm (0.79 in)/Oerlikon Mk4 installed on the main deck, and four DShK heavy machine guns on the upper deck.

On 28 February 1948, she was placed in reserve and mothballed at Kyslytsia. She was removed from service in June 1951 and returned to Romania in July. Along with the other returned monitors, (Note: Mariupol (ex-Lahovary), Azov (ex-Brătianu), Izmail (ex-Bucovina), and Berdiansk (ex-Ardeal)) she entered service with the Romanian Danube Flotilla on 12 August 1951. She received the designation M.11, which was later changed to M.206 in 1952. She served until 1958, when she was moved to reserve. She was scrapped in 1960.

== Bibliography ==
- Kálmán, Hardy (1931). "Dunai flottillánk a világháborúban". Hadtörténelmi Közlemények (PDF) (in Hungarian). Vol. 32.
- Pawlik, Georg; Christ, Heinz; Winkler, Herbert (1989). Die K.u.K. Donauflottille 1870–1918 (in German). Graz: H. Weishaupt Verlag. ISBN 9783900310455.
