= Danube Flotilla =

The Danube Flotilla can refer to any of the following;

- Danube Flotilla (Austria-Hungary)
- Danube Flotilla (Czechoslovakia)
- Danube Flotilla (Hungary)
- Danube Flotilla (Romania)
- Danube Flotilla (Royal Navy)
- Danube Flotilla (Serbia)
- Danube Flotilla (Soviet Union)
- Danube Flotilla (Yugoslavia)
