= Danube station =

Danube station could refer to:

- Danube (Dubai Metro), a station on the Dubai Metro
- Danube station (Paris Metro), a station on the Paris Metro

== See also ==
- Danube Flotilla (Royal Navy)
