= NMS Ardeal =

Austro-Hungarian then Romanian river monitor

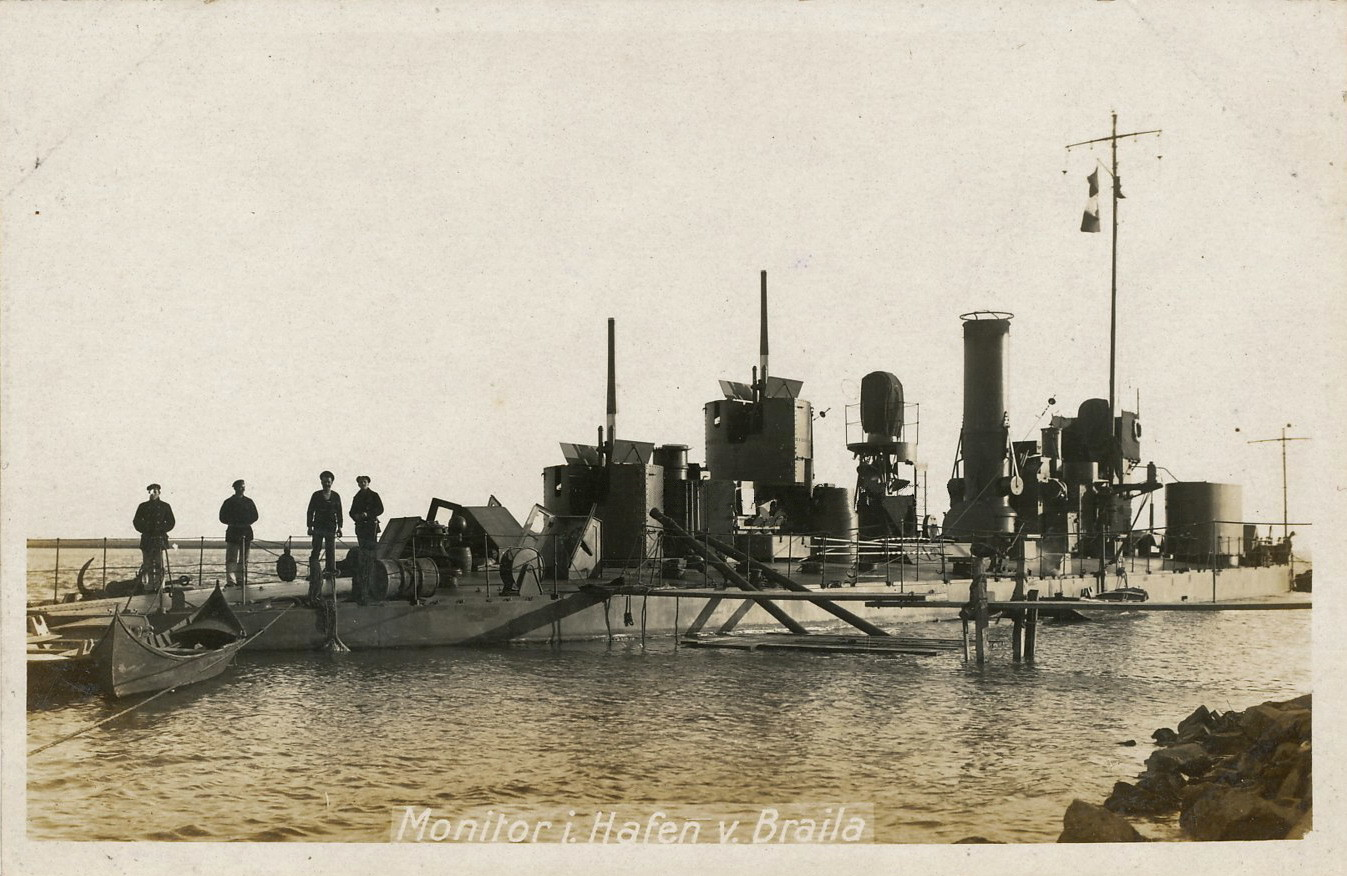
- SMS Temes at Brăila, c. 1917

History

Austria-Hungary
- Name: Temes
- Namesake: Temes River
- Builder: United Schoenichen-Hartmann Shipyard
- Launched: 26 March 1904
- In service: November 1904
- Out of service: 1918
- Fate: Taken over by the Kingdom of Serbs, Croats and Slovenes
- Notes: Sunk by Serbian mine in October 1914, refloated in June 1916

Kingdom of Yugoslavia
- Name: Drina
- Namesake: Drina River
- Acquired: 1918
- Out of service: 15 April 1920
- Fate: Reassigned to the Kingdom of Romania

Kingdom of Romania
- Name: Ardeal
- Namesake: Ardeal
- Acquired: 15 April 1920
- Decommissioned: 1957
- Out of service: 2 September 1944
- Refit: 1937–1940
- Reinstated: 12 August 1951
- Fate: Scrapped in 1959
- Notes: Confiscated by the USSR, returned in 1951 and continued service as M.20, later M.207, until 1957

Soviet Union
- Name: Berdiansk
- Namesake: Berdiansk
- Acquired: 2 September 1944
- Decommissioned: 28 February 1948
- Fate: Returned to Romania in 1951, scrapped 1959

General characteristics (initial configuration)
- Class & type: Temes-class river monitor
- Displacement: Standard: 442 tonnes (435 long tons); Full: 486 tonnes (478 long tons)
- Length: 57.7 m (189 ft 4 in)
- Beam: 9.5 m (31 ft 2 in)
- Draught: 1.2 m (3 ft 11 in)
- Installed power: 1,400 ihp (1,000 kW); 2 Yarrow water-tube boilers
- Propulsion: 2 triple-expansion steam engines
- Speed: 13 knots (24 km/h; 15 mph)
- Range: 500 nmi (930 km; 580 mi) at 9.5 knots (17.6 km/h; 10.9 mph)
- Complement: 89 officers and enlisted
- Armament: 2 × 120 mm (4.7 in)/L35 guns; 1 × 120 mm (4.7 in)/L10 howitzer; 2 × 37 mm (1.5 in)/L42 Vickers; 1 × 8 mm (0.31 in)/Škoda M1893
- Armour: Belt and bulkheads: 40 mm (1.6 in); Deck: 25 mm (0.98 in); Conning tower: 75 mm (3.0 in); Gun turrets: 40 mm (1.6 in)

NMS Ardeal was a Temes-class river monitor originally named SMS Temes while in Austro-Hungarian Navy service. Built in 1904, Temes was the lead ship of her class and served as flag ship of the Austro-Hungarian Danube Flotilla between 1908 and 1914. After a short service in the Yugoslav Navy, she was transferred to the Romanian Navy in 1920 and served with the Romanian Danube Flotilla in World War II until 1944 when she was taken over the Soviets. She was returned to Romania in 1951 and served as a training ship under the name M.20, later M.207, until 1959 when she was scrapped.

== Description and construction ==
At the turn of the 20th century, the Austro-Hungarian Danube Flotilla was the strongest force on the river, however, growing concerns over Russia threatening the control over the mouths of the Danube led Austria-Hungary to further increase its river capabilities. In this sense, an order was given for building two twin-turreted river monitors. Based on the lessons learned in previous designs, the two ships had to be capable of covering a 270° arc with their turrets, have light armament to defend against small arms fire from shore, and needed to have a very shallow draught. The design of the new vessels was entrusted to naval engineer Josef Thiel.

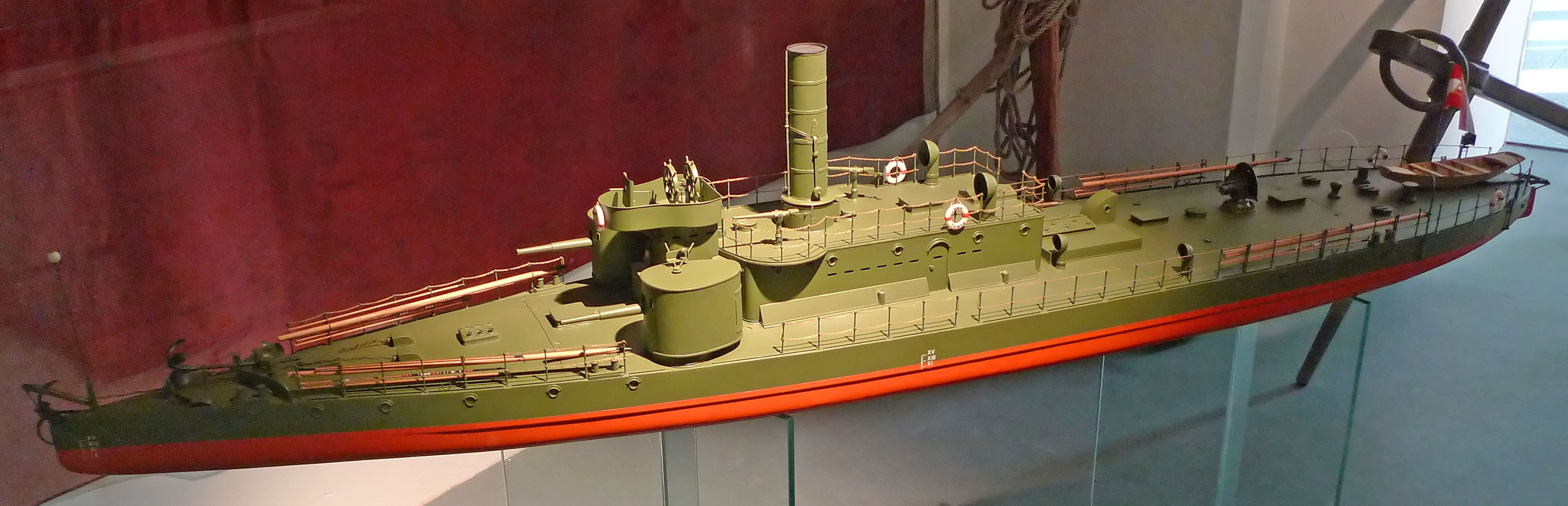
Scale model of SMS Temes in the pre-1914 configuration

Temes and her sister ship Bodrog were built by the Danubius Schönichen-Hartman Shipyards in Budapest between 1902 and 1904. The lead ship of her class, Temes was launched on 26 March 1904 and commissioned in November 1904. Like her sister ship, Temes featured a 40 mm (1.6 in) thick belt armor, with 75 mm (3.0 in) for the conning tower, 40 mm (1.6 in) for the main turrets and 25 mm (0.98 in) for the deck. Propulsion was ensured by two triple-expansion steam enginess generating 1,400 ihp (1,000 kW) which controlled two propellers and were powered by two Yarrow water-tube boilers giving the ship a maximum speed of 13 knots (24 km/h; 15 mph) and a range of 500 nmi (930 km; 580 mi) at a speed of 9.5 knots (17.6 km/h; 10.9 mph).

The original armament configuration consisted of two Škoda 120 mm (4.7 in)/L35 guns located in the forward section mounted on each side of the main deck and a 120 mm (4.7 in)/L10 howitzer located in the aft section mounted on a central pivot mount and fitted with a gun shield. Light armament consisted of two quick-firing 37 mm (1.5 in)/L42 Vickers (British QF 1-pounder pom-pom guns) placed in the forward and aft sections on each side of the upper deck. A single 8 mm (0.31 in) Škoda M1893 protected by a gun shield was also mounted. By 1910, the 37 mm (1.5 in) Vickers were replaced with the 66 mm (2.6 in)/L18 gun mounted on the upper deck.

== Service ==
=== World War I ===
Between 1908 and 1914, SMS Temes served as the flagship of the Austro-Hungarian Danube Flotilla. At the outbreak of World War I, Temes was stationed at Zemun along with Bodrog, Szamos, and Körös. Together with the other ships, Temes participated in the Bombardment of Belgrade. On 8 September 1914, the monitors repelled a Serbian attempt to cross the Danube, however the Austro-Hungarian troops were forced to evacuate the city to avoid encirclement. In the following days, the Sava monitor group under the command of Linienschiffsleutnant Olaf Richard Wulff supported the Krauss Division during the Srem Offensive. The group again prevented the crossing of the Serbian troops which threatened Zemun on 28 September. While on a nighttime reconnaissance mission on the Sava River on 22/23 October, Temes struck a Serbian mine and sunk with the loss of 31-33 of her crewmen. The survivors were rescued by the patrol boat Patrouillenboot B.

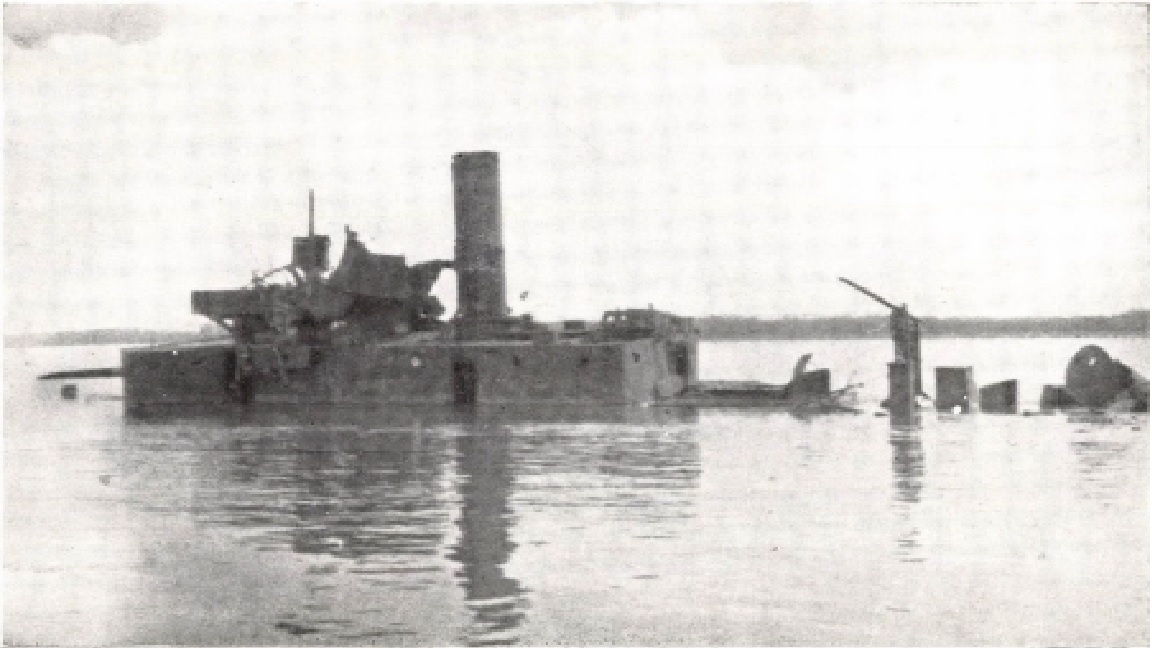
The wreck of SMS Temes before being raised

On 27 June 1916, Temes was raised and moved to Budapest for repairs. While in Budapest, the ship also received modifications to her armament: the 120 mm howitzer and the 66 mm gun were removed and replaced with two 90 mm (3.5 in)/L45 TAG/BAG guns (Note: TAG meaning Torpedoboot-Abwehr Geschütz or anti-torpedo boat gun, BAG meaning Ballon-Abwehr Geschütz or anti-balloon gun) mounted in the aft section and two 47 mm (1.9 in)/L44 guns mounted on the upper deck. The works were completed in 1917 and the ship was reassigned to the flotilla. As a result of this, the monitor SMS Bosna which had been renamed to Temes (II) had to switch back to her former name.

In the summer of 1917, the monitor departed for Brăila, arriving to the destination on 30 June. With her base in Brăila, the monitor aided two Austro-Hungarian pioneer platoons against the Russian forces. The monitor remained stationed in Brăila until October 1918 when the retreat of the flotilla towards Turnu Severin began. The flotilla reached Budapest in November where Hungarian officers and sailors replaced all non-Hungarian crews. After the Armistice of Belgrade, the Austro-Hungarian monitors were seized by the Allies and towed to Novi Sad. Temes was assigned to the Kingdom of Serbs, Croats and Slovenes which placed her into service under the name Drina. Following the negotiations at Saint-Germain-en-Laye, the final decision for the distribution of the ex-Austro-Hungarian river monitors was taken by the Naval Allied Commission for Disposal of Enemy Vessels (NACDEV) and Temes was reassigned to Romania along with Inn and Sava on 15 April 1920. The three ships were named after the three new provinces which united into Greater Romania with Temes receiving the name Ardeal, Inn was named Basarabia and Sava was named Bucovina.

=== Interwar period to World War II ===
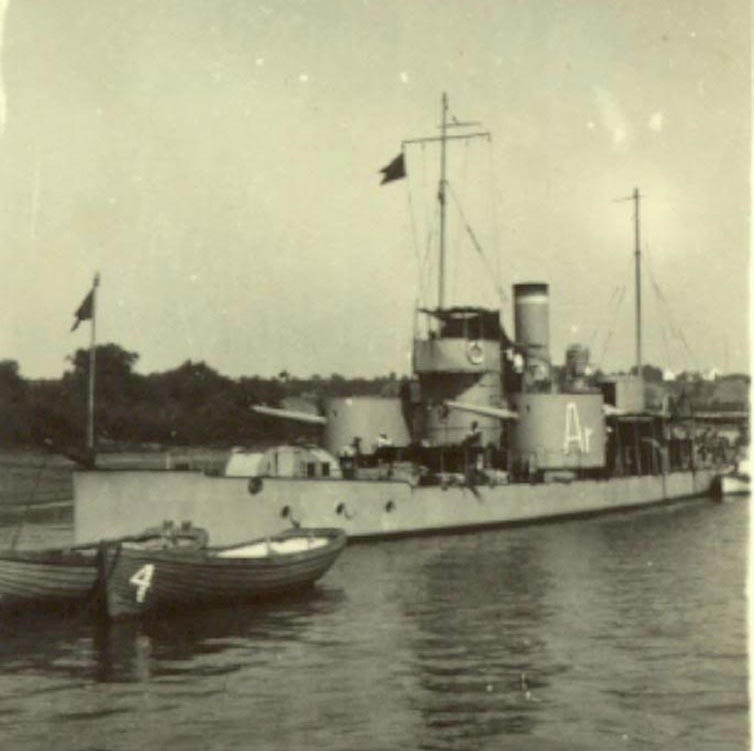
NMS Ardeal (marked "Ar") in the interwar period

While in Romanian service, the ship went through a series of modifications. In 1929, the two Škoda L35 guns were replaced with two 120 mm (4.7 in)/L50 Škoda-Bofors Mk.4 cannons. More substantial upgrades followed between 1937 and 1940: the armor was increased to 70 mm (2.8 in) for the belt and 40 mm (1.6 in) for the deck, the 90 mm (3.5 in) guns and the machine guns were dismounted and a third 120 mm (4.7 in) gun was installed in the aft section, thus matching the Brătianu class. Other installed weapons included two pivot-mounted Rheinmetall 20 mm (0.79 in) C/38 guns, a twin 13.2 mm (0.52 in) Hotchkiss heavy machine gun on the searchlight platform and two 37 mm (1.5 in) SK C/30 anti-aircraft guns, one placed on the upper deck in the forward section, the other placed in front of the aft-mounted 120 mm (4.7 in) gun. The complement was also increased to 129 crewmen. All the received upgrades decreased her maximum speed to 10 knots (19 km/h; 12 mph). While the other monitors were converted to oil fuel, Ardeal kept the coal propulsion so she could operate in the event of fuel shortage.

On 27 June 1940, after the Soviet ultimatum, Ardeal received the order to move to Reni and protect the evacuation operations from Bessarabia. The deployment ended on 30 June when the Soviets took control over the city and the ship was moved to Galați. In the spring of 1941, the monitor was moved to Orșova to ensure the protection of the river traffic from any Yugoslav attempt to block the river during the German invasion of Yugoslavia.

On 22 June 1941, NMS Ardeal along with three other monitors and two gunboats became part of the Galați River Naval Force within the Romanian Danube Flotilla. The task of the Naval Force was supporting the flank of Romanian Fourth Army and conducting counter-battery fire against the Soviet artillery and monitors located in Giurgiulești and Reni. At the start of Operation Barbarossa, Ardeal with another monitor and a gunboat occupied positions at the mouth of the Siret River. In the early morning of 22 June, as the German and Romanian batteries opened fire in the Giurgiulești-Reni sector, an aircraft was spotted flying at low altitude along the Danube and Ardeal engaged it with her heavy machine gun as instructed. It was later found out that it was a Romanian aircraft returning from an observation mission and that its observer had died of injuries suffered in the engagement. On the same day, Ardeal and Lahovary bombarded the Soviet artillery battery in Giurgiulești while guided by an airplane.

On 23 June, two Soviet monitors and two gunboats attempted to leave Reni and retreat to Izmail but were stopped by the Romanian monitors. Repeated attempts by the Soviet Danube Flotilla to reach Izmail followed and the battles with the Romanian monitors continued until the night of 9/10 July when the Soviet ships managed to sneak to Izmail. On 20 July, after the Soviet ships left the Chilia arm of the Danube, Ardeal and Brătianu formed the Vâlcov Tactical Detachment with the role of maintaining control over the Black Sea access point to the Chilia arm. While passing by Isaccea, Soviet airplanes tried to bomb the monitors but were forced to drop their bombs early and retreat by the anti-aircraft fire coming from the ships. The missions continued to be conducted in rotations until August 1944.

In early September 1941, Ardeal was damaged when a gunboat accidentally collided with her near Chilia. As a result, the monitor had to spend a few weeks for repairs at the Navy Arsenal. After the 23 August 1944 coup, the monitors were ordered to relocate to Giurgiu and prevent German soldiers from crossing the river as well as capture or destroy any retreating German ships. Organized in the 3rd River Group at Hârșova and commanded by Lieutenant-Commander Eustațiu Nicolau with Basarabia as the leading ship, Ardeal together with Bucovina and Lahovary departed for Giurgiu on the night of 26/27 August. The group was divided in two, Ardeal with Lahovary and the torpedo boat Sborul were to act on the Borcea branch while the other two monitors were to act on the main course of the Danube. On 28 August, Ardeal and Lahovary captured 7 ships and 19 barges on the Borcea branch. A day later, the monitors were ordered to move to the border with Yugoslavia and proceeded with their march towards Turnu Măgurele. On 30 August, the Ardeal group, which was moving at a lower speed due to boiler problems, was instead ordered to the Călărași-Oltenița area to prevent the withdrawal of German soldiers from Bulgaria.

On 31 August, the ships were called to Brăila then to Reni where the Soviets confiscated them on 2 September. On 30 October, Ardeal was pressed into Soviet service as Berdiansk and assigned to the 2nd Monitor Division of the 2nd Sulina River Ship Brigade within the Soviet Danube Flotilla. In November, Berdiansk was brought to Galați for repairs and then was transferred to the Soviet ports.

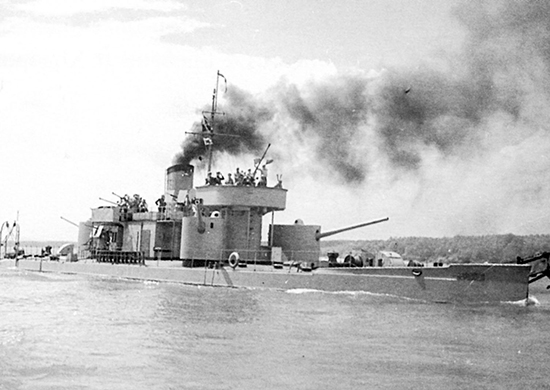
Soviet monitor Berdiansk after the war

=== Post-war ===
In Soviet service, the monitor received a few modifications. The deck armor was increased to 70 mm (2.8 in) above the machinery, while the light armament was replaced with four 37 mm (1.5 in)/63 70-K guns mounted on the upper deck and four 20 mm (0.79 in)/Oerlikon Mk4 cannons evenly divided between the upper and main decks.

On 28 February 1948, Berdiansk was mothballed and moved to Kyslytsia for lay-up a year later. The vessel was removed from Soviet service in June 1951 and returned to Romania in July. On 12 August 1951, Berdiansk (Ardeal) along with four other monitors, (Note: Mariupol (ex-Lahovary), Azov (ex-Brătianu), Izmail (ex-Bucovina), and Kerch (ex-Basarabia)) was brought back into Romanian service during a ceremony held in Galați. She received the designation M.20 and entered service as a training monitor. In 1952, the designation was changed to M.207. Service continued until 1957 when the ship was placed in reserve and later scrapped in 1959.

== Bibliography ==
- Kálmán, Hardy (1931). "Dunai flottillánk a világháborúban". Hadtörténelmi Közlemények (PDF) (in Hungarian). Vol. 32.
