= Yugoslav monitor Vardar =

Austro-Hungarian monitor ship

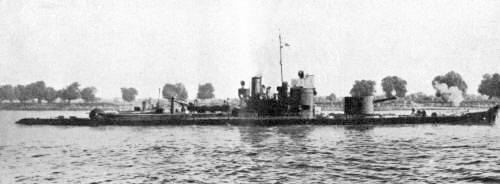
- Vardar underway in 1933

History

Austro-Hungarian Empire
- Name: Bosna/; Temes (II)/Bosna
- Namesake: Bosna River/Temes River
- Builder: Stabilimento Tecnico Triestino
- Laid down: 1914 (Linz)
- Launched: 1915
- In service: 9 July 1915
- Out of service: 6 November 1918
- Fate: Transferred to the Hungarian People's Republic
- Notes: Reverted to SMS Bosna on 9 May 1917 after the raising and repair of the original SMS Temes.; Sister ship Sava was ceded to Romania and renamed Bucovina.

Hungarian People's Republic
- Name: Bosna
- Namesake: Bosna River
- Acquired: 6 November 1918
- Out of service: 13 December 1918
- Fate: Assigned to the Kingdom of Serbs, Croats and Slovenes (KSCS)

Kingdom of Yugoslavia
- Name: Vardar
- Namesake: Vardar River
- Acquired: 1918
- In service: 1920
- Fate: Scuttled by her crew on 11/12 April 1941

General characteristics
- Class & type: Sava-class river monitor
- Displacement: 580 tonnes (570 long tons)
- Length: 62 m (203 ft 5 in)
- Beam: 10.3 m (33 ft 10 in)
- Draught: 1.3 m (4 ft 3 in)
- Installed power: 1,750 ihp (1,300 kW); 2 Yarrow boilers
- Propulsion: 2 Triple-expansion steam engines
- Speed: 13.5 knots (25.0 km/h; 15.5 mph)
- Complement: 91 officers and enlisted
- Armament: 2 × 120 mm (4.7 in) L/45 guns (1 × 2); 2 × 120 mm (4.7 in) L/10 howitzers (1 × 2); 2 × 66 mm (2.6 in) L/26 guns (1 × 2); 2 × 47 mm (1.9 in) L/44 guns; 7 × machine guns
- Armour: Belt and bulkheads: 40 mm (1.6 in); Deck: 25 mm (0.98 in); Conning tower, gun turrets and cupolas: 50 mm (2.0 in)

Vardar was a Sava-class river monitor built for the Austro-Hungarian Navy as SMS Bosna, but was renamed SMS Temes (II) before she went into service. During World War I, she was the flagship of the Danube Flotilla, and fought the Serbian Army, the Romanian Navy and Army, and the French Army. She reverted to the name Bosna in May 1917, after the original SMS Temes was raised and returned to service. After brief service with the Hungarian People's Republic at the end of the war, she was transferred to the newly created Kingdom of Serbs, Croats and Slovenes (later Yugoslavia), and renamed Vardar. She remained in service throughout the interwar period, although budget restrictions meant she was not always in full commission.

During the German-led Axis invasion of Yugoslavia in April 1941, she was the flagship of the 1st Monitor Division, and along with her fellow monitor Sava, she laid mines in the Danube near the Romanian border during the first few days of the invasion. The two monitors fought off several attacks by the Luftwaffe, but were forced to withdraw to Belgrade. Due to high river levels and low bridges, the monitors' navigation was difficult, and they were scuttled by their crews on 11 April. Some of her crew may have been killed when a demolished bridge collapsed onto a tugboat after they abandoned ship. Some tried to escape cross-country towards the southern Adriatic coast, but most surrendered to the Germans at Sarajevo on 14 April. The remainder made their way to the Bay of Kotor, where they were captured by the Italian XVII Corps on 17 April.

== Description and construction ==
Vardar was a Sava-class river monitor built for the Austro-Hungarian Navy by Stabilimento Tecnico Triestino, and was laid down as Bosna at Linz in 1914, as part of the Austro-Hungarian 1914–15 Naval Program. She was named after the river Bosna, but was renamed Temes (II) during construction, after the sinking of the original SMS Temes by a mine on the Sava River on 23 October 1914. Temes (II), like her sister ship Sava, had an overall length of 62 m (203 ft 5 in), a beam of 10.3 m (33 ft 10 in), and a normal draught of 1.3 m (4 ft 3 in). Her displacement was 580 tonnes (570 long tons), and her crew consisted of 91 officers and enlisted men. The ship was powered using steam generated by two Yarrow boilers driving two triple-expansion steam engines, and the ship carried 75 tonnes (74 long tons) of fuel oil. Its engines were rated at 1,750 ihp (1,300 kW) and she was designed to reach a top speed of 13.5 knots (25.0 km/h; 15.5 mph).

Her main armament was a twin gun turret of 120 mm (4.7 in) L/45 (Note: L/45 denotes the length of the gun. In this case, the L/45 gun is 45 calibre, meaning that the gun was 45 times as long as the diameter of its bore.) guns forward of the conning tower and a twin turret of 120 mm (4.7 in) L/10 howitzers aft of the conning tower. She also mounted twin 66 mm (2.6 in) L/26 anti-aircraft guns, two 47 mm (1.9 in) L/44 guns, and seven machine guns. The maximum range of her Škoda 120 mm (4.7 in)L/45 guns was 15 kilometres (9.3 mi), and her howitzers could fire their 20 kg (44 lb) shells a maximum of 6.2 km (3.9 mi). Her armour consisted of belt and bulkheads 40 mm (1.6 in) thick, deck armour 25 mm (0.98 in) thick, and her conning tower, gun turrets and cupolas were 50 mm (2.0 in) thick. Temes (II) was completed on 9 July 1915.

== Career ==
=== World War I ===
Temes (II) was commissioned into the Danube Flotilla in 1915, and was in action against the Serbian Army at Belgrade in early October, when the Serbs evacuated the city in the face of an Austro-Hungarian assault. During the final river crossing and reinforcement of the resulting bridgehead, Temes (II) provided close support. During this task, she attempted to draw fire away from the battle-damaged monitor Enns but after receiving a direct hit in the crew quarters aft, she had to move out of range. She was run ashore to put out fires and stop leaks, before being towed out of the battle area by an armed steamer, and taken to Budapest for repairs.

In November 1915, the other monitors were assembled at Rustschuk, Bulgaria. The geopolitical position of Romania was uncertain, with the Central Powers being aware that the Romanians were negotiating to enter the war on the side of the Entente. To protect the 480-kilometre (300 mi) Danubian border between Romania and Bulgaria, the flotilla established a sheltered base in the Belene Canal. When the Romanians entered the war on 27 August 1916, the monitors were again at Rustschuk, having been joined by Temes (II) after her repairs were completed. The monitors were immediately attacked by three improvised torpedo boats operating out of the Romanian river port of Giurgiu. The torpedoes that were fired missed the monitors, but struck a lighter loaded with fuel. The 1st Monitor Division, including Temes (II), was tasked with escorting supply ships back to the Belene anchorage. This was followed by forays of the Division both east and west of Belene, during which both Turnu Măgurele and Zimnicea were shelled. On 9 May 1917, she was renamed SMS Bosna as the original SMS Temes was due to return to service after a complete rebuild.

In April 1918, Bosna—along with three other monitors, two patrol boats and a tug—were formed into Flottenabteilung Wulff (Fleet Division Wulff) under the command of Flottenkapitän (Fleet Captain) Olav Wulff. Flottenabteilung Wulff was sent through the mouth of the Danube and across the Black Sea to Odessa, where it spent several months supporting the Austro-Hungarian troops enforcing the peace agreement with Russia. It returned to the Danube at the end of August, and was anchored at Brăila on 12 September. On 16 October, Bosna and the rest of the 1st Monitor Division sailed from Brăila to Belene. The Danube Flotilla then protected Austro-Hungarian troops withdrawing towards Budapest, fighting French and irregular Serbian forces as they withdrew, and arrived on 6 November.

=== Interwar period and World War II ===
After the Armistice of Villa Giusti signed by the Austro-Hungarians on 3 November 1918, Bosna was operated by the navy of the Hungarian People's Republic between 6 November and 13 December. She was then crewed by sailors of the newly created Kingdom of Serbs, Croats and Slovenes (KSCS, later the Kingdom of Yugoslavia) in 1918–19. Under the terms of the Treaty of Saint-Germain-en-Laye concluded in September 1919, Bosna was transferred to the KSCS along with a range of other vessels, including three other river monitors, but was officially handed over to the KSCS Navy and renamed Vardar in 1920. In 1925–26, Vardar was refitted, but by the following year only two of the four river monitors of the KSCS Navy were being retained in full commission at any time. In 1932, the British naval attaché reported that Yugoslav ships were engaging in little gunnery training, and few exercises or manoeuvres, due to reduced budgets.

On 6 April 1941, the German-led Axis invasion of Yugoslavia began, and Vardar was based at Dubovac, as the flagship of the 1st Monitor Division, responsible for the Romanian border on the Danube, under the operational control of the 3rd Infantry Division Dunavska. She was commanded by Poručnik bojnog broda (Note: Equivalent to a United States Navy lieutenant commander.) Milivoj Kockar. On that day, Vardar and her fellow monitor Sava fought off several attacks by individual Luftwaffe aircraft on their base. Over the next three days, the two monitors laid mines in the Danube near the Romanian border.

On 11 April, the two monitors were forced to withdraw from Dubovac towards Belgrade, during which they came under repeated attacks by Junkers Ju 87 Stuka dive bombers. Vardar and her fellow monitor were undamaged, and anchored at the confluence of the Danube and Sava near Belgrade about 20:00, where they were joined by the monitor Morava. The three captains conferred, and decided to scuttle their vessels due to the high water levels in the rivers and low bridges, which meant there was insufficient clearance for the monitors to navigate freely. The crews of the monitors were transshipped to two tugboats, but when one of the tugboats was passing under a railway bridge, charges on the bridge accidentally exploded and the bridge fell onto the tugboat. Of the 110 officers and men aboard the vessel, 95 were killed.

After the scuttling of the monitors, around 450 officers and men from the Vardar and various other riverine vessels gathered at Obrenovac. Armed only with personal weapons and some machine guns stripped from the scuttled vessels, they started towards the Bay of Kotor in the southern Adriatic in two groups. The smaller of the two groups reached its objective, but the larger group only made it as far as Sarajevo by 14 April when they surrendered to German troops approaching the city. The Bay of Kotor was captured by the Italian XVII Corps on 17 April.
