= Körös-class river monitor =

Class overview
- Name: Körös
- Builders: Schönichen & Hartmann, Budapest
- Operators: Austro-Hungarian Navy; Royal Yugoslav Navy
- Preceded by: Leitha class
- Succeeded by: Temes class
- Built: 1890–1893
- In service: 1892–1944
- Completed: 2
- Lost: 1
- Retired: 1

General characteristics
- Type: River monitor
- Displacement: 448 t (441 long tons)
- Length: 54 m (177 ft 2 in)
- Beam: 9 m (29 ft 6 in)
- Draught: 1.2 m (3 ft 11 in)
- Installed power: 2 Yarrow boilers; 1,200 ihp (890 kW)
- Propulsion: 2 screws; 2 Triple-expansion steam engines
- Speed: 10 knots (19 km/h; 12 mph)
- Complement: 77 officers and enlisted men
- Armament: 1 × twin 120 mm (4.7 in) guns; 2 × single 66 mm (2.6 in) AA guns; 2 × single machine guns
- Armour: Belt: 50 mm (2 in); Gun turrets: 50–75 mm (2–3 in); Deck: 19 mm (0.75 in); Conning tower: 50 mm (2 in); bulkheads: 50 mm (2 in)

The Körös class consisted of two river monitors built for the Austro-Hungarian Navy during the 1890s. They both served during World War I and were allocated to the Kingdom of Yugoslavia after the war by the Allies. Szamos was disarmed and sold into civilian service in 1921 while Körös was renamed Morava and retained by the Royal Yugoslav Navy. The ship saw combat during the Invasion of Yugoslavia by the Axis powers in 1941 during World War II, but was ultimately scuttled by her crew to prevent her capture.

== Ships ==
Ship	New name	Builder	Laid down	Launched	Commissioned	Fate
SMS Körös	Morava	Schönichen & Hartmann, Budapest	1890	1892	1892	Scuttled, 11/12 April 1941
SMS Szamos	Tivadar	Schönichen & Hartmann, Budapest	1891	25 August 1892	1893	Disarmed and sold into civilian service, January 1921 Scrapped, 1989

== Bibliography ==
- Branfill-Cook, Roger (2018). River Gunboats: An Illustrated Encyclopedia. Barnsley, UK: Seaforth Publishing. ISBN 978-1-84832-365-0.
- Dodson, Aidan & Cant, Serena (2020). Spoils of War: The Fate of Enemy Fleets after Two World Wars. Barnsley, UK: Seaforth Publishing. ISBN 978-1-5267-4198-1.
- Freivogel, Zvonimir (2020). Warships of the Royal Yugoslav Navy 1918–1945. Vol. 1. Zagreb, Croatia: Despot Infinitus. ISBN 978-953-8218-72-9.
- Greger, René (1976). Austro-Hungarian Warships of World War I. London: Ian Allan. ISBN 0-7110-0623-7.
