= SMS Körös =

River monitor built for the Austro-Hungarian Navy

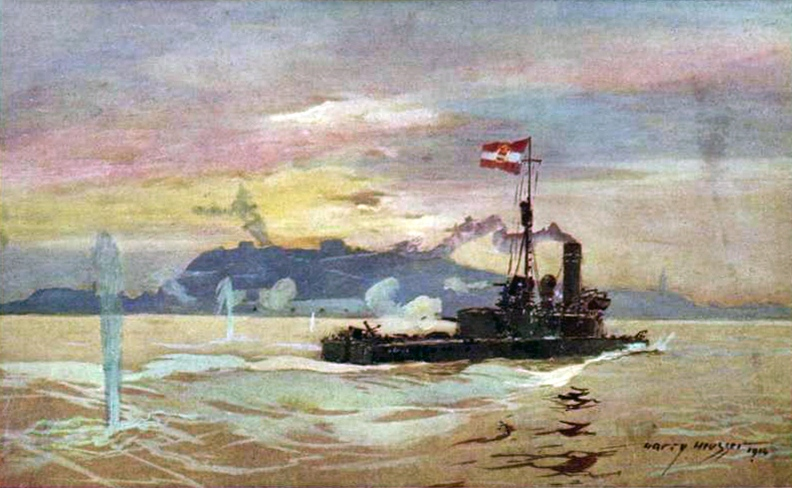
- A painting of SMS Körös bombarding Belgrade in 1914

History

Austria-Hungary
- Name: Körös
- Namesake: Körös River
- Laid down: 30 March 1890
- Launched: 5 February 1892
- Commissioned: 21 April 1892
- Out of service: 6 November 1918
- Fate: Transferred to the Hungarian People's Republic

Hungarian People's Republic
- Name: Körös
- Namesake: Körös River
- Acquired: 6 November 1918
- Out of service: 13 December 1918
- Fate: Assigned to the Kingdom of Serbs, Croats and Slovenes (KSCS)

Kingdom of Yugoslavia
- Name: Morava (Морава)
- Namesake: Morava River
- Acquired: 1920
- Fate: Scuttled by her crew on 11/12 April 1941

Independent State of Croatia
- Name: Bosna
- Namesake: Bosna River
- Acquired: Raised and repaired
- Fate: Mined June 1944, raised and broken up 1945

General characteristics
- Class & type: Körös-class river monitor
- Displacement: 448 t (441 long tons)
- Length: 54 m (177 ft 2 in)
- Beam: 9 m (29 ft 6 in)
- Draught: 1.2 m (3 ft 11 in)
- Installed power: 2 Yarrow boilers; 1,200 ihp (890 kW)
- Propulsion: 2 screws; 2 Triple-expansion steam engines
- Speed: 10 knots (19 km/h; 12 mph)
- Complement: 77 officers and enlisted men
- Armament: 1 × twin 120 mm (4.7 in) guns; 2 × 66 mm (2.6 in) AA guns; 2 × machine guns
- Armour: Belt and bulkheads: 50 mm (2 in); Deck: 19 mm (0.75 in); Conning tower and gun turrets: 75 mm (3 in)

SMS Körös (pronounced [ˈkørøʃ]) was the name ship of the Körös-class river monitors built for the Austro-Hungarian Navy. Completed in 1892, the ship was part of the Danube Flotilla, and fought various Allied forces from Belgrade down the Danube to the Black Sea during World War I. After brief service with the Hungarian People's Republic at the end of the war, she was transferred to the newly created Kingdom of Serbs, Croats, and Slovenes (later Yugoslavia), and renamed Morava. She remained in service throughout the interwar period, although budget restrictions meant she was not always in full commission.

During the World War II German-led Axis invasion of Yugoslavia in April 1941, Morava was the flagship of the 2nd Mine Barrage Division, and operated on the River Tisza. She fought off attacks by the Luftwaffe, and shot down one enemy aircraft, but was forced to withdraw to Belgrade. Due to high river levels and low bridges, navigating monitors was difficult, and she was scuttled by her crew on 11 April. Some of her crew tried to escape cross-country towards the southern Adriatic coast, but most surrendered on 14 April. The remainder made their way to the Bay of Kotor, which was captured by the Italian XVII Corps on 17 April. She was later raised by the Navy of the Independent State of Croatia, an Axis puppet state, and continued in service as Bosna until June 1944, when she struck a mine and sank.

== Description and construction ==
The name ship of the Körös-class river monitors was built for the Austro-Hungarian Navy by H. Schönichen. She was laid down at Budapest on 30 March 1891. Körös and her sister ship SMS Szamos doubled the size of Austria-Hungary's Danube Flotilla. The two monitors each had an overall length of 54 m (177 ft 2 in), a beam of 9 m (29 ft 6 in), and a normal draught of 1.2 m (3 ft 11 in). Her displacement was 448 tonnes (441 long tons), and her crew consisted of 77 officers and enlisted men. The ship was powered using steam generated by two Yarrow boilers driving two triple-expansion steam engines, and carried 54 tonnes (53 long tons) of coal. Her engines were rated at 1,200 ihp (890 kW) and she was designed to reach a top speed of 10 knots (19 km/h; 12 mph).

Körös was armed with two single gun turrets of 120 mm (4.7 in)/L35 (Note: L/35 denotes the length of the gun. In this case, the L/35 gun is 35 calibre, meaning that the gun was 35 times as long as the diameter of its bore.) fore and aft, two superfiring 66 mm (2.6 in)/L42 anti-aircraft guns protected by gun shields on the superstructure fore and aft, and two machine guns. Her main guns fired a 26 kg (57 lb) armour-piercing, high explosive, shrapnel or fragmentation shell to a maximum range of 8.2 km (5.1 mi) at an elevation of 20°. They could depress to −6° and elevate to +25°. Her armour consisted of a belt and bulkheads 50 mm (2.0 in) thick, deck armour 19 mm (0.75 in) thick, and conning tower and gun turret armour 75 mm (3.0 in) thick. The armour was produced by the Witkowitz steel works, in Moravia. She was launched on 5 February 1892 and commissioned on 21 April of the same year. Her sister ship Szamos was completed in 1893, and was identical except for 50 mm (2.0 in) armour on her conning tower.

== Career ==
=== Commissioning and World War I ===
==== Serbian campaign ====
At the start of World War I, Körös was based at Zemun, just upstream from Belgrade on the Danube. Her commander was Linienschiffsleutnant (Note: Equivalent to an Austro-Hungarian Army Hauptman (captain).) (LSL) Josef Meusburger, and she was accompanied by another three monitors and three patrol boats. Austria-Hungary declared war on Serbia on 28 July 1914, and that night the flotilla fired the first shots of the war against fortifications at the Zemun–Belgrade railway bridge over the river Sava and on the Topčider Hill, although Körös was not initially involved. The Serbs were outgunned by the monitors, and by August began to receive assistance from the Russians. This support included the supply and emplacement of naval guns and the establishment of river obstacles and mines.

The Austro-Hungarian base at Zemun was briefly evacuated due to a Serbian counterattack in September. On 28 September, Körös, along with the monitor SMS Temes, a patrol boat and a minesweeper, broke through the minefields on the Sava near Belgrade and pushed upstream to join the fighting near Šabac. In November, French artillery support arrived in Belgrade, endangering the monitor's anchorage. The stalemate continued until December 1914 when the Serbs briefly evacuated Belgrade in the face of an Austro-Hungarian assault, although Körös did not support this action. After less than two weeks, the Austro-Hungarians had to withdraw from Belgrade, and it was soon recaptured by the Serbs with Russian and French assistance. Körös continued in action against Serbia and her allies at Belgrade until December, when the base of the Danube Flotilla was withdrawn north to Petrovaradin for the winter.

In January 1915, British artillery arrived in Belgrade, further bolstering its defences. On 22 April 1915, a British picket boat that had been brought overland by rail from Salonika was used to attack the Danube Flotilla anchorage at Zemun, firing two torpedoes without success. Bulgaria joined the Central Powers in September 1915, and the Serbian Army soon faced an overwhelming Austro-Hungarian, German and Bulgarian ground invasion. On 7 October, the Austro-Hungarian 3rd Army attacked Belgrade, and Körös, along with the majority of the flotilla, was heavily engaged in support of the crossings near the Belgrade Fortress and Ada Ciganlija island. During the final river crossing and support of the resulting bridgehead, the ship provided close support, during which her stack was hit and damaged. The following day, Körös assisted SMS Enns when the latter took a direct hit and began to take on water.

Following the capture of Belgrade, the flotilla sailed downstream to Orșova near the Hungarian–Romanian border and waited for the lower Danube to be swept for mines. It then escorted a series of munitions convoys down the Danube to Lom, from where they were transferred to the Bulgarian railway system for shipment to the Ottoman Empire.

==== Romanian campaign ====
In November 1915, Körös and the other monitors were assembled at Ruschuk, Bulgaria. The position of Romania was uncertain; the Central Powers were aware that the Romanians were negotiating to enter the war on the opposing side of the Entente. To protect the Danube's 480 km (300 mi) border between Romania and Bulgaria, the flotilla established a sheltered base in the Belene Canal. When the Romanians entered the war on 27 August 1916, the monitors were again at Rustschuk, and were immediately attacked by three improvised torpedo boats operating out of the Romanian river port of Giurgiu. The torpedoes that were fired missed the monitors but struck a lighter loaded with fuel. The Second Monitor Division, consisting of Körös and three other monitors, was tasked with shelling Giurgiu. This bombardment set fire to oil storage tanks as well as the railway station and magazines, and sank several Romanian lighters. While the attack was underway, the First Monitor Division escorted supply ships back to the Belene anchorage. The Körös and her companions then destroyed two Romanian patrol boats and an improvised minelayer on their way back to Belene. This was followed by forays of the monitors both east and west of Belene, during which both Turnu Măgurele and Zimnicea were shelled.

In April 1918, Körös, along with three other monitors, two patrol boats and a tug, were formed into Flottenabteilung Wulff (Fleet Division Wulff) under the command of Flottenkapitän (Fleet Captain) Olav Wulff. Flottenabteilung Wulff was sent through the mouth of the Danube and across the Black Sea to Odessa, where it spent several months supporting the Austro-Hungarian troops enforcing the peace agreement with Russia. It returned to the Danube at the end of August, and was anchored at Brăila on 12 September. On 16 October, Körös and the rest of the First Monitor Division sailed from Brăila to Belene. For several weeks the Danube Flotilla was engaged in protecting Austro-Hungarian troops retreating towards Budapest, fighting French and irregular Serbian forces as they withdrew; the flotilla arrived in Belene on 6 November.

=== Interwar period and World War II ===
==== 1919–41 ====
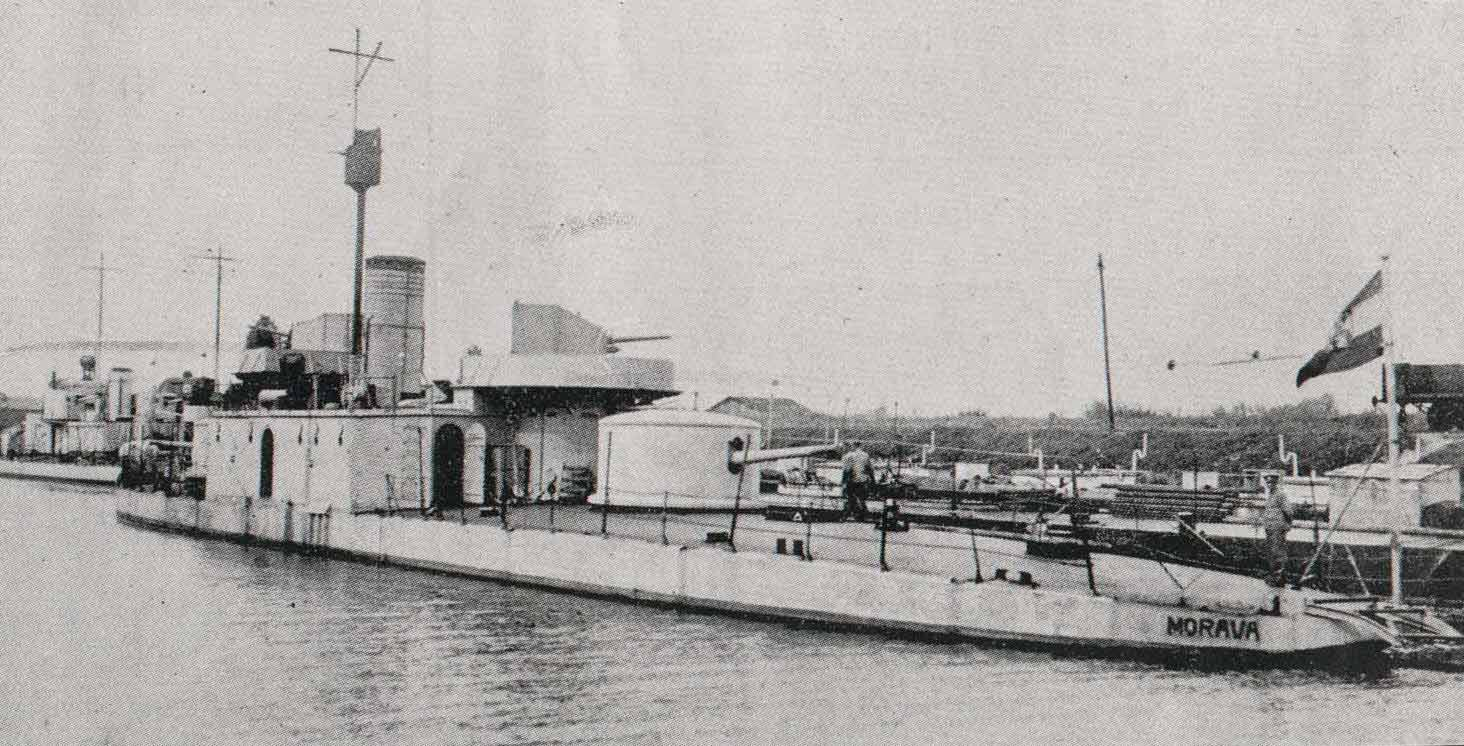
Morava in 1924

After the Armistice of Villa Giusti signed by the Austro-Hungarians on 3 November 1918, Körös was operated by the navy of the Hungarian People's Republic between 6 November and 13 December. She was then crewed by sailors of the newly created Kingdom of Serbs, Croats and Slovenes (KSCS, later the Kingdom of Yugoslavia) in 1918–19. Under the terms of the Treaty of Saint-Germain-en-Laye concluded in September 1919, Körös was transferred to the KSCS along with a range of other vessels, including three other river monitors, but was officially handed over to the KSCS Navy and renamed Morava in 1920. Her sister ship Szamos was dismantled and used as a pontoon. In 1925–26, Morava was refitted, but by the following year only two of the four river monitors of the KSCS Navy were being retained in full commission at any time. In 1932, the British naval attaché reported that Yugoslav ships were engaging in little gunnery training, and few exercises or manoeuvres, due to reduced budgets.

==== 1941–45 ====
On 6 April 1941, when the World War II German-led Axis invasion of Yugoslavia began, Morava was based at Stara Kanjiža on the Tisza river, as the flagship of the 2nd Mine Barrage Division. This force was responsible for the Hungarian border, and came under the operational control of the 7th Infantry Division Potiska. The remainder of the 2nd Mine Barrage Division consisted of the river tug R-XXI, the river transport Senta, and a few mobilised customs motorboats, based further south on the Tisza at Senta. On 7 April, Morava withdrew to Senta, where she was attacked by German aircraft. According to her commander, Poručnik bojnog broda (Note: Equivalent to a United States Navy lieutenant commander.) Božidar Aranđelović, her crew shot down one German aircraft and captured an Oberstleutnant of the Luftwaffe. (Note: Oberstleutnant was equivalent to a United States Army lieutenant colonel.) On 10 April, Morava was ordered to withdraw to conform with the retreat of the 2nd Army Group of the Royal Yugoslav Army from Bačka and Baranja. On the evening of 11 April, Morava anchored at the confluence of the Danube and Sava near Belgrade, along with her fellow monitors Vardar and Sava, and Aranđelović took command of the flotilla. The three captains conferred, and decided to scuttle their vessels due to the high water levels in the rivers and low bridges, which meant insufficient clearance for the monitors to navigate freely. The crews of the monitors were transshipped to two tugboats, but when one of the tugboats was passing under a railway bridge, demolition charges on the bridge exploded prematurely and the bridge fell onto the tugboat. Of the 110 officers and men aboard the vessel, 95 were killed.

After the scuttling of the monitors, around 450 officers and men from the Morava and various other riverine vessels gathered at Obrenovac, and armed only with personal weapons and some machine guns stripped from the scuttled vessels, started towards the Bay of Kotor in the southern Adriatic in two groups. The larger of the two groups only made it as far as Sarajevo on 14 April before they surrendered. The smaller group made their way to the Bay of Kotor, and was captured by the Italian XVII Corps on 17 April.

Morava was later raised and repaired by the navy of an Axis puppet state, the Independent State of Croatia, in which she served as Bosna. She served alongside her fellow monitor Sava, which had also been raised and repaired, but retained her name. Along with six captured motorboats and ten auxiliary vessels, they made up the riverine police force of the Croatian state. Bosna was part of the 2nd Patrol Group of the River Flotilla Command, headquartered at Zemun. She struck a mine near Bosanski Novi on the River Una and sank in June 1944. The following year she was raised and broken up.
