= Austro-Hungarian Danube Flotilla =

Danube Flotilla
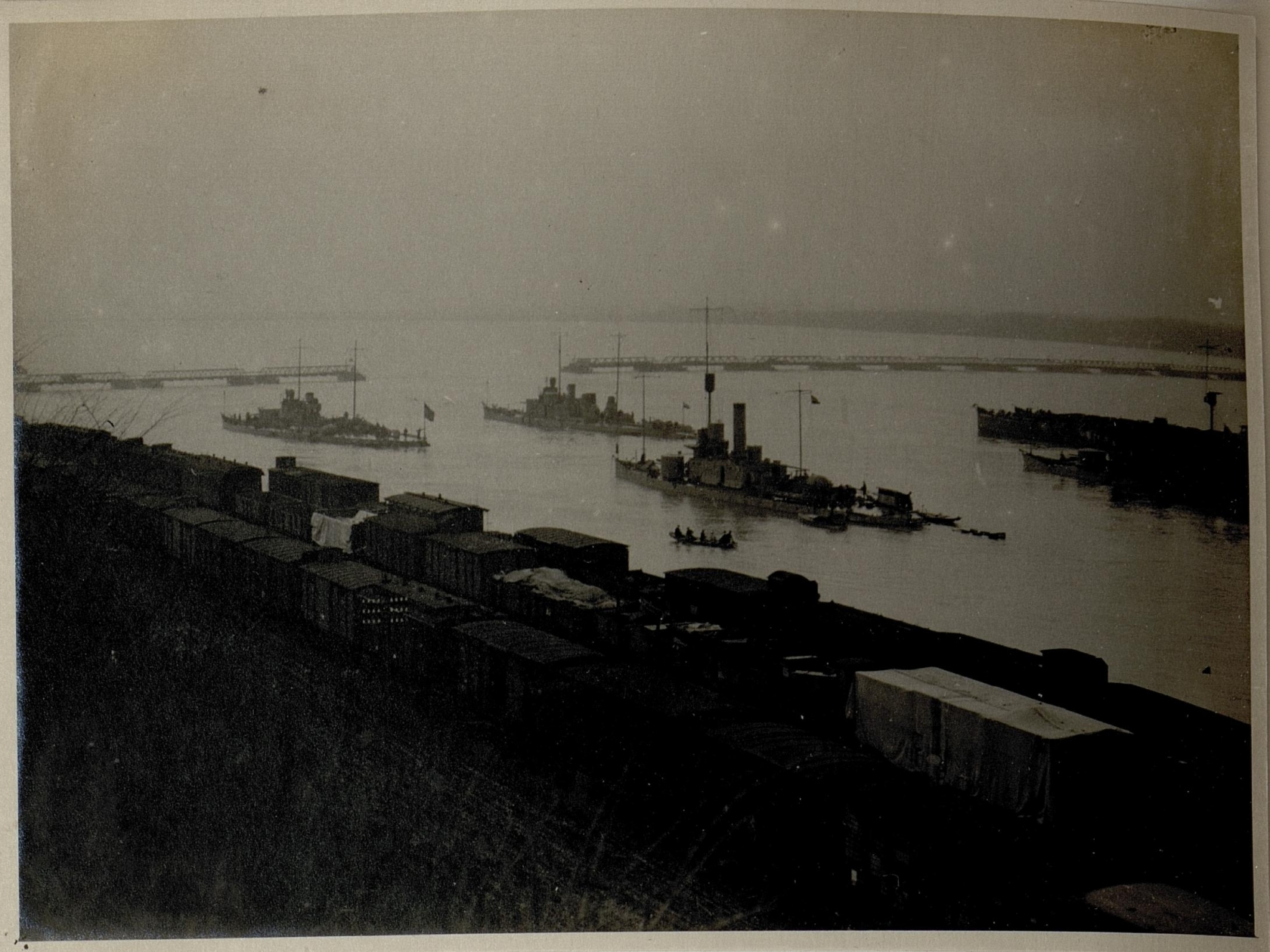
- Austro-Hungarian monitors at Rustschuk in 1916
- Active: c. 1870-1918
- Country: Austria-Hungary
- Branch: Austro-Hungarian Navy
- Type: Brown-water navy
- Engagements: World War I: Serbian campaign; Romanian campaign

The Austro-Hungarian Danube Flotilla was a section of the Austro-Hungarian Navy established after the Austro-Prussian War. It consisted of 9 gunboats (valued at 17.5 million golden crowns), 8 armoured patrol boats (valued at 9 million golden crowns) and 55 other miscellaneous boats (valued at 4.5 million golden crowns), with a combined total manpower of 1000 soldiers.

The flotilla fired the first shots of World War I on the night of 28/29 July 1914 during the bombardment of Belgrade, hours after the Austrian declaration of war against Serbia had been transmitted. The three ships present were SMS Temes, SMS Bodrog where the first shots of World War I just after 01:00 on 29 July 1914, when she and two other monitors shelled Serbian defences near Belgrade and SMS Szamos and continued to participate in the war on the Eastern Front between 1914 and 1918 until Austria-Hungary's collapse. The 1920 Treaty of Trianon divided the ships of the flotilla between Austria, Hungary, Yugoslavia and Romania.

== Role ==
The River Danube acted both as a natural border and a key military route for the Austro-Hungarian Empire. The flotilla therefore served multiple military and political roles, such as: securing traffic circuits, patrolling and naval registration, researching and charting the river basin, attack and defence against enemy river naval forces, bombarding military facilities and enemy troops along the river banks, supporting friendly troops along the river banks with artillery, and transporting and escorting crossing and disembarking troops and materiel. In a number of cases, control of both river banks was necessary to remove obstacles blocking waterborne navigation, such as netting.

Despite being part of the wider oceangoing Austro-Hungarian Navy, the nature of riverine warfare meant that the Danube Flotilla consisted of ships with a shallow draft and low freeboard. The flotilla also had to take into account the one-dimensional aspect of confrontation due to the relatively small widths of the watercourses; enemy flotillas on the same course of navigation could not avoid each other. Other limiting factors were represented both by the depth of water in a particular place, as well as boats having sufficient power to sail against the current.

== History ==
In the first eight months of 1916, after the occupation of Serbia by the Central Powers, the flotilla's main objective was to ensure the security of the import of Romanian cereals, the only ones available in the context of the blockade imposed by the Central Powers, which were carried out with the help of the Danube merchant fleet. At the end of the summer of 1916, the flotilla was to be deployed to the new operational base located in the Belene Canal, where it was to be available in the event of a war with Romania. The purpose of its deployment in this area was to integrate it into the joint actions that were to be carried out together with the ground troops. Also, the heavy equipment for crossing the Danube in order to attack Romania from the south was transferred from Belgrade. From an operational point of view, the group of ships was placed at the disposal of the German command located south of the Danube, in northern Bulgaria.

During the Romanian campaign, control of the Danube was of critical importance to Austria-Hungary as it acted as the most important, fastest and most efficient route to the southeast for the army's supply in the region. To control this route, Austria-Hungary created a flotilla consisting of ten monitors as capital ships. These were joined by twelve fast patrol vessels, as well as armed steamers. They were joined by minesweepers, pontoon vessels and logistical support vessels (barges, launch boats and tugs). The flotilla also included barges with medical facilities and command ships, as well as a German hospital ship.

After the start of the fighting, the Austro-Hungarian ships attacked the Romanian river ports, trying to save their own commercial shipping material, sinking Romanian and Russian ships and destroyed port and military equipment. In the following period, based on the Belene Canal, they fulfilled a defensive role for the southern bank of the Danube, covering the rear of the troops fighting in Dobrudja. During the fighting waged in southern Dobrudja by the Austro-Hungarian ships, the flotilla could not take part in military operations, being stopped by the river barrier at Kalimok, which could only be removed after the Central Powers troops had control of both banks of the river.

A crucial role was played by the Austro-Hungarian ships during the Flâmânda operation in early October 1916, when the attempt to cross the Danube by Romanian troops on the Flâmânda-Reahovo bridge was stopped by destroying the bridge. In November 1916, the crossing of the Danube by the Central Powers forces at Sviștov represented the flotilla's last major offensive operation during the First World War. After this, the ships supported the right flank of the German-Bulgarian-Turkish offensive in Wallachia, as well as taking over the rest of the Danube, in an action combined with that of the ground forces that took place behind the German advance in Wallachia.

In 1917, the military tasks of the Austro-Hungarian ships, now with their main base at Brăila, were directed towards protecting navigation on the Danube, taking possession of Romanian port facilities and clearing the lower course of the river of mines and other obstacles, in order to ensure the safe transport of grain and other products from occupied Romanian territory.

After the Treaty of Bucharest in May 1918 opened the way for ships to the Black Sea, the Austro-Hungarian flotilla was initially stationed at Sulina. In the spring of 1918, a group of monitors and reconnaissance ships crossed the Black Sea to provide artillery support to the Central Powers troops advancing into Ukraine. Later, the ships secured the routes of grain ships from Ukraine to the Central Empires, both in the Black Sea and on the Ukrainian inland waters that flowed into it.

In September 1918, the worsening military situation on the Balkan Front led to the withdrawal of ships from Ukraine. In October 1918, following Bulgaria's withdrawal from the war, the flotilla ensured the withdrawal of German troops from Bulgarian territory and Austro-Hungarian troops from Albanian and Serbian territory.

In the first part of November 1918, the flotilla began to disintegrate. The first to leave were the soldiers of South Slavic origin. As a result of the Armistice of Belgrade on 13 November 1918, part of the flotilla was handed over to the Allies in Belgrade, and what was left of it was disarmed. According to the terms of the peace treaties of Saint-Germain-en-Laye in September 1919 and Trianon in June 1920, the flotilla's ships were handed over to the main Entente powers and their allies; for which four of the monitors were awarded to the newly-formed Kingdom of Yugoslavia, and three to Romania. Two of the monitors still survive today as museum vessels: SMS Leitha, in Budapest and SMS Bodrog (renamed Sava in Yugoslav service), in Belgrade.

== Order of battle ==
=== Ships ===
The Danube Flotilla comprised 10 monitors, 12 patrol boats, 1 armed steamboat, 1 minesweeper, and 55 smaller vessels including logistic support vessels, tugs, medical barges, a German hospital ship and a command ship.

Monitors

- SMS Leitha
- SMS Maros
- SMS Bodrog
- SMS Temes
- SMS Sava
- SMS Inn
- SMS Enns
- SMS Körös
- SMS Szamos
- SMS Bosna

== See also ==
- Hungarian River Forces
