= Raid on Ruse =

- Part of Romanian Campaign of World War I
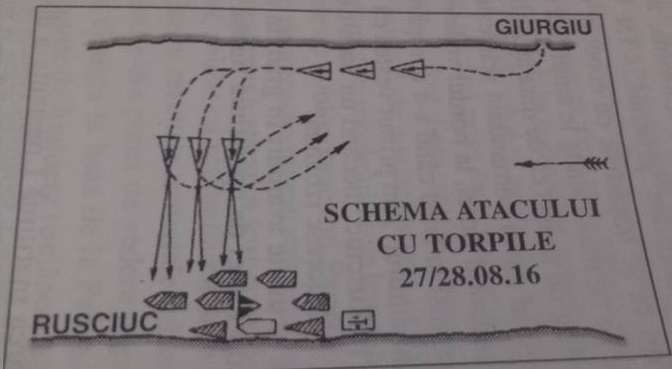
- Diagram of the Romanian attack
Date	27 August 1916
Location	Ruse, Bulgaria
Result	Romanian victory
Territorial changes	The Austro-Hungarian Danube Flotilla retreats 130 km (81 miles) West along the Danube and is prevented from interfering in the subsequent Battle of Turtucaia

Belligerents
Romania	Austria-Hungary

Commanders and leaders
Constantin Niculescu-Rizea	Karl Lucich

Strength
3 torpedo boats (6 torpedoes)	5 monitors 4 armed boats 1+ barges

Casualties and losses
None	1 barge sunk Light damage to the Bulgarian port

The Raid on Ruse was the first naval action to take place on the Romanian front during World War I. It took place on the first day of the campaign, 27 August 1916, just as Romanian troops were crossing the border into Transylvania, then part of Austria-Hungary.

== The Romanian attack ==
During the night of 27 August 1916 three Romanian small torpedo boats (the old 10-ton Rândunica and the converted hydraulic service vessels Bujorescu and Catinca, each armed with two torpedoes in wooden carriages) attacked the Austro-Hungarian Navy's Danube Flotilla stationed in the Bulgarian port of Ruse, which consisted of five monitors and four armed river boats. The objective was to sink one of the monitors, but the attack failed in its immediate purpose, as only one barge loaded with fuel was sunk (by Rândunica, commanded by Captain Constantin Niculescu-Rizea) and a quay was damaged by another torpedo. Due to this attack, however, the Austro-Hungarian Danube Flotilla (Commander Karl Lucich) retreated 130 kilometres (81 miles) west along the Danube, stopping at Belene and subsequently taking extensive defensive measures. The three crewmen of Rândunica were received as heroes in Bucharest, and the retreating Austro-Hungarian warships were prevented from interfering in the subsequent Battle of Turtucaia.
