= Battle of Cinghinarele Island =

Battle during the Romanian Campaign of WWI

Battle of the Cinghinarele Island
- Part of the Romanian Campaign of World War I
Date	2–8 October 1916
Location	Cinghinarele Island, Romania (near Belene, Bulgaria)
Result	Central Powers victory

Belligerents
Romania	Germany; Austria-Hungary: Austro-Hungarian navy

Strength
1 infantry company 2 batteries (6 guns)	Germany (7 October): Unknown infantry 1 artillery battery Austria-Hungary (7 October): Unknown combat engineers 2 river monitors

Casualties and losses
130 prisoners 6 guns captured	Unknown total Austria-Hungary (2 October): 1 barge damaged

The Battle of Cinghinarele Island was a military engagement between Central Powers forces (Germany and Austria-Hungary) on one side and Romanian forces on the other side during the Romanian Campaign of World War I. It took place in early October 1916. In late September 1916, Romanian forces occupied the island, setting up a garrison comprising an infantry company and six guns in two batteries. On 2 October, in support of the Flămânda Offensive, the Romanian garrison on the island attacked passing Austro-Hungarian warships, inflicting some damage and delaying the naval group long enough to allow a Romanian bridge over the Danube to be repaired. However, after an artillery bombardment which started on 7 October, the island was taken by the Central Powers on the 8th, the Romanian garrison being captured.

== Background ==
Following the defeat of the Romanian 3rd Army at Turtucaia in early September 1916, the commanding general of this army was replaced with Alexandru Averescu on 7 September, whom historian John Buchan considered "the ablest of Rumanian generals". At the end of September, Romanian forces occupied the island of Cinghinarele. Averescu had deployed on the island an infantry company along with two artillery batteries of three guns each. Cinghinarele is a low-lying island in the Danube, a third of a mile wide and two and a half miles long. It is located at the eastern opening of the Belene Channel. Aside from the garrison, the Romanians had also laid mines near the island.

== Battle ==
On 2 October, the Romanian batteries on the island opened fire at bypassing warships belonging to the Austro-Hungarian Navy's Groups I and IV of the Danube Flotilla. The Romanian guns holed Group I's coal barge, forcing the naval formation to run for cover in order to make repairs. Group IV decided not to risk shell fire hitting its fuel barge, and thus waited until nightfall before moving on. The two naval groups finally arrived a Ryahovo on the morning of 3 October. However, there they discovered that the Romanians had repaired damage to the bridge and were retreating across it. On 7 October, Group II of Austro-Hungarian monitors (Inn and Sava), along with a German artillery battery of 100 mm guns, began a bombardment of the Cinghinarele. On the 8th, a combined force of German infantry and Austro-Hungarian combat engineers overran the island, capturing the six guns along with 130 prisoners. The flotilla's minesweeping detachment subsequently cleared the channel.

== Aftermath ==
Following their conquest of the island, the Central Powers had placed their own pair of artillery batteries on Cinghinarele by the middle of November.
