= Vetren/Ciocănești =

Coordinates: 44°08′27.4″N 27°04′18.1″E

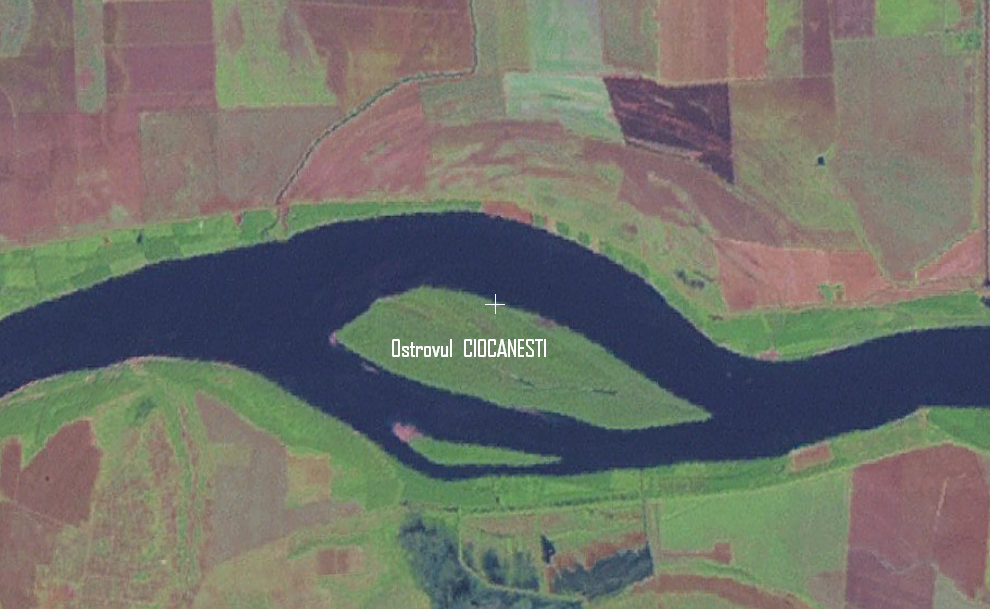

Vetren (Bulgarian: Ветрен) or Ciocănești (in Romanian) is an island in the Danube, just north of the UNESCO World Heritage Site Srebarna Nature Reserve in Silistra Province of Bulgaria and four miles south of Ciocănești, Călărași County, Romania. It is the subject of a territorial dispute between Bulgaria and Romania.
