= Danube Flotilla (Royal Navy) =

- Active: 1919–1926
- Country: United Kingdom
- Allegiance: British Empire
- Branch: Royal Navy
- Part of: Mediterranean Fleet
- Garrison/HQ: HMS Gloworm, Baja, Hungary
- Engagements: Serbian Campaign of World War I

The Danube Flotilla was naval formation of the British Mediterranean Fleet from 1919 to 1926.

== History ==
The British Naval Mission in Serbia, formed in 1914, was involved in the Serbian Campaign of World War I against the Austro-Hungarian Empire. Its flag ship was HMS Gloworm an Insect-class gunboat that was designed for use in shallow rivers or inshore and they were intended for use on the River Danube towards the end of World War I.

The flotilla was operating out of Baja, Hungary under the command of Captain Vernon Haggard in 1919. The flotilla was disbanded in 1926.

== Senior Officers, commanding ==
	Rank	Flag	Name	Term	Notes/Ref
Senior Officer, Danube Flotilla
1	Captain		Vernon Haggard	1919 – 4 February 1920	(later Admiral)
2	Captain		James F. Warton	23 March, 1920 – 1 August, 1920	(later Rear-admiral)
3	Captain		Arthur L. Snagge	1 August, 1920 – 25 September 1922	(later Vice-admiral)
4	Captain		Arthur E. F. Bedford	25 September 1922 – 22 September 1923	(later Vice admiral)
5	Captain		Douglas B. Le Motte	22 September 1923 – 4 January, 1926	(later Rear admiral)

== Bibliography ==
- Admiralty, Great Britain (April 1920). "Flag Officers in Commission". Navy List. London England: HM Stationery Office.
- Admiralty, Great Britain (January 1921). "Flag Officers in Commission". Navy List. London England: HM Stationery Office.
- Admiralty, Great Britain (January 1923). "Flag Officers in Commission". Navy List. London England: HM Stationery Office.
- Admiralty, Great Britain (July 1924). "Flag Officers in Commission". Navy List. London England: HM Stationery Office.
- Herwig, Holger H. (2014). The First World War: Germany and Austria-Hungary 1914-1918. London England: A&C Black. ISBN 9781472510815.
- Imperial War Museums (1919). Greenwich, London, England: Imperial War Museums UK.
- Kemp, Paul J. "'My Futile Mission': Captain Vernon Haggard and the Danube Flotilla, 1919". Imperial War Museum Review 2 (1987).
- Miklós, Lojkó (1995). British policy on Hungary, 1918-1919 : a documentary sourcebook. London England: School of Slavonic and East European Studies.
- Sondhaus, Lawrence (2011). World War One: The Global Revolution. Cambridge England: Cambridge University Press. ISBN 9781107782501.
