= SMS Szamos =

River monitor built for the Austro-Hungarian Navy

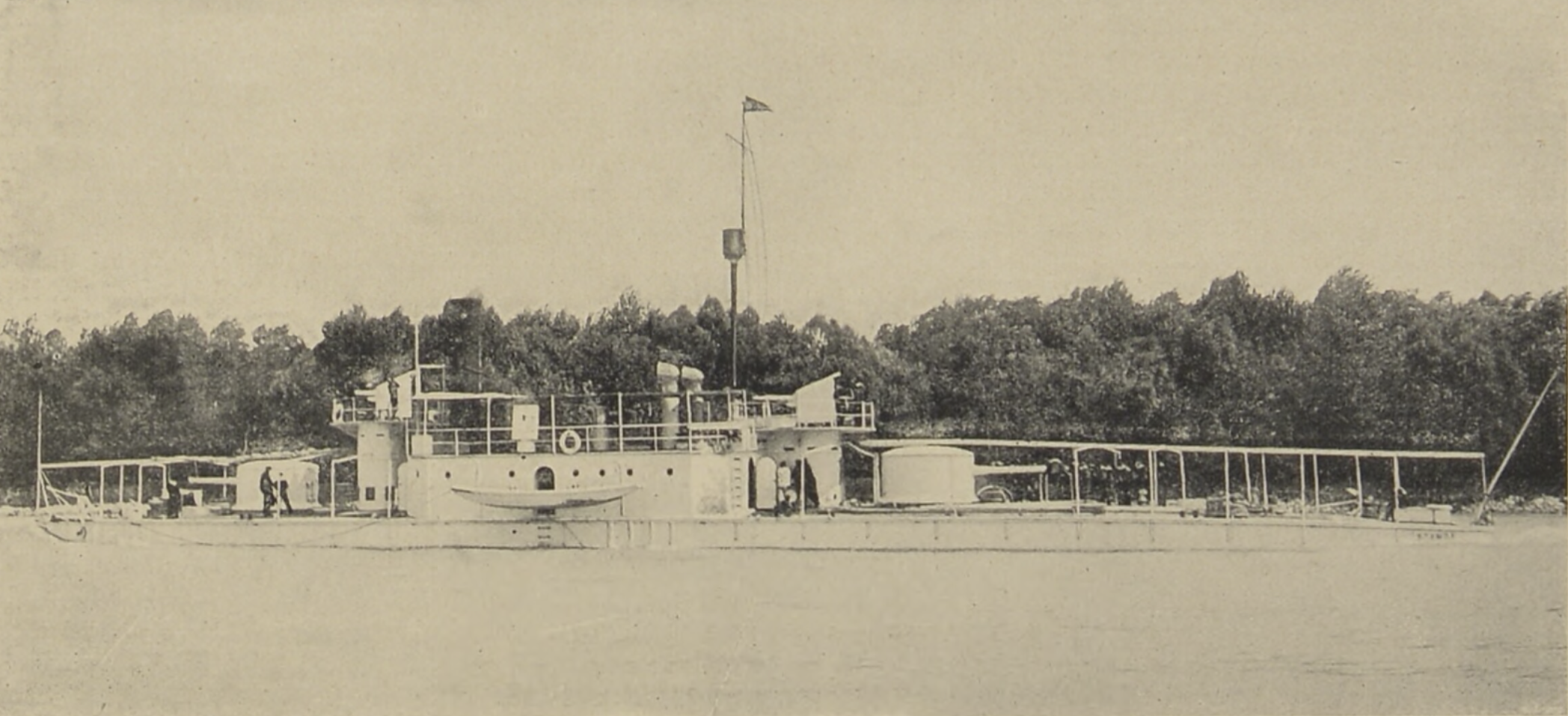
- Szamos in 1917

History

Austria-Hungary
- Name: Szamos
- Namesake: Szamos River
- Builder: Schönichen & Hartmann, Budapest
- Laid down: 1891
- Launched: 25 August 1892
- Commissioned: 1893
- Out of service: 6 November 1918
- Fate: Transferred to the Hungarian People's Republic

Hungarian People's Republic
- Acquired: 6 November 1918
- Out of service: 31 December 1918
- Fate: Assigned to the Kingdom of Serbs, Croats and Slovenes, 1920

Kingdom of Yugoslavia
- Name: Tivadar
- Acquired: 1920
- Fate: Disarmed and sold for service as a crane barge, January 1921

General characteristics
- Class & type: Körös-class river monitor
- Displacement: 448 t (441 long tons)
- Length: 54 m (177 ft 2 in)
- Beam: 9 m (29 ft 6 in)
- Draught: 1.2 m (3 ft 11 in)
- Installed power: 2 Yarrow boilers; 1,200 ihp (890 kW)
- Propulsion: 2 screws; 2 Triple-expansion steam engines
- Speed: 10 knots (19 km/h; 12 mph)
- Complement: 77 officers and enlisted men
- Armament: 1 × twin 120 mm (4.7 in) guns; 2 × single 66 mm (2.6 in) AA guns; 2 × single machine guns
- Armour: Belt: 50 mm (2 in); Gun turrets: 50–75 mm (2–3 in); Deck: 19 mm (0.75 in); Conning tower: 50 mm (2 in); bulkheads: 50 mm (2 in)

Szamos was one of two Körös-class river monitors built for the Austro-Hungarian Navy during the 1890s. Completed in 1893, she participated in the First World War of 1914–1918 and the subsequent Hungarian–Czechoslovak War of 1918–1919.

== Bibliography ==
- Branfill-Cook, Roger (2018). River Gunboats: An Illustrated Encyclopedia. Barnsley, UK: Seaforth Publishing. ISBN 978-1-84832-365-0.
- Dodson, Aidan & Cant, Serena (2020). Spoils of War: The Fate of Enemy Fleets after Two World Wars. Barnsley, UK: Seaforth Publishing. ISBN 978-1-5267-4198-1.
- Freivogel, Zvonimir (2020). Warships of the Royal Yugoslav Navy 1918–1945. Vol. 1. Zagreb, Croatia: Despot Infinitus. ISBN 978-953-8218-72-9.
- Greger, René (1976). Austro-Hungarian Warships of World War I. London: Ian Allan. ISBN 0-7110-0623-7.
