= Romanian Navy during World War I =

The Royal Romanian Navy during World War I (1914–1918) was divided into two fleets and fought against the forces of the Central Powers. When Romania entered the war in August 1916, the Romanian Navy was officially divided as follows (although usage of the warships was fluid and their assignments changed as the war progressed):

== River warships ==
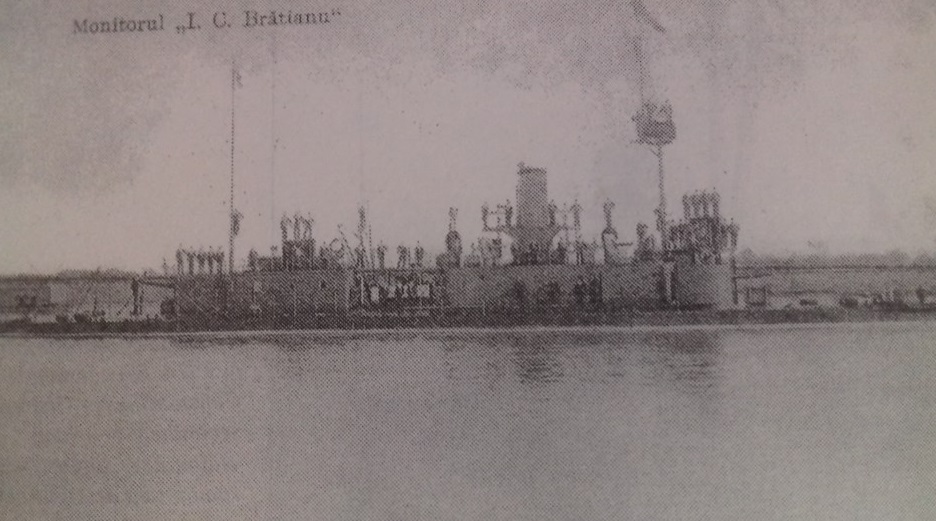
NMS Brătianu

River Monitors

- Brătianu-class
  - NMS I. C. Bratianu
  - NMS Al. Lahovari
  - NMS L. Catargiu
  - NMS M. Kogalniceanu

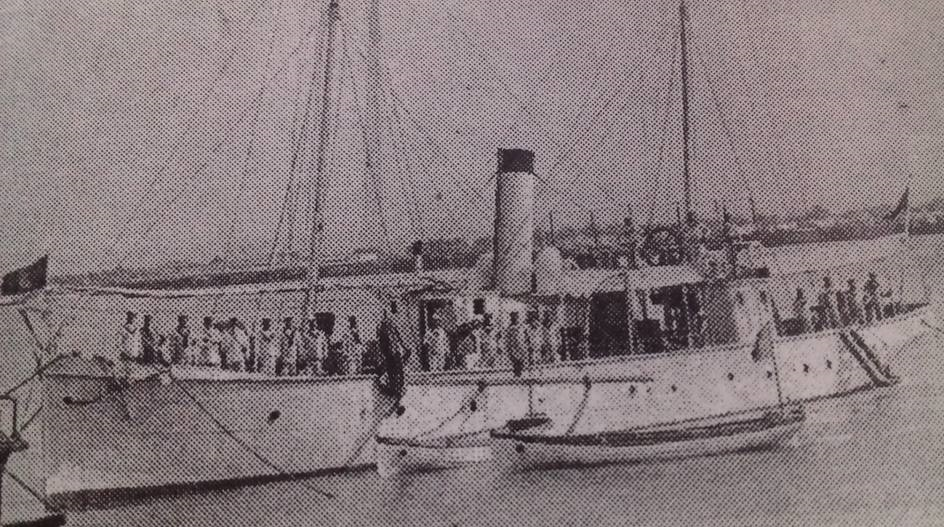
NMS Grivița

Gunboats

- Oltul-class (built in the 1880s in Britain, 110 tons, top speed of 10–12 knots, armed with 1 x 57 mm and 1 x 37 mm)
  - NMS Oltul
  - NMS Siretul
  - NMS Bistrita
- Rahova-class (built in 1882 in Britain, 45 tons, top speed of 9 knots, armed with 1 x 37 mm and 1 x Nordenfelt gun)
  - NMS Rahova
  - NMS Smârdan
  - NMS Opanez
  - NMS Silistra

Torpedo boats

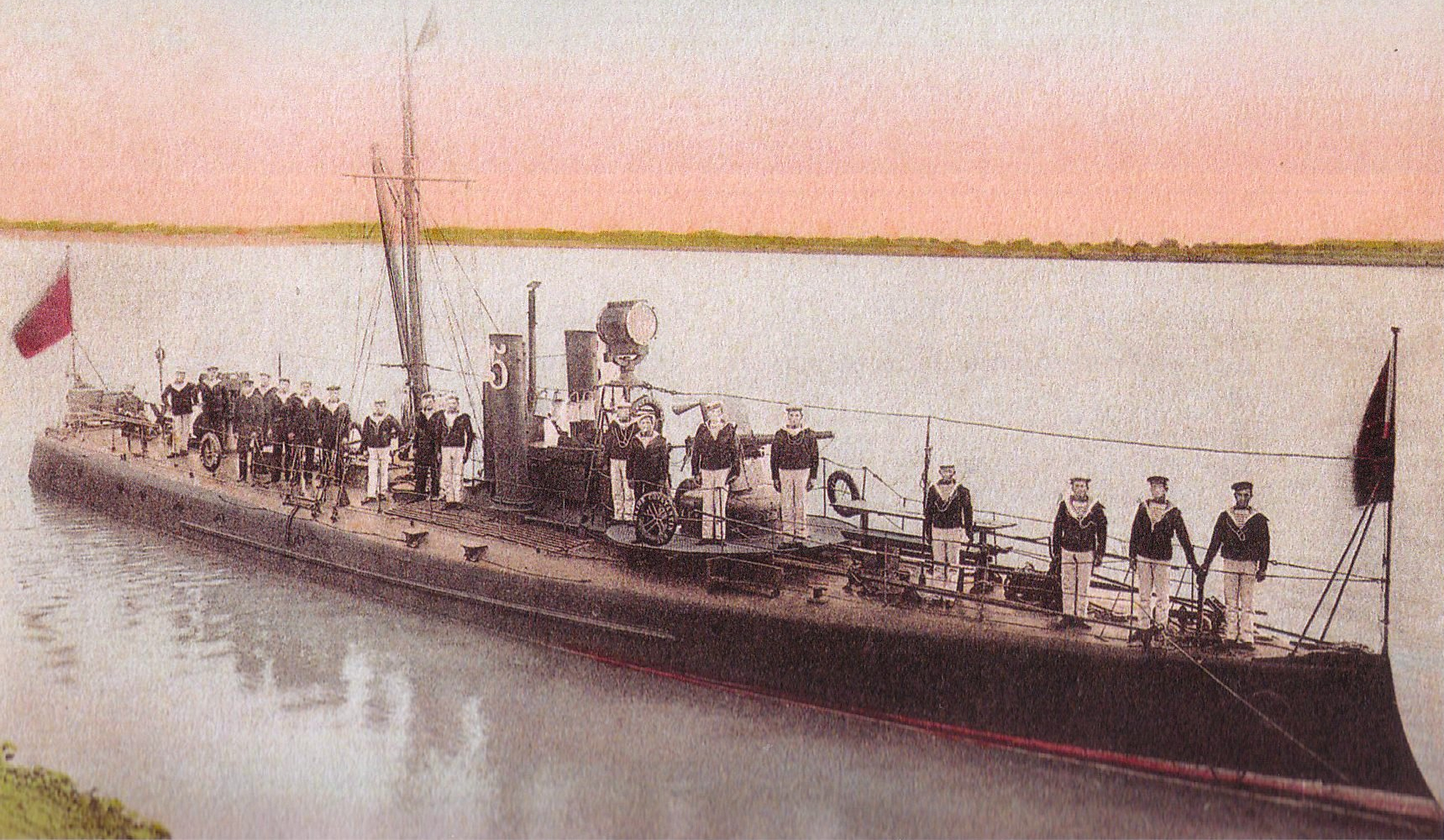
Căpitan Nicolae Lascăr Bogdan-class river torpedo boat

- Căpitan Nicolae Lascăr Bogdan-class (built in 1906 in Britain, 47 tons, top speed of 18 knots, armed with 1 x 47 mm, 1 x 6.5 mm and two torpedo tubes)
  - NMS Major Ene
  - NMS Captain L. Bogdan
  - NMS Captain Romano
  - NMS Major Giurascu
  - NMS Major Sontu
  - NMS Major Gr. Ioan
  - NMS Lt. Calinescu
  - NMS Captain V Maracineanu
- Vedea-class (built in 1894 in Germany, 30 tons, top speed of 10 knots, armed with 1 x 37 mm and two torpedo tubes)
  - NMS Vedea
  - NMS Argeșul
  - NMS Trotușul
  - NMS Teleorman
- Converted from unarmed river craft
  - NMS Bujorescu
  - NMS Catinca

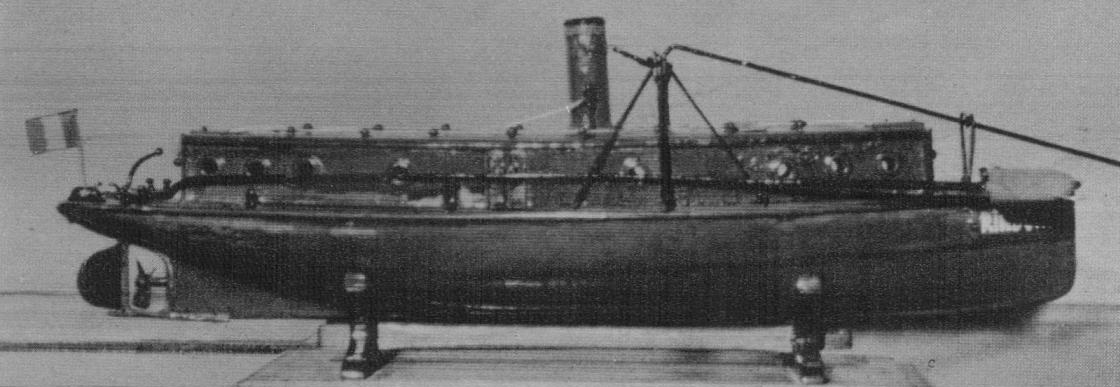
NMS Rândunica

- Converted from old spar torpedo boats
  - NMS Rândunica

== Maritime warships ==
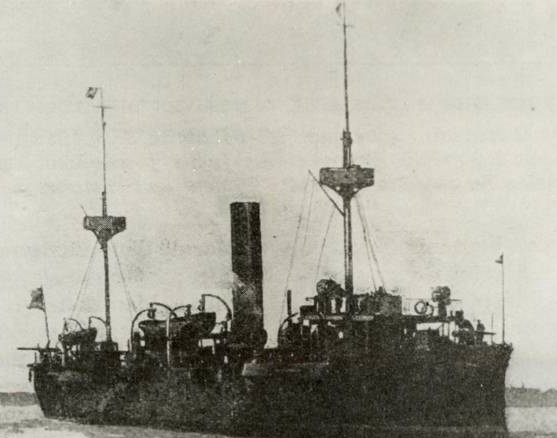
NMS Elisabeta

Cruisers

- NMS Elisabeta

Torpedo boats

- NMS Smeul
- NMS Năluca
- NMS Sborul

Minelayers

- NMS Alexandru cel Bun

Gunboats

- NMS Grivița

Training ships

- NMS Mircea

== Conduct of operations ==
=== Fighting in the Danube ===
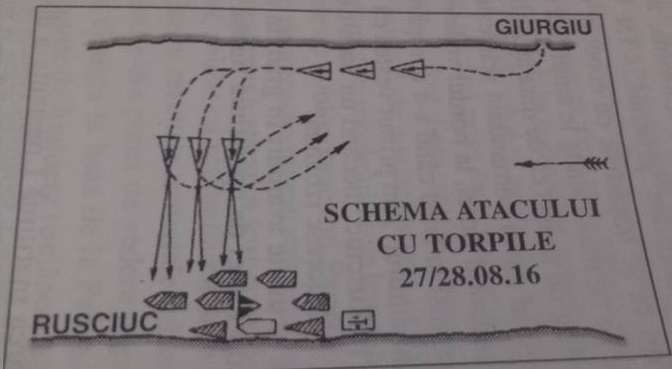
Map of the 27 August 1916 torpedo attack

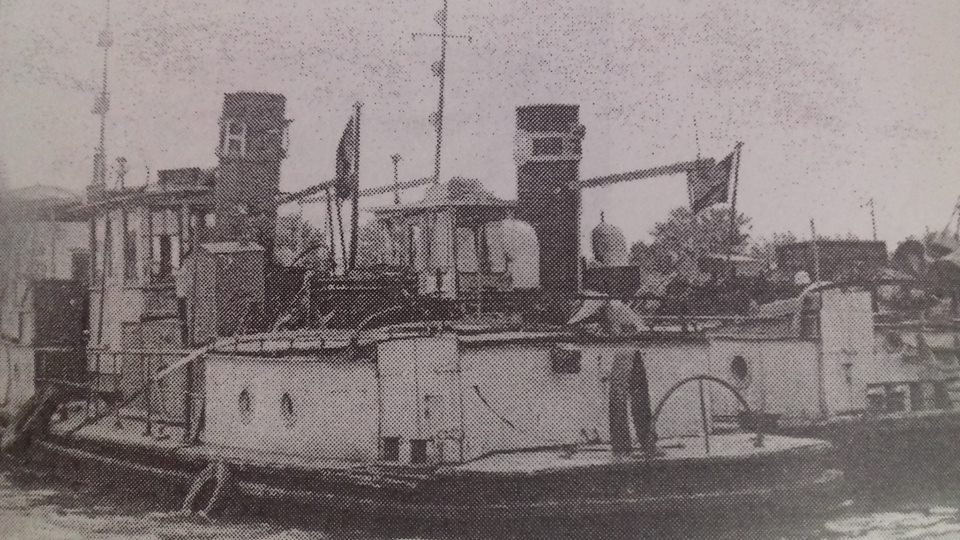
NMS Bujorescu and NMS Catinca

During the night of 27 August 1916, just after Romania declared war on Austria-Hungary, three Romanian small torpedo boats (the old 10-ton Rândunica and the two converted hydraulic service vessels Bujorescu and Catinca, each armed with two torpedoes in wooden tubes) attacked the Austro-Hungarian Danube Flotilla stationed in the Bulgarian port of Ruse, aiming to sink one of the monitors. The attack however failed in its immediate purpose, as only one barge loaded with fuel was sunk. Due to this attack, however, the Austro-Hungarian Danube Flotilla retreated 130 km West along the Danube, stopping at Belene and subsequently taking extensive defensive measures.

The Romanian monitors and river torpedo boats were active all throughout the Battle of Turtucaia, providing artillery support to the ground troops along with the Romanian shore batteries. The Romanian monitors and shore batteries fired at ranges of 5–8 km, disrupting enemy artillery build-up, movement of troops and firing positions, and ultimately causing significant human and material damage. The Navy was the last to withdraw from the battle and the sector it defended was the last one to be captured by the enemy. The only Romanian warship to have suffered significant damage inflicted by the enemy was the river torpedo boat Grigore Ion, when she was sent to silence a group of 10 enemy machine guns which were blocking the evacuation of Romanian troops. She managed to destroy a few of them before withdrawing, having been struck by thousands of bullets, and having half of her crew killed.

The Romanian monitors subsequently took part in the First Battle of Cobadin, making an important contribution to achieving the defensive Romanian-Russian victory. As a consequence of this and previous actions at Turtucaia and elsewhere, German General August von Mackensen decided to eliminate the Romanian monitors. He delegated 7 artillery officers, possessing guns with calibers ranging from 150 mm to 305 mm, to attack and destroy the monitors as they were travelling between Rasova and Oltina on 21 September. The German batteries fired with intensity, but by the end of the day, all that was achieved was minor damage to the monitor Lahovari, which also had 6 wounded. When a German aircraft reported that none of the monitors was sunk, Mackensen dismissed all 7 officers.

During the September–October Flămânda Offensive, the Austro-Hungarian river monitors Bodrog, Körös and Szamos, together with the patrol boat Barsch and one coal barge were damaged by Romanian shore batteries (3 were killed on Barsch) and one large barge loaded with explosives was sunk. Körös was disabled after taking 12 shots, still being in repairs at the time of the armistice on the Romanian front in December 1917; only in April 1918 she became operational once again. No Romanian warships were involved in the operation, but rumors about their arrival caused the Austro-Hungarian warships to flee the scene and return to their base at Belene.

In early November, Russian-Romanian forces in Dobruja started a general offensive to recapture land lost to the Central Powers during the Second Battle of Cobadin. The Romanian Navy contributed to the offensive, with the monitor Catargiu landing 50 marines to occupy the town of Hârșova on 8 November, after it was abandoned by the retreating enemy. On 10 November, supporting the continuing Allied advance, two Romanian river torpedo boats landed troops at Topalu to occupy the village. On 3 December, the Romanian river torpedo boat Căpitan Valter Mărăcineanu was sunk on the Danube by an Austro-Hungarian mine with 1 sailor killed. On 8 December, the Navy joined the ground troops as they started retreating towards the Danube Delta, stopping near Măcin. The Romanian warships spent the last days of 1916 covering the Russians as they retreated North into Russia.

On 3 January 1917, a Romanian river torpedo boat captured 12 German soldiers at Ghecet. Later during the month, the Romanian warships helped evacuate a total of 528 vessels of all types from Galati to the Chilia branch, although the river gunboat Smârdan was sunk by German shore artillery during the evacuation, with 3 killed. The monitor Catargiu was also damaged and also had 3 killed.

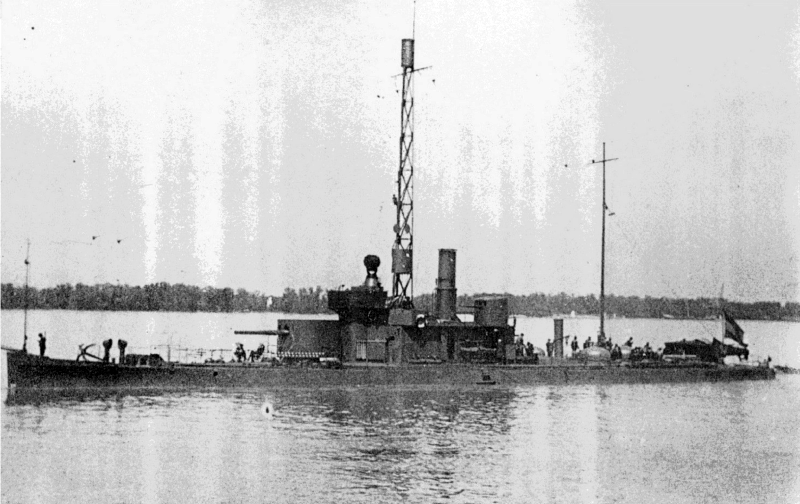
SMS Inn

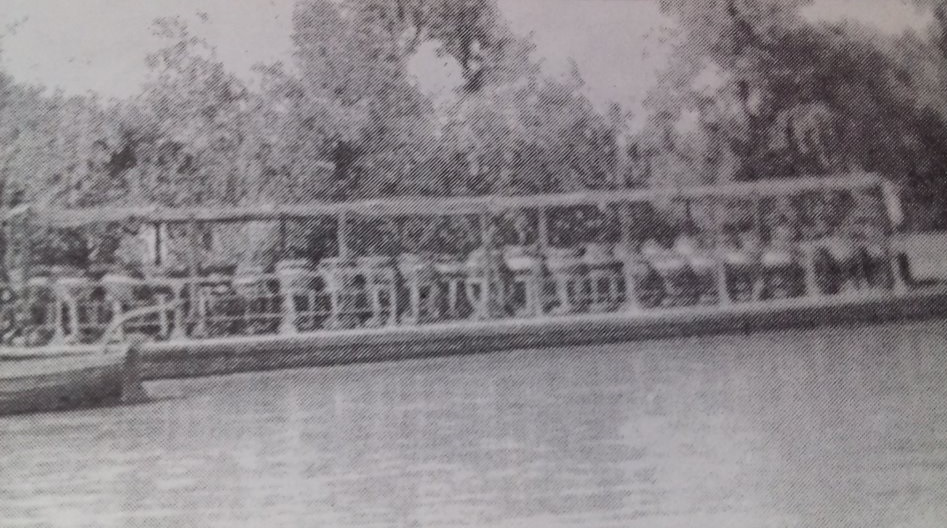
Romanian minelaying pontoon

After a winter of relative inactivity, the Romanian Navy took some defensive measures as well as performing warship upgrades, the monitors were fitted to fire French 120 mm rounds, which gave their main guns a range of up to 11 km. In July 1917, the Romanian monitors took part in an intense bombardment of Bulgarian-occupied Tulcea. The bombardment caused significant losses, the monitors fired until all enemy artillery batteries in and around the city were silenced, despite suffering light damage themselves.

On 22 September, the Romanian Navy achieved one of its greatest success of the war, when the Austro-Hungarian river monitor SMS Inn struck a Romanian mine and sank near Brăila. Two people aboard were killed: the chief of staff of the Austro-Hungarian Danube Flotilla and one telegraphist.

The last action of the Romanian Navy during the War took place after Romania re-declared war on the Central Powers on 10 November 1918. In the early hours of 11 November, hours before the Allied Armistice with Germany was signed, the monitor Kogălniceanu together with the river torpedo boat Trotușul supported the blood-less occupation of Brăila, after the Germans retreated from the city. The Romanians captured 77 assorted German vessels abandoned in the city's port.

== See also ==
- List of battles of the Romanian Navy
