= Romanian Danube Flotilla =

River Flotilla "Mihail Kogălniceanu"
- Flotila Fluvială "Mihail Kogălniceanu"
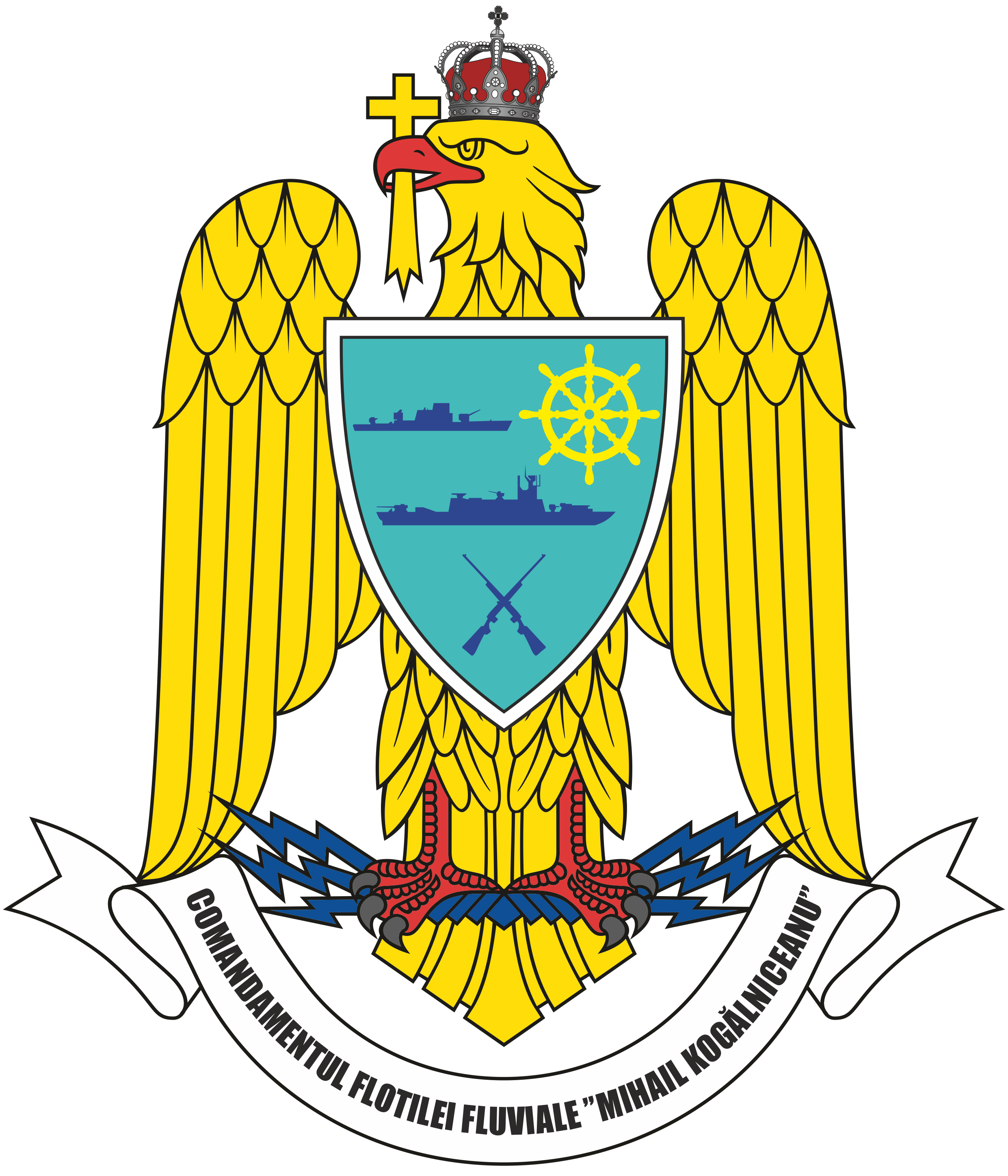
- Insignia of the Flotilla Command
- Active: 22 October 1860–present
- Country: Romania
- Branch: Romanian Naval Forces
- Type: Brown-water navy
- Garrison/HQ: Brăila, Tulcea
- Engagements: Romanian War of Independence; Second Balkan War; World War I World War II

Commanders
- Current commander: Commander Fănel Rădulescu
- Notable commanders: Vice-Admiral Constantin Bălescu

The Romanian Danube Flotilla (Romanian: Flotila Dunării Românească) is the brown-water naval branch of the Romanian Naval Forces, responsible for patrolling and defending the Romanian stretch of the Danube River. It is the oldest extant naval force on the Danube, established in 1860 alongside the Romanian navy. It saw service during most of the wars involving Romania, and was the most powerful river naval force in the world during the interwar period.

Initially composed of early steam-powered vessels and trawlers amassed via the unification of the Wallachian and Moldavian fleets, the force was gradually expanded to meet defensive and operational needs along the Danube. The flotilla saw action during the Romanian War of Independence, the Second Balkan War, World War I and World War II. Between the world wars, the flotilla reached its zenith, becoming the most capable river flotilla in the world, equipped with state-of-the-art river monitors, gunboats and patrol-craft. Following World War II and several reorganisations, it was restructured as the Danube Flotilla Command, consolidating command and modernisation. It is currently headquartered in Brăila.

== Beginning ==
The Romanian Danube Flotilla was formed on 22 October 1860 by order of Domnitor Alexandru Ioan Cuza after merging the naval components of Wallachia and Moldavia. The unit was called the Danube Flotilla Corps and was headquartered in Ismail. During the 1877-1878 Romanian War of Independence, the Flotilla consisted of two armed steamers (one paddle steamer and one yacht), one purpose-built gunboat armed with one gun (Fulgerul) and one spar torpedo boat (Rândunica) as well as several coastal batteries. The Flotilla's main success of the war was the sinking of the Ottoman monitor Seyfi by the torpedo boat Rândunica.

With the expansion of the Romanian Navy, King Carol I promulgated the decree for the organization of the flotilla in 1896. According to this decree, the navy was organized in the Sea Division (Divizia de Mare), and the Danube Division (Divizia de Dunăre). The crew depot and the Navy Arsenal were also established. The first organization act of the Danube Division was issued on 1 April 1896.

== Pre-World War I expansion ==
=== 1882 ===
The Romanian Danube Flotilla in the early 1910s
	Number of units
River monitors	4
Torpedo boats	15
Gunboats	10
Minelayers	1

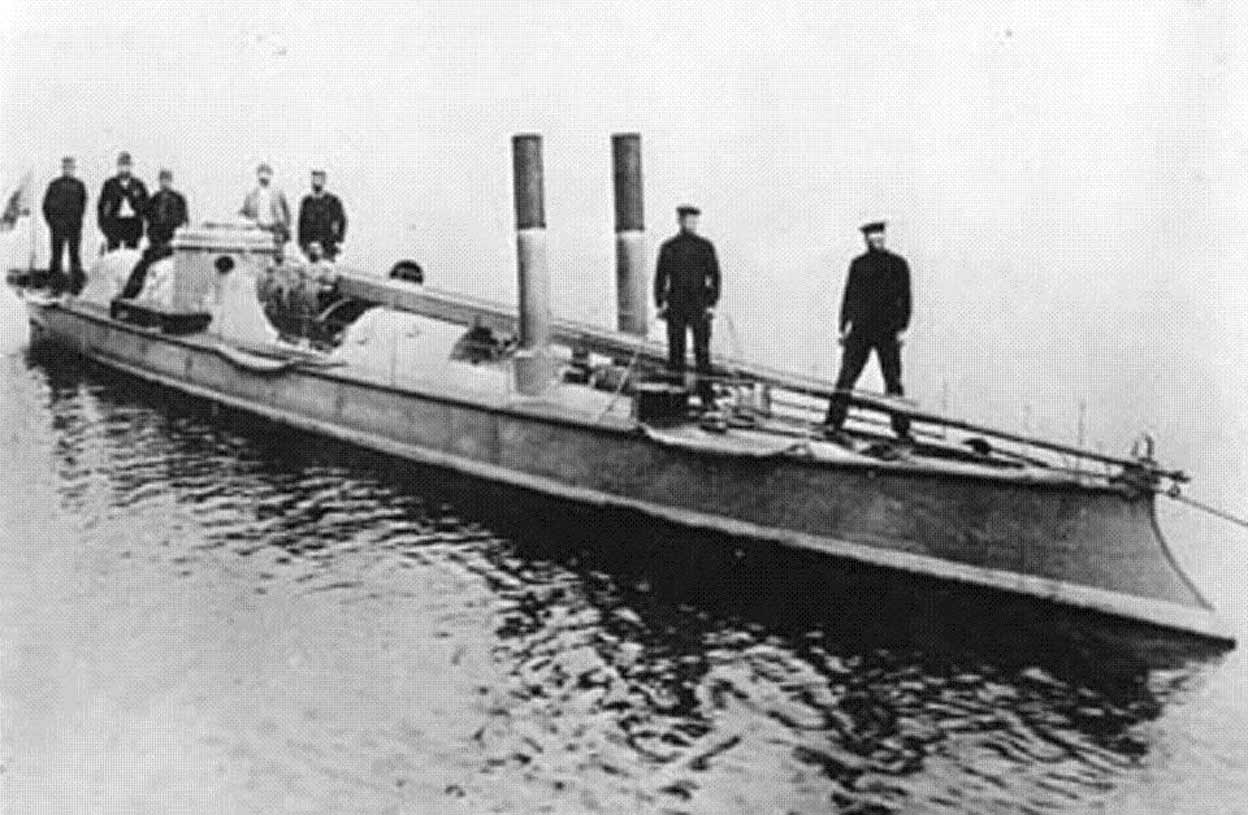
NMS Șoimul

The first expansion of the Romanian Danube Flotilla took place in 1882. Two armored torpedo boats, Șoimul and Vulturul, were purchased from Yarrow in Britain, where Rândunica was also built seven years prior. These boats had a displacement of 12 tons, measuring 19 meters in length, with a beam of 2.5 meters and a draught of 1 meter. Power plant consisted of one 150 hp steam engine generating a top speed of 16.5 knots. Each boat had a crew of 8 and was armed with a single spar torpedo. Aside from increased dimensions and greater speed, the two boats were also fitted with bulletproof armour. These two boats were followed by three Rahova-class gunboats, also built in Britain at Thames Iron Works. With a displacement of 45 tons and a top speed of 8.5 knots, these small gunboats were each armed with one 37 mm gun and one machine gun. Also commissioned in 1882 was the 104-ton guard ship Alexandru cel Bun. The latter was used as a minelayer during the First World War. She measured 23 meters in length, with a beam of 4.6 meters and a draught of 1.5 meters. She was powered by 100 hp steam machinery, giving her a top speed of 9 knots, and could carry 12 tons of coal. Her crew amounted to 20 and her armament consisted of two 37 mm guns and two machine guns.

=== 1888 ===
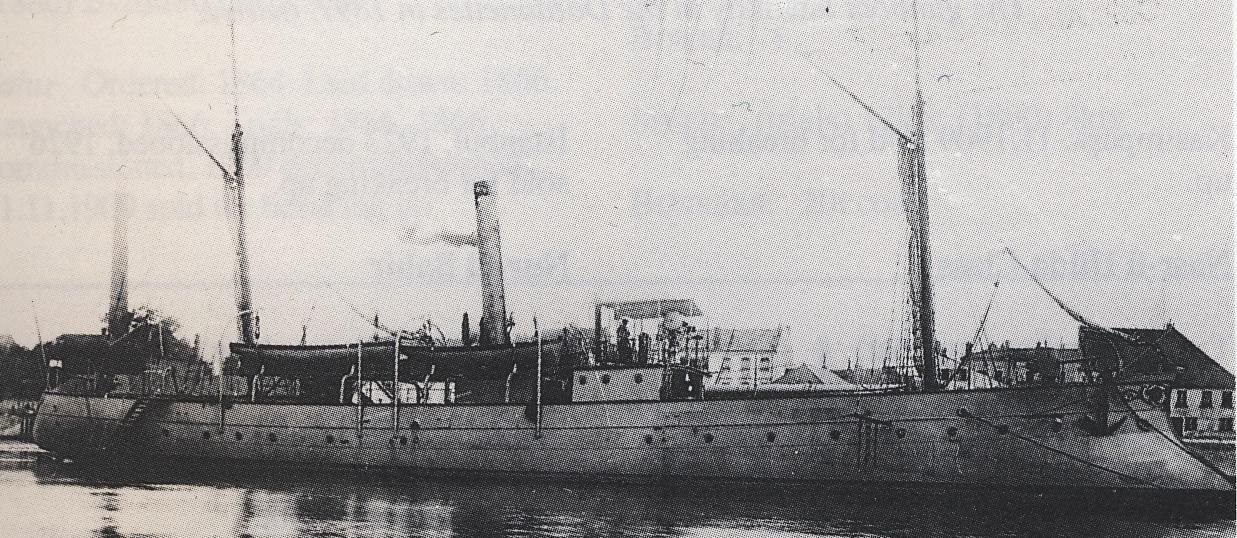
Bistrița-class gunboat

The second expansion of the Flotilla took place in 1888, when three 116-ton Bistrița-class gunboats were commissioned. These vessels measured 30.5 meters in length, with a beam of 4.1 meters and a draught of 1.7 meters. They were also built by Thames Iron Works and each was armed with one 57 mm gun and one 37 mm gun. Crewed by 30 men each, they had a top speed of 13 knots generated by 380 hp steam propulsion, carrying a maximum of 12 tons of coal.

=== 1893-1894 ===
Two consecutive expansions followed in the 1890s. In 1893, three 95-ton guard ships of unknown origin were commissioned. Each was armed with one 57 mm gun and two 37 mm guns, having a top speed of 13.5 knots. A further expansion followed in 1894, when four German-made torpedo boats were commissioned. Known as the Vedea-class, they were built at Schichau-Werke, having a displacement of 30 tons, measuring 20 meters in length, with a beam of 3 meters and a draught of 1.5 meters. Each boat had a crew of 16 and a top speed of 10 knots. Armament consisted of one 37 mm Hotchkiss revolving gun, one machine gun and two spar torpedoes.

=== 1906-1908 ===
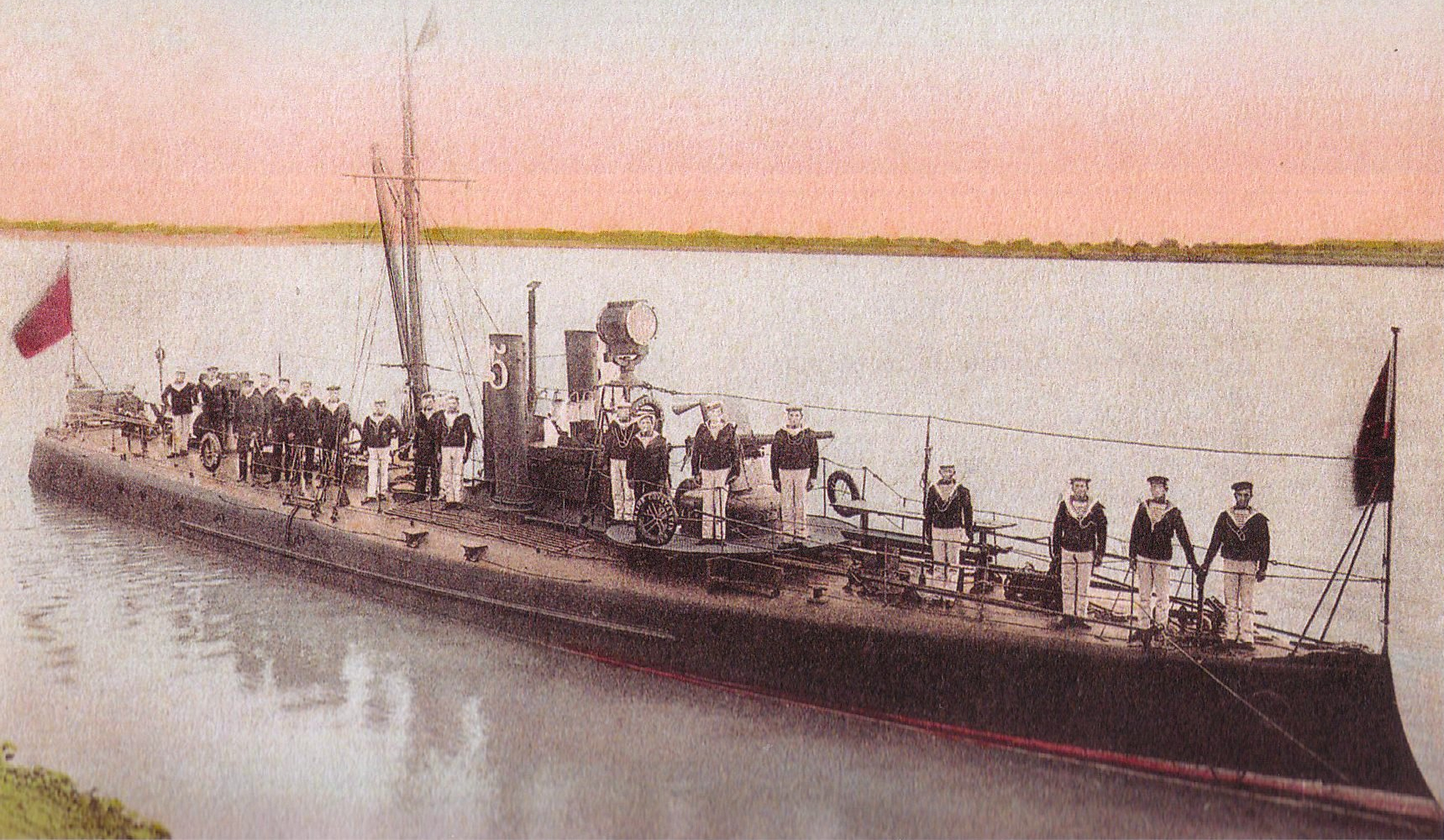
One of the 8 fifty-ton torpedo boats

This was by far the greatest pre-war expansion of the Romanian Danube Flotilla. Between 1906 and 1907, a class of 8 British-built torpedo gunboats was commissioned. These 50-ton vessels, built by Thames Iron Works, were well-armed for their size: in addition to one 47 mm naval gun and one 6.5 mm machine gun, each boat also carried 4 torpedoes: two on spars in front of the vessel and two more amidships in torpedo dropping gear (carriages). They measured 30 meters in length, with a beam of 4 meters and a draught of less than 1 meter. These boats were also armored, having bulletproof sides and deck. They were powered by two compound engines powering two shafts, resulting in an output of 550 hp and a top speed of 18 knots. They could carry up to 7.6 tons of oil and had a crew of up to 20. Between 1907 and 1908, four large river monitors were commissioned (Brătianu class). They were built in sections at STT in Austria-Hungary. Their sections were then transported to the Galați shipyard in Romania, where they were assembled and launched. Standard displacement amounted to 680 tons, increasing to 750 tons at full load. Each monitor measured 63.5 meters in length, with a beam of 10.3 meters and a draught of 1.6 meters. Power plant consisted of two engines and two Yarrow boilers powering two shafts, generating a total of 1,800 hp which resulted in a top speed of 13 knots. The monitors had a crew of 110 and a range of 1,500 nautical miles at a speed of 9.7 knots. Armor thickness reached 70–75 mm on the belt, deck, turrets and conning tower. Armament during World War I consisted of three 120 mm Škoda naval guns in independent armored turrets, one 120 mm Škoda naval howitzer, four 47 mm Škoda naval guns and two 6.5 mm Romanian-made Maxim machine guns.

The first campaign of the Brătianu monitors was the Second Balkan War in 1913. During the war, the ships protected the Cernavodă Bridge and aided in the crossing of the Danube. The monitors also ensured the protection of the pontoon bridges and the transport ships during the campaign.

== World War I ==
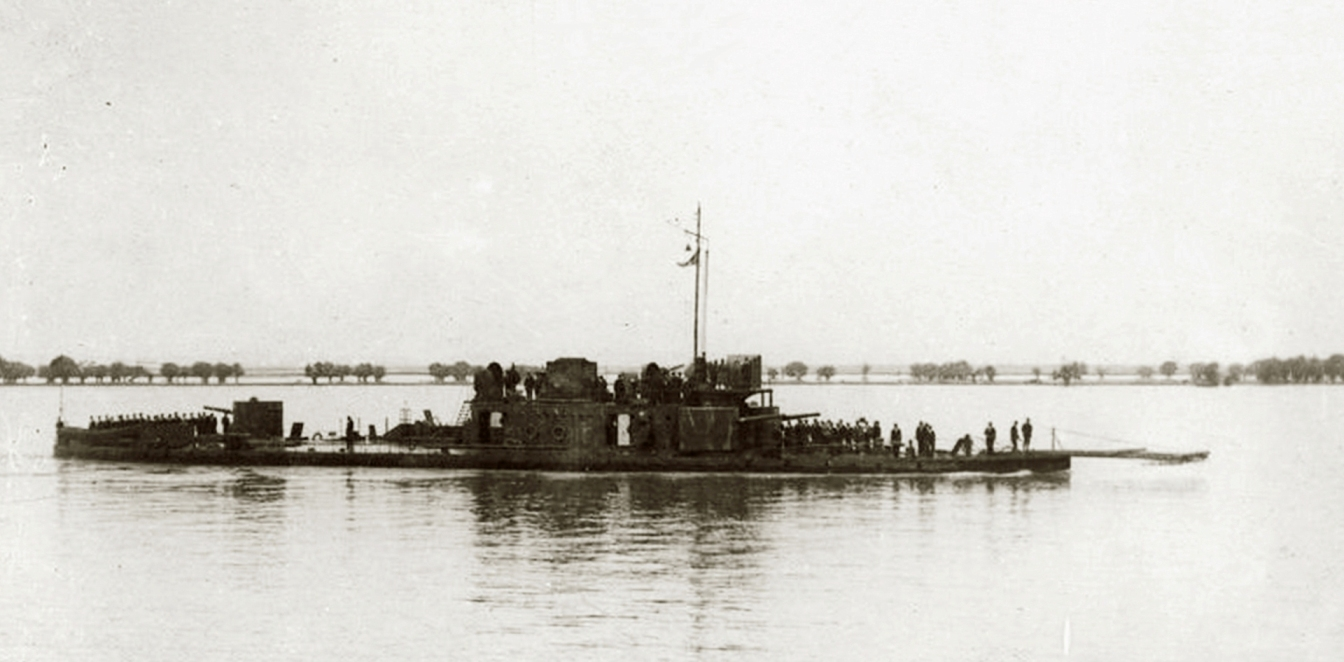
Romanian river monitor in 1917

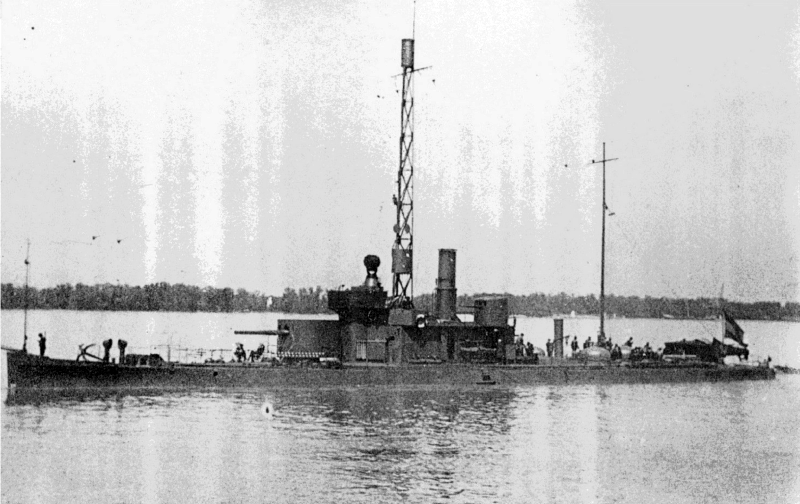
SMS Inn

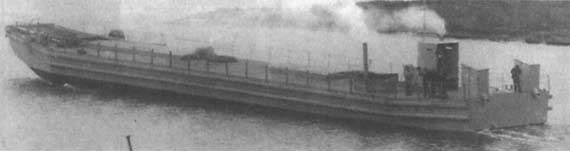
Russud-class landing craft

During the First World War, the Romanian Danube Flotilla was deployed in coordinated operations with the Romanian Army, which prevented the Central Powers from advancing into the Danube Delta. The Flotilla made a significant contribution to the Battle of Turtucaia and later carried out the safe evacuation of the Romanian 9th division from the besieged city. During the summer and fall of 1917, in conjunction with the artillery of the ground troops, the Flotilla held the line against renewed German offensive in Moldavia. Throughout the 1917 operations, the artillery of the four monitors bombarded enemy naval positions scoring notable successes, under the skillful command of the Romanian Vice-Admiral Constantin Bălescu.

One of the more notable naval engagements fought on the Danube took place during the night of 27 August 1916, just after Romania joined the war. A group of three Romanian torpedo boats, led by Rândunica, attacked the Austro-Hungarian Danube Flotilla stationed in the Bulgarian port of Ruse, which consisted of five monitors and four armed river boats. The objective was to sink one of the monitors, but the attack failed in its immediate purpose, as only one barge loaded with fuel was sunk (by Rândunica, commanded by Captain Niculescu Rizea) and a quay was damaged by another torpedo. Due to this attack, however, the Austro-Hungarian Danube Flotilla (Commander Karl Lucich) retreated 130 km (81 miles) west along the Danube, stopping at Belene and subsequently taking extensive defensive measures. The three crewmen of Rândunica were received as heroes in Bucharest, and the retreated Austro-Hungarian warships were prevented from interfering in the subsequent battle of Turtucaia.

One of the eight 50-ton Romanian torpedo boats was sunk by a mine at the end of 1916. On 22 September 1917, Romania achieved its greatest naval success of the war, when the Austro-Hungarian river monitor SMS Inn struck a Romanian mine and sank near Brăila. She was later salvaged, but was still undergoing repairs when the war ended.

In February 1918, after the start of the Russian Civil War, Romanian forces in the Danube estuary captured one Bolshevik Russud-class landing craft. The Flotilla also participated in the Battle of Galați with four torpedo gunboats, a torpedo boat and a motorboat.

Tonnage lost	Tonnage gained	Enemy tonnage loss inflicted
50 tons (1 torpedo boat)	250 tons (1 landing craft)	~1,000 tons (1 river monitor, 1 landing craft, 1 barge)

== Interwar and World War II ==
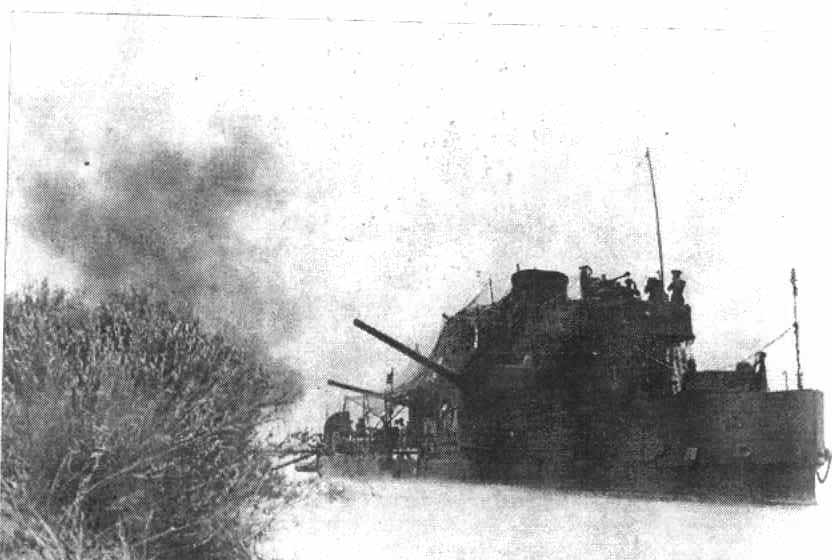
The Romanian monitor Mihail Kogălniceanu in 1941

At the start of the 1920s, the Flotilla consisted of the four fore-mentioned monitors, plus three more received as war reparations from the former Austro-Hungarian Navy: Basarabia, Bucovina and Ardeal. As of 1941, these three monitors displaced between 450 and 550 tons and each was armed with two 120 mm guns. Six M-class patrol boats were also acquired from Italy. The seven remaining 50-ton torpedo boats were still in use, although three were relegated to border patrol by the end of the Interwar, their armament reduced to one machine gun. The three Oltul-class gunboats were still in service, and would remain so throughout the Second World War. These additions made the Romanian Danube Flotilla the most powerful river fleet in the world until World War II. The minelayer Alexandru cel Bun was only scrapped in the 1930s. Under the command of Rear Admiral Gavrilescu Anastasie, the Flotilla made an important contribution to the suppression of the 1924 Tatarbunary Uprising.

During the first month of Operation Barbarossa, the Flotilla fought several engagements against its Soviet counterpart, damaging two Soviet monitors and two patrol boats and sinking another patrol boat. The Romanian monitor Mihail Kogălniceanu also shot down one Soviet aircraft on 29 June 1941. Wartime additions to the Flotilla amounted to two small Czechoslovak-built minelayers (transferred from the Kriegsmarine). After the 23 August 1944 coup, the river monitors of the Flotilla prevented German troops from crossing the Danube from Bulgaria and also captured German ships along the river between 24 August and 31 August. Ardeal and Lahovary captured 26 ships, while Basarabia and Bucovina captured 82 ships and a medical convoy.

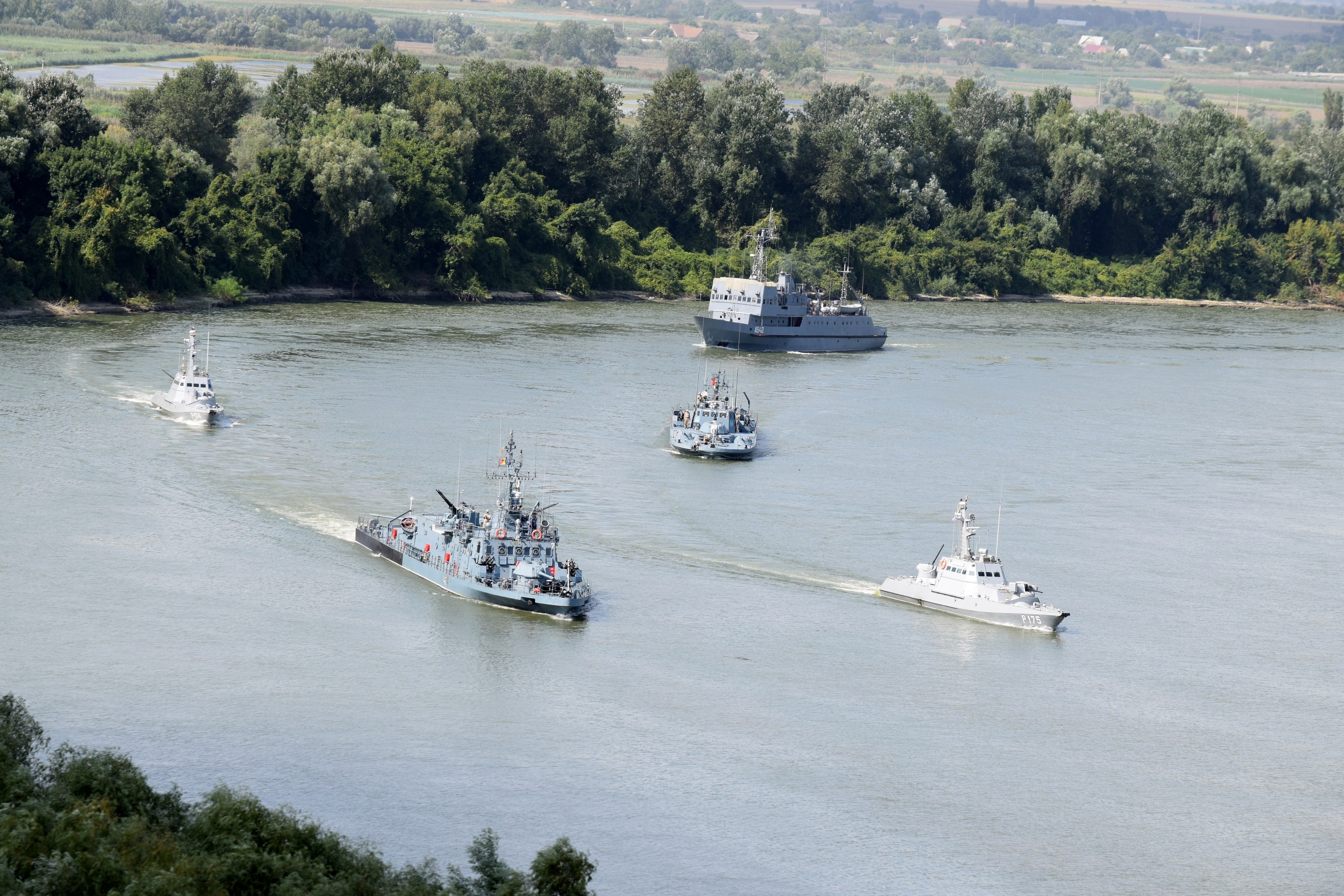
Romanian monitors of the Danube Flotilla and Ukrainian ships during the Riverine 2018 exercise

== The Flotilla today ==
Today, the flotilla is divided between the 67th Artillery Carrying Ships Divizion "Commander Virgil Alexandru Dragalina" and the 88th River Patrol Boat Divizion "Amiral Gheorghe Sandu" with the Flotilla Command being headquartered at Brăila. The 67th Divizion is divided in two section: Section I – Monitors and Section II – Patrol Boats, both headquartered at Brăila. The 88th Division is divided in two sections, one located at Brăila, the other at Tulcea. The 307th Marine Infantry Regiment "Heracleea" is also subordinated to the flotilla.

The Flotilla comprises three Mihail Kogălniceanu-class river monitors and five Smârdan-class armored patrol ships (Vedete Blindate Fluviale). Other ships include 12 VD 141 patrol boats (Vedete Dragoare - minesweeper patrol boats) and two ESM12 fast intervention motorboats.
