= Second Romanian campaign of World War I =

1918 military operation

- Part of Eastern Front of World War I
Date	10–11 November 1918
Location	Bukovina, Brăila
Result	Romanian victory

Belligerents
Germany Austria-Hungary	Romania

Commanders and leaders
(German Empire) August von Mackensen	(Kingdom of Romania) Ferdinand I

Strength
Unknown	10 divisions 2 warships

Casualties and losses
77 assorted German vessels were captured	None

The second Romanian campaign of World War I was one of the shortest military operations of the war, taking place during the last two days of the war, 10 and 11 November 1918. With no significant battles, it yielded important territorial as well as material gains for the Romanians, and was a prelude to the Hungarian–Romanian War, which would start two days later, on 13 November.

== Background ==
The First Romanian Campaign ended in victory for the Central Powers, forcing Romania to sign the Treaty of Bucharest and drop out of the war in May 1918. This treaty was deeply resented by the Romanians.

But after Bulgaria had capitulated on 29 September 1918, the French-led Army of the Danube under of Henri Mathias Berthelot, traveled unopposed under armistice terms through Bulgaria by rail towards Romania. By the end of October, they had reached Pleven, Veliko Tarnovo and Ruse on the Bulgarian-Romanian border. There was still a large German-Austrian-Hungarian occupation force present in Romania under command of August von Mackensen. By early November however, it was clear the war was lost and the occupation force marched home towards Hungary, and the French crossed the Danube at Svishtov and Nikopol. These events motivated Romania to re-declare war on the Central Powers on 10 November 1918.

== Course of the campaign ==
=== Northern front ===
On the northern front, Romanian troops occupied Austrian Bukovina, entering the capital Czernowitz on 11 November.

=== Southern front ===
In the morning of 11 November, three hours before the Allied Armistice with Germany was signed, the Romanian monitor Mihail Kogălniceanu, together with the 30-ton river torpedo boat Trotușul, recovered the port of Brăila after the Germans retreated from the city. The two Romanian warships captured 77 assorted German vessels abandoned in the city's port (barges, tankers, tugs, floating cranes, and motorboats).
