= Danube Delta Campaign =

- Part of the Eastern Front of World War II
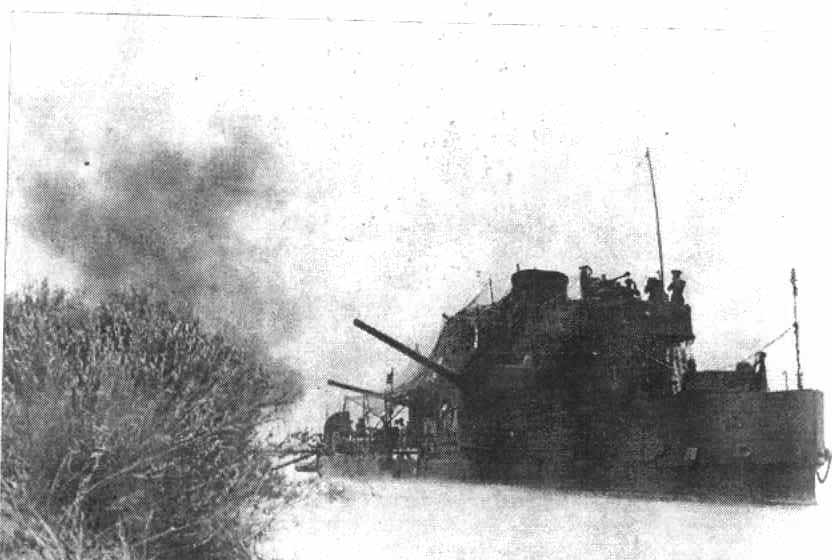
- The Romanian monitor Mihail Kogălniceanu in 1941
Date	22–26 June 1941
Location	Chilia branch of the Danube Delta
Result	Romanian victory

Belligerents
(Kingdom of Romania) Romania	Soviet Union

Commanders and leaders
(Kingdom of Romania) Eugeniu Roșca	(Soviet Union) Alexander Frolov

Strength
2 river monitors 4 torpedo gunboats	3 river monitors 5+ patrol boats

Casualties and losses
None	3 monitors damaged 2 patrol boats sunk 3 patrol boats damaged 1 tug damaged 1 barge sunk

The Danube Delta Campaign was a series of naval engagements between the Soviet Danube Flotilla and its Romanian counterpart in late June 1941, during the first days of Operation Barbarossa.

== Background ==
After annexing Bessarabia and Northern Bukovina from Romania in the summer of 1940, the Soviet Union gained a border on the Danube. The Soviets created a new flotilla on the Danube, which was formed of ships transferred from the Dnieper Flotilla. The new Danube Flotilla consisted of five monitors (armed with 102 mm and 130 mm guns), twenty-two armored boats, and five transports, supported by an anti-aircraft battalion, fighter and bomber squadrons, a rifle company, a machine gun company, a naval infantry company, and eight shore batteries (two 152 mm, one 130 mm, one 122 mm, one 76 mm, and three 45 mm gun batteries).

Romania joined Operation Barbarossa and declared war on the Soviet Union on 22 June 1941, launching attacks against Soviet airfields in Bessarabia and destroying numerous aircraft on the ground. The Romanian Danube Flotilla consisted of four Brătianu-class monitors (Ion C. Brătianu, Lascăr Catargiu, Mihail Kogălniceanu and Alexandru Lahovari), three ex-Austro-Hungarian monitors (Ardeal, Basarabia and Bucovina) and various other ships. The Romanian Flotilla was supported by aircraft of the Royal Romanian Air Force in artillery spotting.

== The engagements ==
The first Soviet-Romanian naval engagement occurred on 22 June 1941, the first day of Operation Barbarossa, when one Soviet monitor and one patrol boat attacked the port-city of Tulcea. The Romanian river monitors Basarabia and the Brătianu-class Mihail Kogălniceanu repulsed the attack, sinking the patrol boat.

The main naval engagement on the Danube occurred on the following day, when the Romanian Tulcea Tactical Group (Basarabia, Mihail Kogălniceanu and four patrol boats) repelled another attack of the Soviet Danube Flotilla, damaging two monitors and two patrol boats and one tug. The Romanian monitors then counterattacked at Reni, sinking one patrol boat and one barge and damaging another Soviet monitor.

The last naval engagement on the Danube occurred on 26 June, when two Romanian torpedo gunboats, V1 and V3, engaged three Soviet patrol boats, setting one of them on fire and forcing all three to retreat.

== Aftermath ==
Despite these defeats, the Soviet Danube Flotilla continued to support ground forces in bridgeheads and landing operations, and also fought numerous artillery duels with the Romanian Land Forces during and in the days prior to Operation München. Artillery duels with the Romanian Flotilla also continued until 9/10 July when the Soviet ships retreated to Izmail. The Soviets retreated completely from the Chilia branch of the Danube on 20 July.

The Romanian monitors also fought against the Red Army troops, shelling Soviet artillery positions in the Reni-Giurgiulești sector, with the positions near Giurgiulești shelled on 8 and 14 July.

== See also ==
- Black Sea campaigns (1941–1944)
