= NMS Mihail Kogălniceanu =

Romanian river monitor

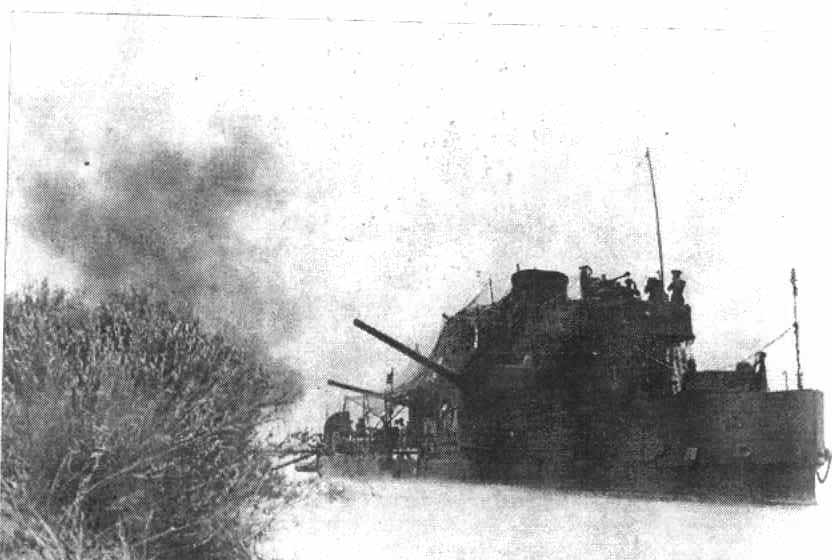
- Mihail Kogălniceanu in 1941

History

Romania
- Name: Mihail Kogălniceanu
- Namesake: Mihail Kogălniceanu
- Builder: STT, Austria-Hungary; Galați shipyard, Romania (assembly)
- Laid down: 1907
- Launched: 1907
- Completed: 1907
- Commissioned: 1907
- Decommissioned: 1957
- Fate: Scrapped in 1959
- Notes: Sunk by Soviet aircraft, 24 August 1944. Refloated in 1956.

Service record
- Commanders: Constantin Miclescu (World War I); Horia Macellariu (late 1930s)
- Operations: Romanian Navy during World War I; Battle of Turtucaia; First Battle of Cobadin; Operation Barbarossa; Danube Delta Campaign; Operation München
- Victories: Second Balkan War: Contribution to the scuttling of 4 gunboats; World War I: 77 vessels captured; World War II: 1 barge possibly sunk; 2 monitors and possibly 1 armored motor gunboat damaged; 1 aircraft destroyed

General characteristics
- Class & type: Brătianu-class river monitor
- Displacement: 680 tonnes (670 long tons) (standard); 750 tonnes (740 long tons) (full load)
- Length: 63.5 m (208 ft)
- Beam: 10.3 m (34 ft)
- Draft: 1.6 m (5.2 ft)
- Propulsion: 2 engines, 2 Yarrow boilers, 2 shafts, 1,800 hp (1,300 kW)
- Speed: 13 knots (24 km/h; 15 mph)
- Range: 1,500 nmi (2,800 km; 1,700 mi)
- Complement: 110
- Armament: World War I: 3 x 120 mm (4.7 in)/L35 Škoda naval guns; 2 x 120 mm (4.7 in)/L10 howitzers; 4 x 47 mm (1.9 in)/L44 Škoda guns; 2 x 6.5 mm (0.26 in) Maxim machine guns; World War II: 3 x 120 mm (4.7 in)/L50 Škoda-Bofors naval guns; 1 x 76 mm (3.0 in) naval/AA gun; 2 x 47 mm (1.9 in)/L44 Škoda guns; 2 x 6.5 mm (0.26 in) Maxim machine guns; 1 x 760 mm (30 in) depth charge thrower; 1 x 700 mm (28 in) depth charge thrower
- Armor: Belt: 70 mm (2.8 in); Turrets: 75 mm (3.0 in); Deck: 20–75 mm (0.79–2.95 in); Conning tower: 70–75 mm (2.8–3.0 in); bulkheads: 60 mm (2.4 in)

NMS Mihail Kogălniceanu was a Brătianu-class river monitor of the Romanian Navy. She saw service in both world wars, being the most successful vessel in her class of four ships. Like her three sisters, she was initially built as a river monitor, but in early 1918, she was converted to a sea-going monitor. During the Second Balkan War, she supported the Romanian crossing of the Danube into Bulgaria. During World War I, she carried out numerous bombardments against the Central Powers forces advancing along the shore of the Danube and carried out the last action of the Romanian Navy before the 11 November 1918 armistice. She later fought successfully against Bolshevik naval forces during the early months of the Russian Civil War, helping secure the Budjak region.

During the interwar period, she contributed to the suppression of the Tatarbunary Uprising and was rearmed with longer main guns towards the end of the 1930s. During World War II, she fought several engagements against the Soviet Navy in the first month of the Eastern Front, but was ultimately sunk by Soviet aircraft shortly after Romania ceased hostilities against the Soviet Union, on 24 August 1944. She was refloated in 1956 and scrapped in 1959.

== Construction and specifications ==
Mihail Kogălniceanu was part of a class of four river monitors built in Austria-Hungary for the Romanian Navy (four more ships of this class were planned but not laid down). Like her three sisters, she was built in sections at STT in Austria-Hungary in 1907. Her sections were then transported to the Galați shipyard in Romania, where she was assembled and launched. Her standard displacement amounted to 680 tons, increasing to 750 tons when fully loaded. She measured 63.5 meters in length, with a beam of 10.3 meters and a draught of 1.6 meters. Her power plant consisted of two engines and two Yarrow boilers powering two shafts, generating a total of 1,800 hp which gave her a top speed of 13 knots. She had a crew of 110 and a range of 1,500 nautical miles at a speed of 9.7 knots. Her armor thickness reached 70–75 mm on the belt, deck, turrets and conning tower. Her armament during World War I consisted of three 120 mm Škoda naval guns in independent armored turrets, one 120 mm Škoda naval howitzer, four 47 mm Škoda naval guns and two 6.5 mm Romanian-made Maxim machine guns. She was modernized in 1937–1938, her three 120 mm Škoda guns being replaced by three longer 120 mm Škoda-Bofors naval guns. During World War II, she was armed with three 120 mm Škoda-Bofors naval guns, one 76 mm anti-aircraft gun, two 47 mm Škoda naval guns and two machine guns. She and her three sisters were also fitted for service at sea as anti-submarine escorts, each one of them being armed with two depth charge throwers (one of 700 mm and one of 760 mm).

In early 1918, Mihail Kogălniceanu was converted to a coastal monitor. Her bow was fitted with a breakwater, the distribution of her inner cargo was evened to prevent listing, her deck was made waterproof and more instruments required for sea navigation were brought from the cruiser Elisabeta. By the beginning of March 1918, the monitor was ready to sail at sea.

Her three sisters (Alexandru Lahovari, Ion C. Brătianu, and Lascăr Catargiu) had varying fates: one was sunk on 24 August 1944 by Soviet aircraft while the other two were taken over by the Soviet Navy and served until the 1950s.

== Second Balkan War ==
During the Second Balkan War, Romanian ground forces crossed the Danube and invaded Bulgaria. During the war, Mihail Kogălniceanu was part of the group of ships ferrying Romanian troops from Corabia to the Bulgarian shore. In response to the Romanian invasion, the Bulgarian Navy scuttled its four Danube gunboats to prevent them from being captured. The four gunboats were 400–600 ton vessels, with a top speed of 11 knots and armed with two-to-four 75 mm guns and two-to-four 47 mm guns. They were still present on the Bulgarian Navy list in August 1916.

== World War I ==
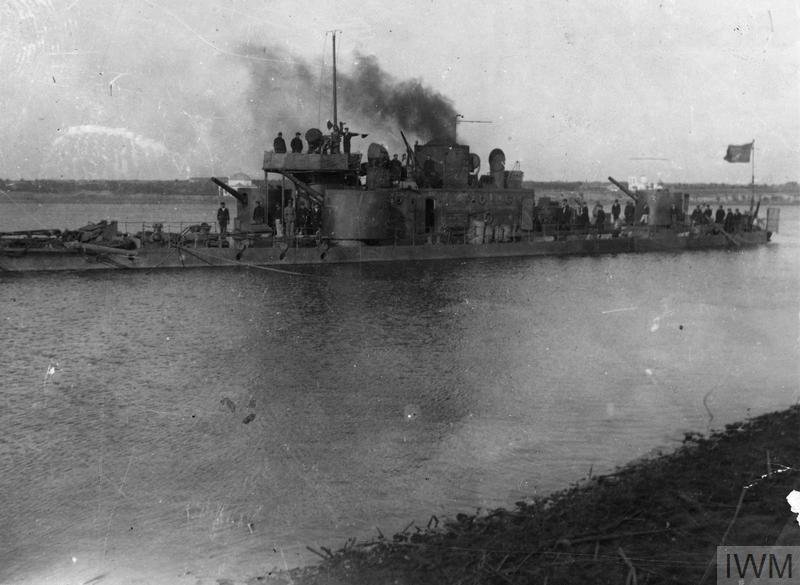
Mihail Kogălniceanu in 1916-17

When Romania entered World War I in 1916, Mihail Kogălniceanu was commanded by Captain Constantin Miclescu.

She and her three sisters took part in the Battle of Turtucaia. The four warships kept Bulgarian and German ground forces under a powerful and accurate barrage of fire, allowing thousands of Romanian troops to escape the encircled city. She was especially active in the last two days of the battle, 5 and 6 September 1916.

The Romanian monitors contributed significantly to the Romanian-Russian victory during the First Battle of Cobadin. As a consequence of this and previous actions at Turtucaia and elsewhere, German General August von Mackensen decided to eliminate the Romanian monitors. He delegated 7 artillery officers, possessing guns with calibers ranging from 150 mm to 305 mm, to attack and destroy the monitors as they were travelling between Rasova and Oltina on 21 September. The German batteries fired with intensity, but by the end of the day, all that was achieved was minor damage to one of her sisters, the monitor Alexandru Lahovari, which also had 6 wounded. When a German aircraft reported at the end of the day that none of the monitors had been sunk, Mackensen dismissed all 7 officers.

At the start of October, rumors about approaching Romanian river monitors caused the Austro-Hungarian naval forces to retreat, thus putting an end to the Battle of Flămânda.

In December, she and the rest of the Romanian Danube Flotilla retreated to the Danube Delta, in the aftermath of a Central Powers offensive that conquered almost all of Southern Romania. On 21 December, she and one of her sisters supported a Russian advance against the Bulgarian lines. The two warships fired a powerful barrage of fire against the Bulgarian-occupied villages of Cerna and Piatra Roșie, and the German-occupied Satul Nou. Under intense fire from the Romanian monitors, the Bulgarians temporarily retreated, but soon returned to their positions after the Russians failed to take the offensive. In the last days of 1916, Mihail Kogălniceanu was at Ismail, covering the vessels which were ferrying the Russians North across the Chilia branch.

After a winter of relative inactivity, the Romanian Navy took some defensive measures as well as performing warship upgrades, the monitors being fitted to fire French 120 mm rounds, which gave their main guns a range of up to 11 km (6.8 mi). In July 1917, the Romanian monitors took part in an intense bombardment of Bulgarian-occupied Tulcea. The bombardment caused significant losses, and the monitors fired until all enemy artillery batteries in and around the city were silenced, suffering light damage themselves. The bombardment lasted several days, and on the last day, 26 July, Mihail Kogălniceanu was struck and damaged by a howitzer shell. She had no casualties, but this for her was the baptism of fire.

She carried out the last action of the Romanian Navy during the war, which took place after Romania re-declared war on the Central Powers on 10 November 1918. In the morning of 11 November, three hours before the Allied Armistice with Germany was signed, the monitor, together with the 30-ton river torpedo boat Trotușul, occupied the port of Brăila, after the Germans retreated from the city. The two Romanian warships captured 77 assorted German vessels abandoned in the city's port (barges, tankers, tugs, floating cranes, motorboats).

== Interwar ==
In 1924, Mihail Kogălniceanu took part in the suppression of the Tatarbunary Uprising, along with other warships of the Romanian Navy. The Romanian vessels captured at Periprava numerous rebels as well as significant quantities of weapons and munitions.

Notably, in the late 1930s, she was commanded by Horia Macellariu, who would become a rear admiral and the commander of the Romanian Black Sea Fleet in 1943.

== World War II ==
=== Naval engagements ===
With a displacement of almost 400 tons and a main armament of two 130 mm guns, Udarnyy was the most powerful Soviet monitor on the Eastern Front

When Romania joined the Axis invasion of the Soviet Union in June 1941, Mihail Kogălniceanu was the flagship of the Tulcea Tactical Group, a formation of warships defending the coast of the Danube Delta from Soviet naval attacks. On 23 June and 13 July, Mihail Kogălniceanu engaged and repelled the same Soviet monitor, damaging her in both encounters. The Soviet monitor was thus rendered mostly inactive until the Soviet Fleet withdrew from the area in late July. On 14 July, near Ismail, Mihail Kogălniceanu engaged the most powerful Soviet monitor, Udarnyy. The ensuing exchange of fire was fierce, but eventually, Udarnyy was struck and damaged, being forced to retreat. It is possible that Mihail Kogălniceanu also damaged one Soviet armored motor gunboat. On 17 July, she attacked and dispersed a group of Soviet warships at Ismail, possibly sinking one barge. She also shot down one Soviet aircraft, on 29 June.

=== Support of ground operations ===
On 24 June, she attacked the Soviet bridgehead at Ceatalchioi. Only 8 shots were fired, but a munitions or fuel storage was destroyed. On 3 July, she supported Romanian ground troops in their successful elimination of the Soviet bridgehead at Ceatalchioi. On 10 July, she shelled Ismail, and two days later, she shelled a Soviet observation post.

=== Sinking ===
On 24 August 1944, one day after Romania ceased fighting against the Soviet Union, Mihail Kogălniceanu was sunk by Soviet aircraft.

== Post-war ==
After the return of the other surviving Brătianu class monitors from the Soviet Union in 1951, it was decided that Mihail Kogălniceanu and Lascăr Catargiu should be refloated. Catargiu was the first one to be raised in 1951. She was placed back in service as M.3, a year later the designation was changed to M.203.

Kogălniceanu followed in 1956, reentering service with the name M.4, later M.204. She served in the navy until 1957 when she was moved to reserve, and in 1959 she was scrapped along with all other monitors by order of the Ministry of Transport and Telecommunications.
