= NMS Alexandru cel Bun =

Romanian minelayer ship

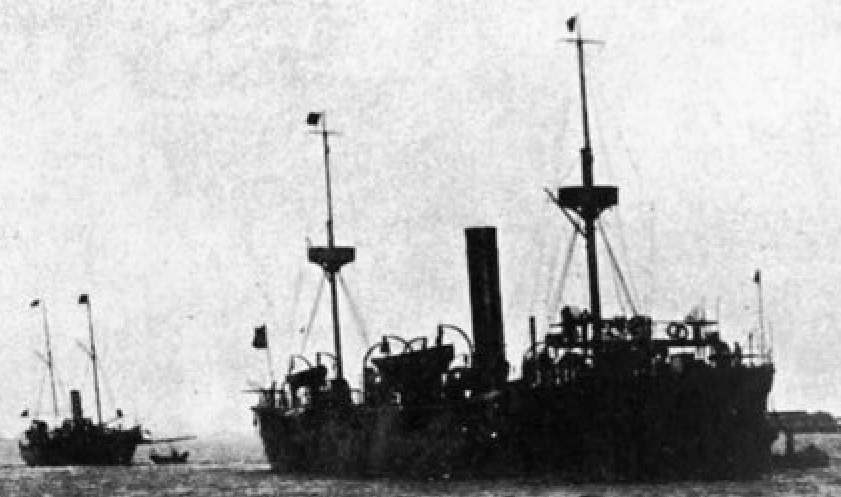
- Alexandru cel Bun (left) following behind the protected cruiser Elisabeta (right)

History

Romania
- Name: Alexandru cel Bun
- Namesake: Alexander the Good
- Ordered: 1882
- Builder: Thames Iron Works, London
- Laid down: 1882
- Launched: 1882
- Completed: 1882
- Commissioned: 1882
- Out of service: 1930s
- Fate: Scrapped

General characteristics
- Type: Minelayer
- Displacement: 104 tons (standard); 116 tons (normal)
- Length: 23 meters
- Beam: 4.57 meters
- Draft: 1.73 meters
- Propulsion: 100 hp steam, 1 shaft
- Speed: 9 knots
- Complement: 20
- Armament: 2 x 37 mm 1-pounder guns; 2 x machine guns; Mines

NMS Alexandru cel Bun was the first minelayer of the Romanian Naval Forces. Built by the United Kingdom in 1882, she served in the Romanian Navy for five decades, until being scrapped in the mid-1930s.

== Construction and specifications ==
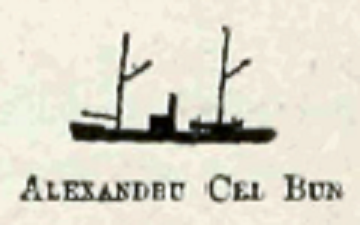
Alexandru cel Bun silhouette

Alexandru cel Bun was built in 1882 by Thames Iron Works. She was part of a larger Romanian order which included three small gunboats and the brig Mircea. It took 84 days to complete Alexandru cel Bun. Serving as the only Romanian minelayer during the First World War, she had a standard displacement of 104 tons. She measured 23 meters (75 feet and 6 inches) in length, with a beam of 4.57 meters (15 feet) and a draught of 1.73 meters (5 feet and 8 inches). She was powered by a 100 hp steam engine which gave her a top speed of 9 knots and carried 12 tons of coal. Crewed by 20 men, she was armed with two 1-pounder guns and two machine guns.

== Service ==
Alexandru cel Bun served mainly as a sea-going warship, but she also laid mines to protect the inland approaches to the Danube Delta. On 22 September 1917, Romania achieved its greatest naval success of the war, when the Austro-Hungarian river monitor SMS Inn struck a Romanian mine and sank near Brăila. She was later salvaged, but was still undergoing repairs when the war ended.

Alexandru cel Bun was scrapped in the mid-1930s, a few years prior to the launching of the much larger, much more powerful, modern and Romanian-built minelayer-escort Amiral Murgescu.
