= First Battle of Cobadin =

World War 1 battle in Dobruja, Romania (1916)

- Part of the Dobruja Campaign of the Romanian Campaign of World War I
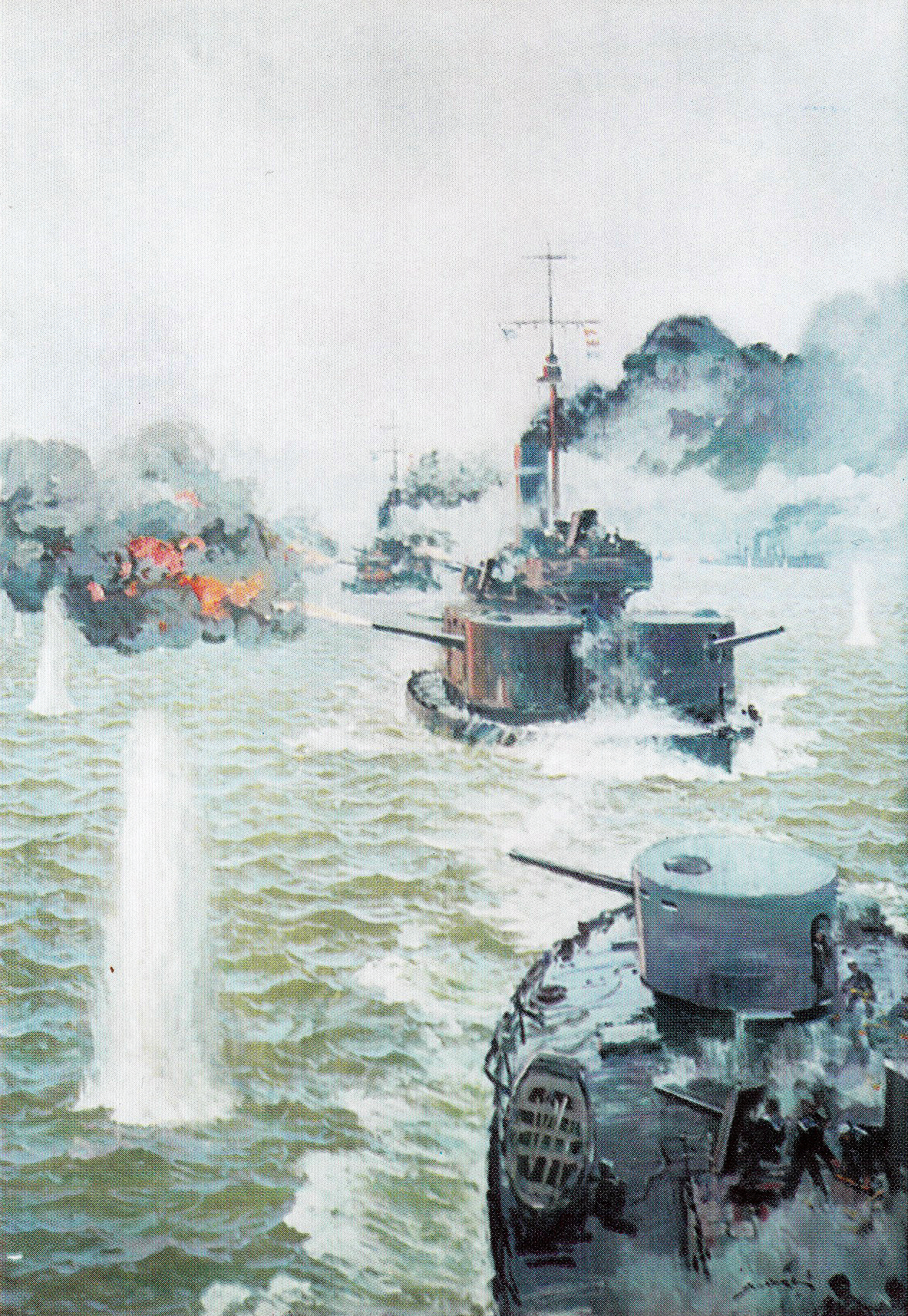
- The Romanian river monitors at Rasova, oil on canvas by Dimitrie Știubei
| Date | 17–19 September 1916 |
| Location | Rasova, Cobadin, Tuzla; Romania |
| Result | Entente victory |

Belligerents
| Bulgaria; German Empire; Ottoman Empire | Romania; Russian Empire |

Commanders and leaders
| (Tsardom of Bulgaria (1908–1946)) Stefan Toshev (German Empire) August von Mackensen (Ottoman Empire) Mustafa Hilmi Pasha | (Kingdom of Romania) Alexandru Averescu; Andrei Zayonchkovski |

Strength
| (Tsardom of Bulgaria (1908–1946)) 55 battalions and 24 squadrons (German Empire) 4 battalions and 3 squadrons (Ottoman Empire) 3 battalions (initially); Total: 62 battalions and 27 squadrons | Total: 70+ battalions and 41 squadrons 4 river monitors |

Casualties and losses
| Bulgaria: 704 killed, 4,778 wounded, 611 missing German Empire Unknown; Ottoman Empire: 36 killed, 348 wounded 62 missing Total: Over 740 killed, 5,126 wounded, 673 missing | Unknown |

The First Battle of Cobadin, also known as the First Battle of the Rasova–Cobadin–Tuzla Line, was fought from 17 to 19 of September 1916 between the Bulgarian Third Army and the Romanian–Russian Army of the Dobruja. The battle ended in Entente tactical victory and forced the Central Powers to hold their offensive and assume a defensive stance till the middle of October.

The right flank of the Allied forces was supported by the Romanian Navy's Danube Flotilla, consisting mainly of four Brătianu-class river monitors. These warships blocked with mines the river sectors of Silistra, Ostrov, and Gura Borcea, protected the 8 September evacuation of Silistra, attacked enemy land convoys, and destroyed enemy batteries.

== See also ==
- Second Battle of Cobadin

== Sources ==
- Министерство на войната, Щаб на войската (1943). Българската армия в Световната война 1915–1918, Vol. IX. Sofia: Държавна печатница.
- Kirițescu, Constantin (1926). Istoria războiului pentru întregirea României: 1916–1919 [История на войната за обединението на Румъния. Войната в Добруджа]. Sofia: Печатница на армейското военно издателство.
- Тошев, Стефан (2007). Действията на III армия в Добруджа през 1916 год. Захарий Стоянов. ISBN 978-954-739-976-1.
- Pollard, Albert Frederick (2006). A Short History of the Great War. BiblioBazaar, LLC. ISBN 978-1-4264-2180-8.
