= NMS Elisabeta =

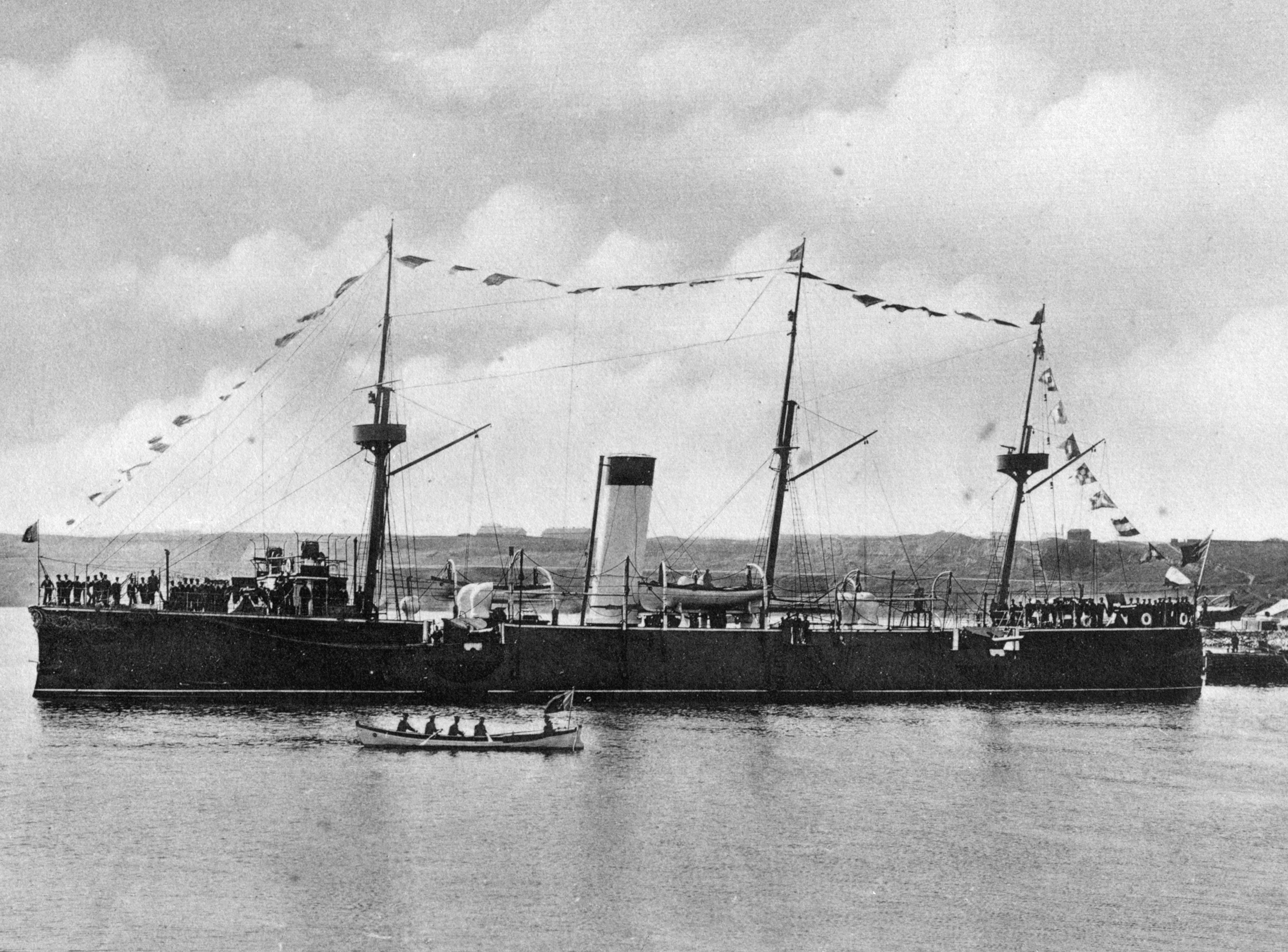
- Elisabeta in 1902

Class overview
- In commission: 1888–1920
- Completed: 1
- Scrapped: 1

History

Romania
- Name: Elisabeta
- Namesake: Queen Elisabeta of Romania
- Ordered: May 1887
- Builder: Armstrong, Elswick
- Yard number: 517
- Laid down: 17 May 1887
- Launched: 29 December 1887
- Completed: September 1888
- Commissioned: October 1888
- Out of service: 1920
- Refit: Galați shipyard, 1904–1905
- Fate: Scrapped, 1930's

Service record
- Commanders: Captain Nicolae Kirițescu (1916)
- Operations: Defence of Sulina
- Victories: 1 torpedo boat driven off; 1 aircraft possibly destroyed

General characteristics (as built)
- Type: Protected cruiser
- Displacement: 1,330 long tons (1,351 t)
- Length: 240 ft 10 in (73.4 m)
- Beam: 33 ft 6 in (10.2 m)
- Draft: 12 ft (3.7 m)
- Installed power: 3,000 ihp (2,237 kW); 4 cylindrical boilers
- Propulsion: 2 shafts; 2 Triple-expansion steam engines
- Speed: 18 knots (33 km/h; 21 mph)
- Complement: 140
- Armament: Initial: 4 × single 15 cm (5.9 in) guns; 4 × single QF 6 pounder Nordenfelt guns; 4 × single 37 mm (1.5 in) guns; 4 × 356 mm (14.0 in) torpedo tubes; 1907: 4 × single 120 mm (4.7 in) guns; 4 × single 75 mm (3.0 in) guns; 4 × 356 mm torpedo tubes; World War I: 4 × single 75 mm (3.0 in) AA guns; 4 x machine guns; 4 × 356 mm torpedo tubes
- Armor: Deck: 1–3.5 in (25–89 mm); Conning tower: 3 in (76 mm); Bulkhead: 4 in (102 mm)

NMS Elisabeta was a small protected cruiser built for the Romanian Navy during the 1880s by Armstrong in Britain as Romania lacked the ability to build the ship itself. Serving mainly as a training ship, she represented Romania at the opening of the Kiel Canal in 1895. She helped protect Romanian interests in Constantinople during the First Balkan War in 1912–1913, but played no significant part in the Second Balkan War and was partially disarmed during World War I. Employed as a barracks ship after the war, the ship was scrapped in 1926.

== Description ==
Elisabeta was built of steel and measured 240 feet (73.2 m) long overall. She had a beam of 33 feet 6 inches (10.2 m) and a draft at the bow of 11 feet 6 inches (3.5 m) that increased to 12 feet 6 inches (3.8 m) at the stern. She displaced 1,330 long tons (1,351 t) at full load. The ship had a crew of 140 officers and crewmen.

Elisabeta had two vertical triple-expansion steam engines, each driving a single 9-foot-8-inch (2.95 m) screw propellers. Four cylindrical boilers provided steam to the engines. The engines had a designed output of 3,000 indicated horsepower (2,237 kW) at normal draft for 16.5 knots (30.6 km/h; 19.0 mph) or 4,500 ihp (3,356 kW) using forced draft for 17.5 knots (32.4 km/h; 20.1 mph). During her sea trials on 14 September 1888, Elisabeta had a top speed of 18.3 knots (33.9 km/h; 21.1 mph) from 4,714 ihp (3,515 kW) using forced draft, but she averaged 18.06 knots (33.45 km/h; 20.78 mph) from 4,271 ihp (3,185 kW) using normal draft, although her main guns had yet to be installed. Her three masts were barque rigged. She carried a maximum of 322 long tons (327 t) of coal.

The ship's main armament consisted of four single 15-centimeter (5.9 in)/35-caliber Krupp breech-loading guns on pivot mounts in semi-circular sponsons on the side of the ship. She carried four single quick-firing 6-pounder guns, two each on the forecastle and poop deck. She also carried four QF 37-millimeter (1.5 in) Hotchkiss guns, at least two of which mounted in the fighting tops. Four 356-millimeter (14.0 in) above-water torpedo tubes were also fitted, one each in the bow and stern and one on each broadside. Her curved protective deck was 1.5 inches (38 mm) thick on the flat and increased to 3.5 inches (89 mm) on the slopes. It tapered to 1 inch (25.4 mm) at the ends of the ship. A 4-inch (102 mm) transverse bulkhead was fitted in the bow and the ship mounted a conning tower protected by 3 inches (76 mm) of armor.

== Construction and career ==
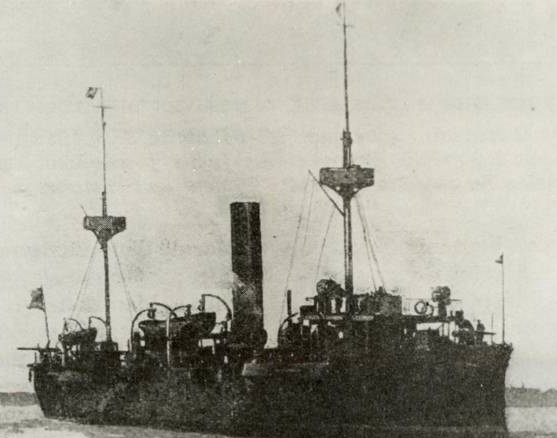
Elisabeta after her 1905 refit

Elisabeta was ordered in May 1887 from Armstrong. According to the Romanian specifications presented in the order, she was to displace 1300 tons, be armed with a main battery of four 6-inch guns and four torpedo tubes, have a top speed of 18 knots and an armored deck with thickness reaching 3.5 inches on the slopes. She was designed by Philip Watts. The ship was laid down at their shipyard in Elswick later that month on 17 May with the yard number of 517. She was launched on 29 December, and conducted her final sea trials on 19 September 1888. Elisabeta sailed for Romania at the end of October 1888, arriving there about three weeks later. After her arrival, her armament was mounted at the Galaţi shipyard because the Romanians preferred Krupp weapons and not Armstrong guns.

The ship made several summer training voyages around the Black Sea in 1889 and 1890. At the beginning of 1891 she began a five-month cruise in the Mediterranean. Elisabeta represented Romania at the 1892 Columbus celebrations of Livorno, Barcelona and Lisbon. In 1894 she made a short cruise in the Black Sea followed by a longer Mediterranean cruise. Elisabeta sailed for Kiel in 1895 to participate in the opening celebration of the Kiel Canal and continued on to Stockholm where she was inspected by the King of Sweden. She made the first Romanian survey of their coast in 1898 and underwent a major refit at Galaţi in 1904–05 where her sailing rig was reduced to two pole masts. The ship was present when the mutinous Russian battleship Potemkin arrived in Constanța in July 1905, but played no significant role in the affair. She did however fire two warning shots (first a blank charge then an explosive charge) at the torpedo boat Ismail when the latter attempted to enter the Romanian port, driving her off.

Elisabeta's armament was exchanged for four French Saint-Chamond 120-millimeter (4.7 in) and four 75-millimeter (3.0 in) guns in 1907, while the 37-millimeter (1.5 in) guns were removed.

Elisabeta was in Istanbul during the First Balkan War, where she landed a total of 130 Romanian marines: 15 at the Romanian Legation, 15 at the Romanian Consulate, and 100 at an outer sector of the city which had been allotted to Romania. While in the city, the Romanian sailors extinguished a large fire and were present at the funeral of Sefket Pasha. Elisabeta along with the 130 deployed sailors left Istanbul on 15 July 1913.

Elisabeta remained at Sulina to defend the mouths of the Danube during the Second Balkan War. When World War I began, her main armament was landed to form a coastal battery on the Danube River for protection against possible attacks by Austro-Hungarian river monitors. With her four 120 mm main guns landed for service ashore, she remained in Sulina under the command of Captain Nicolae Kirițescu for the duration of the war to reinforce the port's anti-aircraft defenses. Her four 75 mm guns were modified for anti-aircraft fire and she also retained her four 356 mm (14 inch) torpedo tubes as well as four machine guns. Romanian anti-aircraft defenses at Sulina shot down one German Friedrichshafen FF.33 seaplane during the spring of 1917. The German pilot managed to land his damaged aircraft on the water, but was subsequently taken prisoner. Elisabeta was taken out of service in 1920 and subsequently used as a barracks ship at Galaţi and later at Sulina. She was sold for scrap in 1926. However, she was not scrapped immediately as she was still in use as a barracks ship as of 1929,

== Bibliography ==
- Bascomb, Neal (2007). Red Mutiny: Eleven Fateful Days on the Battleship Potemkin. Boston: Houghton Mifflin. ISBN 978-0-618-59206-7.
- Brook, Peter (1999). Warships for Export: Armstrong Warships 1867–1927. Gravesend, Kent, UK: World Ship Society. ISBN 0-905617-89-4.
- Gardiner, Robert, ed. (1979). Conway's All the World's Fighting Ships 1860–1905. New York: Mayflower Books. ISBN 0-8317-0302-4.
- Georgescu, Mihai (1984). "Elisabeta". Warship International. Vol. XXI, no. 2. Toledo, OH: International Naval Research Organization. pp. 158–167. ISSN 0043-0374.
- Greger, Rene (1984). "Elisabeta and her Armament". Warship International. Vol. XXI, no. 2. Toledo, OH: International Naval Research Organization. pp. 189–190. ISSN 0043-0374.
