= NMS Trotușul =

Romanian Navy torpedo boat

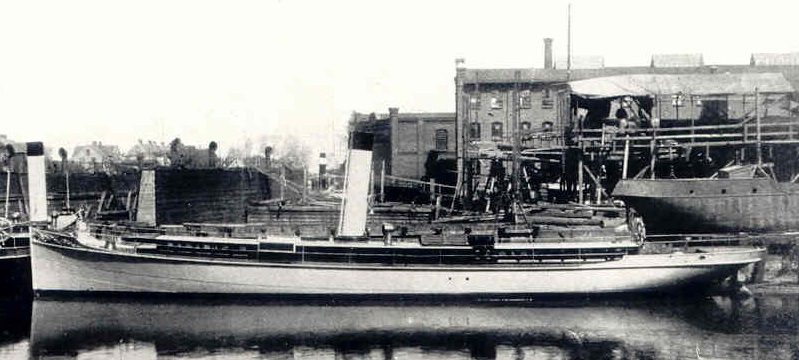
- Vedea-class torpedo boat

History

Romania
- Name: Trotușul
- Builder: Schichau-Werke, Elbing, German Empire
- Laid down: 1894
- Launched: 1894
- Commissioned: 1894
- Fate: Unknown after 1949

Service record
- Commanders: Aschinger Bruno (World War I)
- Victories: Contribution to the capture of 77 vessels

General characteristics
- Class & type: Vedea-class torpedo boat
- Type: Torpedo boat
- Displacement: 30 tons
- Length: 20 m (65 ft 7 in)
- Beam: 3 m (9 ft 10 in)
- Draft: 1.5 m (4 ft 11 in)
- Propulsion: 150 hp
- Speed: 10 knots (19 km/h; 12 mph)
- Range: 8 tons of fuel
- Complement: 16
- Armament: 1 x 37 mm Hotchkiss revolving gun; 1 x 6.5 mm Maxim machine gun; 2 spar torpedoes

NMS Trotușul was a small torpedo boat of the Romanian Navy. Along with her three sister ships, she saw service during World War I and World War II, being the most successful vessel in her class.

== Construction and specifications ==
Trotușul was a vessel of the Vedea-class, a group of small torpedo boats built in Germany for the Romanian Navy in 1894. The class consisted of four boats: Vedea, Argeșul, Trotușul and Teleorman. They were referred to as șalupe torpiloare (torpedo motorboats) by their Romanian owners. Along with her sisters, Trotușul was built at Schichau-Werke, having a displacement of 30 tons, measuring 20 meters in length, with a beam of 3 meters and a draught of 1.5 meters. Each boat had a crew of 16 and a top speed of 10 knots, generated by a 150 horse power engine. Armament consisted of one 37 mm Hotchkiss revolving gun, one machine gun and two spar torpedoes.

The range of these vessels was remarkable. Each could carry up to 8 tons of fuel, which is slightly more than the seaworthy Căpitan Nicolae Lascăr Bogdan class (7.6 tons) and even more than the three boats of the Smeul class (7 tons), which were founding warships of the Romanian Black Sea Fleet.

== Service ==
Trotușul during World War I was commanded by Lieutenant Aschinger Bruno. Along with the Romanian monitor Mihail Kogălniceanu, she carried out the last action of the Romanian Navy during the war, which took place after Romania re-declared war on the Central Powers on 10 November 1918. In the morning of 11 November, three hours before the Allied Armistice with Germany was signed, the monitor and the torpedo boat occupied the port of Brăila, after the Germans retreated from the city. The two Romanian warships captured 77 assorted German vessels abandoned in the city's port (barges, tankers, tugs, floating cranes, motorboats).

The entire class survived to see service during the Second World War and subsequently as late as 1949, being part of the 10 Romanian Navy armed motor launches with displacements ranging from 9 to 30 tons.
