= Flămânda Offensive =

1916 military offensive in Bulgaria

Coordinates: 43°59′15″N 26°14′42″E

- Part of the Romanian Campaign of World War I
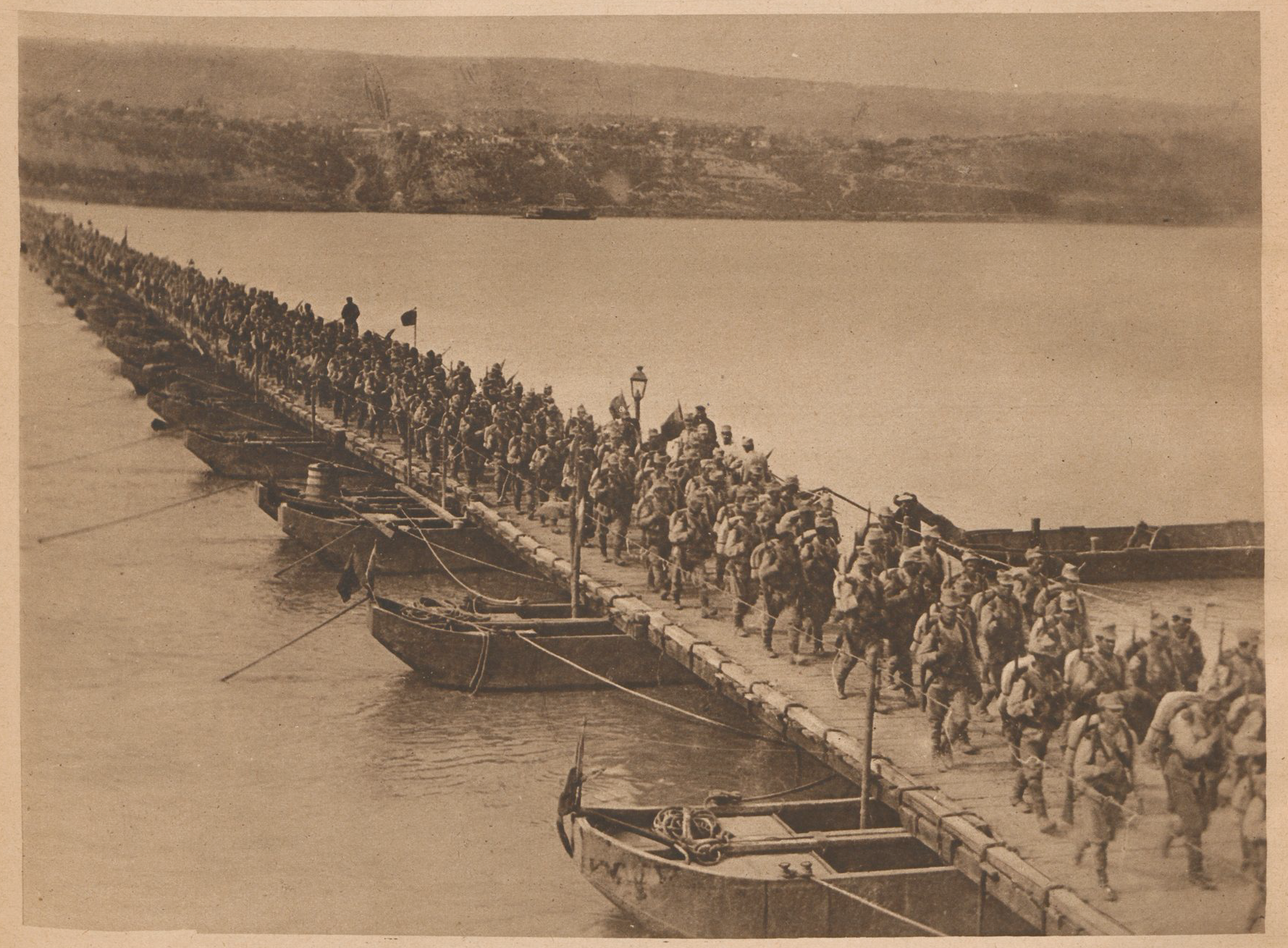
- Romanian infantry crossing the Danube at Flămânda/Ryahovo
| Date | 29 September 1916 – 5 October 1916 |
| Location | Ryahovo and surroundings, Ruse Province, Bulgaria |
| Result | Central Powers victory: Romanian withdrawal |

Belligerents
| German Empire; Bulgaria; Austria-Hungary: Austro-Hungarian navy | Romania |

Commanders and leaders
| (German Empire) Robert Kosch (German Empire) August von Mackensen (Austria-Hungary) Karl Lucich | (Romania) Alexandru Averescu (Kingdom of Romania) Constantin Niculescu-Rizea |

Casualties and losses
| Austria-Hungary; 1 river monitor disabled 2 river monitors damaged 1 patrol boat damaged 1 barge sunk 1 barge damaged 3 killed 5 wounded German Empire; Unknown; Bulgaria; Unknown | Unknown |

The Flămânda Offensive (or Flămânda Maneuver), which took place during World War I between 29 September and 5 October 1916, was an offensive across the Danube mounted by the Romanian 3rd Army supported by Romanian coastal artillery. Named after the hamlet of Flămânda, the battle represented a consistent effort by the Romanian Army to stop the Central Powers' southern offensive led by August von Mackensen. The battle ended as a tactical victory for the Central Powers.

== Background ==
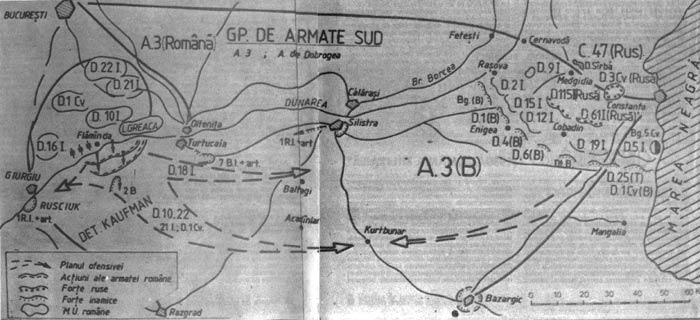
The plan of the offensive

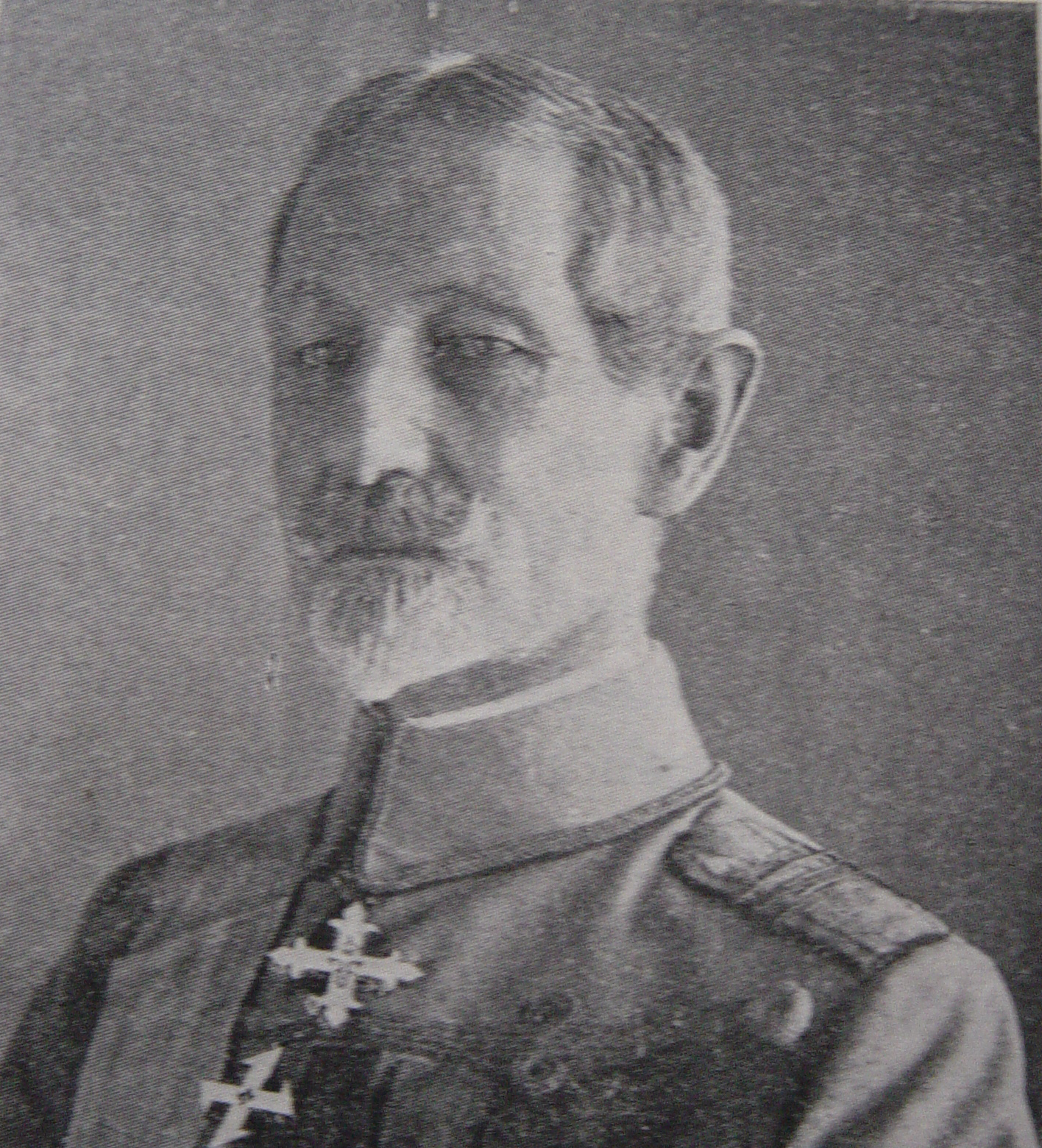
General Alexandru Averescu, commander of the Romanian forces

Romania joined the Allies in World War I in August 1916 when its forces invaded Transylvania across the border in the Carpathian Mountains. The Romanian forces quickly defeated the small number of Austro-Hungarian forces based in the border area and started their advance into Austro-Hungarian territory, but were soon halted. Meanwhile, a Central Powers force comprising Bulgarian, German and Turkish troops and led by August von Mackensen entered Dobruja in southeastern Romania.

Facing more serious threats than expected, the Romanian Crown Council decided to reinforce the 3rd Army, led by General Alexandru Averescu, with 150,000 more men. Averescu subsequently was put in charge of an army group consisting of the 3rd Army and the 50,000-strong Army of the Dobruja, commanded by General Andrei Zayonchkovski and comprising 17 divisions, and planned to counterattack Mackensen's forces across the Danube from behind. The plan was to attack the Central Powers forces from the rear by crossing the Danube at Flămânda while the front-line Romanian and Russian forces were launching an offensive southwards towards Cobadin and Kurtbunar, so cutting of Mackensen's army from its bases in northern Bulgaria. Romanian sailors from Apărările de sub apă, a specialized coastal artillery force, had 28 guns at their disposal on the left bank of the Danube (one battery each of 57 mm, 78 mm, 105 mm, and 150 mm, two batteries of 87 mm, and one section each of 120 mm and 210 mm) and six more guns (a battery of 57 mm and a section of 87 mm) on Cinghineaua Island. The entire coastal artillery force was commanded by Naval Commander Constantin Niculescu-Rizea.

== The battle ==
The attack commenced on 29 September 1916 on an 80 km-wide (50 mi) front from Flămânda, near Oltenița, to Zimnicea in the direction of Mackensen's western flank, with the Romanian forces enjoying superiority in numbers of infantry personnel and artillery equipment. However, the Romanian attempt to cross the Danube was slowed by the Austro-Hungarian Navy's Danube Flotilla.

On 1 October, two Romanian divisions crossed the Danube at Flămânda and created a 14 km × 4 km-deep (8.7 mi × 2.5 mi) bridgehead. This area was enlarged the following day, with eight Bulgarian settlements ending up in Romanian hands. The Romanian crossing of the Danube was counter-attacked by the Danube flotilla of the Austro-Hungarian Navy, commanded by Captain Karl Lucich, on the morning of 2 October. The first Austro-Hungarian warships to enter combat were the patrol boats Barsch and Viza. Barsch was shelled by the Romanian coastal batteries and lost her steering; three of her crew were killed and five wounded. The two patrol boats retreated to be replaced by the river monitors Bodrog and Körös. The two warships were unable to shatter the bridge with their guns. Romanian coastal batteries opened fire on Bodrog, which took five hits and was forced out of the battle. Körös was also shelled by the Romanians, taking twelve hits and running aground after her steam lines were severed. An Austro-Hungarian coal barge was also shelled and damaged by the Romanian coastal artillery based on the Cinghineaua island, as was the river monitor Szamos with one 7 cm gun destroyed. Due to the deteriorating situation in Transylvania, General Averescu decided to cancel the offensive, ordering his troops back to the Romanian side of the river on 3 October after repairing the damaged parts of the bridge. On that same day, a large Austro-Hungarian barge loaded with explosives was sent down the river to destroy the bridge, but she was sunk by the Romanian coastal artillery. The Austro-Hungarian flotilla finally left the scene in the early hours of 4 October, after being informed that the Romanian river monitors were approaching the area.

== Aftermath ==
The Danube remained a barrier to military operations until half of Mackensen's army crossed it in late November 1916.

The damage inflicted by the 12 shots fired by the Romanian shore artillery rendered Körös disabled, being still in repairs at Budapest as of 30 June 1917, when all the other 8 monitors of the Austro-Hungarian Danube Flotilla were stationed in captured Romanian Danube ports: Bodrog, Sava and Maros at Măcin and Bosna, Enns, Leitha, Szamos, and Temes at Brăila. She was still out of action when the armistice with Romania was signed in December 1917 and only became operational once again in April 1918.
