= River monitor =

Military warship designed to patrol rivers

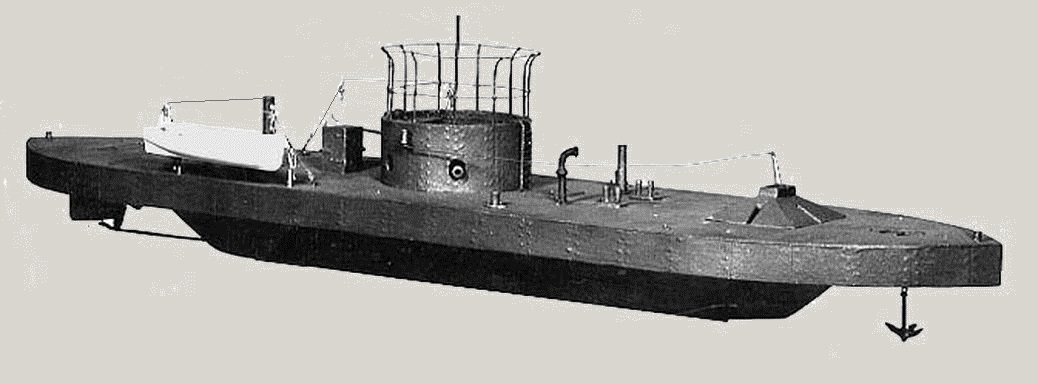
Model of USS Monitor

River monitors are military craft designed to patrol rivers. They are normally the largest of all riverine warships in river flotillas, and mount the heaviest weapons. The name originated from the US Navy's USS Monitor, which made her first appearance in the American Civil War, and being distinguished by the use of revolving gun turrets, which were particularly useful in rivers, whose narrow channels could severely limit the directions vessels could face.

River monitors were used on inland waterways such as rivers, estuaries, deltas and lakes. Usually they had a shallow draft which was necessary for them to be able to operate in enclosed waters; but their displacement, size and draft varied depending on where they were used.

Most river monitors were lightly armored although this varied, with some carrying more armor. Exceptional examples, however, most notably the Royal Navy's Lord Clive-class monitors, which could operate in coastal or certain riparian/estuarine situations, bore extra-thick armor plating and heavy shore-bombardment guns, up to a massive 18 inches (457 mm) in size. Typically, however, river monitors displayed a mixture of gun sizes from 3-inch (75 mm) to 6-inch (152 mm), plus machine guns. This type of vessel overlaps with the river gunboat that would be armed with relatively small caliber cannons, or a mix of cannons and machine guns.

== United States ==
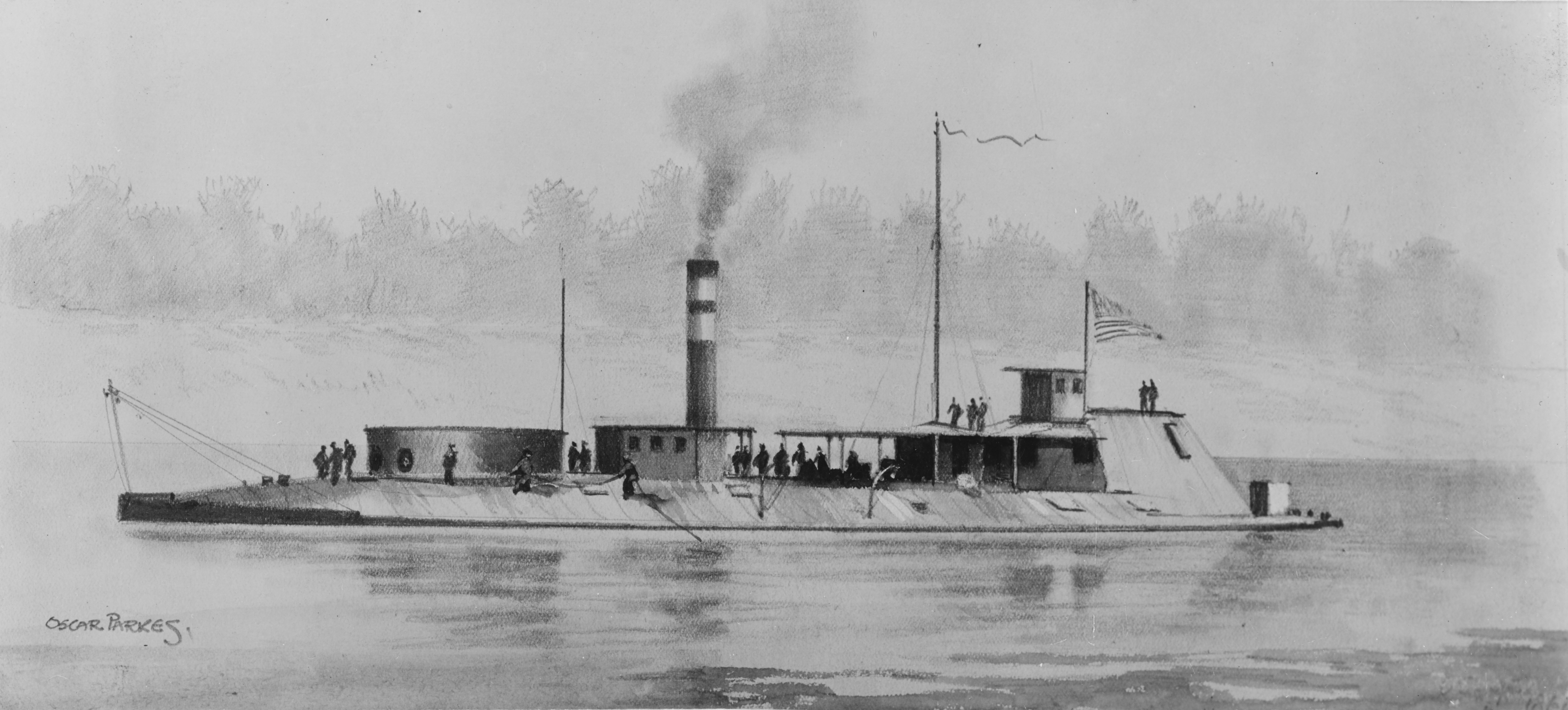
The Civil War era river monitor Neosho

River monitors were used during the American Civil War, playing an important role in the Mississippi River Campaigns. They also played a role in the Battle of Mobile Bay. The American Civil War river monitors were very large, weighing up to 1,300 tons.

On 18 December 1965, the US Navy, for the second time in one hundred years, authorized the reactivation of a brown-water navy for riparian operations in South Vietnam. In July 1966, Secretary of Defense Robert S. McNamara authorized the formation of a Mobile Riverine Force (MRF); a force that would bring back the river monitor.

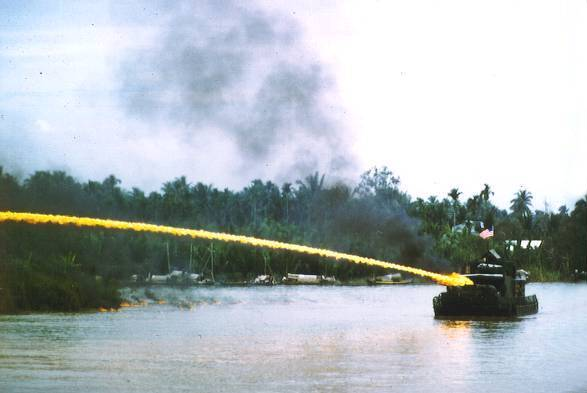
A Mobile Riverine Force monitor using napalm in the Vietnam War

The US Navy operated its Monitors as part of their River Assault Flotilla One, which initially consisted of four River Assault Divisions (RAD); with RAD 91 containing three monitors, RAD 92 having two monitors, RAD 111 having three monitors, and RAD 112 operating two monitors.

The Vietnam monitors were divided into two programs; program 4 would consist of the 40 mm gun monitors, while the later program 5 would entail the eight Monitor (H) Howitzer versions, and the six Monitor (F) Flamethrower models. All of the monitors were converted from World War II 56-foot (17 m) long Landing Craft Mechanized (LCMs) Mk 6s. When completed, they were 60 feet (18 m) long, 17 feet (5.2 m) wide, with a draft of 3 1/2 feet (1.1 m), had two screws driven by two Gray Marine model 64NH9 diesel engines, could do 8.5 knots (15.7 km/h; 9.8 mph) and were manned by usually 11 or more crewmen. They usually carried about ten tons of armor.

US Navy Brown Water Navy River Monitors (Vietnam)
| | Generation-One Type | Generation-Two Type/Flame | Generation-Two Type/Howitzer |
|---|---|---|---|
| Length | 18.6 m (61 ft 0 in) | 18.4 m (60 ft 6 in) | |
| Width | 5.3 m (17 ft 6 in) | | |
| Draft | 1.1 m (3 ft 6 in) | | |
| Engines | 2 Gray Marine 64HN9 diesels; 160 kW (220 hp) at 2100 rpm | | |
| Speed | 8.5 knots (15.7 km/h) | | |
| Crew | 11 | | |
| Armament | 1 81 mm mortar; 1 40 mm auto-cannon; 1 20 mm cannon; 2 Mk 18 grenade launchers; 3 M79 grenade launchers; 2 .50 cal. machine guns; 4 7.62 mm machine guns | 2 20 mm cannons; 2 200m range flamethrowers; 3 M79 grenade launchers; 2 .50 cal. machine guns | 1 105 mm howitzer; 2 20 mm cannons; 3 M79 grenade launchers; 2 .50 cal. machine guns; 1 7.62 mm machine gun |

== Asia ==
On Asian rivers, the Amur Military Flotilla on the Amur used large Taifun-class river monitors of the Imperial Russian Navy from around 1907; the Imperial Japanese Navy captured some of these ships in 1918. They were up to 1,000 tons displacement, armed with 130 mm guns. Some of these Russian monitors, such as the recommissioned Sverdlov, were still in use by the Soviet Navy in the 1945 Soviet invasion of Manchuria. The most powerful and largest riverine vessels were three Khasan-class monitors from 1940s, with 2,400 ton full displacement and limited seagoing capabilities.

During the Vietnam War, the United States Navy, in conjunction with other riverine craft, commissioned 24 monitors, ten of which mounted a single 40 mm cannon in a Mk 52 turret, eight which mounted an M49 105 mm howitzer within a T172 turret, and six monitors which mounted two M10-8 flamethrowers from two M8 turrets located on either side of the vessel's 40 mm cannon. Referred to as "river battleships" by their crews, they provided the firepower of the brown-water navy.

== Europe ==
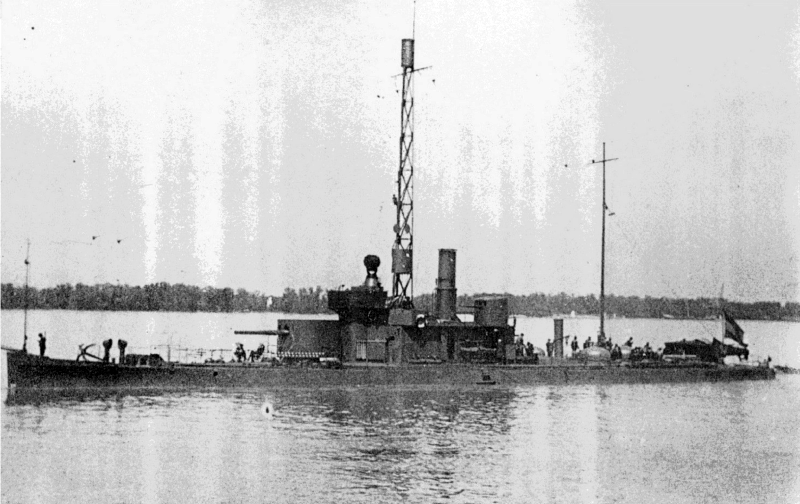
Austro-Hungarian river monitor SMS Inn (later Romanian Basarabia), the largest Danube warship sunk during World War I

On the Danube, river monitors were employed during World War I by Austria-Hungary and Romania. The Austro-Hungarian river monitor Bodrog fired the first shots of World War I, against the city of Belgrade, and later also fought in the Romanian Campaign, notably during the Flămânda Offensive in October 1916, when she was damaged. Another river monitor, Körös, was also heavily damaged by Romanian artillery, taking 12 hits and ran aground after her steam lines were severed. On 22 September 1917, the Enns-class river monitor Inn was sunk by a Romanian mine near Brăila. She was refloated but her repairs were not completed before the War ended, and she was eventually handed over to Romania as war reparation, being renamed Basarabia.

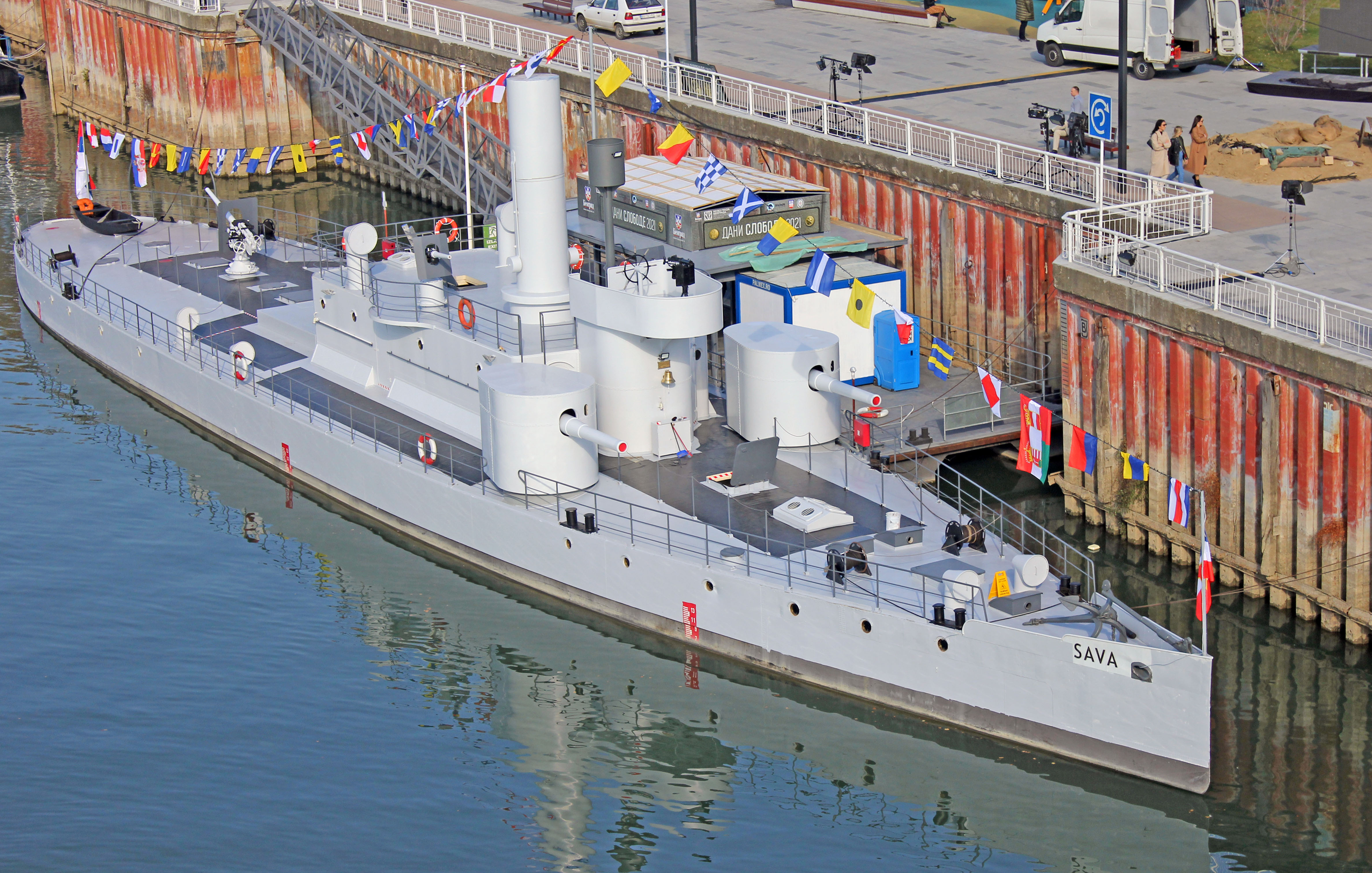
The river monitor Sava (formerly Bodrog) fired the first shots of World War I. She is now a floating museum anchored along the Sava river in Belgrade, Serbia

During World War I, the Romanian Brătianu class were the largest river monitors on the Danube, displacing 680 tons, armed mainly with three 120 mm guns and protected by at least 70 mm of armor around the belt, turrets and conning tower. They were built in sections at Triest in Austria-Hungary, transported to Romania by rail and assembled by the Romanians at the Galați shipyard in 1907–1908. They did not engage enemy ships, however, instead they were used to support ground forces during the Battle of Turtucaia and the First Battle of Cobadin, and also took part in the 1917 campaign, contributing to the stemming of the enemy advance. During the Interwar period, the Romanian Danube Flotilla was the most powerful riverine fleet in the world. In 1924, the Romanian river monitors helped suppress the Tatarbunary Uprising, along with the entire Romanian Danube Flotilla. In late 1980s and 1990s Romania commissioned newly built Smârdan-class river monitors (classified as large armoured boats), and three big Mihail Kogălniceanu-class river monitors, used still in the 21st century.

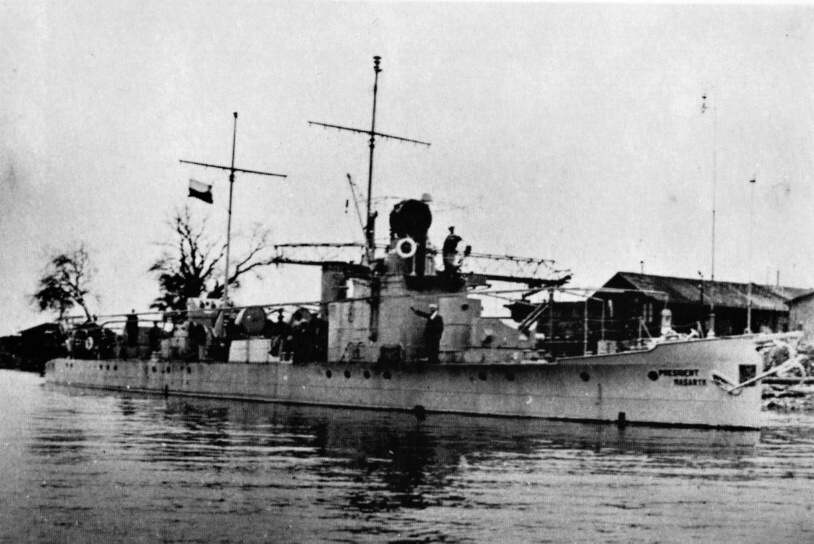
President Masaryk, the flagship of the Czechoslovak River Flotilla

Czechoslovakia had one monitor, President Masaryk, of about 200 tons displacement. She was however classified as a patrol boat (hlídková loď). She was captured by the Germans in 1939 and commissioned as Bechelaren. She was extensively rebuilt in 1943 and her armament was also modified in February 1945. She supported German troops during Operation Spring Awakening and later fought in Austria, sinking two Soviet gunboats.

Yugoslav river monitors were former Austro-Hungarian warships received as reparations. They were renamed Vardar (ex-Bosna), Sava (ex-Bodrog), Drava (ex-Enns) and Morava (ex-Körös). After the fall of Yugoslavia in April 1941, Morava (renamed Bosna) and Sava were commissioned by the newly created Independent State of Croatia.

Six smaller monitors (70–100 ton displacement) were used by Poland in 1939 on shallow Pripyat River. Captured by the Soviet Union, they were used in 1941 by the Soviets on the Pripyat and Dnepr rivers, along with Soviet riverine ships. The Soviet Union also had five Zheleznyakov-class monitors of 263 tons, which served with the Danube Flotilla and Dnieper Flotilla in World War II.

Hungary also used river monitors, five of them notably taking part during the Kozara Offensive in 1942.

== South America ==
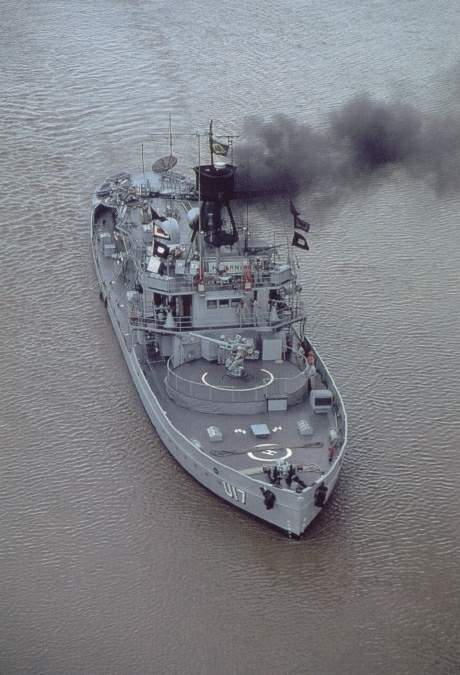
Brazilian Navy's river monitor Parnaíba

The Brazilian river monitor Parnaíba was built for the navy in Rio de Janeiro and commissioned on 9 March 1938. It participated in the Second World War and is currently the world's oldest commissioned warship still in active service. It is assigned to the Brazilian navy's Mato Grosso Flotilla.

== See also ==
- Gunboat
- List of monitors of the United States Navy
- List of monitors of the Royal Navy
- List of monitors of the Swedish Navy
- List of monitors of the Netherlands
