= Brătianu-class river monitor =

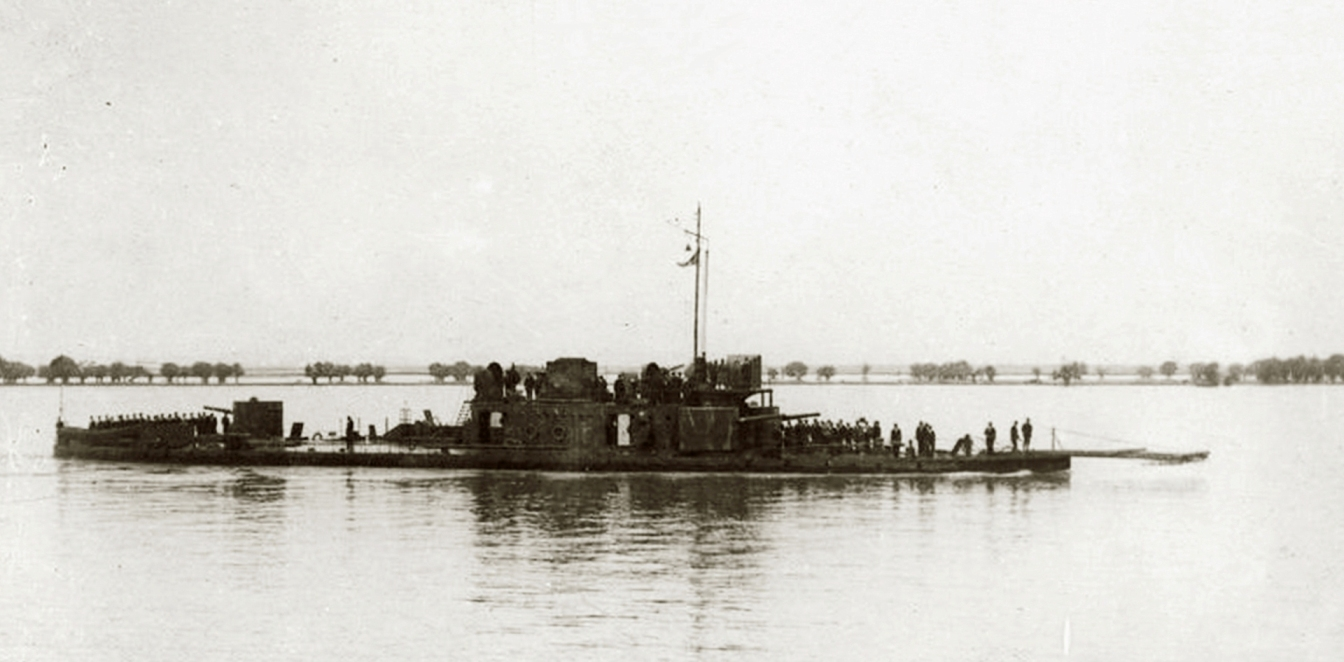
- A Romanian monitor of the Bratianu class during World War I

Class overview
- Name: Brătianu class
- Builders: Stabilimento Tecnico Triestino (4); Galați shipyard (assembly)
- Operators: Romanian Naval Forces; Soviet Navy
- Built: 1907–1908
- Completed: 4
- Lost: 2
- Retired: 2

General characteristics
- Displacement: 680 tonnes (670 long tons)
- Length: 63.5 m (208 ft)
- Beam: 10.3 m (34 ft)
- Draught: 1.6 m (5.2 ft)
- Propulsion: 2 sets of TE reciprocating engines 1,300 kW (1,800 hp)
- Speed: 13 knots (24 km/h; 15 mph)
- Complement: 110
- Armament: 3 x 120 mm (4.7 in)/L35 Škoda naval guns; 2 x 120 mm (4.7 in)/L10 howitzers; 4 x 47 mm (1.9 in)/L44 QF guns; 2 x 6.5 mm (0.26 in) machine guns
- Armour: Belt: 70 mm (2.8 in); Turrets: 75 mm (3.0 in); Deck: 20–75 mm (0.79–2.95 in); Conning tower: 70–75 mm (2.8–3.0 in); bulkheads: 60 mm (2.4 in)

The Brătianu-class river monitors were a class of four river monitors used by the Romanian Navy. They were named Ion C. Brătianu, Lascăr Catargiu, Mihail Kogălniceanu and Alexandru Lahovari.

== Design and construction ==
The class was based on similar Austro-Hungarian river monitors, such as the Körös and Temes classes. The Romanian warships were larger and had a main armament of three 120 mm naval guns in individual turrets, two 120 mm howitzers, four QF guns of 47 mm and two 6.5 mm machine guns. Armor thickness reached 70–75 mm around the belt, turrets and conning tower, 60 mm at the bulkheads and down to only 20 mm over some portions of the deck. The four warships were built by STT in Austria-Hungary in sections, transported to Romania by rail then assembled and launched at the Galați shipyard in Romania between 1907 and 1908.

== Operational service ==
=== World War I ===
During the Romanian Campaign of the First World War, the monitors supported Romanian ground forces during the Battle of Turtucaia and evacuated the Romanian 9th Infantry Division from the besieged city. Later, they contributed to the halting of the Central Powers' advance into the Danube Delta and held the line against the German forces in Moldavia during the summer and fall of 1917.

They also contributed to the Romanian-Russian victory at the First Battle of Cobadin and news about their arrival ended the Battle of Flămânda.

=== World War II ===
On 22 and 23 June 1941, at the start of Operation Barbarossa, Mihail Kogălniceanu, aided by another Romanian monitor, Basarabia, and four patrol boats, managed to repel two Soviet attacks, sinking one patrol boat and damaging another two as well as two Soviet monitor. On 24 August 1944, Lascăr Catargiu and Mihail Kogălniceanu were sunk by Soviet aircraft. On 27 August Ion C. Brătianu was captured by the Soviets and renamed Азов (Azov) while Alexandru Lahovari was also captured on 2 September and renamed Мариуполь (Mariupol). The two ships were eventually returned to Romania on 23 June 1951, and the sunk monitors were also refloated. They were put into reserve in 1957 and subsequently scrapped between 1959 and 1962.

== Gallery ==
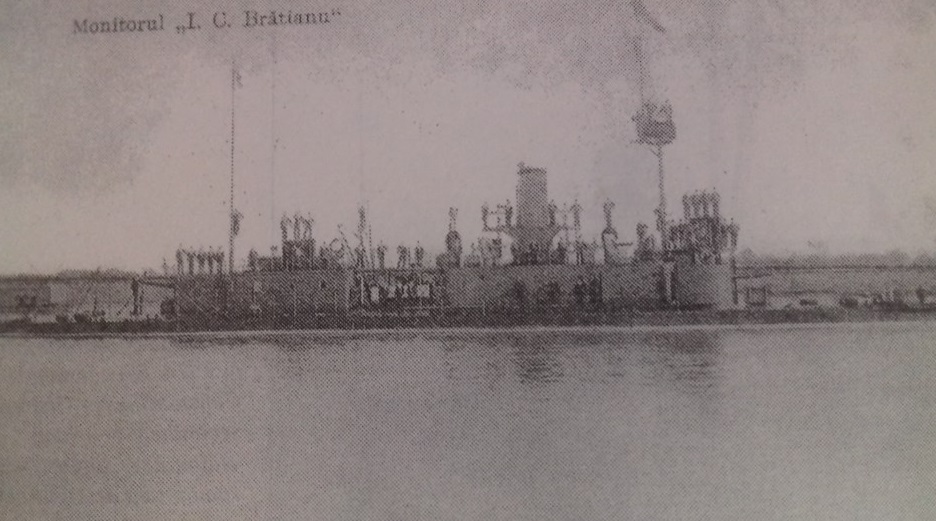
The monitor Brătianu in 1913.

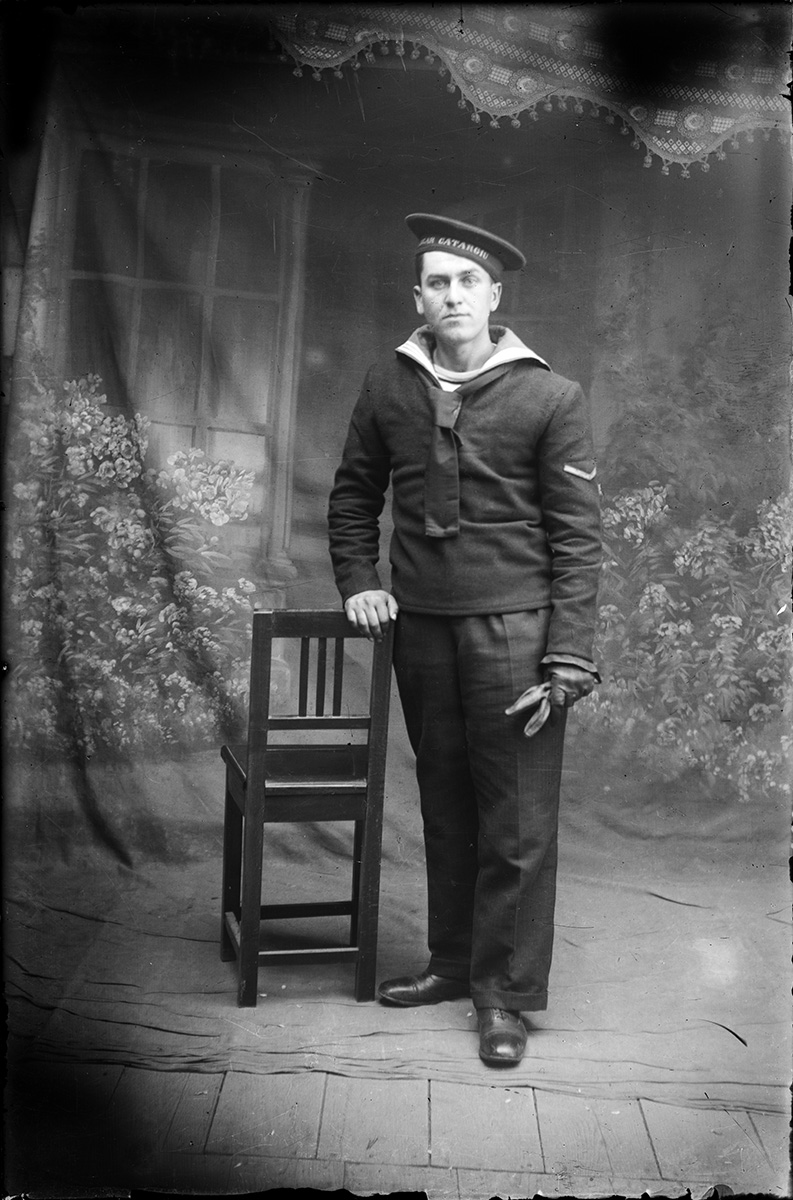
Sergeant serving with Lascăr Catargiu

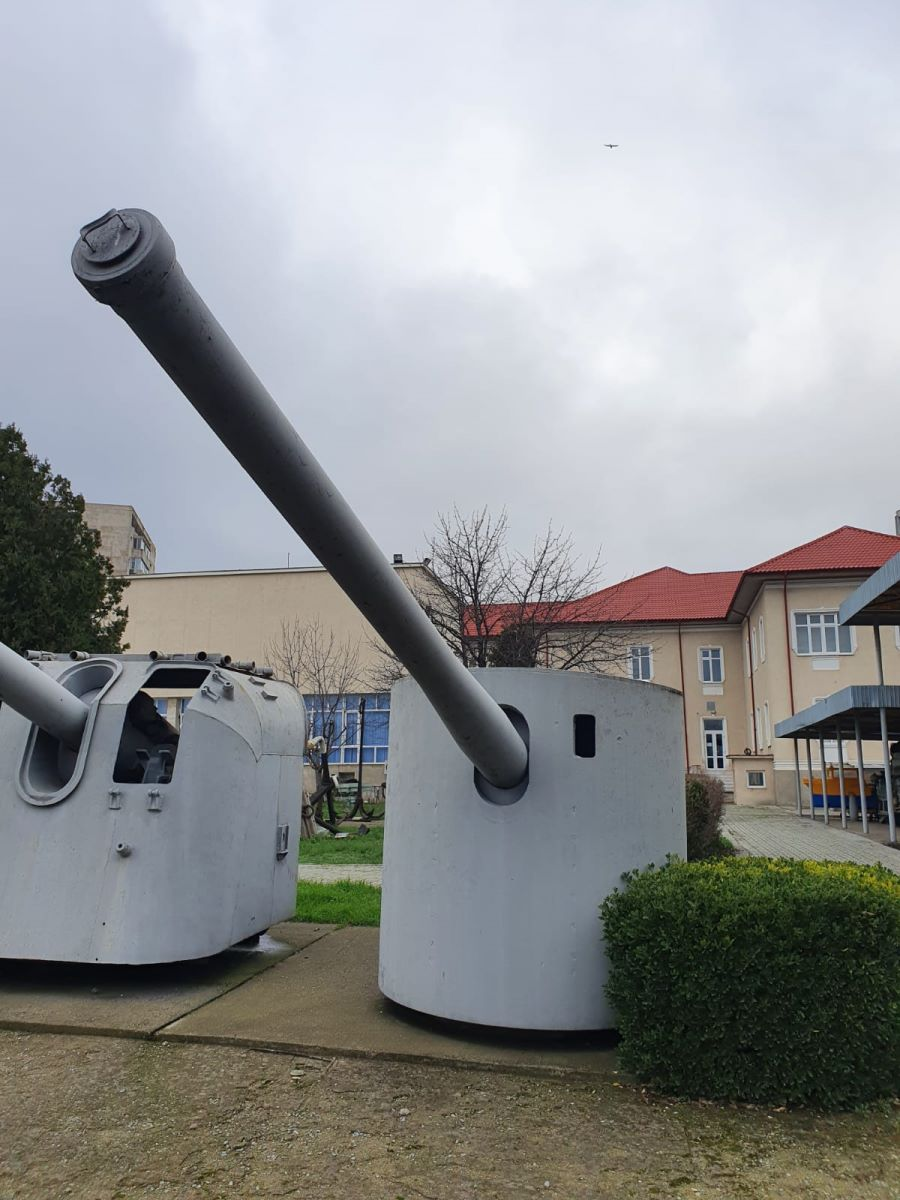
A surviving 120 mm gun turret.

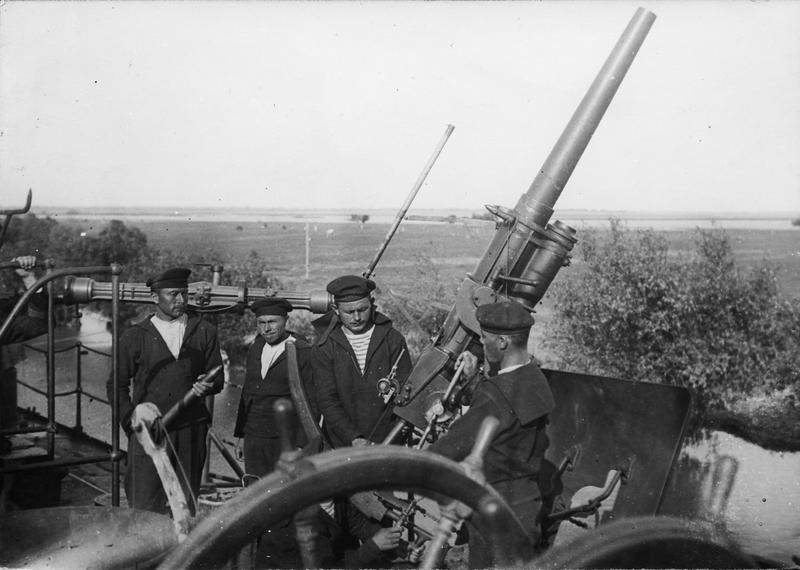
A 47 mm anti-aircraft gun.

Weapons layout of Azov after Soviet capture and re-arming
