= List of equipment of the Romanian Armed Forces =

This is a list of equipment of the Romanian Armed Forces currently in service and storage

== Infantry equipment ==
=== Individual equipment ===
==== Clothing ====
Model	Image	Origin	Type	Details
Camouflage
M2017		Romania	Camouflage pattern	Introduced in 2017 to replace the DPM camouflage. Similar to MultiCam.
MultiCam		United States	Camouflage pattern	Made by UF PRO. In use with the special forces, mountain troops, paratroopers and ISR units.

==== Protection ====
Model	Image	Origin	Type	Details
Helmets
Stimpex ST-4		Romania	Combat helmet	PASGT type helmet.
Stimpex STI-HC22		Romania	Combat helmet	High Cut, NVG compatible. Provides level IIIA ballistic protection.
OR-201		Israel	Combat helmet	Not seen in active service recently.
Ops-Core FAST		United States	Combat helmet	Used by special forces.
Schuberth M100		Germany	Combat helmet	Used by special forces, delivered by Rotman Industries SRL in Romania.
MICH		United States	Combat helmet	Used by the DCSL special forces detachment.
Ballistic protection equipment
Stimpex VST-1		Romania	Bulletproof vest	With MOLLE system. Provides level II, IIA, IIIA, or NIJ 0101.06 protection levels.
Stimpex VST-PC22		Romania	Bulletproof vest	Features MOLLE panels and quick release systems. Provides front, back and side level III, IIIA and IV protection levels.
EOD-9		United States	Bomb suit	Advanced Bomb Suit manufactured by Med-Eng. Used by EOD troops.

==== Night vision equipment ====
Model	Image	Origin	Type	Details
AN/PVS-14		United States	Monocular Night Vision Device	
IOR MVN-1X		Romania	Monocular Night Vision Device	925 monocular night vision goggles, part of a contract launched by MApN.
IOR OVN-C		Romania	Binocular Night Vision Device	3,024 binocular night vision goggles and another 131 goggles fitted with the 3X device, part of a contract launched by MApN.

=== Infantry weapons ===
==== Small arms ====
Model	Image	Origin	Type	Caliber	Details
Knives
6H3		Soviet Union; Romania	Bayonet	—	Used with the PM md. 63/65 and PSL rifles.
6H4		Soviet Union; Romania	Bayonet	—	Used with the PA md. 86 rifle.
Pistols
SIG Sauer P320		United States; Romania	Semi-automatic pistol	9×19 mm Parabellum	Will be the standard Romanian pistol as part of the SAI program funded through SAFE. Will be produced locally at Cugir.
Pistol model 2000		Romania	Semi-automatic pistol	9×19 mm Parabellum	Standard service pistol. Modernized version of Pistol md. 1995. In 2021, a new version of the pistol, called "Pandurul" was presented. A first phase of 1,000 model 2021 pistols entered Romanian army service.
Pistol Md. 1995		Romania	Semi-automatic pistol	9×19 mm Parabellum	Not to be confused with Carpați model 1995.
Glock 17		Austria	Semi-automatic pistol	9×19 mm Parabellum	Used by troops on deployment and several special operations forces.
Glock 19		Austria	Semi-automatic pistol	9×19 mm Parabellum	Used by special forces.
Heckler & Koch USP		Germany	Semi-automatic pistol	9×19 mm Parabellum	Used by Detașamentul Special de Protecție și Intervenție (DSPI) special operations detachment.
SIG Sauer P226		Switzerland	Semi-automatic pistol	9×19 mm Parabellum	Used by special forces.
CZ P-10 C		Czech Republic	Semi-automatic pistol	9×19 mm Parabellum; 40 S&W	CZ P-10 C NATO Suppressor Ready pistols used by units of the Romanian Land Forces.
Submachine guns
HK MP5		Germany	Submachine gun	9×19 mm Parabellum	Used by special forces.
HK UMP9		Germany	Submachine gun	9×19 mm Parabellum	Used by special forces.
Uzi		Israel	Submachine gun	9×19 mm Parabellum	Mini Uzi used by military police.
Assault rifles and carbines
SIG516 G3		United States; Romania	Assault rifle	5.56×45 mm NATO	Will be the standard Romanian assault rifle as part of the SAI program funded through SAFE. Will be produced locally at Cugir.
PA md. 86		Romania	Assault rifle	5.45×39 mm	Standard service rifle, will be replaced by 100,000 new rifles.
PM md. 63/65/90		Romania	Assault rifle	7.62×39 mm	Romanian Navy and Army reserve.
HK416		Germany	Assault rifle	5.56×45 mm NATO	Standardized assault rifle used by special forces.
HK G36		Germany	Assault rifle	5.56×45 mm NATO	Used by special forces.
M4 carbine		United States	Assault rifle	5.56×45 mm NATO	Used by special forces.
M5 carbine		Czech Republic	Assault rifle	5.56×45 mm NATO	Colt CZ Group carbine used by various units.
Steyr AUG		Austria	Bullpup assault rifle	5.56×45 mm NATO	Used by special forces.
SIG 551 LB		Switzerland	Assault rifle	5.56×45 mm NATO	Used by special forces.
SIG 553		Switzerland	Carbine	5.56×45 mm NATO	Used by Detașamentul de Căutare-Salvare prin Luptă (DCSL) special forces detachment of the Romanian Air Force.
Machine guns
PM md. 64		Romania	Light machine gun	7.62×39 mm	Romanian version of RPK, standard LMG, will be replaced by new LMGs.
PM md. 93		Romania	Light machine gun	5.45×39 mm	Romanian version of RPK-74.
M249 light machine gun		United States	Light machine gun	5.56×45 mm NATO	US version of FN Minimi. Used by special forces.
Mitraliera md. 66		Romania	General-purpose machine gun	7.62×54 mmR	Romanian version of PKM, standard GPMG.
Vektor SS-77		South Africa	General-purpose machine gun	7.62×51 mm NATO	215 SS-77 MK1 purchased in 2008
M240 medium machine gun		United States	General-purpose machine gun	7.62×51 mm NATO	Used by special forces. Also mounted use on HMMWV. In the Stage I (Phase 2) of the MBT, MoND wants to complete the Abrams-equipped battalion's capabilities with 54 M240 machine guns.
Dillon Aero M134D		United States	Rotary machine gun	7.62×51 mm NATO	Mounted on IAR 330 helicopters.
DShK		Romania	Heavy machine gun	12.7×108 mm and 12.7×99 mm NATO	Mainly mounted use (tanks, URO VAMTAC and Humvee), but also on tripod.
Browning M2HB-QCB		United States	Heavy machine gun	12.7×99 mm NATO	Mounted use.
Precision rifles
PSL		Romania	Designated marksman rifle	7.62×54 mmR	Based on the AK-47 mechanism and similar in design to the Russian SVD, will be replaced by new snipers in the contract for 240,000 arms.
M110		United States	Sniper rifle	7.62×51 mm NATO	Used by special forces.
ArmaLite AR-10 SuperSASS		United States	Sniper rifle	7.62×51 mm NATO	215 purchased in 2008 with BAE Systems AN/PAS-13C TWS.
Brügger & Thomet APR		Switzerland	Sniper rifle	7.62×51 mm NATO	Used by special forces.
Heckler & Koch PSG1		Germany	Sniper rifle	7.62×51 mm NATO	Used by DSPI special operations detachment.
SIG Sauer SSG 3000		Germany	Sniper rifle	7.62×51 mm NATO	Used by special forces.
Barrett M82		United States	Anti-materiel rifle	12.7×99 mm NATO	Used by special forces.
Ceremonial rifles
SKS M56		Romania	Semi-automatic rifle	7.62×39 mm	License-produced version of the SKS by Cugir. Used by the 30th Guards Brigade.
Shotguns
Mossberg M500		United States	Pump action shotgun	12 gauge	Used by special forces.

==== Explosive weapons ====
Model	Image	Origin	Type	Caliber	Details
Grenades
F-1		Romania	Hand grenade, defensive grenade	—	
M-92	—	Romania	Hand grenade, offensive grenade	—	
RG-42		Romania	Hand grenade, offensive grenade	—	
RKG-3		Romania	Hand-grenade, anti-tank grenade	—	RKG-3E (EM) version.
GMM multirole hand grenade	—	Romania	Multifunctional hand-grenade	—	Defensive, offensive and HEAT variants.
Grenade launchers
AG-40		Romania	Under-barrel grenade launcher	40×47 mm (Romania)	P version in 40×47mm and PN version in 40×46mm NATO.
AGA-40 Model 85		Romania	Automatic grenade launcher	40×74.5 mm (Romania)	In service with the 81st Mechanized Brigade.
CZ GL		Czech Republic	Grenade launcher	40×46 mm NATO	Supplied by Colt CZ Group.
M203		United States	Under-barrel grenade launcher	40×46 mm LV	
Mk 19		United States	Automatic grenade launcher	40×53 mm HV	The Mk 19s are included in the acquisition of Assault Amphibious Vehicles, contracted in 2023 and in 2026.
Shoulder-fired/mounted weapons
AG-9		Romania	Recoilless rifle	73 mm	Romanian version of SPG-9. Capable of firing thermobaric ammunition.
AG-7		Romania	Rocket-propelled grenade	40 mm	Romanian version of RPG-7; standard anti-tank weapon at infantry squad level.
M72A5 LAW		Norway	Light rocket-propelled grenade	66 mm	Bought from Nammo Raufoss AS, Norway. Used by special forces. 24 initially purchased
9K111 Fagot		Soviet Union	Anti-tank guided missile	120 mm	9M111-2 variant. Acquired in the 1980s.
FGM-148 Javelin		United States	Man-portable anti-tank system	127 mm	Included in the $80 million sale approved by the US State Department are 263 Javelin FGM-148F missiles and 26 Javelin Light Weight Command Launch Units. The systems are intended to be used by the Special Forces. Additional 33 Javelin systems to be bought in 2024.
Spike-LR		Israel	Anti-tank guided missile	130 mm	Used on MLI-84M Jderul, URO VAMTAC and in portable format for ground troops. 2,000+ missiles
Spike-LR2		Israel	Anti-tank guided missile	130 mm	Additional 500 Spike LR2 missiles were purchased from Eurospike GmbH. Framework agreement of 426 million lei over 4 years signed in 2024.

== Land Forces ==
=== Combat vehicles ===
Model	Image	Origin	Type	Variant	Numbers	Details
Main battle tanks
T-55		Soviet Union	Main Battle Tank	T-55AM T-55AM2	~162	Active in 3 battalions. Will be phased out starting in 2026.
TR-85		Romania	Main battle tank	TR-85-800 TR-85M1 Bizonul	103-226 54	The upgraded TR-85M1 version (1999-) is heavily modified to meet NATO standards. In 2023, it was announced that the TR-85M1 would be further upgraded. 1 battalion of TR-85M1.
M1 Abrams		United States	Main Battle Tank	M1A2 SEPv3	0/54	Romania is to purchase one battalion of 54 tanks and 12 tank-chassis derivatives in the first stage of the "Main Battle Tank" program. A possible sale for the Abrams tanks and related equipment for an estimated cost of $2.53 billion was approved on 9 November 2023. According to data provided by the Ministry of National Defence (MApN) during a press briefing, deliveries of the 54 Abrams tanks will start in 2026. 1 battalion of M1A2R(SEPv3).
Infantry fighting vehicles
MLI-84		Romania	Infantry fighting vehicle	MLI-84 MLI-84M Jderul	23-41 101	Based on the Soviet BMP-1 with a number of modifications. MLI-84M Jderul is the modernized version, equipped with a 25 mm Oerlikon KBA cannon and Spike missiles.
Lynx		Germany; Romania	Infantry fighting vehicle	IFV 120 mm mortar Command post MEDEVAC	0/233 0/19 0/22 0/24	Through the SAFE fund, Romania will acquire 298 Lynx vehicles and derivatives. The contract was signed on 29 May 2026 for 3.37 billion euros. The Lynx will replace the MLI-84. Local production will be carried out at Rheinmetall Automecanica. Additional configurations will include command vehicles, MEDEVAC, a mortar carrier with Patria NEMO 120 mm mortars and anti-aircraft vehicles with Skyranger systems.
Armoured personnel carriers
Piranha V		Switzerland; Romania	Infantry fighting vehicle/Armoured personnel carrier	120 mm mortar Command post CBRN Ambulance Recovery vehicle	227	The Piranha V is built in Romania based on a joint-venture agreement between Uzina Mecanică București (UMB) and GDELS Romania under a contract signed in 2018.: 227 (Phase I); Status: Delivered (by 2026): 359 (Phase II); Status: Planned
TABC-79		Romania	Armoured personnel carrier	TAB-C TAB-79A-PCOMA TAB-79AR TAB RCH-84	402	TABC-79: will be replaced by Otokar Cobra II. TAB-71: around 600 in storage being phased out by Otokar Cobra II. An undisclosed number was delivered to Ukraine between 2022 and 2023. TAB-77: Romanian-produced version of the BTR-70 with a number of modifications, being phased out by Piranha 5. TAB B33: will be replaced by Piranha 5.
TAB-71		Romania	Armoured personnel carrier	TAB-71M TAB-71A TAB-71AR	211	TABC-79: will be replaced by Otokar Cobra II. TAB-71: around 600 in storage being phased out by Otokar Cobra II. An undisclosed number was delivered to Ukraine between 2022 and 2023. TAB-77: Romanian-produced version of the BTR-70 with a number of modifications, being phased out by Piranha 5. TAB B33: will be replaced by Piranha 5.
TAB-77		Romania	Armoured personnel carrier	TAB-77M TAB-77A TAB-77A-PCOMA	155	TABC-79: will be replaced by Otokar Cobra II. TAB-71: around 600 in storage being phased out by Otokar Cobra II. An undisclosed number was delivered to Ukraine between 2022 and 2023. TAB-77: Romanian-produced version of the BTR-70 with a number of modifications, being phased out by Piranha 5. TAB B33: will be replaced by Piranha 5.
TAB B33 Zimbru		Romania	Armoured personnel carrier		69	TABC-79: will be replaced by Otokar Cobra II. TAB-71: around 600 in storage being phased out by Otokar Cobra II. An undisclosed number was delivered to Ukraine between 2022 and 2023. TAB-77: Romanian-produced version of the BTR-70 with a number of modifications, being phased out by Piranha 5. TAB B33: will be replaced by Piranha 5.
MLVM		Romania	Infantry fighting vehicle/Armoured personnel carrier	MLVM MLVM-M MLVM AR ABAL MEDEVAC	76	MLVM: Infantry fighting vehicle for mountainous terrain. Classified as an armoured personnel carrier. Used by the Vânători de munte units.
MEDEVAC MLI-84M		Romania	Armoured medical evacuation vehicle	MEDEVAC	Unknown	Based on MLI-84M chassis. Can transport 2 wounded on standard stretchers and 2-3 wounded in semi-sitting position on the removable bench.
Piranha IIIC		Switzerland	Armoured personnel carrier	Personnel transport Command post CBRN Mortar carrier MEDEVAC Recovery vehicle	43	Up-armoured with armour kits from Plasan Sasa (Israel). A total of 31 APCs and 12 specialised variants.
Multi-purpose armoured vehicles
Otokar Cobra II		Turkey; Romania	Infantry mobility vehicle/MRAP	Personnel transport Reconnaissance RCWS Spike LR 120 mm mortar 81 mm mortar CBRN Engineering MEDEVAC	378/1059	As part of the Light armored tactical type vehicles (ATBTU) program, a total of 1,059 vehicles in 9 configurations are to be provided for the Romanian Armed Forces. From the 279th vehicle, manufacturing is to take place in Romania. In October 2024 the Otokar Cobra II won the tender for around $934 million.
Humvee		United States	Multi-purpose armoured vehicle	M1113 M1114 M1165 M1151	300+	Up-armoured M1113, M1165 were used by International Security Assistance Force troops in Afghanistan. M1114 is used by Military Police. M1151 is used by Romanian Land Force.
Oshkosh JLTV		United States	Multi-purpose armoured vehicle/MRAP	M1278A1 Heavy Gun Carrier	70/129	A deal worth $104 million for 129 Heavy Gun Carriers JLTVs, as well as radio kits, equipment, turret materials, and program support was approved in March 2023. A total of 176 vehicles will be bought, according to former chief of Romanian Special Forces. These will replace the old HMMWVs used by the Special Forces.
URO VAMTAC		Spain	Multi-purpose armoured vehicle	S3 S3-HD ST5 ST5 BN2	42 20 4+ 0/24	Used by Special Forces and troops; S3-HD variant with light up-armour; ST5 used by EOD units.
Panhard PVP		France	Light armoured vehicle		16	
LAPV Enok		Germany	Light armoured vehicle	Enok AB	Unknown	Airborne variant to be used by the special forces.
Wolf Armoured Vehicle	Batalionul 265 politie militara 10	Israel	Multi-purpose armoured vehicle		3	Used by the Military Police.
Stimpex Dracon		Romania	Multi-purpose armoured vehicle		1	Seen in use with the "Samoilă Mârza" Psychological Operations Center.
Mine Resistant Ambush Protected Vehicles
Cougar		United States	Mine Resistant Ambush Protected vehicle	JERRV	4	Used by the EOD troops. More MRAPs, including M-ATVs to be bought through US Excess Defense Articles.

=== Engineering vehicles ===
Model	Image	Origin	Type	Variant	Numbers	Details
Engineering vehicles
DMT-85M1		Romania	Combat engineering vehicle		5	Armoured engineer vehicle based on the TR-85M1 chassis with a new, fixed superstructure, a 6.5t crane and a Pearson TWMP mine clearing plough. The commander has a cupola with RWS. Five were built between 2007 and 2009.
M1150 Assault Breacher Vehicle		United States	Combat engineering vehicle		0/4	Will be delivered with the M1A2 SEPv3.
TERA-71L		Romania	Armoured recovery vehicle		8	Based on TAB-71 APC.
TERA-77L		Romania	Armoured recovery vehicle		44	Based on TAB-77 APC.
TER-85		Romania	Armoured recovery vehicle		8	Based on TR-85 chassis. Not seen in active service recently.
MLI-84M TEHEVAC		Romania	Armoured recovery vehicle		3	Based on MLI-84M chassis. Crane load is 2200 kg.
BPZ-2		Germany	Armoured recovery vehicle		3	Delivered as offset for Gepard SPAAG by KMW.
M88 Recovery Vehicle		United States	Armored recovery vehicle	M88A2 HERCULES	0/4	Along with the 54 M1A2R tanks, Romania will also receive 4 M88A2 recovery vehicles.
AMT 125		Romania	Crane truck		20+	Used by military engineering units.
AMT 950		Romania	Crane truck		5	Used by military engineering units.
Grove		Germany; United States	Crane truck	GMK3060 GMK5150	Unknown	In service with Comandamentul Logistic Întrunit.
Autogreder		Romania	Road grader	AG-180	30+	Used by military engineering units.
Bulldozer		Romania	Bulldozer	S.1500L.S.	10	Used by military engineering units.
SŁ-34		Poland	Wheeled loader		6	Used by military engineering units.
Matenin NX7		France	Trench digger	NX7 B3	10-15	Used by military engineering units.
MFRD		France	Counter-mobility vehicle		Unknown	Used by military engineering units.
PMA		East Germany	Armoured vehicle-launched bridge	BLG-67M	43	Used by military engineering units.
M1110 Joint Assault Bridge		United States	Armoured vehicle-launched bridge		0/4	Will be delivered with the M1A2 SEPv3.
Volkswagen Transporter		Germany	Van	SIBCRA	35+	Sampling and identification of biological, chemical and radiological agents vehicle.
Mercedes-Benz Sprinter		Germany	Van		Unknown	Used for transport and radio stations.
Explosive ordnance disposal robots
PIAP Gryf		Poland	Military robot		Unknown	Purchased by the Romanian Air Force for the Air Force EOD Group of the 70th Aviation Engineer Regiment.
CALIBER T5		Canada	Tracked military robot		Unknown	
Foster-Miller TALON		United States	Tracked military robot		Unknown	

=== Multi-purpose vehicles ===
Model	Image	Origin	Type	Variant	Numbers	Details
Unarmoured multi-purpose vehicles
Dacia Duster		Romania	Four-wheel drive multi-purpose vehicle		886+	One has been modified for use as CBRNE vehicle.
Ford Ranger		United States	Four-wheel drive multi-purpose vehicle	4x4	Unknown	Used by Military Police.
Chevrolet LSSV Tahoe		United States	Four-wheel drive command vehicle		17	Equipped with Harris radio equipment.
Jeep Wrangler		United States	Four-wheel drive command vehicle		Unknown	Equipped with Harris 400W HF, VHF and microwave radios.
Technamm		France; Japan	Light utility vehicle	Jankel Fox by Masstech	5+	Modified Toyota Land Cruiser for use by special forces.
Polaris ATV		United States	Light all-terrain vehicle	Ranger Sportsman MV850	143+	Used by special forces and troops.
Polaris DAGOR		United States	Light all-terrain vehicle	DAGOR A1	60	To be used by special forces and troops.
Polaris MRZR		United States	Light all-terrain vehicle	MRZR Diesel	Unknown	Used by special forces and troops.
Arctic Cat Prowler		United States	Light all-terrain vehicle	XT 1000	Unknown	Used by the Vânători de munte units.
TGB ATV		Taiwan	Light all-terrain vehicle	Blade 1000 LT EPS	Unknown	Used by the Vânători de munte units.
Argo 8×8		Canada	Amphibious all-terrain vehicle	Aurora 950	Unknown	Seen in use with Comandamentul Logistic Întrunit.
BMW R1250GS		Germany	Motorcycle		17	Used by the Military Police.
Citroën Jumper		France	Van		Unknown	Used for MEDEVAC.
Daimler Truck & Bus Romania		Germany	Bus		0/137	Daimler Truck & Bus Romania was selected to provide buses with 51 passenger seats as part of a contract for the Romanian Army.
Trucks
Iveco		Italy; Romania	Truck	M170 M250 M320 SM88 M1250 Trakker	2279/3139	In 4×4, 6×6 and 8×8 configurations. 57 trucks purchased in 2015, and another 173 in 2017. First phase contract for 2909 trucks signed in 2019. From the 301st truck, production continues at the Iveco factory in Petrești.: 942 (1st batch); Status: Delivered (by 2024): 1107 (2nd batch); Status: Delivered (by 2026): 860 (3rd batch); Status: Under production (will be funded through SAFE)
DAC		Romania	Truck	665T/G 6×6 443T 4×4 887R 8×8 11.154 4×4 15.240 6×6 16.230 4×4	500+	The DAC 665T chassis is also used for APR-40 multiple rocket launcher, while the slightly improved APRA-40 is based on DAC 15.215 DFAEG.
ROMAN		Romania	Truck	16.310 FAEG 22.310 DFAEG 26.360 DFAEG 26.410 DFAEG 21.290 DFAEG 22.290 DFAEG	183+	Chassis for weapons systems like LAROM, ATROM, as Rocket Containers Transport and Load Vehicle, to carry command posts and weather stations and various others transport duties. 23 trucks were delivered in 2018.
FMTV		United States	Truck	M1084A1P2 M1089A1P2	54 10	Support vehicles for the HIMARS MRL.
Ford Cargo		Turkey; United States	Truck		6	UAV ground control stations for the Bayraktar drones.
Oshkosh M1070		United States	Truck	M1300	Unknown	The Government of Romania has requested to buy M1300 tractors with M1302 trailers for its future M1A2 Abrams tanks.
HEMTT		United States	Truck	M978A4 M1120	Unknown	The Government of Romania has also requested to buy HEMTT M978A4, M1120 HEMTT Load Handling System and M1076A1 with flat rack, all fitted with B-Kit/Frag Kit.
MAN		Germany	Tank truck	TGS 18.400	Unknown	In service with Comandamentul Logistic Întrunit.

=== Army watercraft ===
Model	Image	Origin	Type	Numbers	Details
PR-71		Romania	Pontoon bridge	Unknown	Used by military engineering units.
ST 140		Romania	Utility armoured motorboat	Unknown	3.5 tons, 8–10 mm armour, 140 hp engine. Used by military engineering units for maneuvering pontoons, it can also transport up to 20 soldiers.
MLC 240		Romania	Self-propelled barge	4	Used by military engineering units.
MLC 300		Romania	Ferryboat	4	Used by military engineering units.
BP-10		Romania	Assault boat	8	Paddled for silent approach or fitted with an outboard motor. Capacity: 10 soldiers
Zodiac MK3		France	Assault boat	34	Equipped with Evinrude Etec 50 hp engine.

=== Artillery ===
Model	Image	Origin	Type	Numbers	Details
Mortars
M 1988		Romania	60 mm mortar	Unknown	There are also two 2001 versions: a commando version and an extended range version.
M 1977		Romania	82 mm mortar	1,342	Also available in 81 mm caliber. 9 were delivered to Rep. of Moldova in 2025.
M 1982		Romania	120 mm mortar	315	
Howitzers
M82		Romania	76 mm mountain howitzer	82	Used by vânători de munte units. Based on the Yugoslav M48.
M30M		Romania	122 mm howitzer	202	A variant of the Soviet 122 mm howitzer M1938 upgraded by Romania.
M1981		Romania	152 mm howitzer	320	Licensed built after the Soviet 152 mm howitzer D-20. An undisclosed number was delivered to Ukraine between 2022 and 2023.
M1985		Romania	152 mm howitzer	116	A variant of the M81 howitzer, with performance similar to the 2A65 "Msta-B".
Self-propelled artillery
K9 Tunet		Republic of Korea	Self-propelled artillery	5/54	On 19 June 2024, it was announced that the K9, Romanian version "Tunet", was selected as the winner in the contract bid launched in 2023. Ammunition will also be supplied as part of the contract. Production will start in Korea with the first 18 vehicles fully manufactured there. The other 36 K9s will be assembled in Romania. Each of the three battalion-sized systems is to consist of: 18 tracked self-propelled howitzers (K9) with 9 spare barrels; 12 ammunition resupply vehicle (K10); 9 self-propelled artillery observation posts (K11); 3 technical evacuation vehicles (K12); 3 acoustic reconnaissance systems; 1 weather station.
Rocket launchers
APR-40		Romania	Multiple rocket launcher	135	Romanian improved version of BM-21 Grad; further developed into APRA-40. An undisclosed number was delivered to Ukraine between 2022 and 2023.
LAROM		Romania; Israel	Multiple rocket launcher	54	Based on the APRA-40 Model 1988 122C.
M142 HIMARS		United States	Multiple rocket launcher/Tactical ballistic missile system	54	54 launchers ordered. First battalion set arrived in 2021, second battalion set arrived in 2023. Last battalion set arrived in 2024.
Missiles and rockets
ATACMS M57 (Block 1A)		United States	Tactical ballistic missile	54	All were delivered by 2025.
GMLRS M30A1/M31A1		United States	Surface-to-surface missile	534	All were delivered by 2024.
LAR-160 Mk IV		Israel	Surface-to-surface missile	Unknown	Used with the LAROM systems.
M-21OF (9M22U)		Romania	Unguided rocket	Unknown	Used with the LAROM and APR-40 systems.
Ammunition resupply vehicles
K10		Republic of Korea	Ammunition resupply vehicle	1/36	As part of the contract for the K9, each battalion will contain 12 ammunition resupply vehicles.

=== Anti-tank ===
Model	Image	Origin	Type	Numbers	Details
Towed guns
M1977		Romania	100 mm towed anti-tank gun	206	12 were delivered to Rep. of Moldova in 2025. Will be replaced by WB Electronics Warmate loitering munition.
Anti-tank launcher vehicles
9P122 "Malyutka"		Soviet Union	Anti-tank guided missile launcher vehicle	90	12 9P122 Sagger B and 78 9P133 Sagger C. Not seen in active service recently.
9P148 "Konkurs"		Soviet Union	Anti-tank guided missile launcher vehicle	48	Also capable of firing the 9K111 Fagot missile. Not seen in active service recently.

=== Mines ===
Model	Image	Origin	Type	Numbers	Details
DPM-4		Romania	Minelayer	Unknown	Towed by DAC 6×6 trucks. Used by military engineering units.
MAI-2		Romania	Tripwire fragmentation mine	110	For training purposes only.
MAI-6		Romania	Pressure activated blast mine	90	For training purposes only.
MAI-68		Romania	Pressure activated blast mine	120+120	120 with disc and 120 without disc. For training purposes only.
MAI-75		Romania	Pressure activated blast mine	1940	For training purposes only.
MSS		Romania	Bounding fragmentation mine	120	For training purposes only.
MAT-62B		Romania	Anti-tank blast mine	Unknown	
MAT-76		Romania	Anti-tank blast mine	Unknown	

=== Radars ===
Model	Image	Origin	Type	Numbers	Details
Skyguard		Switzerland	Fire-control radar	36	Acquired in 1998 for use with the Oerlikon GDF-003.
AN/TPQ-53		United States	Counter-battery radar	6	Romania purchased six AN/TPQ-53 Quick Reaction Capability Radar systems from the US for $129 million. All systems were delivered in 2025.
PPE PGSR-3i "Beagle"		Hungary	Ground surveillance radar	4	Mounted on URO VAMTAC armoured tactical vehicles.
X-TAR3D		Italy	AESA Fire control radar	4	Fully coherent phased array pulse Doppler radar for the Oerlikon GDF-003 anti-aircraft guns. Built by Rheinmetall Italia. Stationary on a standard container that can be loaded onto trucks. Oerlikon Skymaster TLCN fire control system.

=== Anti-aircraft ===
Model	Image	Origin	Type	Numbers	Details
Anti-aircraft artillery
ZU-2		Romania	2×14.5mm anti-aircraft machine gun	Unknown	Romanian manufactured version. There is also a 4×14.5mm version called the MR-4, essentially a ZPU-4, but with a two-wheel carriage designed locally.
M 1980/88		Romania	2 × 30 mm anti-aircraft gun	300	
Gepard		Germany	Self-propelled anti-aircraft gun	36	Plus 7 vehicles for spare parts.
Skyranger 35 - Lynx		Italy	Self-propelled anti-aircraft gun Mobile Command Unit	0/24 0/6	Romania will purchase Skyranger systems through SAFE. These will be mounted on the Lynx armored vehicles.
Oerlikon GDF-003 Oerlikon GDF-009		Switzerland	2 × 35 mm anti-aircraft gun	72 Unknown/24	Contract with Rheinmetall to modernise the Oerlikon GDF-003 anti-aircraft guns. Worth around €328 million for 4 batteries of 6 guns to the GDF-009 standard. 1 battery includes: 1 Oerlikon Skymaster TLCN fire control system; 1 X-Band Tactical Acquisition Radar 3D, or X-TAR3D; 6 35mm GDF009 TREO Oerlikon Twin Guns; 2 heavy-duty special trucks for transporting the fire control system and the tracking radar; AHEAD ammunition; 2 batteries to be delivered by December 2025, 2 additional planned by December 2026
Surface-to-air missiles
CA-94		Romania	Man-portable air-defense	Unknown	Including CA-94M modernized version, and 6 regular Strela-2s. Not seen in active service recently.
Chiron		Republic of Korea	Man-portable air-defense	83 (launchers)	The Ministry of National Defense initially acquired 54 Chiron systems with 162 missiles for over 96 million dollars from LIG Nex1 through a Government to Government contract. First systems were delivered in June 2024. The second batch of 51 launchers was delivered in November.
Mistral 3		France	Man-portable air-defense	0/231 (launchers)	In 2024, Romania entered the joint procurement of Mistral 3 systems as part of the European EDIRPA program in November 2024. Romania will buy 231 launchers with 934 missiles for €625 million. Funding will be covered by the SAFE program.
Surface-to-air missiles systems
CA-95M		Romania	4×4 amphibious short-range surface-to-air missile system	48	Licensed built 9K31 Strela-1 (NATO designation SA-9 "Gaskin") using a TABC-79 vehicle instead of BRDM-2. An undisclosed number was delivered to Ukraine between 2022 and 2023.
9K33 Osa		Soviet Union	6×6 amphibious surface-to-air missile system	16	4 batteries of 9K33M3 "OSA-AKM" type (16 9A33B TELAR and 8 9T217 transloader vehicles). Not seen in active service recently.
2K12 Kub		Soviet Union	Tracked medium-range surface-to-air missile system	32	8 batteries. Not seen in active service recently.
MIM-104 Patriot		United States	Mobile long-range surface-to-air missile/Anti-ballistic missile	0/3 batteries	Romania is the 14th Patriot customer worldwide. Of the total 7 systems, 3 will be for the Land Forces.
SPYDER		Israel	SHORAD VSHORAD	0/6 (systems) 0/6 (systems)	System using I-Derby, Python 5, and Piorun missiles. Contract signed in June 2026 for €2.04 billion. The Phase I contract for the land forces includes 6 SHORAD and 6 VSHORAD systems. In total, 9 SHORAD systems and 16 VSHORAD systems planned for the land forces.
Counter-UAV systems
Skybeam		Lithuania; Israel	Anti-drone rifle	Unknown	Provided by Israeli company Skylock.
SILENTA 6001		Romania	Anti-drone rifle	30 systems	Provided by Romanian company BlueSpace.
NOCTUA 3101		Romania	Passive radar	10 systems	Provided by Romanian company BlueSpace.
Elbit ReDrone		Israel	Counter-UAS	0/8 systems	Multi-layered anti-drone system integrating SIGINT, EW and EO capabilities. Provided by Israeli company Elbit under a $60 million contract.
Merops		United States	Counter-UAS	Unknown	Anti-drone system which utilizes artificial intelligence to identify and neutralize drones.

=== Army aircraft ===
Model	Image	Origin	Type	Variant	Numbers	Details
Unmanned Aerial Vehicles
Bayraktar TB2		Turkey	UCAV	TB2 SİHA	18	A contract for 18 TB2 UCAVs, including the logistics support package, personnel training and training equipment was signed on 25 April 2023 for $321 million. The Bayraktar drones were delivered to the former 93rd Air Base and entered service with the Romanian Land Forces.
ScanEagle		United States	UAV		10	Was used in Afghanistan
Small Unmanned Aerial Vehicles
AeroVironment RQ-11 Raven		United States	SUAV		Unknown	In service with infantry units.
CFly Faith		China	Quadrotor UAV	Faith 2	Unknown	Seen in use with Comandamentul Logistic Întrunit.
DJI		China	Quadrotor FPV drone Quadrotor UAV	DJI Avata 2	8+	Used by various units for surveillance activities.
DJI		China	Quadrotor FPV drone Quadrotor UAV	DJI Neo	8+	Used by various units for surveillance activities.
DJI		China	Quadrotor FPV drone Quadrotor UAV	DJI Phantom	8+	Used by various units for surveillance activities.
DJI		China	Quadrotor FPV drone Quadrotor UAV	DJI Matrice 300 RTK	8+	Used by various units for surveillance activities.
Phoenix 30		United States	Quadrotor UAV		4	The drones weigh 14 lb (6.4 kg) and can reach a top speed of 24 kn (44 km/h; 28 mph). The sale also included the UAVS Dragon View sensor.
Potensic		China	Quadrotor UAV	Atom 2	Unknown	Seen in use with Multinational Brigade South-East.
Quantum-Systems		Germany	Class 1 Mini-UAS	Vector	56 (systems)	Selected as the winner of the fixed-wing Mini UAS system contract on 14 May 2024. Another 34 systems have been contracted through SAFE. The contract also includes 15 Scorpion kits, which allow the drone to be converted from a fixed-wing configuration, for long and efficient flight, into a Multicopter configuration, for vertical takeoff or landing and hovering.
Loitering munitions
AeroVironment Switchblade		United States	Loitering munition	Switchblade 300 Switchblade 600	25 systems Unknown	25 Loitering Munition Strike Systems SwitchBlade 300, valued at 176 million lei, along with an undisclosed number of SwitchBlade 600 systems. AeroVironment was awarded the contract as part of the 2024 Foreign Military Sales on 26 September 2024. Estimated completion of the order is expected in 2026.
WB Electronics		Poland	Loitering munition		70 systems	Will be funded through SAFE.

== Air Force ==
=== Aircraft ===
Model	Image	Origin	Type	Variant	Numbers	Details
Fighter aircraft
F-16		United States	Multirole fighter aircraft	F-16 AM/BM block 15 MLU	64/67	17 initially bought from Portugal. As part of the F-16 program, another 32 F-16 were bought from Norway. All Norwegian F-16s are set to arrive in 2026. 18 Dutch F-16s from the European F-16 Training Center were transferred to the Romanian Air Force in November 2025. Six additional F-16 used for ground training.
F-35		United States	Multirole combat aircraft	F-35A	0/32	Romania is the 20th F-35 customer worldwide. As part of the procurement program, a total of 48 F-35s will be acquired in two phases. The contract for the first phase of 32 aircraft worth $6.5 billion was signed on 21 November 2024. Another 16 aircraft will be purchased in a second phase. The first aircraft will arrive after 2030.
Transport/Surveillance aircraft
C-27J		Italy	Cargo/Transport aircraft	C-27J	7	
C-130		United States	Cargo/Transport aircraft	C-130B C-130H	3 4	More C-130H to be bought through US Excess Defense Articles.1 C-130B and 1 C-130H are stored. Last C-130H was delivered by United States in October 2026.
Boeing C-17 Globemaster III		United States	Strategic transport	C-17	3 (shared within NATO's SAC programme)	The Heavy Airlift Wing (HAW) is part of the SAC group which includes 12 nations — Bulgaria, Estonia, Hungary, Lithuania, the Netherlands, Norway, Poland, Romania, Slovenia, United States, Finland and Sweden.
An-30		Soviet Union	Surveillance aircraft	An-30	2	Aerial cartography for Treaty on Open Skies.
An-26		Soviet Union	Cargo/Transport aircraft	An-26	1	
Trainer aircraft
IAR 99		Romania	Advanced trainer /Light attack aircraft	IAR 99C Șoim IAR 99 SM	11 2/10	Used for training, reconnaissance and close in air support missions. IAR-99C Șoim is an upgraded variant with modern avionics similar to the MiG-21 LanceR. 10 IAR 99 airplanes were modernized to the SM (Standard Modernizat) variant by Avioane Craiova and Elbit, but deliveries to the Romanian Air Force have been delayed. First two IAR 99 SM were delivered in November 2026.
Aerostar Iak-52		Romania	Trainer aircraft	Iak-52W Iak-52TW	14	Licensed-built Yak-52 by Aerostar.
Helicopters
IAR 330		Romania	Utility helicopter Helicopter gunship	IAR 330L/M IAR 330 SOCAT	35 22	In total there are 57 IAR 330 helicopters. The IAR-330M and SOCAT are modernised variants.
IAR 316		Romania	Training helicopter	IAR 316	7	Out of a total of 125, a single squadron remains operational as a training unit at Boboc.
H175M		France	Utility helicopter	H175M	0/6	A total of 6 H175M helicopters will be purchased through SAFE.
H225M		France	Armed helicopter	H225M	0/12	A total of 12 H225M helicopters will be purchased through SAFE. Another 30 helicopters will be bought after 2031. The helicopters will be outfitted in an "attack configuration".
Unmanned Aerial Vehicles
RQ-4 Global Hawk		United States	Surveillance UAV	Block 40	5 (shared within NATO's AGS programme)	Last drone delivered on 12 November 2020. Initial operational capability was achieved in February 2021.
Watchkeeper X		Israel; Romania	Unmanned Aerial Vehicle	Watchkeeper XR	0/21	The Israeli company Elbit Systems proposed the production of Watchkeeper X drones in Romania. Romania is to acquire 7 systems, with a total of 21 drones. The first purchase order of 3 systems with a total of 9 drones was awarded to Elbit Systems in June 2023. Delays are since the Israel-Gaza war.

=== Air defence ===
Model	Image	Origin	Type	Variant	Numbers	Details
Air defence artillery
S-60		Soviet Union	57 mm anti-aircraft gun	CRT 1RL-35M1	Unknown	Still in use as of 2026. Will be replaced with Skynex systems.
Skynex		Italy	C-RAM and C-UAS		0/7 Systems	Romania will purchase Skynex systems through SAFE.
Surface-to-air missiles systems
MIM-23		United States	Surface-to-air missile	Hawk XXI	8 batteries	About 150 missiles in stock. Upgraded to the Hawk XXI variant in 2018. The systems are also integrated with four EL/M-2106 ATAR radars acquired in 2017.
MIM-104 Patriot		United States	Surface-to-air missile/Anti-ballistic missile	456 PAC-2 GEM-T missiles; 168 PAC-3 MSE missiles	3/4 batteries	Romania is the 14th Patriot customer worldwide. First system arrived in 2020. Of the total 7 systems, 4 are used by the Air Force. An additional 200 PAC-2 GEM-T missiles for the Patriot systems will be received through a joint contract. One Patriot battery was donated to Ukraine. The donated battery will be replaced, with Romania only having to pay $60 million in taxes and commissions.
IRIS-T SL		Germany	Surface-to-air missile	IRIS-T SL	0/3 systems	Romania will buy IRIS-T SL systems (most probably medium range) from Germany through the SAFE program.
SPYDER		Israel	SHORAD/VSHORAD		0/6 (systems)	System using I-Derby, Python 5, and Piorun missiles. Contract signed in June 2026 for €2.04 billion. The Phase I contract for the air force includes 6 integrated SHORAD/VSHORAD systems. In total, 16 integrated SHORAD/VSHORAD systems planned for the air force.

=== Airspace surveillance ===
Model	Image	Origin	Type	Variant	Numbers	Details
Radars
P-14		Soviet Union	Radar	O/P-14	Unknown	2D VHF radar
P-18		Soviet Union	Radar	P-18	Unknown	2-dimensional air search radar; in service since 1977; mounted on Ural-375D chassis.
P-37		Soviet Union	Radar	P-37 Bar Lock	Unknown	2D E band/F band radar; in service since 1975.
PRV-13		Soviet Union	Radar	PRV-13	Unknown	In service since 1978.
TPS-79		United States; Romania	3D radar	TPS-79(R)	19	3-dimensional air search radar; in service since late 2004. The Gap Filler radars are to be modernized under a 1.8 billion lei program.
AN/FPS-117		United States	3D radar	AN/FPS-117E (T) TPS-77	5 7	3-dimensional air search radar; in service since 1998.
AN/MPQ-65		United States	PESA radar	AN/MPQ-65	3	Used with the Patriot systems. Components for the radar are also produced locally by Romaero. The four Air Force radars were named Black Sea Betty, Black Pearl, Nadia, and Ecaterina.
AN/MPQ-64 Sentinel		United States	Pulse-Doppler 3D radar		4/8	Acquired between 2007 and 2008 to upgrade the HAWK systems to HAWK XXI standards. US State Department approved a request for selling 4 AN/MPQ-64 F1 Sentinel radars to Romania on 7 October 2024.
EL/M-2106 ATAR		Israel	3D radar		4	Active electronically scanned array (AESA) acquired in 2017 for use with the HAWK system.
GM200 MM		France	3D radar	GM200 MM/A	0/12	Romania chose the GM200 MM/A from Thales as a Gap Filler Radar. The purchase is funded through SAFE.

=== Support vehicles ===
Model	Image	Origin	Type	Variant	Details
Trucks
DAF		Netherlands	4×4 Truck	YA-4440 YA-4442	Used with the MIM-23 Hawk.
HEMTT		United States	8×8 Truck	M983	Used with the MIM-104 Patriot.
Mercedes-Benz		Germany	4×4 Truck	Arocs	Used with the TPS-77 radars.
ROMAN		Romania	4×4 Truck	14.206 FAEG	Used with the TPS-79 radars.

=== Emergency vehicles ===
Model	Image	Origin	Type	Numbers	Details
Ziegler Z8		Germany	Fire tender	8/14	First vehicles received February 2025. Deliveries will continue until 2027.

=== Aircraft armament ===
Model	Image	Origin	Type	Variant	Numbers	Details
Missiles
AGM-65 Maverick		United States	Air to surface missile	AGM-65H/KB	18	Used with the F-16.
AIM-120 AMRAAM		United States	Air to air missile	AIM-120C-7 AIM-120C-8	30+ 0/186	Used with the F-16. Romania is set to procure an additional 186 AIM-120C-8 missiles. The contract is valued at approximately $592 million.
AIM-9 Sidewinder		United States	Air to air missile	AIM-9M AIM-9X Block II	60 22/386	Used with the F-16. Up to 300 AIM-9X Sidewinder Block II missiles, along with additional training units and guidance systems were further purchased for an estimated $340.8 million.
Spike-ER		Israel	Anti-tank guided missile	170 mm	1,000 missiles	Used with attack helicopters IAR 330 Puma SOCAT.
Bombs
GBU-12 Paveway II		United States	Laser-guided bomb	Enhanced GBU-12	10	Used with the F-16.
GBU-39 Small Diameter Bomb		United States	Precision guided glide bomb	GBU-39B SDB-I	0/400	Used with the F-16.
JDAM		United States	Guidance kit		180	Used with the F-16, for Mark 83 and Mark 84 bombs.

== Naval Forces ==
=== Sea fleet ===
Class	Image	Origin	Type	Ships	Commissioned	Note
Submarine (1 in service)
Kilo		Soviet Union	Conventional submarine	S-521 Delfinul	1985	The submarine is not operational and is used for dockside training
Frigates (3 in service)
Mărășești		Romania	Multipurpose frigate	F111 Mărășești	1992	
Type 22		United Kingdom	Multipurpose frigates	F221 Regele Ferdinand F222 Regina Maria	2004 2005	The two frigates are to be modernized with American systems, after the approval of the United States.
Corvettes (5 in service)
Hisar		Turkey	Light corvette	Cvt 261 Contraamiral Roman	2026	Ex-TCG Akhisar, comissioned on 20 June 2026. Will be outfitted with NSM, VLS and CIWS systems in Romania.
Tetal-I		Romania	Multipurpose corvettes	Cvt 260 Amiral Petre Bărbuneanu Cvt 263 Vice-Amiral Eugeniu Roșca	1983 1987	Will be replaced by the 2 new OPV's and new Hisar Class Corevtte.
Tetal-II		Romania	Multipurpose corvettes	Cvt 264 Contraamiral Eustațiu Sebastian Cvt 265 Contraamiral Horia Macellariu	1989 1996	Will be replaced by the 2 new OPV's and new Hisar Class Corevtte.
Missile corvettes (3 in service)
Zborul		Soviet Union	Missile corvettes	NPR 188 Zborul NPR 189 Pescărușul NPR 190 Lăstunul	1989 1989 1991	The missile corvettes are to be modernized, according to the chief of the General Directorate for Armaments. The ships are to be armed with Naval Strike Missile systems.
Offshore patrol vessels
MMPV 90		Romania	Offshore patrol vessel	0/2	N/A	Two offshore patrol vessels will be purchased through SAFE and built by Rheinmetall at the Mangalia shipyard. The ships, of the MMPV 90 type, will be armed with Oto Melara 76 mm guns, Oerlikon Millennium CIWS, and RIM-116 RAM launchers. They will also be equipped with German-made torpedoes and countermeasures, and NSM systems will be mounted later on.
Mine warfare (6 in service)
Musca		Romania	Minesweepers	DM-25 Lt. Lupu Dinescu DM-29 Lt. Dimitrie Nicolescu DM-30 Slt. Alexandru Axente	1989 1989 1989	
Sandown		United Kingdom	Minehunter	M270 Sublocotenent Ion Ghiculescu M271 Căpitan Constantin Dumitrescu	2023 2025	Ex-HMS Blyth, transferred on 27 September 2023. Ex-HMS Pembroke transferred on 4 August 2025.
Cosar		Romania	Minelayer	PM-274 Viceamiral Constantin Bălescu	1981	

=== River fleet ===
Class	Image	Origin	Type	Ships	Commissioned	Note
River monitors (3 in service)
Mihail Kogălniceanu		Romania	River monitors	M45 Mihail Kogălniceanu M46 Ion C. Brătianu M47 Lascăr Catargiu	1993 1994 1996	
Gunboats (5 in service)
Smârdan		Romania	Armoured patrol boats	VBF 176 Rahova VBF 177 Opanez VBF 178 Smârdan VBF 179 Posada VBF 180 Rovine	1987 1989 1990 1990 1993	
Patrol boats (15 in service)
VD 141		Romania	Patrol boats	VD 142 Lt. Alexandru Cristodorescu VD 143 Lt. Cdor. Alexandru Băluș VD 147 Lt. Cdor. Constantin Constantinescu VD 148 Lt. Constantin Beiu VD 149 Lt. Paul Apostolescu VD 150 Lt. Cdor. Nicolae Filip VD 151 Lt. Aurel Cornățeanu VD 154 Slt. Marin Dumitrescu VD 157 Cpt. Tiberiu Sîrbu VD 159 Asp. Cristian Zlatian VD 163 Lt. Mircea Metz VD 165 Lt. Ion Alexandrescu	1980	Part of the 88 River Patrol Boat Squadron. Organized in two sections, one based at Brăila and the other one at Tulcea.
ESM12		Romania	Patrol boat	522 Eugeniu Botez 102 Constantin Ciuchi 103 Dimitrie Știubei	2022 2024 2025	Fast intervention motorboat for marines, EOD specialists and navy divers.
Metal Shark 38 Defiant		United States	Patrol boat	N/A	–	Provided by United States through a 16.4 million $ contract within Foreign Military Sales (FMS). According to the contract, the vessels are to be delivered by July 2027.

=== Auxiliary vessels ===
Class	Image	Origin	Type	Ships	Commissioned	Note
Auxiliary vessels
Egreta		Romania	Command ship	Egreta	1985	Coastal command ship.
Luceafărul		Romania	Command/Protocol ship	Luceafărul	1976	Coastal command and protocol ship.
Mureș		Romania	Command ship	Mureș	1986	River command ship. Also used for troop and material transport. Originally built as a presidential ship for Ceaușescu.
Siret		Romania	Command/Protocol ship	Siret	1971	River command and protocol ship. Originally built as a presidential ship for Ceaușescu.
Fortuna		Romania	Command/Protocol ship	Fortuna	1941	River command and protocol ship.
Gorch Fock		German Reich	Sail training ship	Mircea	1938	
Grigore Antipa		Romania	Survey ship	Grigore Antipa	1980	Used mainly as a navy divers ship. Modernized in 2023.
Croitor		Romania	Tender	NL-281 Constanța NL-283 Midia	1979	Constanța is allocated to the Frigate Flotilla and Midia is used as a Navy Divers training ship.
Venus		Romania	Navy divers ship	Saturn Venus	N/A	Fast ships specialized in supporting missions with autonomous divers for executing rapid underwater interventions up to a depth of 50 m.
PV43-M		Romania	Navy divers ship	0/2	N/A	On 28 April 2026, it was reported that two navy divers ships will be purchased through SAFE. The ships will be built by Rheinmetall at the Mangalia shipyard.
Project 1395		Romania	Hydrographics ship	NMH Cpt. cdor. Alexandru Cătuneanu	1993	
591		Romania	Auxiliary support ship	SFRS 591 SFRS 593 SFRS 596	1980s	Used for port maneuvers, logistical support and rescue operations.
Project A202		Romania	Tugboat	RM 101 Viteazul	1954	
Project 1395		Romania	Sea-going tugboat	Grozavul	1993	Is also used as an icebreaker.
Stan Tug 1606		Romania	Sea-going tugboat	Vârtosul Voinicul Vânjosul	2016	
Med Marine		Turkey	Sea-going tugboat	N/A	–	Three tugboats ordered from the Turkish company Med Marine in 2025. To be delivered within two years.
341		Romania	Tanker	341	1958	Supplying fuel and lubricants.
Project 1407		Romania	Oil tanker	TMM-531	1971	
Project 406/3		Romania	Oil tanker	Tulcea TMM-532	1992	
Lupeni		Romania	River tugboat	RF301 RF302 RF303 RF310 RF327 RF328	N/A	
457		Romania	River ferry	457	1980	Supplying food and drinking water to the river vessels.
C417		Romania	River barge	C417	1970	
Unmanned underwater and surface vehicles
REMUS		United States	Autonomous underwater vehicle	N/A	2023	Used by the minehunters.
SeaFox		Germany	Unmanned underwater vehicle	N/A	2023	Used by the minehunters.
Defender		United States	Remotely operated underwater vehicle	N/A	N/A	VideoRay Mission Specialist Defender ROV.
Squalus		Romania	Unmanned surface vehicle	N/A	N/A	Provided by the Autonomous Flight Technologies company. Developed with the Mircea cel Bătrân Naval Academy.

=== Rigid inflatable boats ===
Model	Image	Origin	Type	Details
3D Tender Patrol		France	Rigid inflatable boat	Used by EOD divers and Special Forces.
Asis Boats		United Arab Emirates	Rigid inflatable boat	Used by marines.
Bombard Commando C5		France	Rigid inflatable boat	Used by navy divers.

=== Amphibious vehicles ===
Model	Image	Origin	Type	Variant	Numbers	Details
Assault Amphibious Vehicle		United States	Amphibious armored personnel carrier	AAVP-7A1 AAVC-7A1 AAVR-7A1	9/53 0/8 0/4	On 27 July 2023, the United States Department of State approved a possible sale of 21 AAV-7A1 vehicles in three configurations to Romania. In September 2024, it was announced that another 44 AAV-7 will be purchased. The sale was approved in 2026. The first AAV-7s were delivered to Romania in 2026.

=== Naval aviation ===
Model	Image	Origin	Type	Variant	Numbers	Details
Helicopters
IAR 330		Romania	Maritime helicopter	Puma Naval	3	Include the SOCAT upgrade package; capable of carrying Sting Ray torpedoes. Currently operated from Navy frigates for search and rescue, medevac, maritime surveillance and ASW missions.
Airbus Helicopters		France; Romania	Maritime helicopter	H215M	0/2	Romania is to acquire 2 helicopters with Anti-surface warfare (ASuW) capabilities. The value of the contract is approximately 165 million euros. First helicopter to be delivered in 2026. The helicopters will be equipped with Marte-ER anti-ship missiles by MBDA Italy.
Unmanned Aerial Vehicles
AFT Hirrus		Romania	Unmanned aerial vehicle		Unknown	Hirrus L drones provided by the Autonomous Flight Technologies company.
DJI		China	Unmanned aerial vehicle	DJI Matrice 30T	Unknown	Also in service with the Land Forces.
Shield AI MQ-35A V-BAT		United States	Unmanned aerial vehicle		4	The first V-BAT drone system (four aircraft per system) is a donation by the United States through the Maritime Domain Awareness initiative with a value of approximately $18 million. A second phase will follow, in which the Naval Forces will make a government-to-government purchase of two additional V-BAT systems (eight aircraft) worth around $30 million. The first system was delivered by August 2026.

=== Coastal defense ===
Model	Image	Origin	Type	Variant	Numbers	Details
4K51 Rubezh		Soviet Union	Anti-ship mobile missile launcher	P-21/22 – P15 Termit	4	4 mobile launchers on MAZ – 543 8X8 platforms.
Naval Strike Missile		Norway	Anti-ship/land-attack missile		0/4	The purchased anti-ship missile systems include four mobile launch vehicles, a platform for command, control and communications, transport and loading/unloading platforms, sensors, initial logistics support, maintenance and testing equipment. The contract was signed in 2021, awarded in December 2022, and production started in January 2023. Funding will be covered by SAFE.
Surveillance equipment
TSP		United States	Surveillance system		4	Trailer-mounted Sensor Platform (TSP) systems for shore surveillance acquired through the United States Foreign Military Financing program.
Counter-UAV systems
BlackTalon		United States	Counter-UAS	BlackTalon 982	4	Scalable Multi-Sensor C-UAS Solution used for port defence. Provided by US company SPX Communication Technologies.
Underwater security systems
Sentinel		Unknown	Intruder Detection System		Unknown	Intruder Detection Sonar used for port defence against divers and UUVs.

== Planned, expected and potential investments ==
These are requests, prototypes, and weapons under development/testing which could enter service with the Romanian military.

Programme	Potential model	Image	Origin	Type	Numbers	Details
Infantry equipment
NATO type individual weapon system	–	–	Romania	Assault rifle Light machine gun Machine gun Sniper rifle Pistol Grenade launcher	240,000	In 2025, the Romanian Ministry of Defence announced the intention of acquiring NATO-compatible individual weapons to replace its old equipment. A previous agreement for the production of the ARX160 assault rifle and the Px4 Storm pistol was concluded with Beretta in cooperation with the Cugir Arms Factory in 2019. Participants in the contract tender included Beretta, the Colt CZ Group, FN Herstal, Heckler & Koch and SIG Sauer have also expressed interest in Romania's program. According to the list of SAFE funding programs published in April 2026, SIG Sauer was chosen. Funding through SAFE will cover the acquisition of 240,000 weapons. The complete "NATO type individual weapon system" program however includes procuring the following: 205,422 - 9×19 mm pistols; 18,048 - 9×19 mm automatic pistols; 40,384 - 7.62×51 mm assault rifles; 1,884 - .300 BLK assault rifles; 20,160 - 5.56×45 mm short-barrel assault rifles; 86,998 - 5.56×45 mm long-barrel assault rifles; 11,160 – 40 mm grenade launcers; 1,415 - 7.62×51 mm semi-automatic sniper rifles; 2,115 - 7.62×51 mm manual-action sniper rifles, convertible to 6.8×51mm; 28 - .338M manual-action sniper rifles; 4,838 - 5.56×45 mm light machine guns; 3,157 - 7.62×51 mm machine guns, convertible to 6.8×51 mm; 3 - .50 cal. naval machine guns
Armoured vehicles
Main Battle Tank	K2 Black Panther		Republic of Korea	Main Battle Tank	216	On 31 January 2023, Romanian military personnel visited Hyundai Rotem. According to experts, Romania showed interest in the tank. After an initial order for 54 M1A2 tanks was signed, it was announced that the MBT program might increase to 300 MBTs. Other offers could include the Leopard 2 or the K2 Black Panther. As reported in April 2024, the K2 underwent testing in Romania between 10 and 16 May. The tank was also present at the Black Sea Defense & Aerospace 2024 exposition. This will be a first step for a future contract with transfer of technology. Romania also met German defence industries related to future needs. With Norway, Germany, Italy, Czechia ordering the Leopard 2A8, the production will ramp up. In September 2025, it was reported that 216 tanks and 76 tank-chassis derivatives will be acquired. The production and maintenance of these tanks will be carried out locally. Rheinmetall has offered its new KF51 Panther main battle tank (MBT) to Romania.
Main Battle Tank	Leopard 2A8		Germany	Main Battle Tank	216	
Main Battle Tank	Panther KF51		Germany	Main Battle Tank	216	
Artillery
Wheeled 155 mm self-propelled howitzer system	ATMOS 2000		Israel; Romania	Self-propelled artillery	36	Of the five self-propelled artillery battalions, two are to be wheeled in contract worth $765 million. According to Gen. Incicaș, the wheeled battalions are intended for the Vânători de munte, while the tracked battalions are intended for the heavy infantry units and the armored brigade. Currently, Elbit Systems is confirmed to participate with the ATMOS system in the contract bid.
Engineering equipment
Pontoon bridges needs	Improved Ribbon Bridges (IRB) + M3 Amphibious Rig		Germany	Amphibious Bridging vehicle	Unknown	Romania is considering the purchase of Improved Ribbon Bridges (IRB) and M3 amphibious bridging vehicles for its future M1A2 Abrams tanks.
Unmanned ground vehicles
Unmanned ground vehicle program	GRUNT THeMIS		Republic of Korea; Estonia	Unmanned ground vehicle	–	As part of Romania's unmanned ground vehicle project, Hanwha Aerospace and Milrem Robotics partnered to offer the GRUNT and THeMIS vehicles. Otokar also offered a 6x6 Medium-2 UGV developed jointly with the Romanian company BlueSpace and the Turkish UGV developer Elektroland.
Unmanned ground vehicle program	6x6 Medium-2 UGV		Turkey; Romania	Unmanned ground vehicle	–	As part of Romania's unmanned ground vehicle project, Hanwha Aerospace and Milrem Robotics partnered to offer the GRUNT and THeMIS vehicles. Otokar also offered a 6x6 Medium-2 UGV developed jointly with the Romanian company BlueSpace and the Turkish UGV developer Elektroland.
Air Defence
Passive radar system for airspace surveillance	–	(illustration)	–	Passive radar	12 systems	Acquisition program of 441 million lei to be launched in 2024.
Aircraft
Romanian drone programme	Cuda	–	Romania; United States	Quadrotor UAV	–	All drones developed and produced by the Romanian company Carfil and the US-based company Periscope Aviation: Cuda - Reconnaissance drone.; Kraken - Long range ISR VTOL drone.; Phoenix - Heavy cargo drone capable of carrying a 61.2 kg (135 lb) payload.; Sirin - Reconnaissance and cargo drone capable of operating in maritime conditions with a payload of 14.5 kg (32 lb).; Spectre - FPV kamikaze drone capable of carrying a 2.5 kg (5.5 lb) warhead.; Stingray - Long range ISR SUAS.
Romanian drone programme	Phoenix	–	Romania; United States	Quadrotor UAV	–	All drones developed and produced by the Romanian company Carfil and the US-based company Periscope Aviation: Cuda - Reconnaissance drone.; Kraken - Long range ISR VTOL drone.; Phoenix - Heavy cargo drone capable of carrying a 61.2 kg (135 lb) payload.; Sirin - Reconnaissance and cargo drone capable of operating in maritime conditions with a payload of 14.5 kg (32 lb).; Spectre - FPV kamikaze drone capable of carrying a 2.5 kg (5.5 lb) warhead.; Stingray - Long range ISR SUAS.
Romanian drone programme	Sirin	–	Romania; United States	Quadrotor UAV	–	All drones developed and produced by the Romanian company Carfil and the US-based company Periscope Aviation: Cuda - Reconnaissance drone.; Kraken - Long range ISR VTOL drone.; Phoenix - Heavy cargo drone capable of carrying a 61.2 kg (135 lb) payload.; Sirin - Reconnaissance and cargo drone capable of operating in maritime conditions with a payload of 14.5 kg (32 lb).; Spectre - FPV kamikaze drone capable of carrying a 2.5 kg (5.5 lb) warhead.; Stingray - Long range ISR SUAS.
Romanian drone programme	Stingray	–	Romania; United States	Quadrotor UAV	–	All drones developed and produced by the Romanian company Carfil and the US-based company Periscope Aviation: Cuda - Reconnaissance drone.; Kraken - Long range ISR VTOL drone.; Phoenix - Heavy cargo drone capable of carrying a 61.2 kg (135 lb) payload.; Sirin - Reconnaissance and cargo drone capable of operating in maritime conditions with a payload of 14.5 kg (32 lb).; Spectre - FPV kamikaze drone capable of carrying a 2.5 kg (5.5 lb) warhead.; Stingray - Long range ISR SUAS.
Romanian drone programme	Spectre	–	Romania; United States	Loitering munition	–	All drones developed and produced by the Romanian company Carfil and the US-based company Periscope Aviation: Cuda - Reconnaissance drone.; Kraken - Long range ISR VTOL drone.; Phoenix - Heavy cargo drone capable of carrying a 61.2 kg (135 lb) payload.; Sirin - Reconnaissance and cargo drone capable of operating in maritime conditions with a payload of 14.5 kg (32 lb).; Spectre - FPV kamikaze drone capable of carrying a 2.5 kg (5.5 lb) warhead.; Stingray - Long range ISR SUAS.
Romanian drone programme	Kraken	–	Romania; United States	VTOL UAV	–	All drones developed and produced by the Romanian company Carfil and the US-based company Periscope Aviation: Cuda - Reconnaissance drone.; Kraken - Long range ISR VTOL drone.; Phoenix - Heavy cargo drone capable of carrying a 61.2 kg (135 lb) payload.; Sirin - Reconnaissance and cargo drone capable of operating in maritime conditions with a payload of 14.5 kg (32 lb).; Spectre - FPV kamikaze drone capable of carrying a 2.5 kg (5.5 lb) warhead.; Stingray - Long range ISR SUAS.
Electronic warfare
Mobile electronic warfare system	–	–	–	Electronic warfare	21 systems	Mobile electronic warfare system (21 systems of various types, with an estimated contract value of around €1 billion). The acquisition has already received parliamentary approval, but updated approval is required since the program has been redefined in certain segments.
Aircraft armament
Joint procurement Coalition	Joint Strike Missile		Norway	Air-launched cruise missile	-	During the 2026 Ankara NATO summit, Romania joined the Coalition for the procurement of NSM and JSM missiles alongside the US, UK and Norway.
Ships
European patrol corvette programme	European Patrol Corvette		European Union	Multi-mission corvette	4	After the contract on the Gowind 2500-class corvettes was canceled on 8 August 2023, following disagreements on the price of constructing the corvettes, Romania intends to remain part of the European multi-purpose corvette program. The country joined the program in June 2023. In 2025, Romania signed the cooperation agreement with OCCAR for the acquisition of the corvettes. The first corvette is expected to be delivered in 2030, with the rest being delivered by 2035.
Frigate programme	–	–	Romania	Frigate	3	As part of the Romanian Navy endowment programme spanning 20 years, plans are to build three new frigates.
Command and control
C4I systems with ISTAR integration capabilities	–	–	–	Command and control	17 systems	An integrated communications and information system for battalion-type units and C4I systems with ISTAR integration capabilities for brigade-level command posts (17 systems in total, with an estimated value of nearly 850 million lei, scheduled for delivery between 2027 and 2030)
Satellites
Satellite systems	Corvus	–	Romania	SIGINT satellite	1	A 6-unit nanosatellite developed by a consortium led by the Romanian InSpace Engineering (RISE) company. To be operated by the Communications and Informatics Command with the role of detecting radio interference in Romania. Corvus is to be placed in Low Earth Orbit. As of February 2026, the Ministry of Defense is looking for a satellite launch service.
Military communications satellite system	–	–	Romania	Communications satellite	1	Romania is to start the acquisition procedure of a military satellite intended for communications in 2024. It was noted at BSDA 2024 that Israel Aerospace Industries will provide the Romanian military with satellite systems and discussions were held with the COMOTI Institute for fulfilling the offset agreement.

== Stored equipment ==
Model	Image	Origin	Type	Numbers	Details
M 1993		Romania	98 mm mountain howitzer	5	Replaced with the M1982 120 mm mortars in 2004.
ML-20		Soviet Union	152 mm gun-howitzer	4	
Md. 89		Romania	122 mm self-propelled howitzer	42	2S1 turret on MLI-84 chassis. In storage since 2005.
2S1		Soviet Union	122 mm self-propelled howitzer	6	In storage since 2005.
TR-580		Romania	Main battle tank	9	In storage. Number can be higher and not all are in functional condition.
T-72		Soviet Union	Main battle tank	-	28 tanks (5 operational, 23 need repairs) are for sale. Bought from the USSR between 1978 and 1979. In 2022, it was reported that Romania could donate its stored T-72s to Ukraine.
M82		Romania	130 mm towed gun	75	72 pieces for sale. Licensed built after the Chinese Type 59–1, itself a copy of the Soviet 130 mm towed field gun M1954 M-46. Romania also produced a 76 mm mountain gun designated M82 and a 120 mm mortar designated M 1982.
SU-100		Czechoslovakia	100 mm self-propelled anti-tank gun	23-47	In storage. Acquired by 1957. Used as firing range targets.
Mikoyan-Gurevich MiG-21 LanceR		Soviet Union	Fighter and interceptor aircraft	25	The Romanian Air Force has retired the last of its MiG-21 LanceR on 15 May 2023. The aircraft are stored at the 95th Air Base. According to Jane's World Air Forces, there were 17 single-seat LanceR C and 8 twin-seat LanceR B in service at the time of retirement.

== Former equipment ==
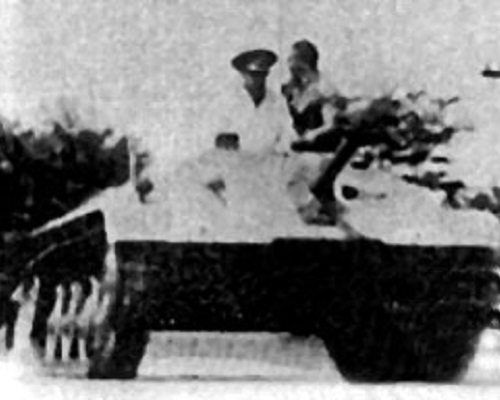
Mareșal tank destroyer, a vehicle of the Romanian army during the Second World War

== See also ==
- Arms industry in Romania
