= MAT-76 mine =

Romanian anti-tank blast mine

The MAT-76 is a large circular Romanian minimum metal anti-tank blast mine. It is similar to the MAT-62B mine, sharing a fuze. The mine is actually a cast block of TNT with a thin coating of fibreglass. The mine has a central fuze well that normally uses a P-62 pressure fuze, although it can be used with any of the fuzes designed for the Russian TM-62 and TM-72 series of mines. The bakelite plastic used in the fuze of a MAT-76 may become brittle in desert conditions, which can reduce the activation pressure. This may make the mine unstable i.e. can detonate simply by handling it. The mine is found in Angola, Iraq, Kuwait, Liberia, Mozambique, and Zambia.

== Specifications ==
- Diameter: 320 mm
- Height: 135 mm
- Weight: 10 kg
- Explosive content: 9.5 kg of TNT
- Operating pressure: 200 kg
