= MAT-62B mine =

Anti-tank blast mine

The MAT-62B is a Romanian plastic cased circular anti-tank blast mine. It is very similar to the Russian TM-62P2. The mine has a central fuze well which accepts the bakelite P-62 pressure fuze, which contains a CD-11R detonator. The mine can accept fuzes from the Russian TM-62 and TM-72 series of landmines. The low metal content of the mine makes it difficult to detect. A caseless version of the mine, the MAT-76 mine is also produced.

It is possible for the bakelite fuze to deteriorate in desert conditions i.e. reducing the activation pressure required to trigger detonation. In such cases there is a possibility that the mine may detonate simply by handling it.

== Specifications ==
- Diameter: 0.32 m
- Height: 0.132 m
- Weight: 9.8 kg
- Explosive content: 7.2 kg of cast TNT
- Operating pressure: 200 kg +
