= MPP-B Wierzba mine =

Fibreglass Polish anti-tank blast mine

The MPP-B "Wierzba" is a fibreglass Polish minimum metal anti-tank blast mine. The mine is similar to the Russian TM-62 series and is compatible with the same fuses. It is normally used with a MWCz-62 fuse with a clockwork arming delay, which is a copy of the Russian MVCh-62. The mine has a secondary fuse well in the base of the mine for anti-handling devices or for a command detonation device. It can also be used with a ZMN electronic combined pressure and magnetic influence fuse.

The mine is currently in service with the Polish armed forces.

== Specifications (with MWCz-62) ==
- Diameter: 320 mm
- Height: 128 mm
- Weight: 9.7 kg
- Explosive content: 8.1 kg
