= Detașamentul de Căutare-Salvare prin Luptă =

Combat Search and Rescue Detachment
- Detașamentul de Căutare-Salvare prin Luptă
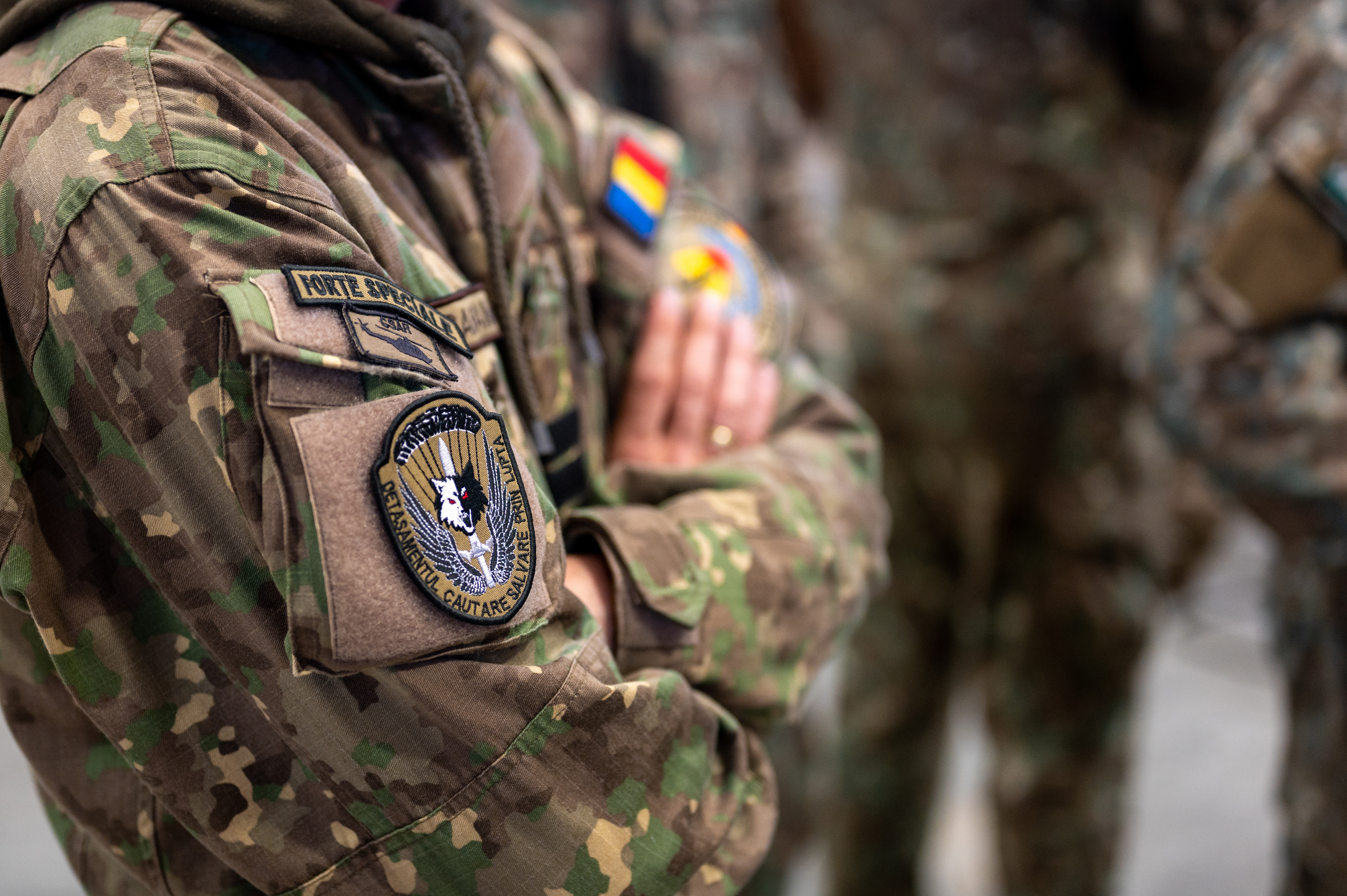
- DCSL operator during an exercise with the 352nd Special Operations Wing
- Active: 1 September 2008 – present
- Country: Romania
- Branch: Romanian Air Force
- Role: Special Operations
- Size: 3 combat teams
- Garrison/HQ: Bucharest

Detașamentul de Căutare-Salvare prin Luptă (DCSL, Combat Search and Rescue Detachment) is an elite special operations forces unit of the Romanian Air Force constituted in 2008. Its primary task is rescuing downed airmen in enemy territory.

== History ==
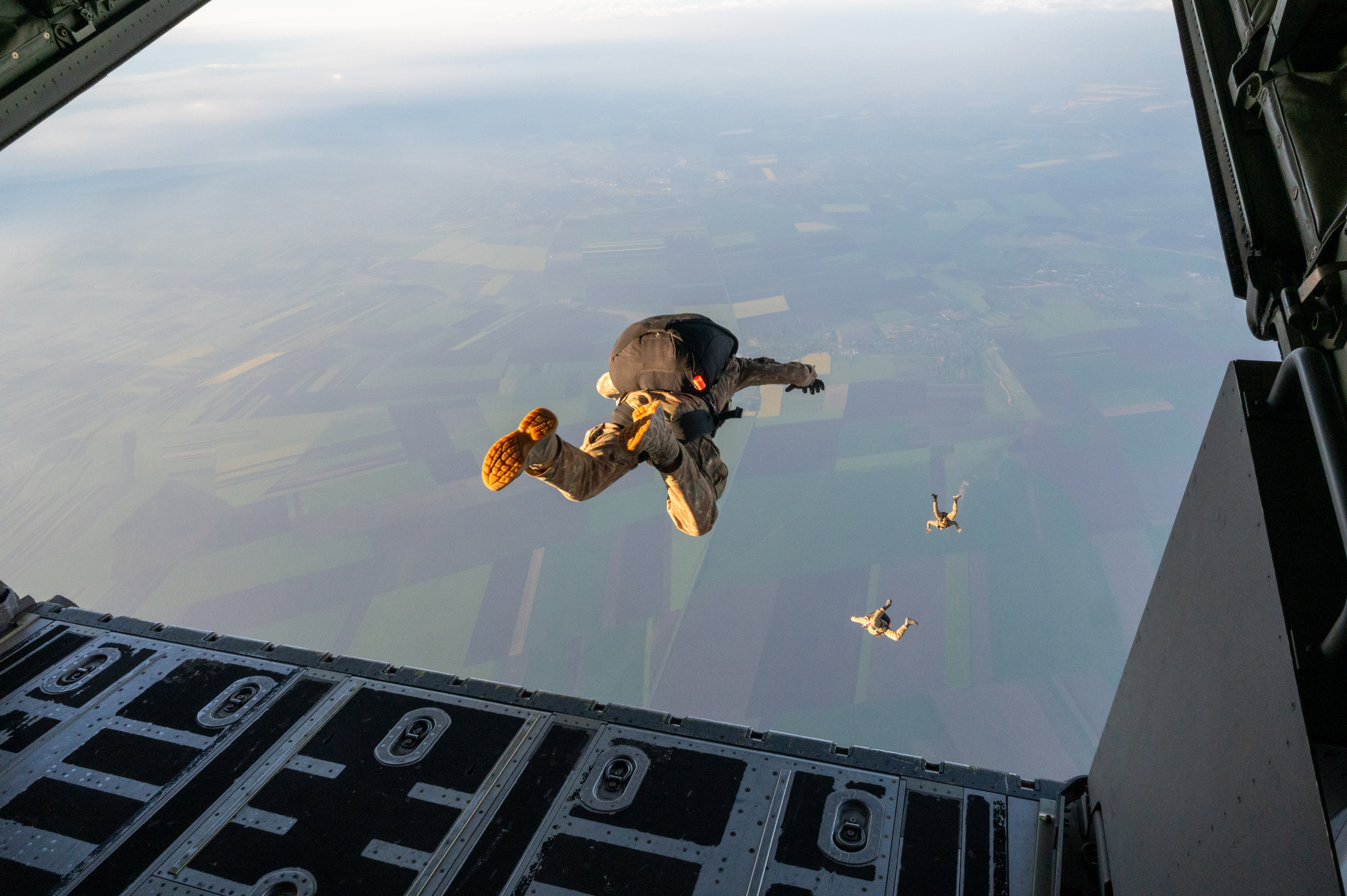
DCSL soldiers conducting a military free-fall exercise from an American MC-130J

The Romanian Air Force had several elite battalions since the 1980s. These were first organized as paratrooper regiments, then converted to a brigade and three independent battalions under Air Force command. With the reorganization of the Air Force in the 1990s, two paratrooper battalions were transformed into special forces battalions. All paratroopers, including the special forces units, were transferred to the Romanian Land Forces by 2002.

In the mid-2000s, the need for a dedicated combat search and rescue unit appeared. As the Romanian Armed Forces did not need a large unit to fulfill the role, the decision was taken to create a detachment-sized unit. Named the Combat Search and Rescue Detachment, the special forces unit was established on 1 September 2008 and placed under the command of the Air Force General Staff which lacked special forces units by that point.

The main task of the Combat Search and Rescue Detachment is to rescue downed airmen in enemy territory during combat operations. As a special forces unit, its equipment is similar to the units of the Special Operations Forces Command. The detachment comprises three combat teams all headquartered in Bucharest. The operators mainly deploy on IAR 330 helicopters.

Though no official operation has been disclosed, it has been rumored that DCSL operators were attached to various units during Romania's deployments to Afghanistan.
