= EL/M-2106 =

Israeli military radar

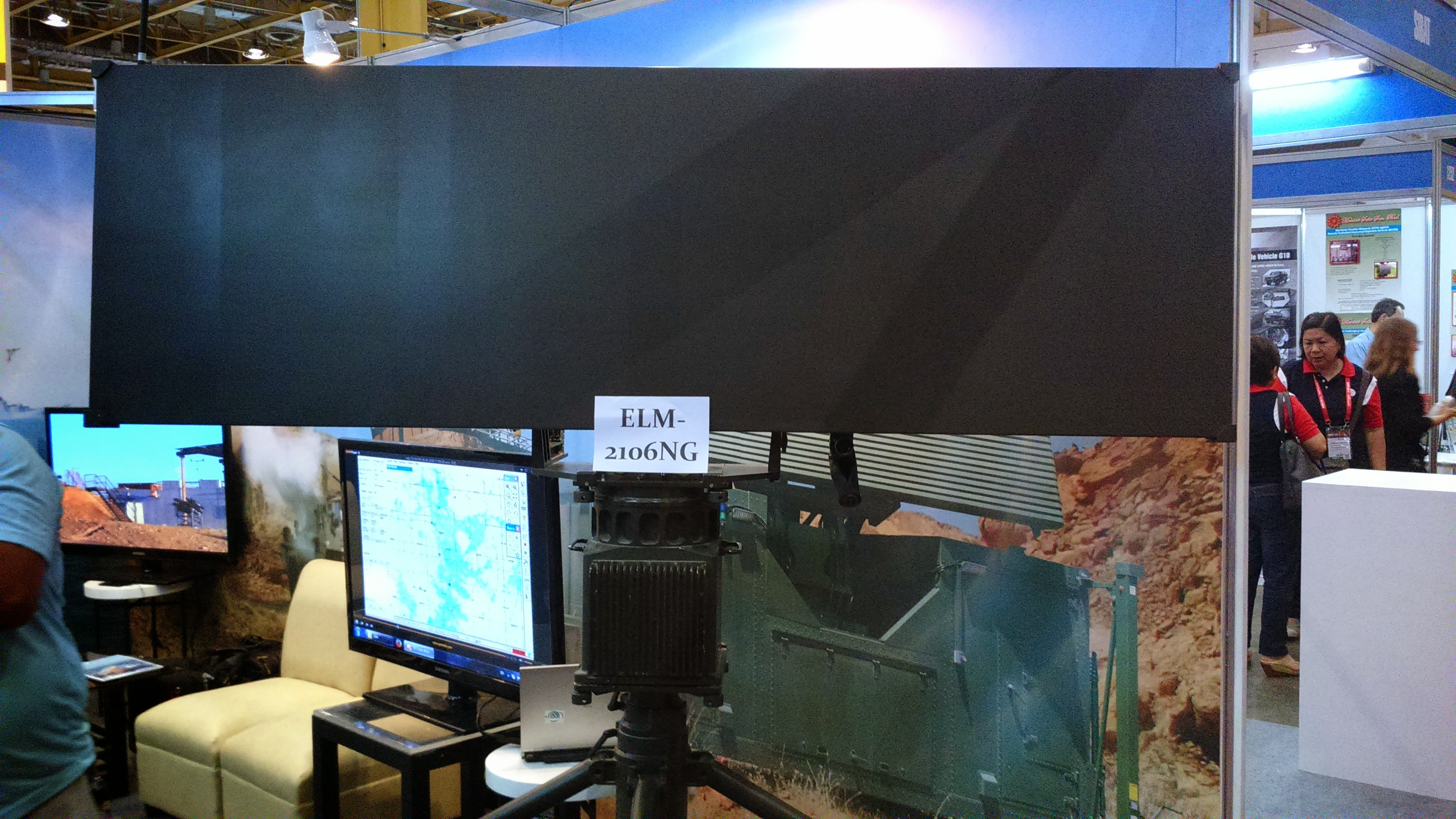
A mockup of an EL/M-2106NG radar

EL/M-2106 ATAR (Advanced Tactical Acquisition Radar) is a solid state L band medium range tactical 3D radar with active electronically scanned array (AESA) in elevation.

== History ==
The radar, developed by Elta Systems, detects a wide variety of low RCS target such as low velocity ultra-lights and UAVs.

The radar can track up to 500 targets simultaneously, has 360° operation and all-weather day and night ability and includes advanced electronic counter-countermeasures (ECCM) to operate in dense hostile electronic warfare environments.

It is a field proven design that has operated in undesirable environments. The range of detection for a fighter aircraft is 70–110 km. It can detect hovering helicopters at a range of 40 km and UAVs at 40–60 km.

Used on the SPYDER air defense system.
