= TM-62 =

Soviet anti-tank mine

TM-62 mine
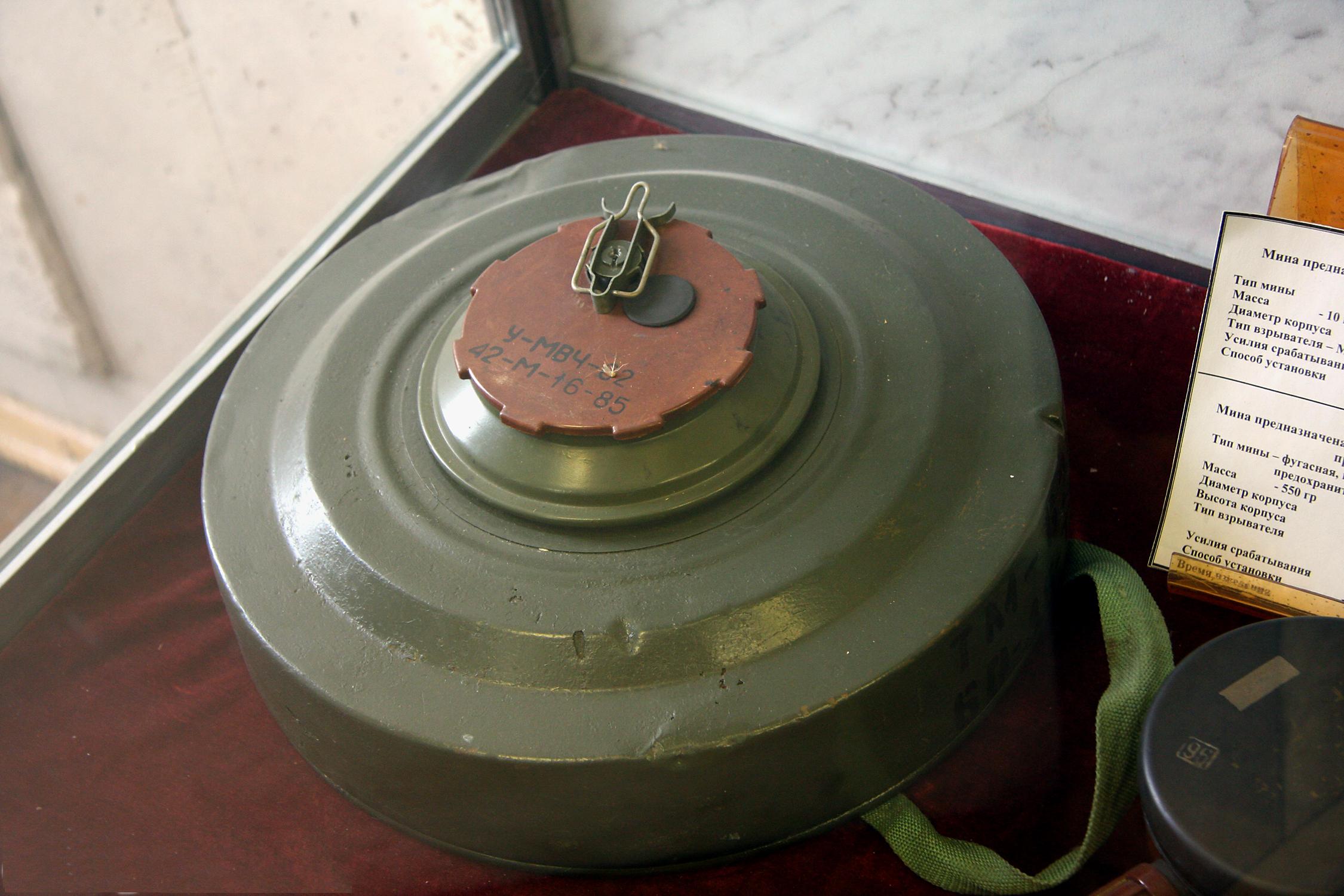
- Type: Anti-tank blast mine
- Place of origin: Soviet Union

Service history
- Used by: See Users
- Wars: Rhodesian Bush War; South African Border War; Angolan Civil War; Mozambican Civil War; Second Sudanese Civil War; First Nagorno-Karabakh War; Russo-Ukrainian War; Second Nagorno-Karabakh War

Production history
- Variants: See Variants

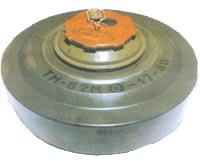
TM-62M – the wire safety clip is still in place; the mine has not been armed

The TM-62 is a series of Soviet anti-tank blast mines produced in various variants. It served as the primary anti-tank landmine for the Soviet military. It has a central fuze and typically a 7.5 kilograms (17 lb) explosive charge, but the variants differ greatly in detail. The mine can be laid manually or automatically from a mine laying machine including the PMR-1, PMR-2 wheeled towed mine layers, the GMZ-3 tracked mine laying vehicle and the VMR-2 helicopter mine laying system. The TM-62 can be fitted with the same fuzes as the TM-72, which include MVN-72 and MVN-80 fuzes, which are vibration and magnetism sensitive. The mine was used in the Russo-Ukrainian war for antitank and antipersonnel use (as satchel charges).

== Russo-Ukrainian War ==
Both Ukrainian and Russian soldiers have been observed to use modified TM-62s as thrown satchel charges. In addition, Ukrainian forces have deployed drones equipped with modified TM-62 payloads for precision strikes. Strikes by a Russian UAV drone, the "Molniya-2," using a TM-62 mine as a warhead, have also been documented starting January 2025.

On 9 January 2026, German publication BILD released footage of Russian soldiers with an African “volunteer” with a TM-62 anti-tank mine strapped to body armour over his chest. The African soldier would then detonate the landmine, acting as a “kamikaze can opener” for fortified Ukrainian positions. According to the BILD journalist, Julian Röpke, the “Russian army is now using African mercenaries as “can openers.”

== Variants ==
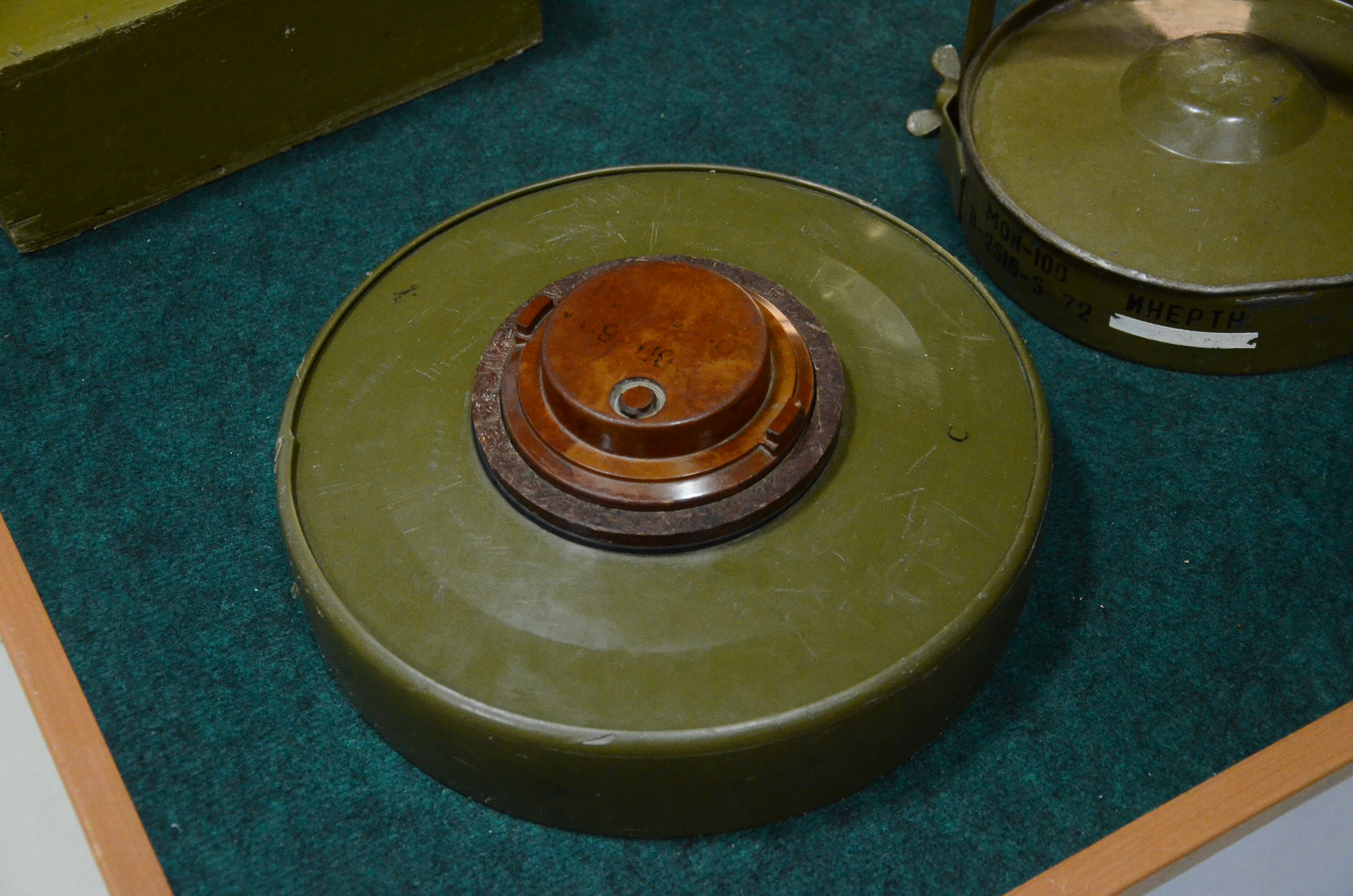
TM-62 mine

- TM-62M, with a circular metal case. It is the most widely employed variant.
- TM-62B, with a paper or cardboard case – basically a block of cast explosive with a fuze set into the center.
- TM-62D, with a wooden case.
- TM-62P, TM-62P2 and TM-62P3, with plastic cases. The TM-62P and TM-62P2 mine cases have ribbed sides, whereas the TM-62P3 has a smooth casing.
- TM-62T, with a fabric and epoxy casing and a central fuze.

== Fuzes ==
- MVZ-62
- MVCh-62, the standard fuze with a clockwork arming delay of 30 to 120 seconds.
- MVN-62
- MVN-72, with a combination of electronics and clockwork, after an initial arming delay the magnetic influence fuze is enabled, powered by a 1.5 V battery.
- MVN-80, an improved version of the MVN-72.
- VM-62Z
- MVP-62, with a pneumatic bellows arming delay of 20 to 300 seconds. The delay mechanism uses a minimum of metal making it difficult to detect when used with one of the minimum metal cases.
- MVP-62M
- ZN-97, a magnetic influence fuze made in Poland.

Magnetic influence fuzes provide full-width attack, i.e. any part of the target vehicle passing over the mine will trigger detonation, not just the track or wheels. However, since magnetic fuzes are electronic, their operational life relies on battery power. Ultimately the battery will run down, after which the mine no longer functions. In contrast, a purely mechanical fuze (usually triggered via a Belleville spring) gives a much longer operational life e.g., mines planted 50 years previously will still detonate if a target vehicle drives over them.

It is easy to boobytrap a TM-62 mine by attaching a pull-fuze to it, or by concealing an MS-3, ML-7 or an ML-8 device underneath it. All three of these anti-handling devices function via pressure-release and therefore will trigger detonation if the mine is lifted from its position.

== Specifications (TM-62M with MVZ-62 fuze) ==
- Weight: 9.5 kilograms (21 lb)
- Explosive content: 7.5 kilograms (17 lb) of TNT (although sometimes combinations of RDX/TNT/Aluminium or Amatol mixes are used)
- Diameter: 320 millimetres (13 in)
- Height: 128 millimetres (5.0 in)
- Operating pressure: 150 to 550 kilograms (330 to 1,210 lb)

== Users ==
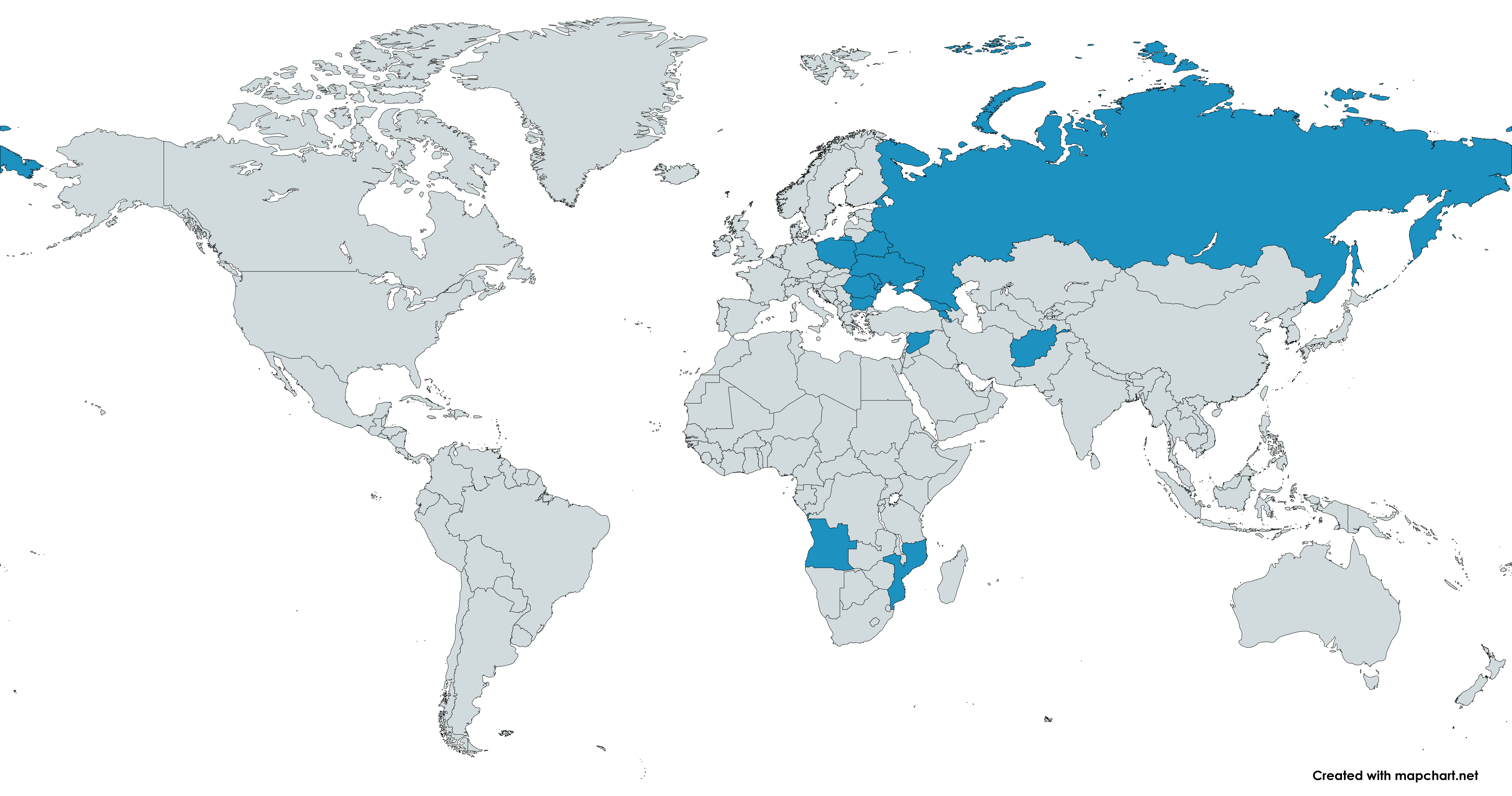
Map with TM-62 users in blue

- Afghanistan
- Armenia
- Angola
- Belarus
- Bulgaria
- Georgia
- Moldova
- Mozambique
- Poland, as the MPP-B Wierzba mine
- Romania, as the MAT-62B mine
- Russia
- Syria
- Ukraine

=== Former users ===
- Soviet Union

== See also ==
- TM-46 anti-tank landmine
- M15 mine
