= M1120 HEMTT Load Handling System =

M1120 Heavy Expanded Mobility Tactical Truck (HEMTT)
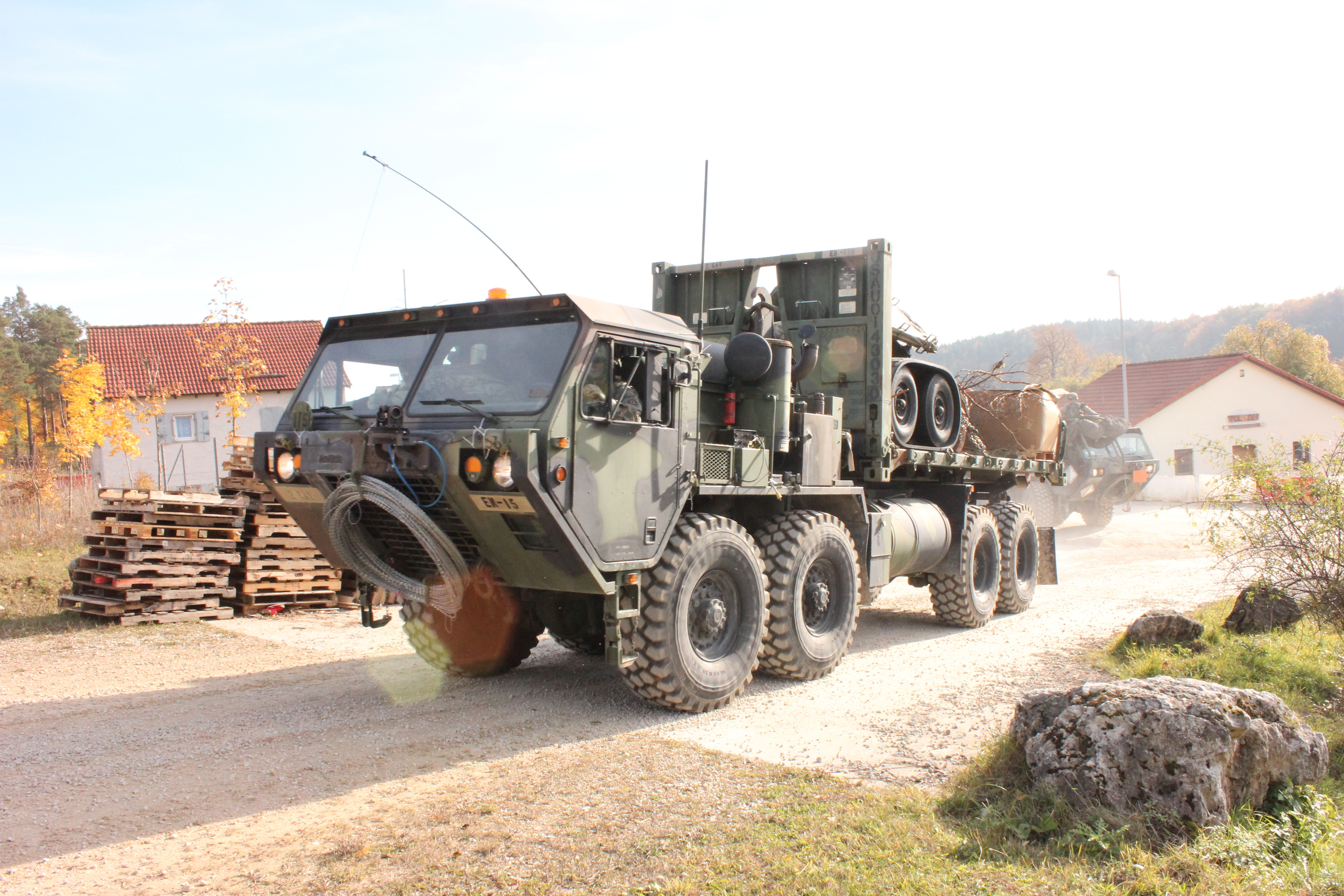
- HEMTT M1120A2 with standard softskin (unarmored) cab
- Type: 10-ton, 8×8 heavy tactical truck
- Place of origin: United States

Service history
- Used by: U.S. Army

Production history
- Designer: Oshkosh Corporation
- Designed: 1981 (base HEMTT)
- Manufacturer: Oshkosh Corporation
- Produced: 1999-present (1982–present for HEMTT family)
- No. built: 35,800 (total new build; 14,000 of these remanufactured)
- Variants: M1120A2 Load Handling System (LHS). M1120A4 LHS. M1977A0 Common Bridge Transporter (CBT). M1977A2 CBT. M1977A4 CBT.

Specifications (M1120A4)
- Mass: 40,000 lb (18,144 kg) unladen; 71,000 lb (32,205 kg) laden (a-kit); 77,500 lb (35,153 kg) laden (b-kit); 109,000 lb (49,441 kg) (GCWR)
- Length: 402 in (10.207 m)
- Width: 96 in (2.438 m)
- Height: 118 in (3.003 m) (over spare tire)
- Crew: 2
- Armor: a-kit/b-kit; U.S. Army Long Term Armor Strategy (LTAS) compliant
- Engine: Caterpillar (CAT) C15, 15.2-liter, 6-cylinder inline water-cooled EPA 2004 compliant diesel 515 hp (384 kW)
- Payload capacity: rated at 10 tons
- Transmission: Allison 4500SP 5-speed automatic with Oshkosh enhanced 55,000 2 speed transfer case
- Suspension: Holland ADS-240 air (front); Holland AD-246 air (rear)
- Fuel capacity: 155 US gal (587 L)
- Operational range: 300 mi (483 km) loaded
- Maximum speed: 62 mph (100 km/h)
- Steering system: power-assisted on front tandem

The M1120 HEMTT LHS (Load Handling System) is a M977 Heavy Expanded Mobility Tactical Truck with a load handling system in place of a flat bed/cargo body. The HEMTT is an eight-wheel drive, diesel-powered, tactical truck used by the US military and others. The HEMTT is manufactured by Oshkosh Defense and entered Army service in 1982, with the M1120 variant first produced in 1999.

== History ==
Following the evaluation of proposals submitted by AM General, MAN, Pacific Car & Foundry (PACCAR) and Oshkosh Truck Corporation, In May 1981, the then U.S. Army Tank Automotive Command awarded an initial five-year contract valued at US$251.13 million to Oshkosh Truck Corporation for production of the 10 ton (9,070 kg) 8 x 8 Heavy Expanded Mobility Tactical Truck (HEMTT).

The M1120 LHS variant was initially introduced as part of the HEMTT overhaul/rebuild programme, during which returned M977 Cargo variants have their cargo bodies and materials handling cranes removed, to be replaced by a Multilift Mark 5 (now designated MPH165-LHS) load handling system, as fitted to the Oshkosh PLS truck. Other modifications include an upgrade of the rear suspension.

The first rebuilt M1120 was produced in late-1999, with new build M1120A2 examples (now A4) available from February 2004.

By mid 2021 Oshkosh had manufactured (new build) 35,800 HEMTTs of all types. Specific figures for the M1120 LHS variant are not available.

For reference, original HEMTT models now have the suffix A0. Only the M984 wrecker was produced in A1 configuration. All models were produced in A2 configuration. The A3 suffix is applied to HEMTT technology demonstrators with a diesel-electric drive system. All current HEMTT production models have the suffix A4.

== Description ==
The HEMTT was developed from the outset as a tactical truck, but to minimize procurement and life cycle costs included militarized commercial automotive components where possible, these including the engine and transmission. Some components used in early HEMTTs are common with the Oshkosh Logistics Vehicle System (LVS) vehicles which were supplied to the U.S. Marine Corps.

The chassis of the M1120 is formed of 257 × 89 × 9.5 mm heat-treated carbon manganese steel with a yield strength of 758 MPa. With the exception of the wrecker variant, this chassis is common on all HEMTT variants Bolted construction with Grade 8 bolts is used throughout. A centrally mounted self-recovery winch is an option and this is fitted to around 20% of production.

The two-door forward control cab seats two. It is of heavy-duty welded steel construction with corrosion-resistant sheet metal skins. Add-on armor kits were produced by Simula Inc. and BAE Systems. The current HEMTT A4 is fitted with the slightly larger from the Oshkosh PLS A1. This cab complies with the U.S. Army's Long Term Armor Strategy (LTAS) requirements of an A- and B-kit armoring philosophy. It also comes as standard with integrated floor armor, an integrated mount for a machine gun and gunner protection kit, and air-conditioning.

A Detroit Diesel 8V92TA V-8 two-stroke DDECIV diesel developing 445 hp is fitted to A2 HEMTTs. An EPA 2004 compliant Caterpillar (CAT) C-15 six-cylinder, 15.2-liter diesel developing a peak of 515 hp is fitted to HEMTT A4 models. HEMTT A2 models have an Allison HD 4560P 6F/1R automatic transmission coupled to an Oshkosh 5500 series 2-speed transfer case, while A4 varinats are fitted with an Allison 4500SP 5F/1R automatic transmission and an uprated version of the 55,000 series two-speed transfer case.

The front axles on all HEMTTs are single-reduction Oshkosh 46K, the rear are Dana DS480 single-reduction. Drive to the front axles is selectable and all axles have differential locks. Suspension on the A2 variant is by Hendrickson RT40 leaf springs with equalizing beams. Suspension on A4 models is Holland air suspension, ADS-240 (front) and AD-246 (rear). Tire size is 1600 R20 on all models, and standard tire fit is Michelin XZL.

All M1120 variants are capable of fording water crossings up to 48 inches deep, and can climb a gradient of at least 60%. All M1120 variants are air transportable in the C-130 and C-17 transport aircraft.

The M1120 HEMTT LHS is fitted with Multilift Mark 5 (now designated MPH165-PLS) load handling system, this an imperial variant of the Mark 4/MPH165 that is further-modified to include a folding hook arm to bring the system within C-130 Hercules air-transport height constraints. The MPH165-PLS system is produced under licence by Oshkosh and is also fitted to the M1074 and M1075 PLS and Logistic Vehicle System Replacement (LVSR). The MKVI LHS (now designated MPH165-CBT) is a further development of the MPH165-PLS and has additional fixings and hydraulic couplings for the Bridge Adapter Pallet (BAP). This is fitted to the M1977 Common Bridge Transporter (CBT) variant of the HEMTT.

The Multilift MPH (Military Pivoting Hooklift) range is based around commercially proven technologies, the overall system performance being improved by enhancing below ground pick up and the ability to load misaligned flatracks, both important military operational requirements. The complete system is designed to be used in all operational conditions, including darkness or while wearing nuclear, biological and chemical (NBC) protective equipment. An automatic, fully sequenced control system mounted in the cab aids operational safety and maximises speed, even under battle conditions. The MPH range was designed and optimised to load, transport and unload flatracks conforming to the NATO standard (STANAG 2413). Flatracks can be pre-loaded at base with any military payload ready for dispersal to the required location. Payloads such as MLRS rockets, light armoured vehicles and command/control shelters can also be transported by using purpose-built flatracks with the correct locking systems built in.

In U.S. Army service the M1120 can be equipped with several different styles of flatracks for the load handling system. The M1077 and M1077A1 General Purpose A-frame flatracks are sideless flatracks used to transport pallets of ammunition and other classes of supplies. M1077 flatracks are 6.058 m long, 2.438 m wide, and 1.5915 m high over the A-frame. On the ISO-compatible Palletized Flatrack (IPF) Type M1 there are two end walls, one incorporating the A-frame. Both walls can fold down inwardly for stacking when empty. The dimensions of the IPF are the same as for the M1077, apart from the end walls that have a height of 2.083 m. The M3/M3A1 Container Roll-in/Out Platform (CROP) is a flatrack that fits inside a 20 ft. ISO container. The Container Handling Unit (CHU) is an add-on kit that allows for the loading/unloading and transport of standard ISO containers without the need for an intermediate flatrack.

The SOFRAME RM 22 PLM load handling trailer which was originally selected as the M1076 trailer component of the US Army's PLS is compatible with, and used with, the M1120 HEMTT. The RM 22/M1076 is a three-axle dolly-type trailer. It uses a mainframe assembled using electric welding, with a secondary frame supporting the front axle on a turning table and the drawbar; a steering lock allows the steering to be fixed when required. Two axles are provided at the rear and braking is on all three axles. Flatracks can be on- and off-loaded from the trailer by the prime mover's load handling system.

== M1977 HEMTT Common Bridge Transporter (CBT) ==
The M1977 HEMTT Common Bridge Transporter (CBT) is a further development of the M1120 LHS, and in common with the M1120 LHS was initially introduced as part of the HEMTT overhaul/rebuild program. It is used for loading, transporting, and unloading Ribbon Bridge components and bridge erection boats.

== Gallery ==
M1120 Heavy Expanded Mobility Tactical Truck (HEMTT) models

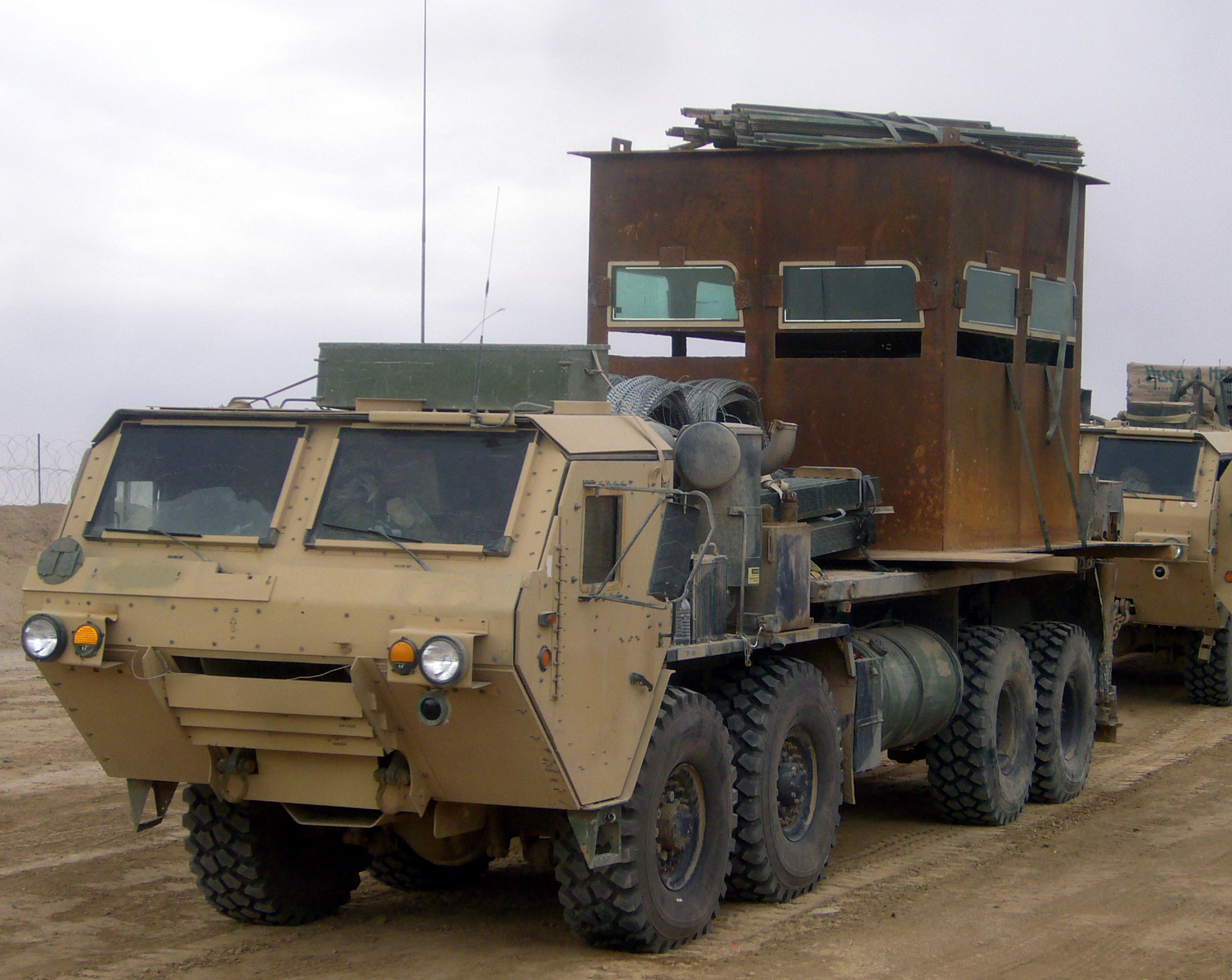
HEMTT M1120A2 with an early Simula-supplied cab armoring kit in Iraq

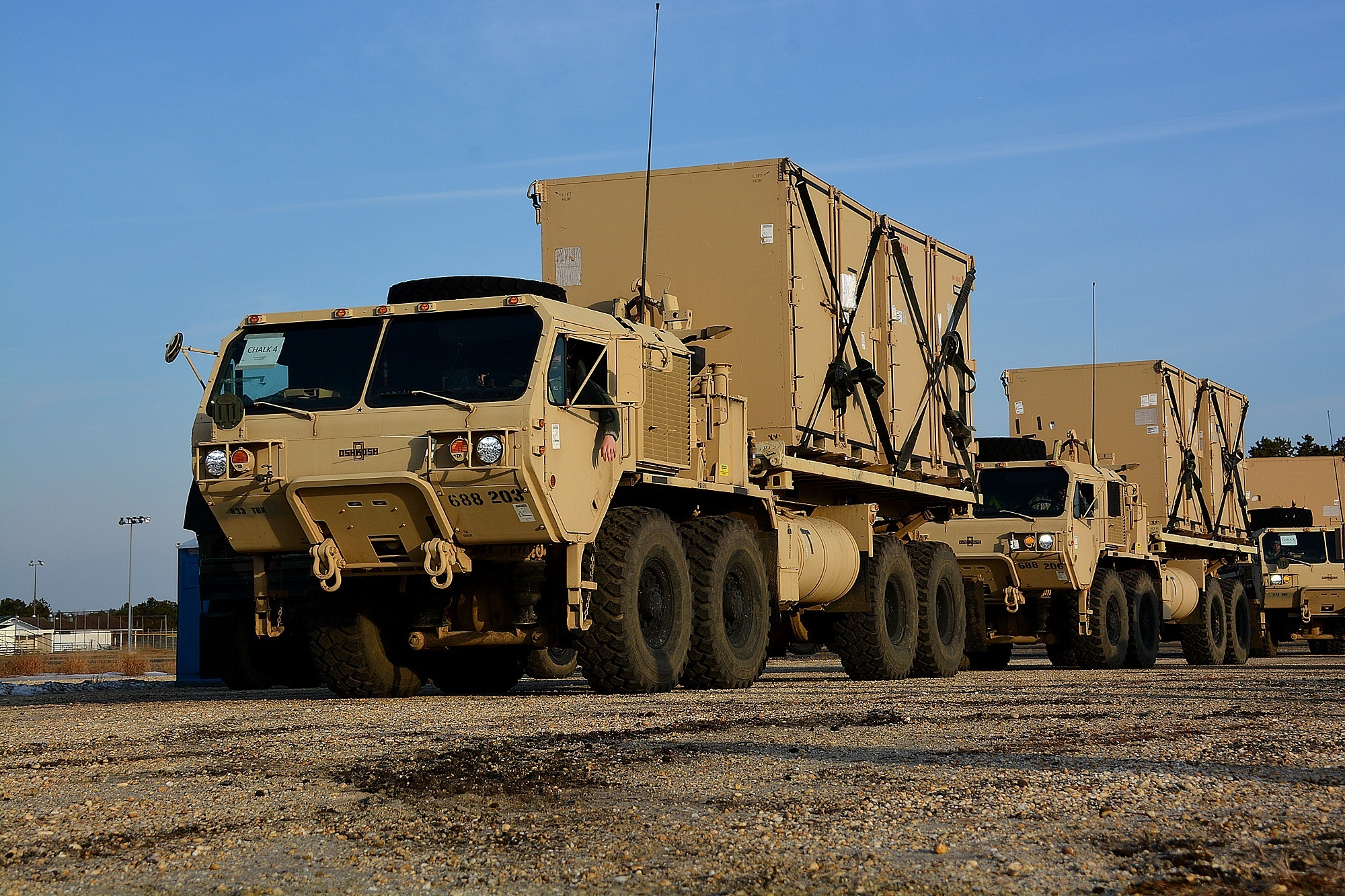
M1120A4 HEMTTs with A-kit (unarmored) cab

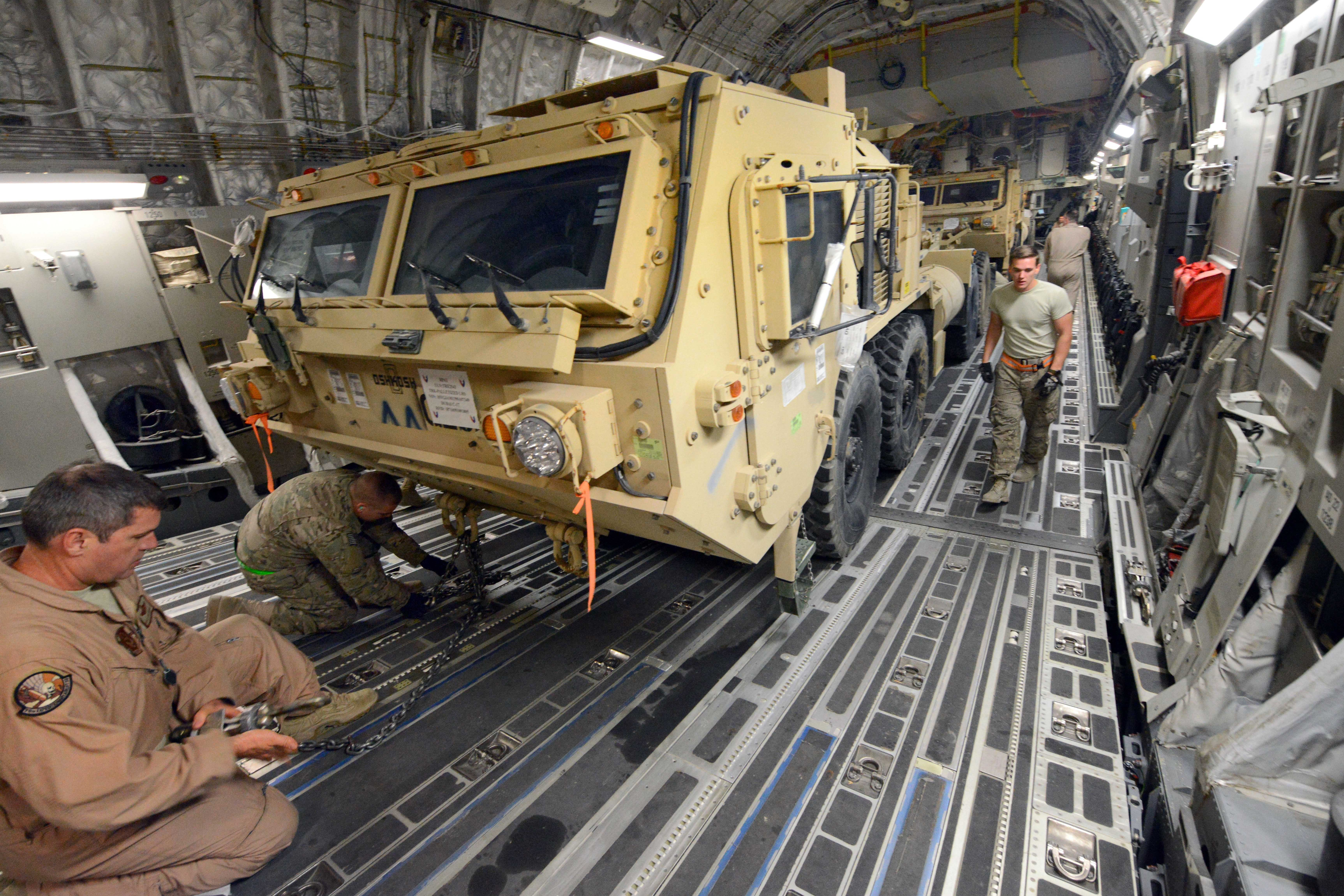
M1120A4 HEMTT with B-kit armor added to the standard A-kit cab

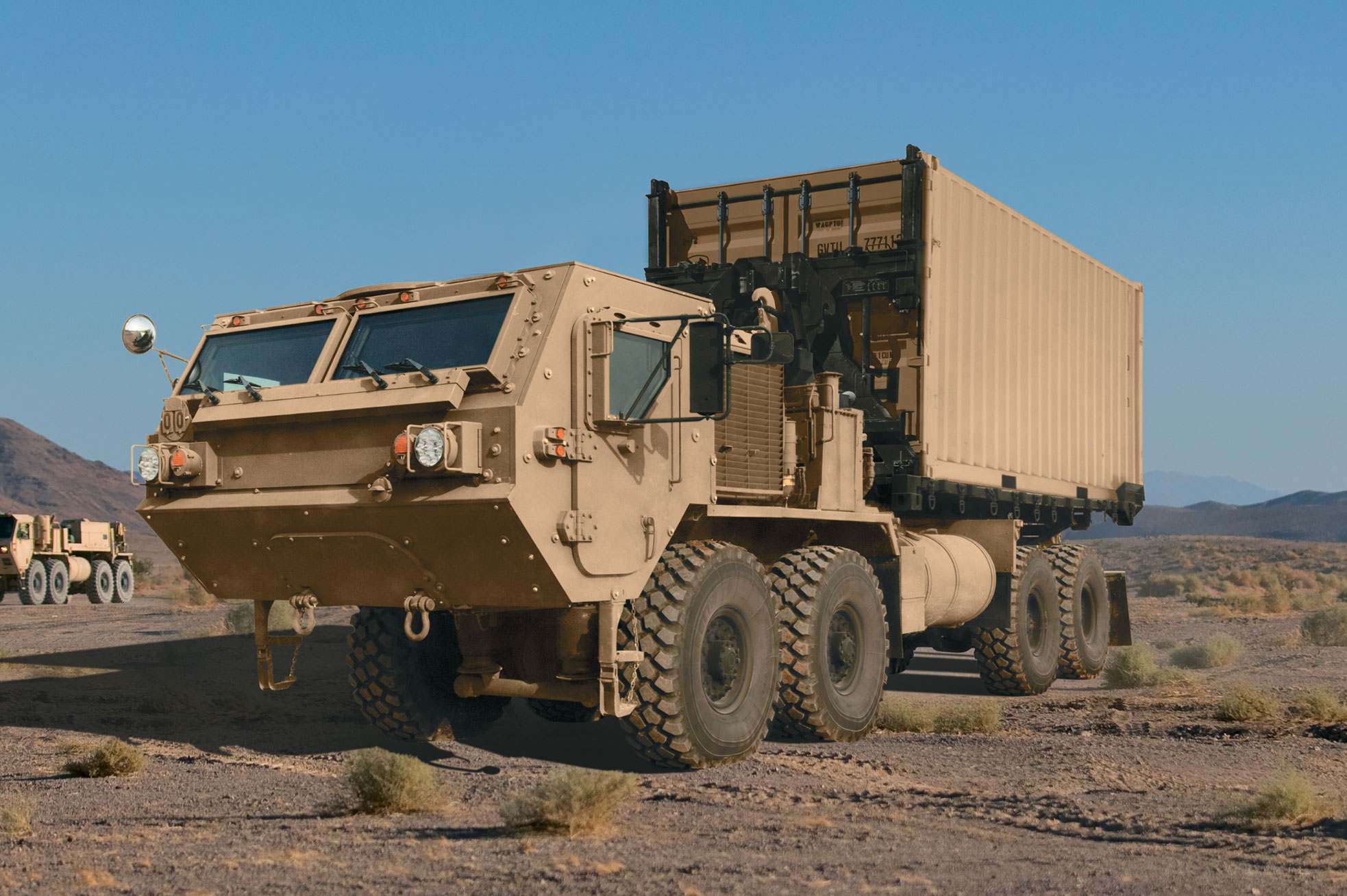
Oshkosh M1120A4 HEMTT LHS with B-kit armored cab.

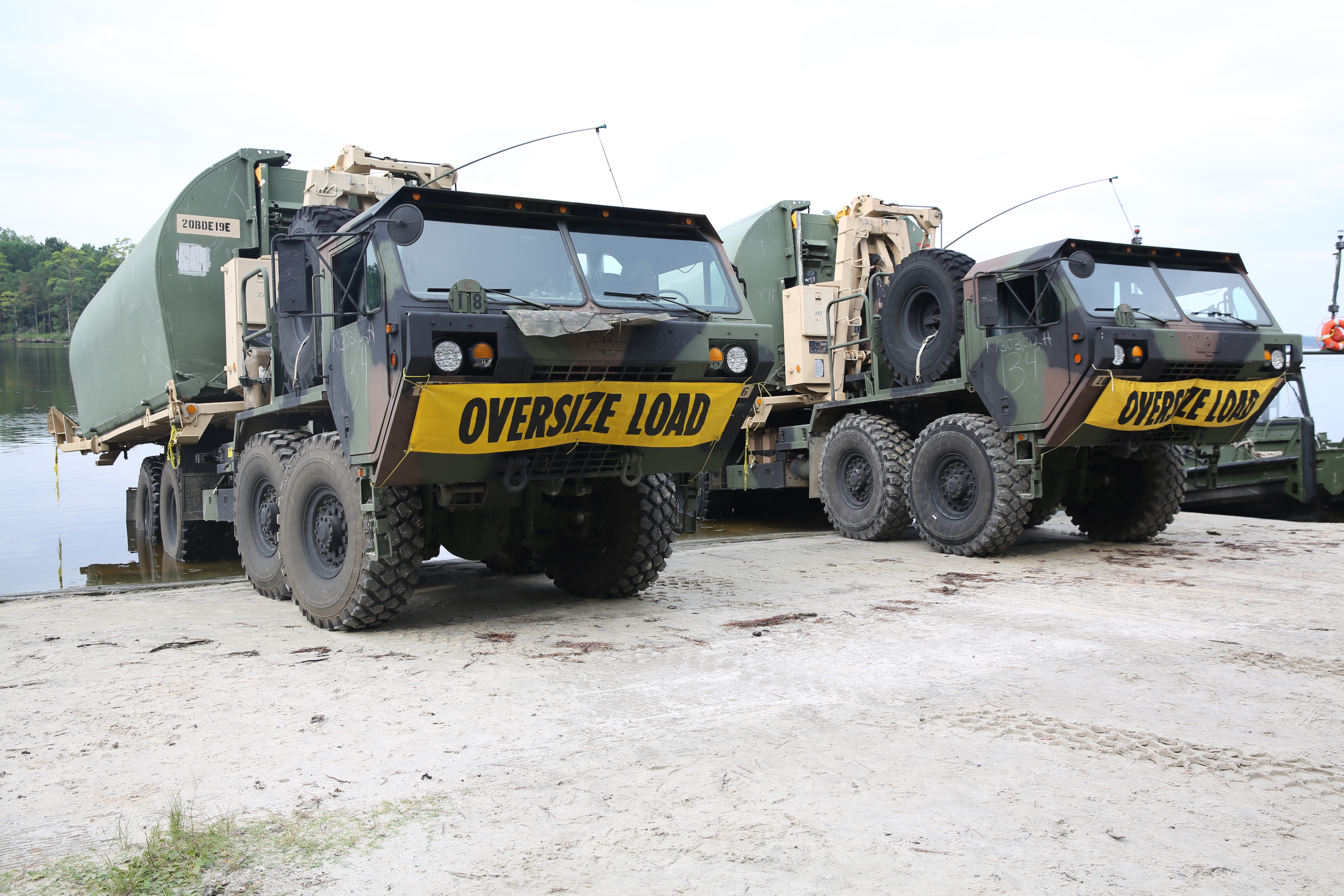
HEMTT M1977A2 CBTs with standard unarmored cab. The M1977 HEMTT is a further development of the M1120 LHS

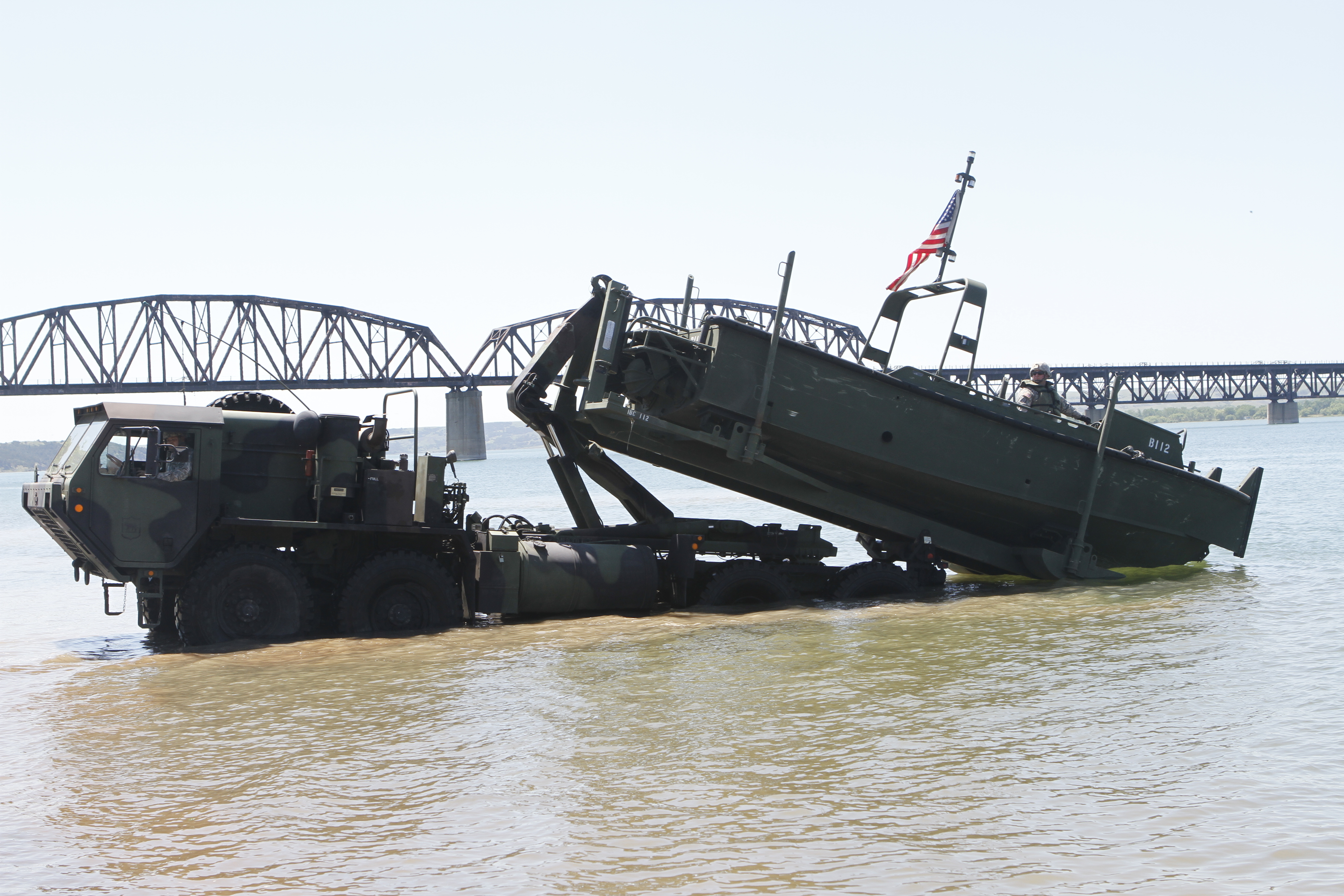
U.S. Army soldiers unload a Mk2 Bridge Erection Boat from a M1977A2 CBT HEMTT into the Missouri River

== See also ==
- M939 Truck
- Oshkosh L-ATV
- Oshkosh M-ATV
- Palletized Load System
- Medium Tactical Vehicle Replacement
- Family of Medium Tactical Vehicles
- Oshkosh Corporation
- Plasan Sand Cat
- TerraMax (vehicle)
- Heavy Equipment Transport System
- Logistics Vehicle System (LVS)
- US Army tactical truck engines
- U.S. Army equipment M-numbers

== References (bibliography) ==
- Modern U.S. Military Vehicles by Fred Crismon ISBN 0760305269
- HEMTT - US Heavy Expanded Mobility Tactical truck by Carl Schulze (published by Tankograd) Tankograd
- Brothers of HEMTT - PLS-LVS by Carl Schulze (published by Tankograd) Tankograd
- U.S. Army, Technical Manual, TM 9-2320-279-24P-1, DIRECT SUPPORT AND GENERAL SUPPORT MAINTENANCE REPAIR PARTS AND TOOLS LIST FOR M977 SERIES, 8X8 HEAVY EXPANDED MOBILITY TACTICA, (HEMTT), TRUCK, CARGO, WITH WINCH M977, (NSN 2320-01-097-0260), (E TRUCK, CARGO, WITHOUT WINCH M977, (2320-01-099-6426), (EIC: B2G), TANK, FUEL, WITH WINCH M978, (2320-01-097-0249), (EIC: B2C), TRUCK FUEL WITHOUT WINCH M978, (2320-01-100-7672), (EIC: B2H), TRUCK, TR WITH WINCH, WITHOUT CRANE M983, (2320-01-097-0247), (EIC: B2A), TR WRECKER-RECOVERY M984, (2320-01-097-0248), (EIC: B2A), TRUCK, WREC. Publisher - U.S. Army, U.S. Dept of Defense, U.S. Air Force, www.armytechnicalmanuals.com (10 Aug. 2010) website
- Jane's Land Warfare Platforms 2014/2015: Logistics, Support & Unmanned ISBN 0710631308 Jane’s Land Warfare Platforms: Logistics, Support & Unmanned
- Jane's Land Warfare Platforms 2015-2016: Logistics, Support & Unmanned ISBN 0710631723
- Jane's Military Vehicles & Logistics 2004-2005 ISBN 0710626312 Jane’s Land Warfare Platforms: Logistics, Support & Unmanned
- Oshkosh Trucks: 75 Years of Specialty Truck Production Paperback – November, 1992 (ISBN 0879386614)
