= Combat team =

Military Unit

A combat team is temporary grouping of military organizations of differing types to accomplish a defined mission or objective. Usage varies between commonwealth nations, where the term applies to a sub-unit level grouping, and the United States, where the term is found at unit and formation levels.

== Commonwealth Armies' Combat Teams ==
NATO Map Symbols
Infantry Combat Team
Armoured Combat Team
Square Combat Team

In commonwealth nations combat team is a temporary combined-arms grouping of based on a combat sub-unit (an infantry or armoured sub-unit) with attached supporting arms. In Canadian Army doctrine, a combat team is a sub-unit grouping based on an infantry company or a tank squadron with elements of the other arm attached as well as other supporting elements such as combat engineers and artillery observers. A square combat team is the combination of both an infantry company and an armoured squadron with supporting elements attached. The British Army uses the term "combat team" interchangeably with "company group" or "task group."

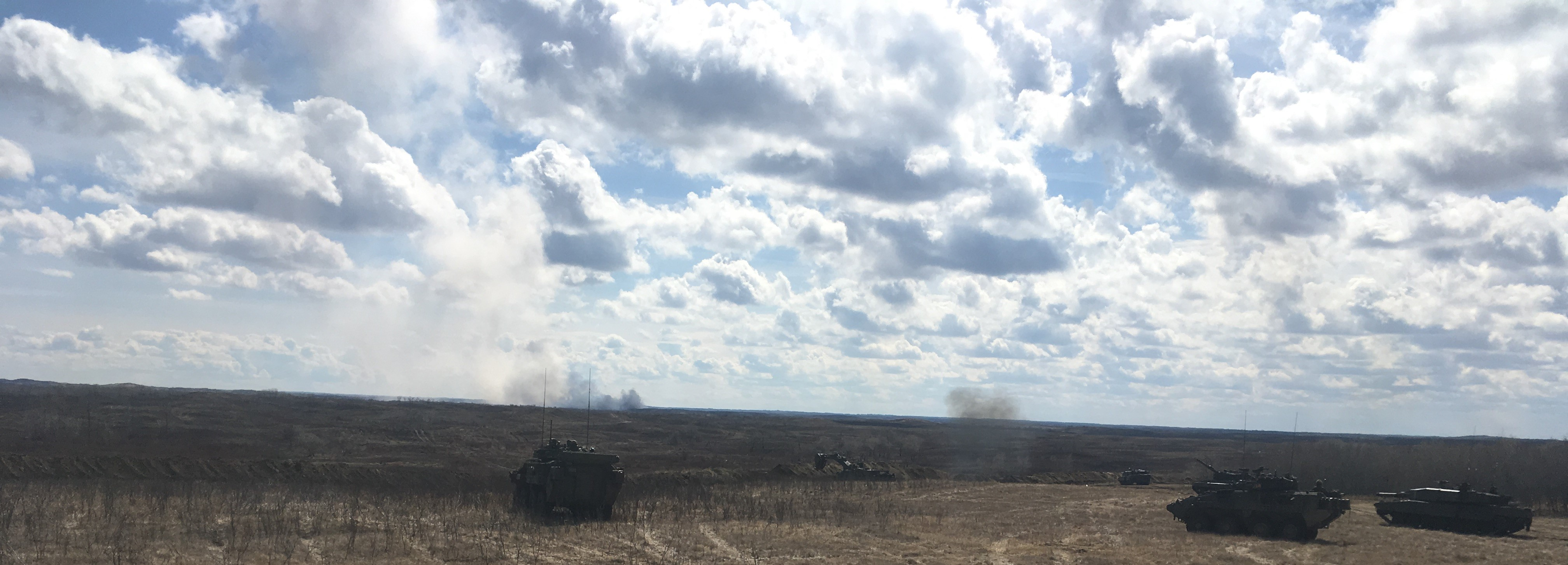
A combat team comprising infantry of Princess Patricia's Canadian Light Infantry and tanks of the Lord Strathcona's Horse (Royal Canadians) train at the Canadian Manoeuvre Training Center, Wainwright

== US Army and Marine Combat Teams ==
NATO Map Symbols
Armoured Battalion Combat Team
Infantry Regimental Combat Team
Armoured Regimental Combat Team
Armoured Brigade Combat Team
Infantry Brigade Combat Team
Stryker Brigade Combat Team

In US Armed Forces usage, "combat team" is not defined as a term by itself but it is found in inside larger labels for combined arms formations such as regimental combat team and brigade combat team. US Army doctrine has at least once referenced an armoured battalion combat team.

As a result of the US Army transforming to triangular divisions between 1940 and 1942, infantry brigades were replaced by infantry regiments. Through the Second World War, the US Army would form Regimental Combat Teams, consisting of an infantry regiment with additional attached combat and support elements tailored to a specific mission, whenever there was a requirement for an independent infantry formation smaller than division. By the end of the Second World War, infantry regiments that were not part of a division and been reorganized as regimental combat teams, and many division commanders had re-organized their infantry regiments as regimental combat teams. The regimental combat team continued to be used by the US Army through the Korean War and until the adoption of the pentomic division in 1957.

The United States Marine Corps also used the regimental combat team structure through the Second World War but it referred to these as brigades, and it was only in the 1990s that reinforced USMC regiments became known as regimental combat teams.

The US Army defines a brigade combat team as a "combined arms organization consisting of a brigade headquarters, at least two maneuver battalions, and necessary supporting functional capabilities." In 2003, almost all US Army manoeuvre brigades were reorganized as brigade combat teams. In Commonwealth nations, the term brigade group is generally used to describe a similar organization.

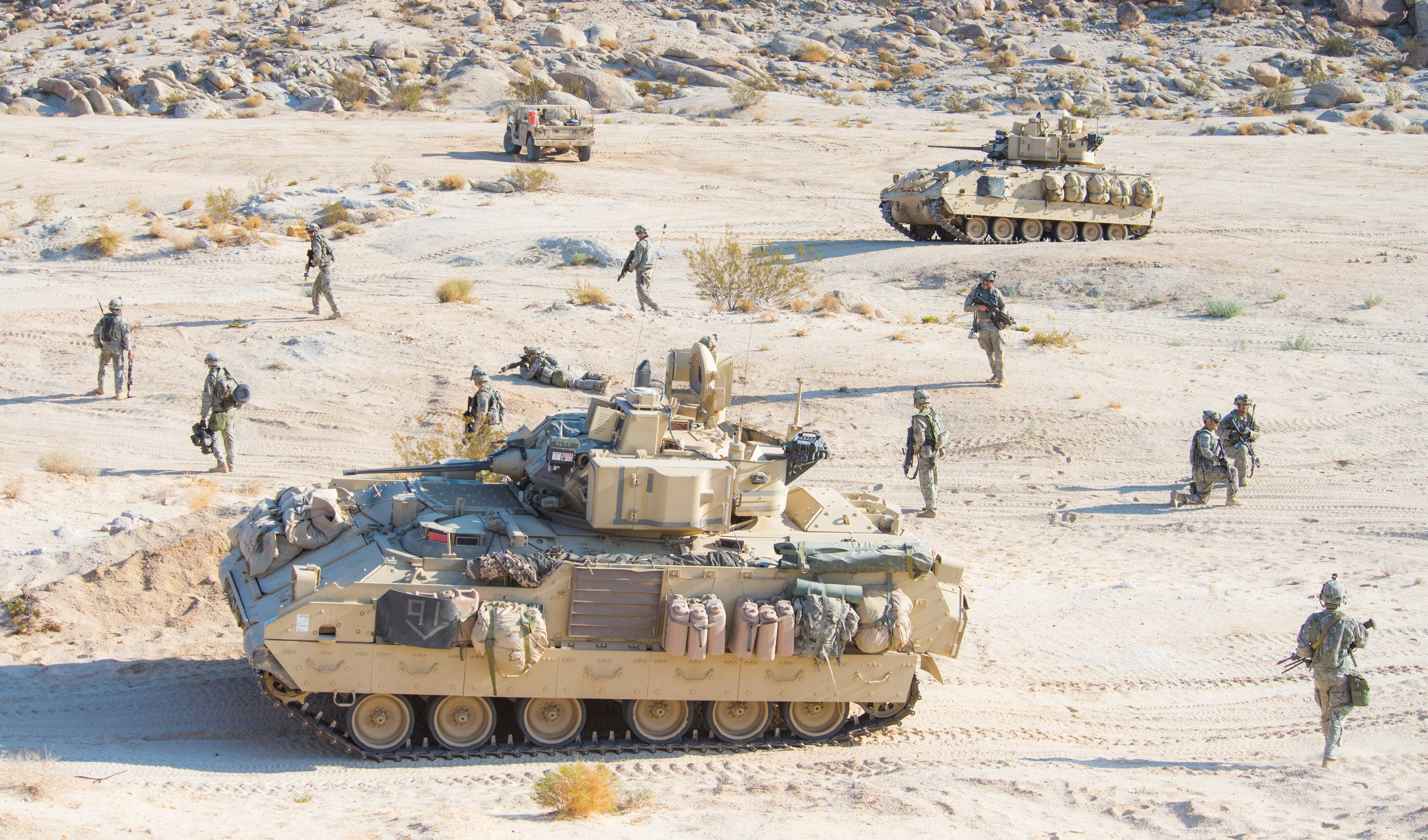
Infantry of 116th Cavalry Brigade Combat Team (CBCT) train at the National Training Center, Fort Irwin
