= TM-72 mine =

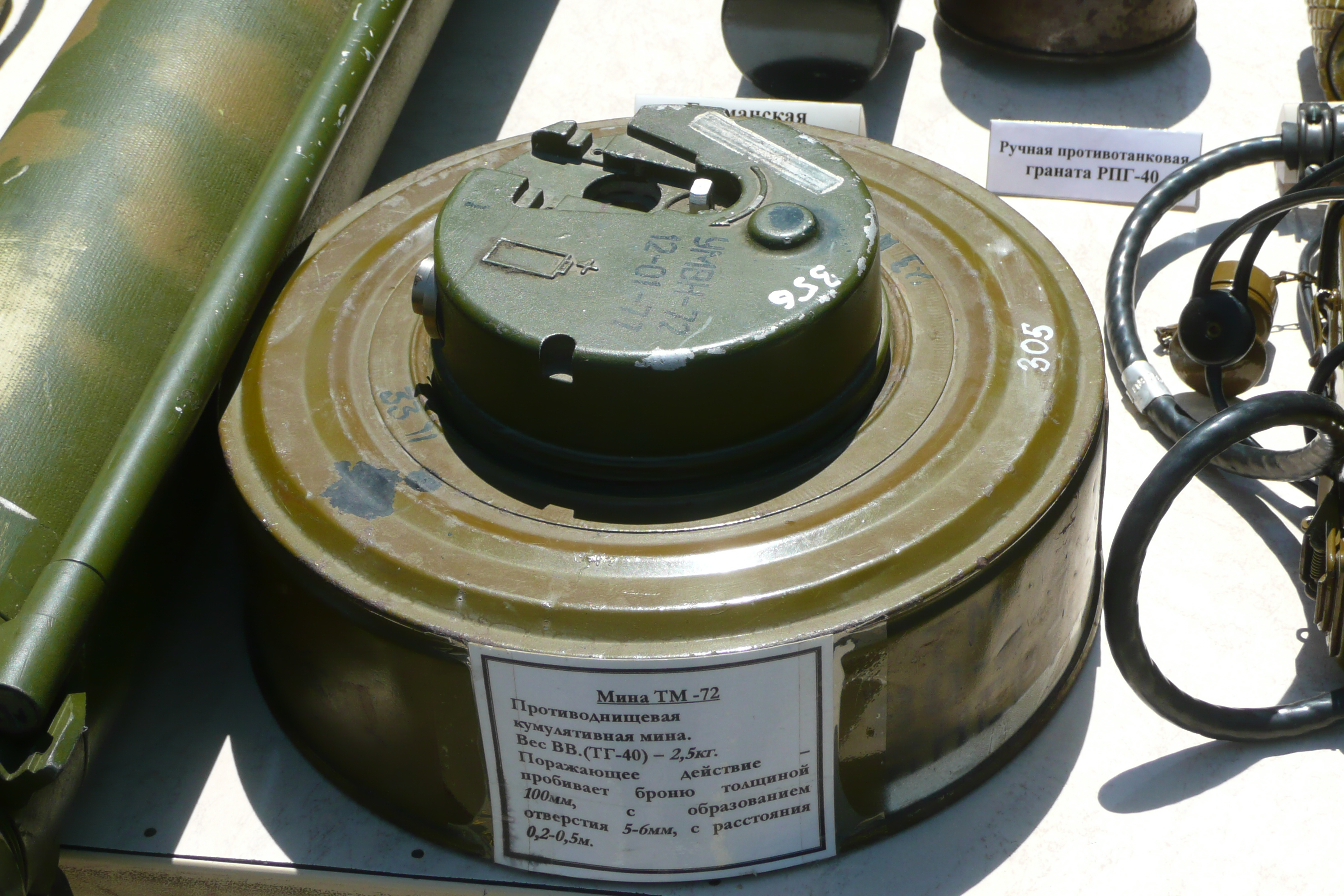
- Type: Shaped charge anti-tank mine
- Place of origin: Soviet Union

Service history
- Used by: Russia; Syria
- Wars: Soviet–Afghan War; Syrian civil war

Specifications
- Mass: 6 kg
- Height: 80 mm
- Diameter: 250 mm
- Filling: TNT/RDX mix
- Filling weight: 2.5 kg
- Detonation mechanism: various typically MVN-72, MVN-80 magnetic influence fuzes

The TM-72 is a Soviet cylindrical metal-cased anti-tank mine. It is normally used with the MVN-72 or MVN-80 magnetic influence fuzes, which give it a full-width attack capability. It uses a 2.5 kg shaped charge warhead capable of penetrating approximately 100 millimeters of armor at a standoff distance of between 0.25 and 0.5 meters. It is compatible with the fuzes used with the TM-62 series of mines.
