= Smârdan-class river monitor =

Class of armored patrol boats

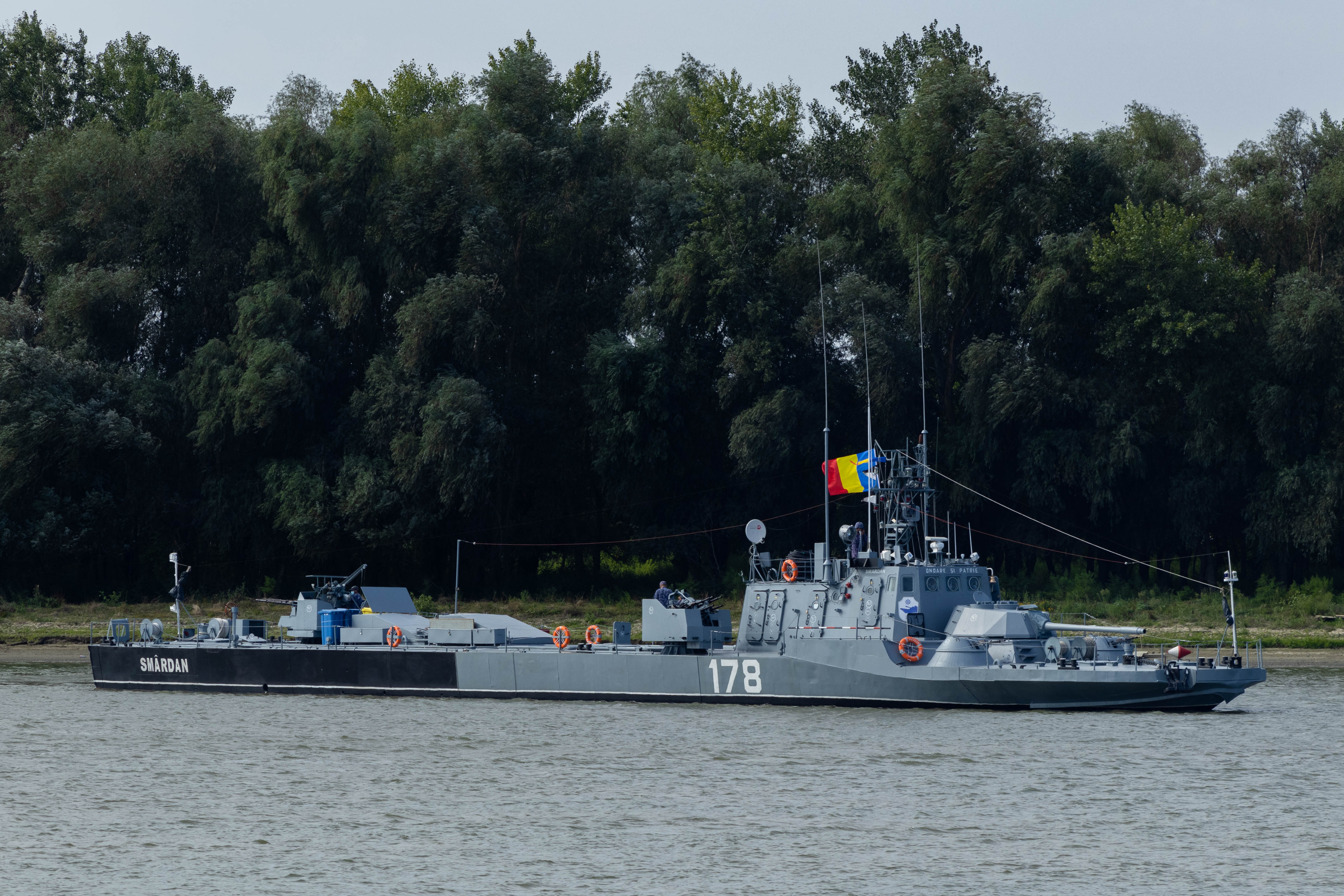
- Smârdan (VBF 178) during the Riverine 2020 exercise

Class overview
- Operators: Romanian Naval Forces
- Preceded by: Brutar I/Grivița - class river monitor
- Succeeded by: Mihail Kogălniceanu-class river monitor
- In commission: 1988-present
- Completed: 5
- Active: 5

General characteristics
- Displacement: 322 t (317 long tons)
- Length: 44.5 m (146 ft 0 in)
- Beam: 8.0 m (26 ft 3 in)
- Draught: 1.30 m (4 ft 3 in)
- Installed power: 2 × Volvo Penta diesel generators
- Propulsion: 3 shaft, 3 × Doosan 4V222TIL diesel engines, 3,600 hp (2,700 kW)
- Speed: 22 knots (41 km/h)
- Range: 500 km (310 mi)
- Complement: 44
- Sensors & processing systems: Koden navigation radar; Sonar; Laser rangefinders, thermal imaging systems
- Armament: 1 × A 430 100 mm (3.9 in) gun; 1 × Twin 30 mm gun; 2 × Quad MR-4N 14.5 mm machine guns; 2 × Twin (14.5mm+7.62mm) machine guns; 2 × 40 × 122 mm MRL; Strela 2M MANPAD

The Smârdan-class river monitor (NATO codification: Brutar II-class) is a class of riverine armored patrol boats (Vedete Blindate Fluviale) in service with the Romanian Naval Forces. Five ships of this class are currently in service with the Romanian Navy. They are assigned to Section II, 67th Artillery Carrying Ships Division "Commander Virgil Alexandru Dragalina" of the Romanian Danube Flotilla based in Brăila.

== Specifications ==
The ships were built at the Mangalia shipyard following testing done on the Grivița-class (Brutar-I). The ships have a displacement of 322 t (317 long tons) with a hull length of 44.5 m (146 ft 0 in), beam of 8.0 m (26 ft 3 in) and draught of 1.30 m (4 ft 3 in). The ships are crewed by 44 seamen and have a range of 500 km (310 mi) with a 5-day autonomy. Armament consists of one 100mm A430 gun (naval version of the 100 mm anti-tank gun M1977), two 122mm APRN multiple rocket launchers with 40 rockets each, one twin 30mm gun, two MR-4N 14.5mm machine guns and two TAB-77 turrets (14.5mm+7.62mm machine guns). For anti-aircraft defense, the ships carry locally produced Strela 2M MANPADS.

After the modernization carried out at the Brăila shipyard between 2018 and 2019, the old engines were replaced with three 1,200 hp (890 kW) Doosan 4V222TIL diesel engines and two Volvo Penta diesel generators were also mounted, increasing the maximum speed of the Smârdan from 17 knots (31 km/h) to 22 knots (41 km/h). Other upgrades included modern laser rangefinders, thermal imaging systems, sonars and Koden navigation radars.

== Ships ==
- Rahova (VBF 176). Commissioned 14 April 1988
- Opanez (VBF 177). Commissioned 24 July 1990
- Smârdan (VBF 178). Commissioned 24 July 1990
- Posada (VBF 179). Commissioned 14 May 1992
- Rovine (VBF 180). Commissioned 30 July 1993

== Service ==
In 2018, Rovine (VBF 180) participated in the Riverine-2018 joint Ukrainian-Romanian exercises on the Danube. While returning to base after exercise Danube Protector in 2019, Smârdan (VBF 178) aided the barge pusher SIDEX 2 in extinguishing an onboard fire which had broken out while towing six barges near Gropeni.

== See also ==
- Mihail Kogălniceanu-class river monitor
- Vosh-class river patrol craft
- Ogonek-class river patrol craft

== Bibliography ==
- Saunders, Stephen, ed. (2004). Jane's Fighting Ships 2004–2005. Coulsdon, UK: Jane's Information Group. ISBN 0-7106-2623-1.
