= Mihail Kogălniceanu-class river monitor =

1993 class of Romanian Navy river monitors

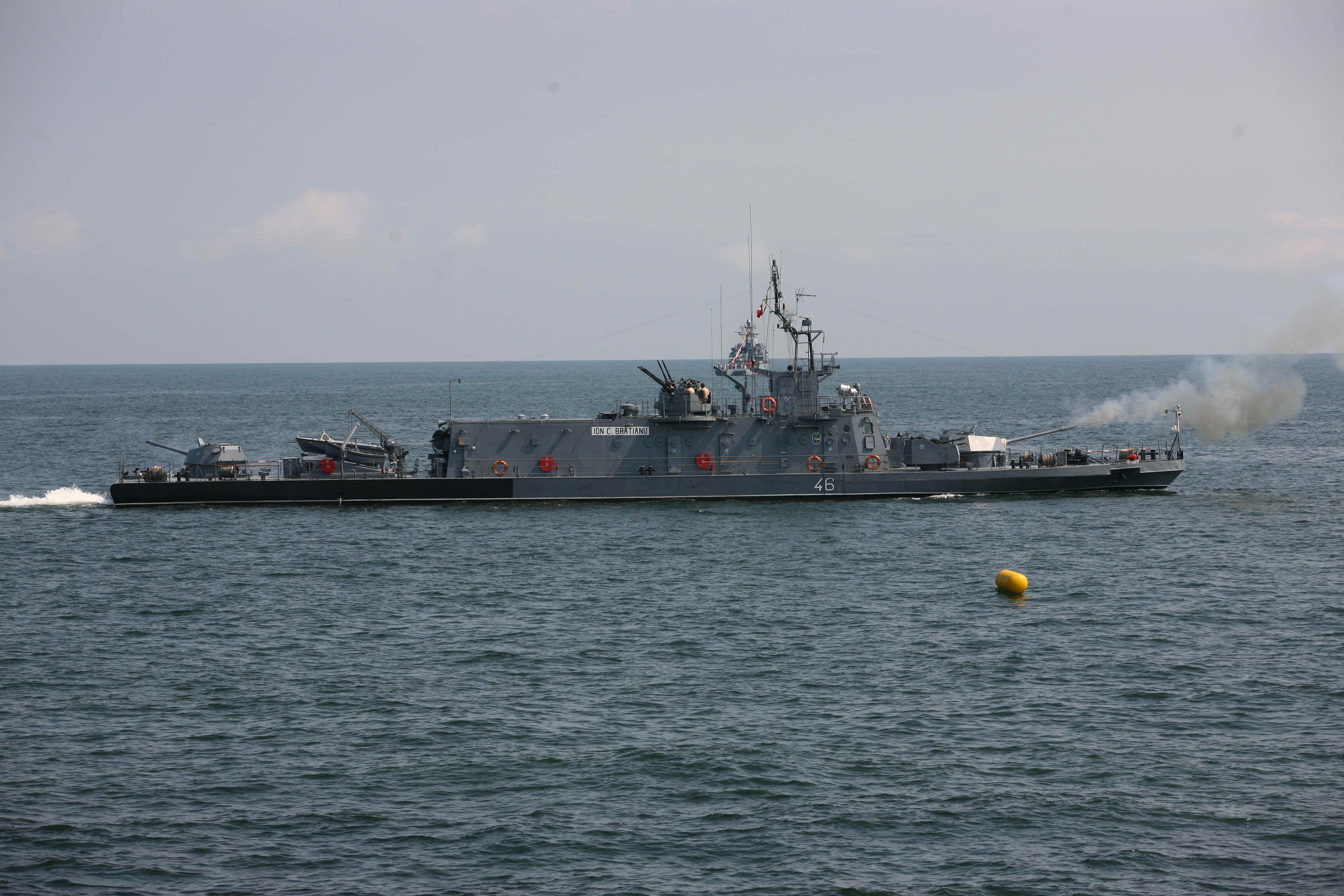
- Ion C. Brătianu (M46) firing during a Navy Day demonstration

Class overview
- Name: Mihail Kogălniceanu-class
- Operators: Romanian Naval Forces
- Preceded by: Smârdan-class river monitor
- In commission: 1993–present
- Planned: 3
- Completed: 3
- Active: 3

General characteristics
- Type: River monitor
- Displacement: Standard: 522 t (514 long tons); Full load: 550 t (540 long tons)
- Length: 52.1 m (170 ft 11 in)
- Beam: 9 m (29 ft 6 in)
- Draught: 1.72 m (5 ft 8 in)
- Propulsion: 2 shaft, 2 × Cummins QSK-50 diesel engines, 4,400 hp (3,300 kW)
- Speed: 16 knots (30 km/h)
- Complement: 51-58
- Armament: 2 × A 430 100 mm (3.9 in) guns; 2 × Twin 30 mm guns; 2 x Quad 14.5 mm machine guns; 2 × 122 mm MRL; Strela 2M MANPAD

The Mihail Kogălniceanu-class river monitor is a three-ship class of river monitors in service with the Romanian Naval Forces. They are assigned to Section I, 67th Artillery, Carrying Ships Division of the Romanian Danube Flotilla based in Brăila.

== Specifications ==
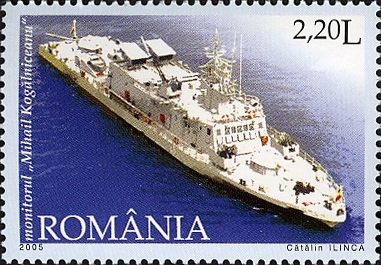
Stamp featuring the Mihail Kogălniceanu with its twin 122mm rocket turrets deployed

The ships were built at the Drobeta-Turnu Severin shipyard. They have a displacement of 550 tons. The length of the hull is 52m, beam 9m, draught 1.72m. Each ship is equipped with two Cummins diesel engines, which drive one shaft and the propeller mounted on it. The ships' main armament consists of two 100mm A430 guns in armored turrets, based on the M1977 anti-tank gun. The ship is also equipped with two 30mm guns, two quad 14.5mm machine guns, and two 40-barreled 122mm rocket launchers. Their anti-aircraft armament consists of CA–94M anti-aircraft missiles, a Romanian licensed version of the Strela–2M.

== Ships ==
- Mihail Kogălniceanu (M45). Launched 1993 – in service.
- Ion C. Brătianu (M46). Launched 1995 – in service.
- Lascăr Catargiu (M47). Launched 1998 – in service.

== Service ==
In 2018, one ship of the class, Lascăr Catargiu (M47), took part in the first joint Ukrainian-Romanian exercises on the Danube, called Riverine-2018, which practiced joint actions of multinational boat tactical groups to increase their interoperability and capabilities for conducting security operations on the Danube River.

== See also ==
- Smârdan-class river monitor
- Yaz-class river gunboat
- Brazilian monitor Parnaíba
