= Romanian Naval Forces =

- Forțele Navale Române
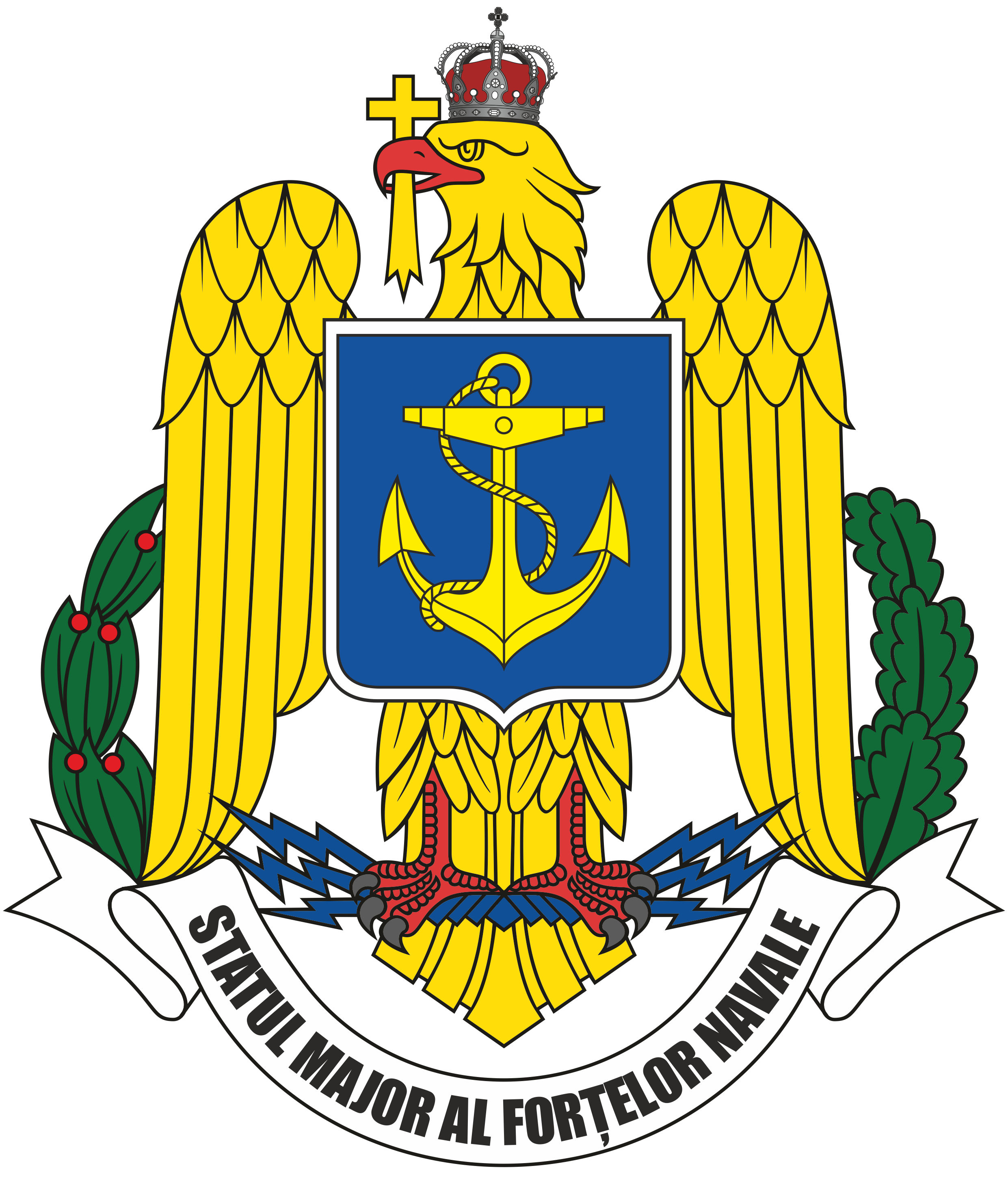
- Romanian Naval Forces coat of arms
- Founded: 22 October 1860 as the Flotilla Corps
- Country: Romania
- Role: Naval warfare, Amphibious warfare, Mine warfare
- Size: 8,000 personnel
- Part of: Romanian Armed Forces
- Command HQ: Statul Major al Forțelor Navale – Bucharest
- Engagements: Romanian War of Independence; Second Balkan War; World War I; World War II; 2011 military intervention in Libya

Commanders
- Commander of the Navy: Vice Admiral Mihai Panait

Insignia
- Roundel

- Military colors

- Naval jack

- Identification flag (obverse)

- Pennant

The Romanian Naval Forces (Romanian: Forțele Navale Române) is the principal naval branch of the Romanian Armed Forces and operates in the Black Sea and on the Danube. It traces its history back to 1860.

== History ==
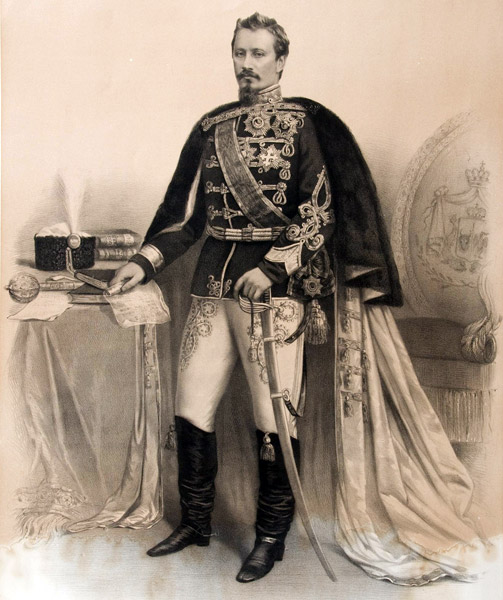
Alexandru Ioan Cuza, the founder of the Romanian Navy

The Romanian Navy was founded in 1860 as a river flotilla on the Danube. After the unification of Wallachia and Moldavia, Alexandru Ioan Cuza, the ruling Domnitor of the Romanian Principalities, decided on 22 October 1860 by order no. 173 to unify the navies into a single flotilla, the Danube Flotilla Corps. The navy was French-trained and organized. Officers were initially sent to Brest Naval Training Centre in France, as the Military School in Bucharest did not have a naval section. The first Commander-in-chief of the navy was Colonel Nicolae Steriade. The base was first established in 1861 at Izmail, but it was later relocated in 1864 to Brăila and in 1867 to Galați. The equipment was modest at best, with 3 ships from Wallachia and 3 from Moldavia, manned by 275 sailors. The main goal of the navy was to organize, train and expand this small force.

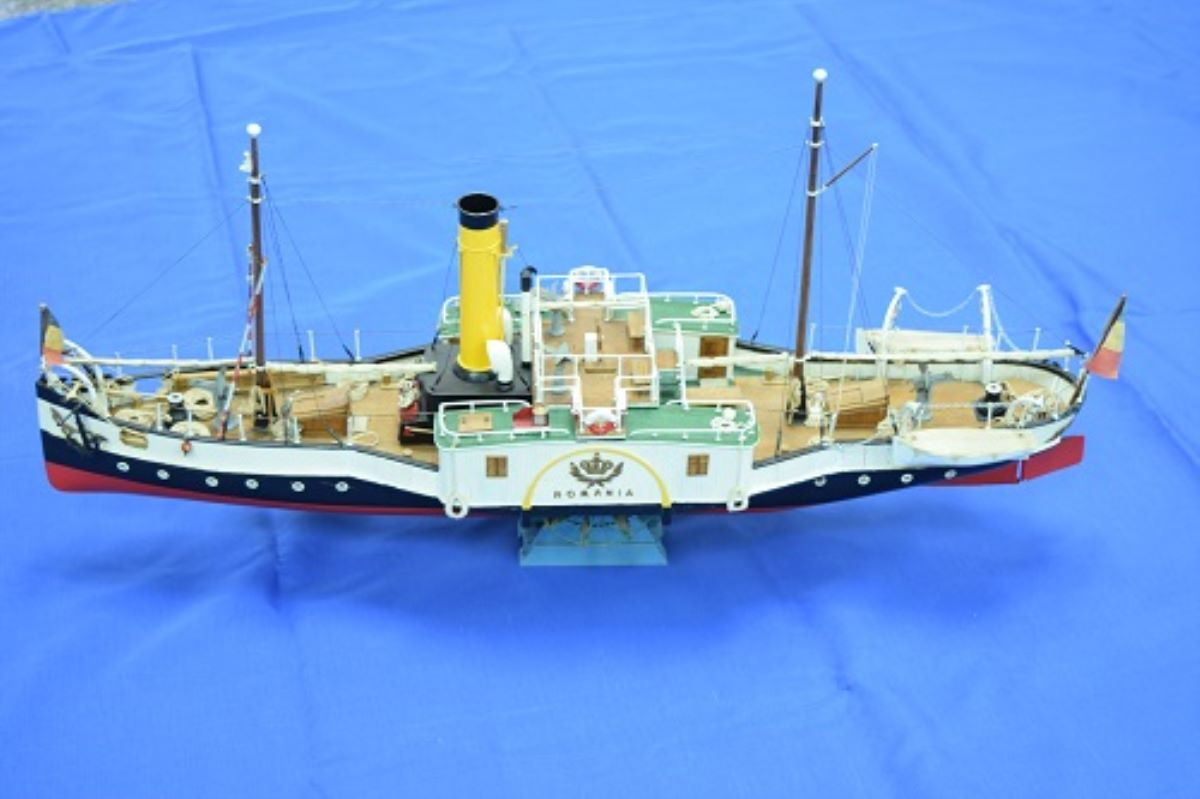
Model of the paddle ship România

The first seamen's training school was established in 1872 at Galați for officers, petty officers and sailors. The first acquisition of the Romanian Navy was the paddle steamboat "Prințul Nicolae Conache Vogoride". The ship was purchased in 1861 and was later transformed into a warship at Meyer naval shipyard in Linz, being christened "România" when it was launched at Galați harbor. In 1867, the royal yacht "Ștefan cel Mare" (Stephen the Great) entered service. In October 1873, the Fulgerul gunboat, ordered by the Romanian state as the first purpose-built warship in the history of the Romanian Navy, was finished at the Toulon shipyard in France. However, the ship was unarmed, so she would be allowed passage through the Turkish straits. After arriving in Romania in April 1874, she was fitted with a Krupp cannon in a mild steel turret at the Galați shipyard. The next ship to enter service with the Romanian Navy was the spar torpedo boat NMS Rândunica in 1875. These ships represented the Romanian Flotilla during the War of Independence.

=== Romanian Navy during the War of Independence ===
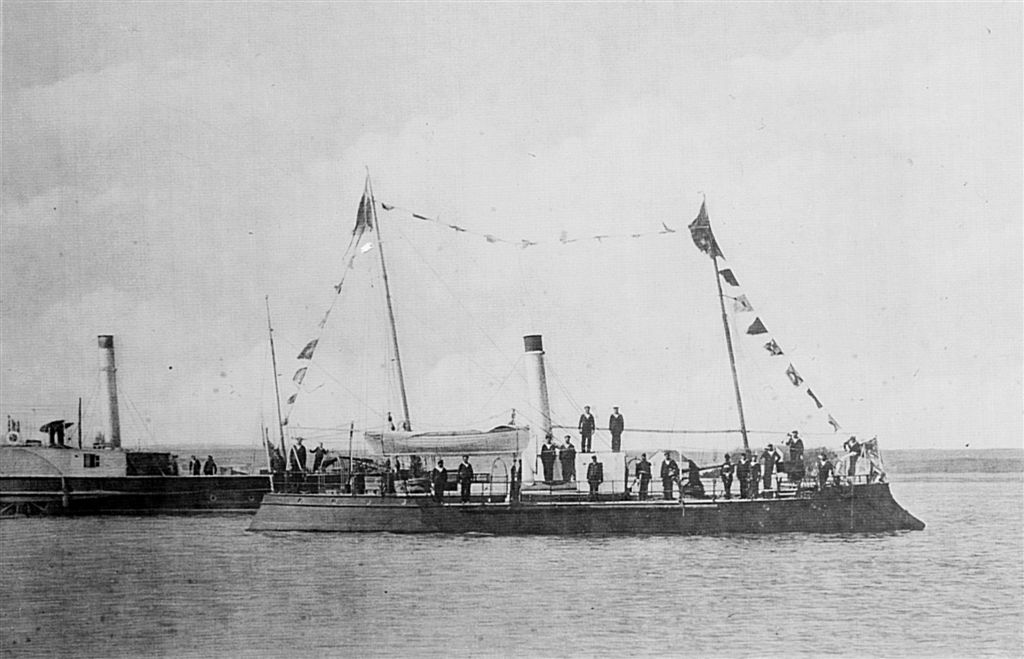
"Fulgerul" (The Lightning) gunboat, built in 1873 at Toulon and armed in the following year at Galați, was the first military ship to have sailed under Romanian flag in maritime waters.

During the War of Independence, the name used in Romanian historiography to refer to the 1877–1878 Russo-Turkish war, the Romanian Navy sailed under the Russian flag. The main task of the Romanian Flotilla Corps was to transport Russian troops, equipment and supplies across the Danube and to protect the bridges across the river by using mine barrages in key points. The main success of the war was the sinking of the Turkish river monitor "Seyfî" near Măcin by a group of spar torpedo boats including "Rândunica" and the Russian Carevitch and Ksenya crafts. Another notable success was the sinking of the Turkish river monitor "Podgoriçe" (Podgorica) by the Romanian coastal artillery on 7 November 1877.

After the war, the navy transported the Romanian troops back across the Danube. The small but successful navy had demonstrated the need for a strong Danube flotilla in order to secure the southern border of Romania. Three rearmament plans were implemented: during 1883–1885, 1886–1888 and 1906–1908. These plans mainly concentrated on the Danube flotilla. In 1896, the "Flotilla Corps", as it was known until then, was organized in two sections: the Danube Division and the Sea Division. The riverine base was at Galați, while the maritime base was at Constanța, which was by then part of Romania.

=== Creation of the Romanian Black Sea Fleet ===
The Romanian Black Sea Fleet was founded in the summer of 1890, 10 years after Romania acquired its first sea-going warship: the gunboat NMS Grivița. The newly created division consisted of the small protected cruiser NMS Elisabeta, the training ship NMS Mircea, the three Smeul-class torpedo boats, and the forementioned Grivița.

=== Involvement in the Potemkin mutiny ===
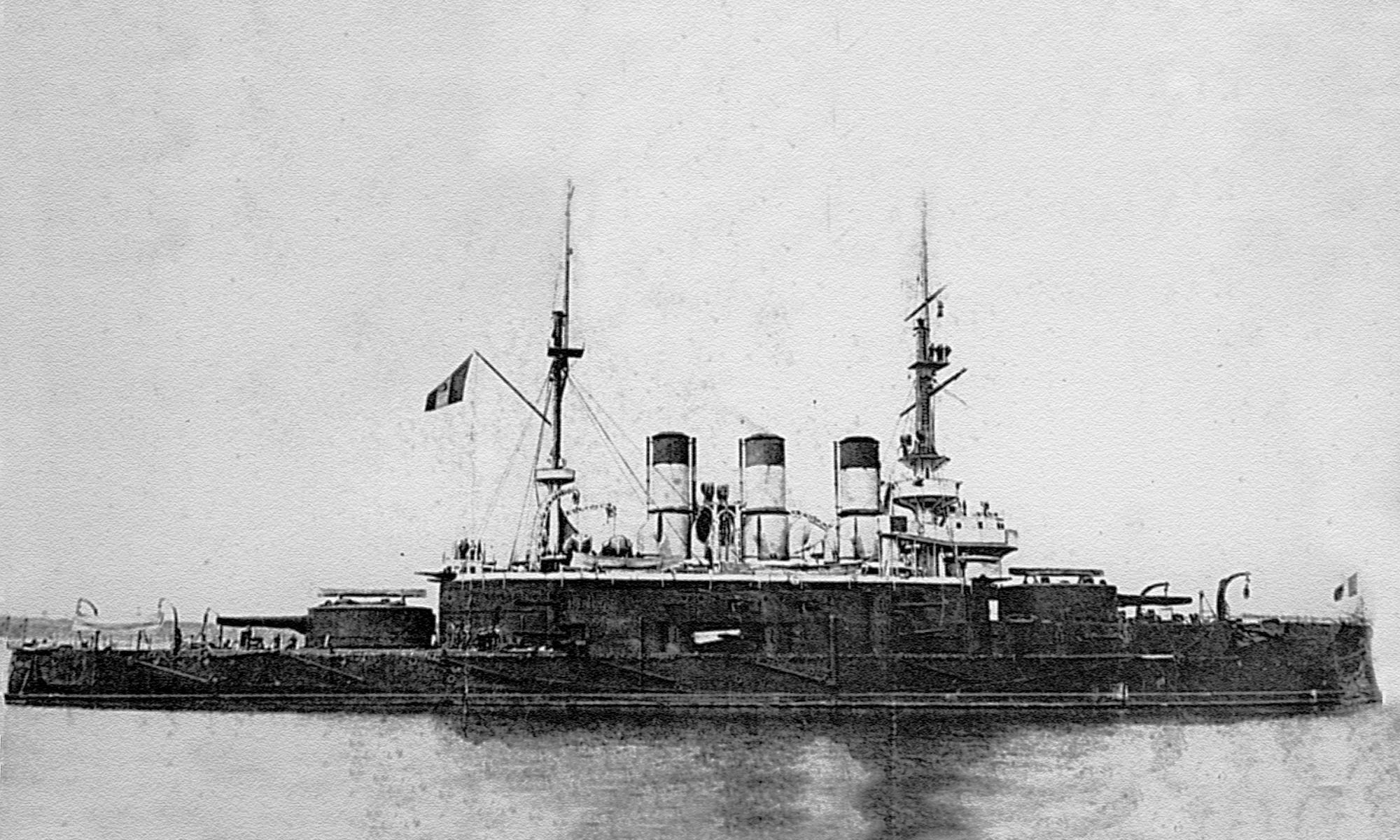
Potemkin at anchor with the Romanian flag hoisted on her mast, Constanța, July 1905

On 2 July 1905, during the mutiny of the Russian battleship Potemkin, the Romanian protected cruiser NMS Elisabeta engaged the Russian torpedo boat Ismail as the latter was trying to sneak into the Romanian port of Constanța. Elisabeta fired two warning shots, first a blank charge then an explosive charge, forcing the torpedo boat to retreat. Later that day, Potemkin and Ismail left Romanian waters. During the night of 7 July, however, Potemkin returned to the Romanian port, this time agreeing to surrender to the Romanian authorities in exchange for the latter giving asylum to the crew. On the noon of 8 July, Captain Negru, the commander of the port, came aboard the Potemkin and hoisted the Romanian flag before allowing the warship to enter the inner harbor. On 10 July, after negotiations with the Romanian Government, Potemkin was handed over to Imperial Russian authorities and taken to Sevastopol.

=== Romanian Navy during World War I ===
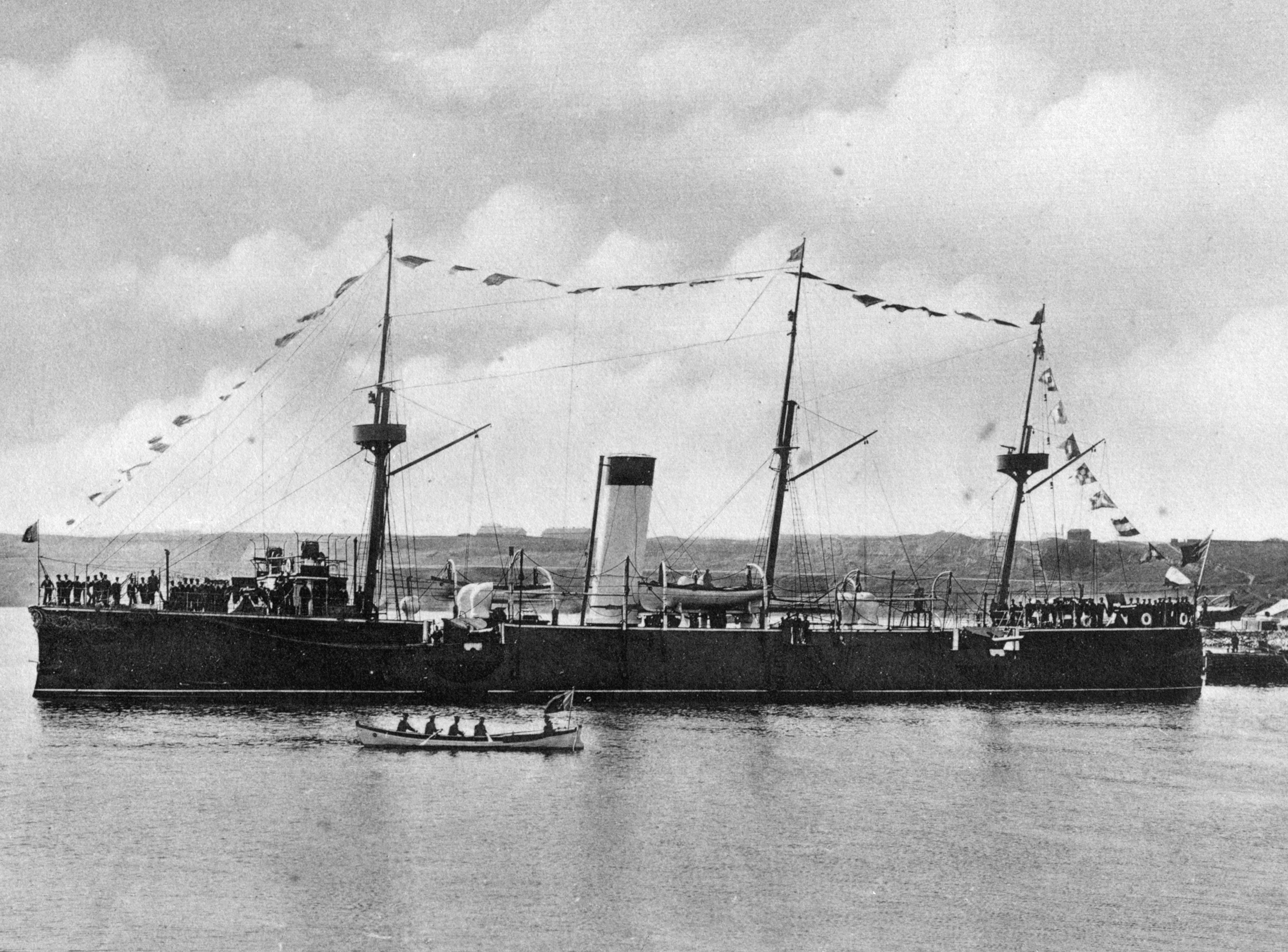
The protected cruiser Elisabeta (Elizabeth), built in 1888 by Armstrong

After the War of Independence, two naval rearmament programs were proposed for the Black Sea flotilla. The 1899 program called for six coastal battleships, four destroyers and twelve torpedo boats. None of these ships were ever built, while the battleship Potemkin was returned 1 day after being acquired. The 1912 naval program envisioned six 3,500-ton light cruisers, twelve 1,500-ton destroyers and a submarine. Four destroyers (and allegedly a submarine) were actually ordered from Italy but were not delivered, as the Italian Navy requisitioned them in 1914. Three 340-ton coastal submarines were ordered from France in early 1917, but these were also requisitioned at the end of the year and completed for the French Navy as the O'Byrne class. The largest Romanian Black Sea ship was the old cruiser Elisabeta, laid down in 1888. The protected cruiser had guarded the mouths of the river Danube during the Second Balkan War, but she was disarmed when World War I began. Her armament was emplaced on the bank of the Danube River to protect against possible attacks by Austro-Hungarian river monitors, and she remained in Sulina for the duration of the war. The Romanian Black Sea squadron also had four old gunboats from the 1880s, which were of limited value, and three old Năluca-class torpedo boats, built in France. The Romanian Navy had to rely on the armed merchant ships of the state merchant marine, known as SMR (Serviciul Maritim Român). The steam liners Regele Carol I, România, Împăratul Traian and Dacia were converted into auxiliary cruisers.

The Danube Flotilla was more modern, and consisted of four river monitors (Lascăr Catargiu, Mihail Kogălniceanu, Ion C. Brătianu and Alexandru Lahovari) and eight British-built torpedo boats. The four river monitors were built in 1907 at Galați. They were armed with three 12-cm cannons each. In 1918, Mihail Kogălniceanu was converted to a sea-going monitor. The British torpedo boats of the Căpitan Nicolae Lascăr Bogdan class were built during 1906–1907 and weighed 50 tons each. There were also approximately six older gunboats used for border patrol and as minelayers, and other auxiliary ships used for transport or supply. The Romanian Navy had a secondary role during World War I and only had light losses. The river monitors participated in the defense of Turtucaia and later secured the flank of the Romanian and Russian defenders in Dobruja. The main success of the war was the mining of an Austro-Hungarian river monitor.

=== Romanian Navy during the interwar period ===
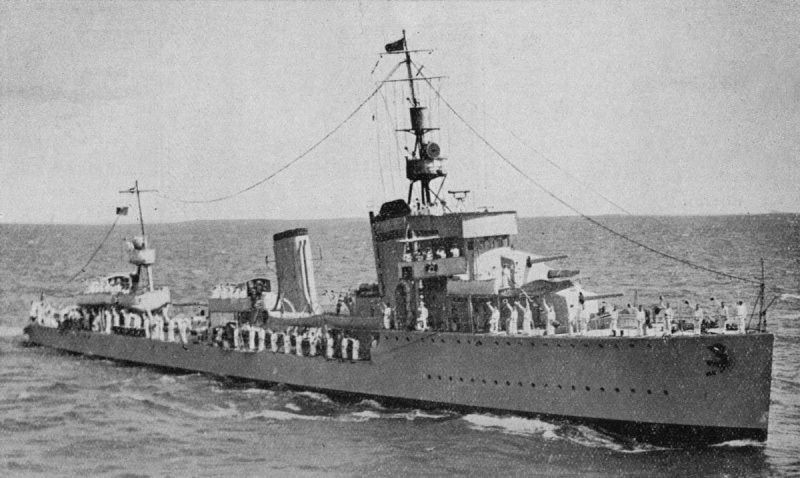
The destroyer Regele Ferdinand in 1935

Following the end of World War I, the Kingdom of Romania took possession of three Austro-Hungarian river monitors (renamed Ardeal, Basarabia, and Bucovina after the newly incorporated territories), and in 1921 purchased four Italian patrol boats. These ships, together with the ones already in service, made Romania's Danube flotilla the most powerful riverine fleet in the world until World War II.

The main focus of the Romanian Navy during the interwar period was the Black Sea fleet. In 1920, two of the initial four Aquila-class scout cruisers (officially designated as destroyers) ordered from Italy were received. These were renamed Mărășești and Mărăști. Four gunboats were purchased from the French Navy: Stihi, Dumitrescu, Lepri, and Sublocotenent Ghiculescu. Another gunboat of the same class was bought for spares. Seven torpedo boats were received as war reparations from Austria-Hungary. The torpedo boat Fulgerul however was lost during the trip to Romania when she capsized and sank in the Bosphorus in 1922. Năluca, Sborul, and Smeul, three of these old torpedo boats, will later see service in World War II. In 1926, two additional destroyers were ordered from Italy: Regele Ferdinand and Regina Maria of the Regele Ferdinand class, together with the Romanian Navy's first submarine, Delfinul, and the submarine tender Constanța. These ships were commissioned between 1930 and 1936.

The expansion of the Romanian Navy during the interwar period required more training facilities and ships. The first step towards this issue was taken in 1920, when a naval college was founded at Constanța. In 1938, the sail ship Mircea was built in Hamburg by the Blohm & Voss shipyard as a training vessel for the Romanian Navy. The SMR (Serviciul Maritim Român, the Romanian state merchant marine) was also endowed with a number of new ships: the steamer Oituz, the ex-German freighters Ardeal, Peleș, Alba Iulia, and Suceava (all of them commissioned between 1932 and 1933), the passenger liners Basarabia and Transilvania (bought from Germany in 1938) and four new freighters from Italy just before the start of the Second World War: Balcic, Cavarna, Mangalia, and Sulina. In 1940, the SMR had 17 merchant ships with a total of over 72,000 tons of shipping.

=== The 1937 naval program and subsequent developments ===
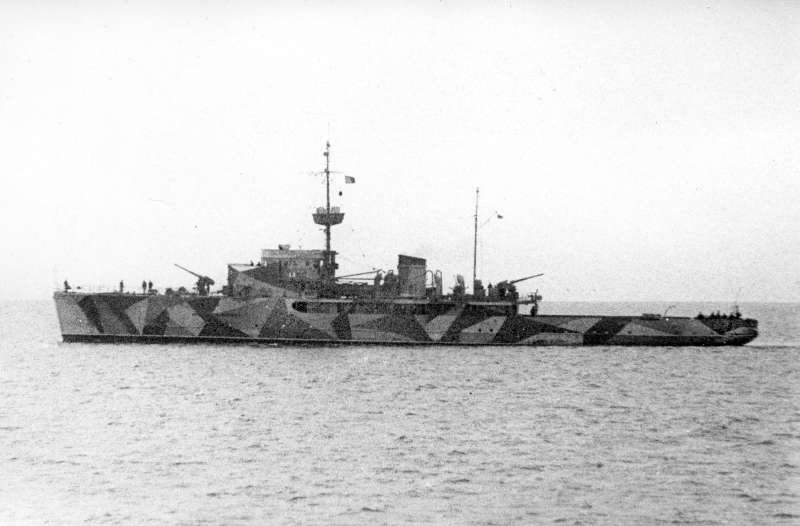
Anti-aircraft escort minelayer Amiral Murgescu, the largest Romanian-built warship of World War II

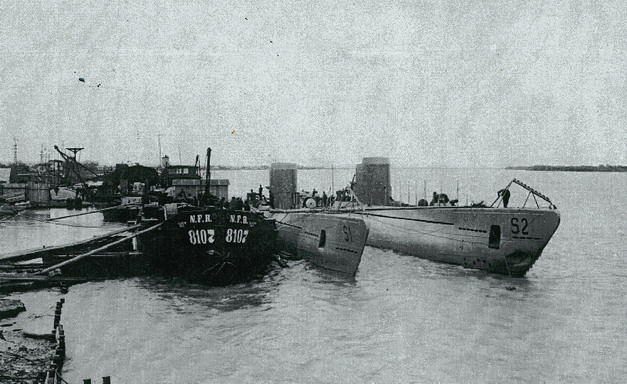
Submarines Rechinul (left) and Marsuinul (right)

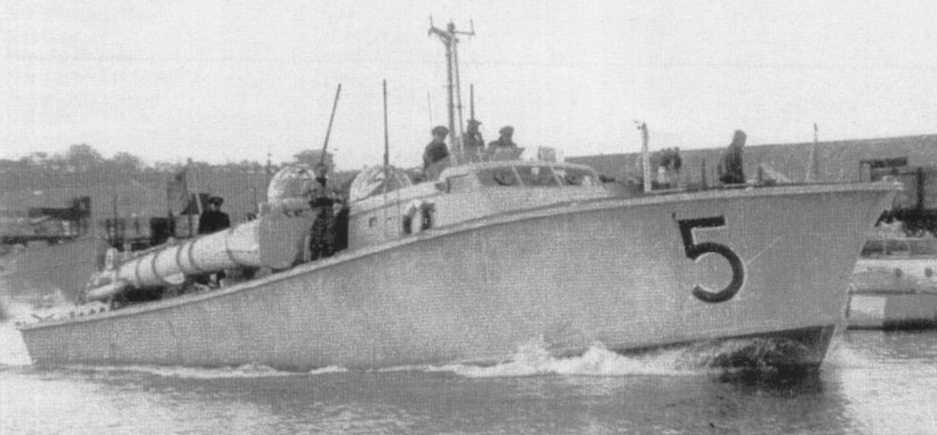
Vedenia-class MTB Vântul

In 1937, a new rearmament program was proposed. The new plan envisioned a cruiser, four small destroyers, three submarines, two minelayers and ten motor torpedo boats. These warships were to be built locally at the Galați shipyard, where a new dry dock was developed.

The anti-aircraft escort minelayer Amiral Murgescu was laid down at the Galați shipyard in August 1938, launched in June 1939 and commissioned during the first half of 1941. She replaced the planned cruiser as the largest warship yielded by the 1937 program. She was employed in minelaying operations as well as convoy escort missions. Her main armament consisted of 10.5 cm SK C/32 naval guns, much like the German anti-aircraft cruisers Arcona and Niobe. Her sister ship, Cetatea Albă, was laid down in 1939, but abandoned at an early stage. Her construction was transferred to Germany and in 1940 she was completed by the Blohm & Voss shipyard in Hamburg. Cetatea Albă had the same standard displacement and top speed as her sister. It is not known, however, if her armament consisted of more than two 102 mm dual-purpose main guns, two 37 mm anti-aircraft guns and 135 mines. Cetatea Albă was likely never commissioned.

The four planned destroyers were replaced by four German M-class minesweepers. These were built locally from German materials in 1943. They were 500-ton vessels armed each with two 88 mm main guns, five anti-aircraft guns (two 37 mm and three 20 mm) and two depth-charge throwers.

Two of the three planned submarines were laid down at the Galați shipyard in 1938, launched in May 1941 and commissioned in May 1943. The first one was Marsuinul, a 620-ton attack submarine armed with one 105 mm deck gun, one 37 mm anti-aircraft gun and six 533 mm torpedo tubes (4 bow and 2 stern). Her smaller sister ship, Rechinul, was a 585-ton minelaying submarine armed with one 20 mm anti-aircraft gun, four 533 mm torpedo tubes and 40 mines. The third planned submarine was replaced by five Italian CB midget submarines, commissioned in late 1943. The two minelayers were acquired in 1941.

Three of the ten planned motor torpedo boats were built by Vospers in the United Kingdom and acquired in 1940. They were named Viforul, Viscolul, and Vijelia. Six more MTBs, of the Power type, were built locally as the Vedenia class. They were laid down in 1939 and commissioned in 1943. The planned number of MTBs was exceeded in August 1943, when seven Italian MAS were also commissioned. These were followed by four 65-ton German S-boats in August 1944, each armed with two 500 mm torpedo tubes.

| Warships envisioned by the 1937 program | Warships acquired until 23 August 1944 |
|---|---|
| 1 cruiser | 1 minelayer/escort ship |
| 4 destroyers | 4 escort minesweepers (commissioned postwar) |
| 3 submarines | 2 submarines (plus 5 midget submarines) |
| 2 minelayers | 2 minelayers |
| 10 MTBs | 20 MTBs |

=== World War II and postwar ===
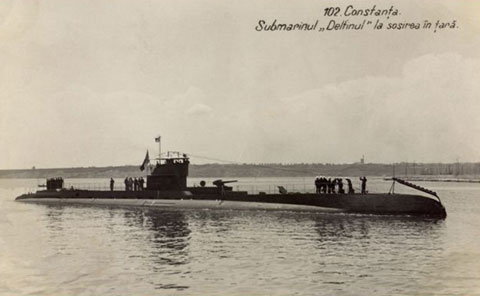
NMS Delfinul, the only Axis submarine in the Black Sea in 1941, acted mainly as a "ship-in-being" due to its obsolescence and sank only one unescorted merchant ship.

In 1941, the Royal Romanian Navy had four destroyers (Mărășești, Mărăști, Regele Ferdinand, and Regina Maria), one submarine (Delfinul), two minelayers (Amiral Murgescu and Cetatea Albă, also employed as a destroyer escorts), three auxiliary minelayers, three motor torpedo boats (Viforul, Vijelia, and Viscolul), three gunboats, fifteen small auxiliary vessels and twenty seaplanes. Mărăști had a cracked shaft and could not exceed the speed of 24 knots. As a result, Mărăști never ventured far from the coast. Delfinul, the only Axis submarine present in the Black Sea in 1941, was obsolete and mechanically unreliable. By comparison, the Soviet Black Sea Fleet had a battleship, three medium cruisers, three light cruisers, three flotilla leaders, eight modern destroyers, five old destroyers, two large torpedo boats, 47 submarines and many other auxiliary and small vessels. The overwhelming superiority of the Soviet Navy forced the Royal Romanian Navy to conduct mainly defensive operations throughout the entire war and its warships rarely hazarded further east than Cape Sarych.

The two Regele Ferdinand-class destroyers were the most powerful surface units available to the Axis powers during the naval war in the Black Sea but were mostly used for convoy escort. The Romanian-built minelayer/destroyer escort Amiral Murgescu and the three auxiliary minelayers of the Romanian Navy played an important role in the defence of Constanța in 1941 and later in securing the merchant convoy routes to the Bosphorus and the supply routes to Odessa and Sevastopol. Mines were the main cause of Soviet submarine losses in the Black Sea naval war. Wartime additions to the fleet included 3 KFK naval trawlers and 3 landing craft of the MFP type.

The Royal Romanian Navy was involved in the evacuation of Axis forces from Crimea in 1944. The Romanian naval commander, Rear Admiral Horia Macellariu, was awarded the German Knight's Cross of the Iron Cross after Operation 60,000, the contingency plan for the evacuation of Crimea. Until King Michael's Coup, the Romanian Navy retreated behind the protection of the coastal mine barrages and anti-aircraft defences of Constanța as the Soviet Air Force began to launch heavy air attacks. On the capitulation of Romania in August 1944, the German warships were ordered to leave Romanian harbours. However, when the Soviet minesweeper T-410 Vzryv, accompanied by Amiral Murgescu, was sunk by a German submarine, the Soviet Navy accused the Royal Romanian Navy of betrayal and seized all vessels using this excuse on 5 September 1944. By this late stage of the war, only one destroyer (Regina Maria), one leader (Mărășești), two gunboats (Dumitrescu and Ghiculescu), one minelayer (Amiral Murgescu) and three motor torpedo boats were still operational. The rest of the warships were in repairs after the evacuation of Crimea and the Soviet air attacks of the preceding couple of months or had been relegated to training duties. The Soviet Navy moved all Romanian warships to Caucasian ports. They were not returned until after the war. The older vessels were received in September 1945, while the more modern ones (such as the Regele Ferdinand class) were kept by the Soviet Black Sea Fleet until the early 1950s. A number of warships were never returned.

The largest Romanian warship loss of the entire war was the accidental sinking of the gunboat Lepri. The gunboat ran into a Romanian mine laid by the minelayer Aurora near Sulina in January 1941, when hostilities between the Soviet Union and the Axis had not begun. While the Royal Romanian Navy had light losses throughout the war, the state merchant navy was practically non-existent by late 1944: every ship of the SMR was sunk or damaged by the Soviet Navy and Air Force because of the light Romanian and German forces in the Black Sea that were unable to provide adequate protection.

The following is a list of battles and operations of the World War II Black Sea Campaign involving the Royal Romanian Navy:

- Raid on Constanța
- Operation München
  - Action of 9 July 1941
- Siege of Odessa (1941)
- Crimean Campaign
- Operation Achse
- Crimean Offensive

The Romanian Naval Forces were reorganized during the Soviet occupation of Romania as the Romanian People's Navy. Under the Romanian People's Navy, the ship prefix "Nava Majestăţii Sale" (NMS) designation (or “His/Her Majesty's Ship”) that was given to each ship under the Romanian Royal Navy was abolished.

==== World War II Romanian Black Sea Fleet warships ====
Romanian naval forces in the Black Sea consisted of: four destroyers, four torpedo boats, eight submarines, three minelayers, one submarine tender, three gunboats and one training ship.

| Vessel | Origin | Type | Notes |
Destroyers
| Mărăști | Italy | Destroyer | Built in Italy for the Romanian Navy, entered service in 1920 |
| Mărășești | Italy | Destroyer | Built in Italy for the Romanian Navy, entered service in 1920 |
| Regele Ferdinand | Italy | Destroyer | Built in Italy for the Romanian Navy, entered service in 1930 |
| Regina Maria | Italy | Destroyer | Built in Italy for the Romanian Navy, entered service in 1930 |
Torpedo boats
| Sborul | Austria-Hungary | Torpedo boat | Built in Austria-Hungary, during World War I |
| Viscolul | United Kingdom | Motor torpedo boat | Built in the United Kingdom, acquired in 1940 |
| Viforul | United Kingdom | Motor torpedo boat | Built in the United Kingdom, acquired in 1940 |
| Vijelia | United Kingdom | Motor torpedo boat | Built in the United Kingdom, acquired in 1940 |
Minelayers
| Regele Carol I | United Kingdom | Minelayer/Seaplane tender | Built in the United Kingdom in 1898 |
| Amiral Murgescu | Romania | Minelayer/Escort ship | Built at the Galați shipyard in Romania between 1938 and 1941 |
| Remus Lepri | France | Minelayer/Gunboat | Built in France, during the second half of World War I |
Submarine tenders
| Constanța | Italy | Submarine tender | Built in Italy for the Romanian Navy between 1927 and 1931 |
Gunboats
| Sublocotenent Ghiculescu | France | Gunboat | Built in France during the second half of World War I |
| Eugen Stihi | France | Gunboat | Built in France during the second half of World War I |
| Căpitan Dumitrescu | France | Gunboat | Built in France during the second half of World War I |
Training ships
| Mircea | Germany | Training ship | Built in Germany for the Romanian Navy in 1938 |
Submarines
| Delfinul | Italy | Submarine | Built in Italy for the Romanian Navy, entered service in 1936 |
| Rechinul | Romania | Submarine | Built at the Galați shipyard in Romania between 1938 and 1943 |
| Marsuinul | Romania | Submarine | Built at the Galați shipyard in Romania between 1938 and 1943 |
| CB-1 | Italy | Midget submarine | Acquired in late 1943, after the Italian surrender |
| CB-2 | Italy | Midget submarine | Acquired in late 1943, after the Italian surrender |
| CB-3 | Italy | Midget submarine | Acquired in late 1943, after the Italian surrender |
| CB-4 | Italy | Midget submarine | Acquired in late 1943, after the Italian surrender |
| CB-6 | Italy | Midget submarine | Acquired in late 1943, after the Italian surrender |

==== List of enemy warships sunk by the Royal Romanian Navy during World War II ====
| Vessel | Navy | Notes |
Destroyers
| Moskva | Soviet Navy | The Soviet Leningrad-class destroyer was sunk on 26 June 1941 during the Raid on Constanța by Romanian mines, laid by the Romanian minelayers Amiral Murgescu, Regele Carol I and Aurora |
Submarines
| Shch-206 | Soviet Navy | The Soviet Shchuka-class submarine was sunk with depth charges near Mangalia by the Romanian torpedo boat Năluca and motor torpedo boats Viforul and Vijelia on 9 July 1941 |
| M-58 | Soviet Navy | The Soviet M-class submarine was sunk near Constanța on 18 October 1941 by Romanian mines, laid by the Romanian minelayers Amiral Murgescu, Regele Carol I and Aurora |
| M-34 | Soviet Navy | The Soviet M-class submarine was sunk near Constanța on 30 October 1941 by Romanian mines, laid by the Romanian minelayers Amiral Murgescu, Regele Carol I, and Aurora |
| S-34 | Soviet Navy | The Soviet S-class submarine was sunk near Cape Emine on 12 November 1941 by Romanian mines, laid by the Romanian minelayers Amiral Murgescu, Regele Carol I, and Dacia |
| Shch-211 | Soviet Navy | The Soviet Shchuka-class submarine was sunk near Varna on 16 November 1941 by Romanian mines, laid by the Romanian minelayers Amiral Murgescu, Regele Carol I, and Dacia |
| M-59 | Soviet Navy | The Soviet M-class submarine was sunk with depth charges near Jibrieni by the Romanian destroyer Regele Ferdinand on 17 December 1941 |
| Shch-210 | Soviet Navy | The Soviet Shchuka-class submarine was sunk near Shabla on 12 or 15 March 1942 by Romanian mines, laid by the Romanian minelayers Amiral Murgescu, Regele Carol I, and Dacia |
| M-33 | Soviet Navy | The Soviet M-class submarine was sunk near Odessa on 24 August 1942 by Romanian mines, laid by the Romanian minelayers Amiral Murgescu and Dacia |
| Shch-208 | Soviet Navy | The Soviet Shchuka-class submarine was sunk near Constanța on 26 August 1942 by Romanian mines, laid by the Romanian minelayers Amiral Murgescu, Regele Carol I, and Aurora |
| M-60 | Soviet Navy | The Soviet M-class submarine was sunk near Odessa on 26 September 1942 by Romanian mines, laid by the Romanian minelayers Amiral Murgescu and Dacia |
| M-118 | Soviet Navy | The Soviet M-class submarine was sunk with depth charges near Cape Burnas by the Romanian gunboats Ghiculescu and Stihi on 1 October 1942 |
| Shch-213 | Soviet Navy | The Soviet Shchuka-class submarine was sunk near Constanța on 14 October 1942 by Romanian mines, laid by the Romanian minelayers Amiral Murgescu, Regele Carol I and Aurora |
| Shch-212 | Soviet Navy | The Soviet Shchuka-class submarine was sunk near the island of Fidonisi on 11 December 1942 by Romanian mines, laid by the Romanian minelayers Amiral Murgescu and Dacia |
| L-24 | Soviet Navy | The Soviet Leninets-class submarine was sunk near Shabla on 15 December 1942 by Romanian mines, laid by the Romanian minelayers Amiral Murgescu, Regele Carol I and Dacia |
| M-31 | Soviet Navy | The Soviet M-class submarine was either sunk by Romanian mines near Fidonisi on 17 December 1942 or sunk with depth charges by the Romanian flotilla leader Mărășești on 7 July 1943 |
| L-6 | Soviet Navy | The Soviet Leninets-class submarine was sunk with depth charges between Constanța and Sevastopol by the Romanian gunboat Ghiculescu supported by the German submarine chaser UJ-104 on 18 or 21 April 1944 |

== Command, control and organisation ==
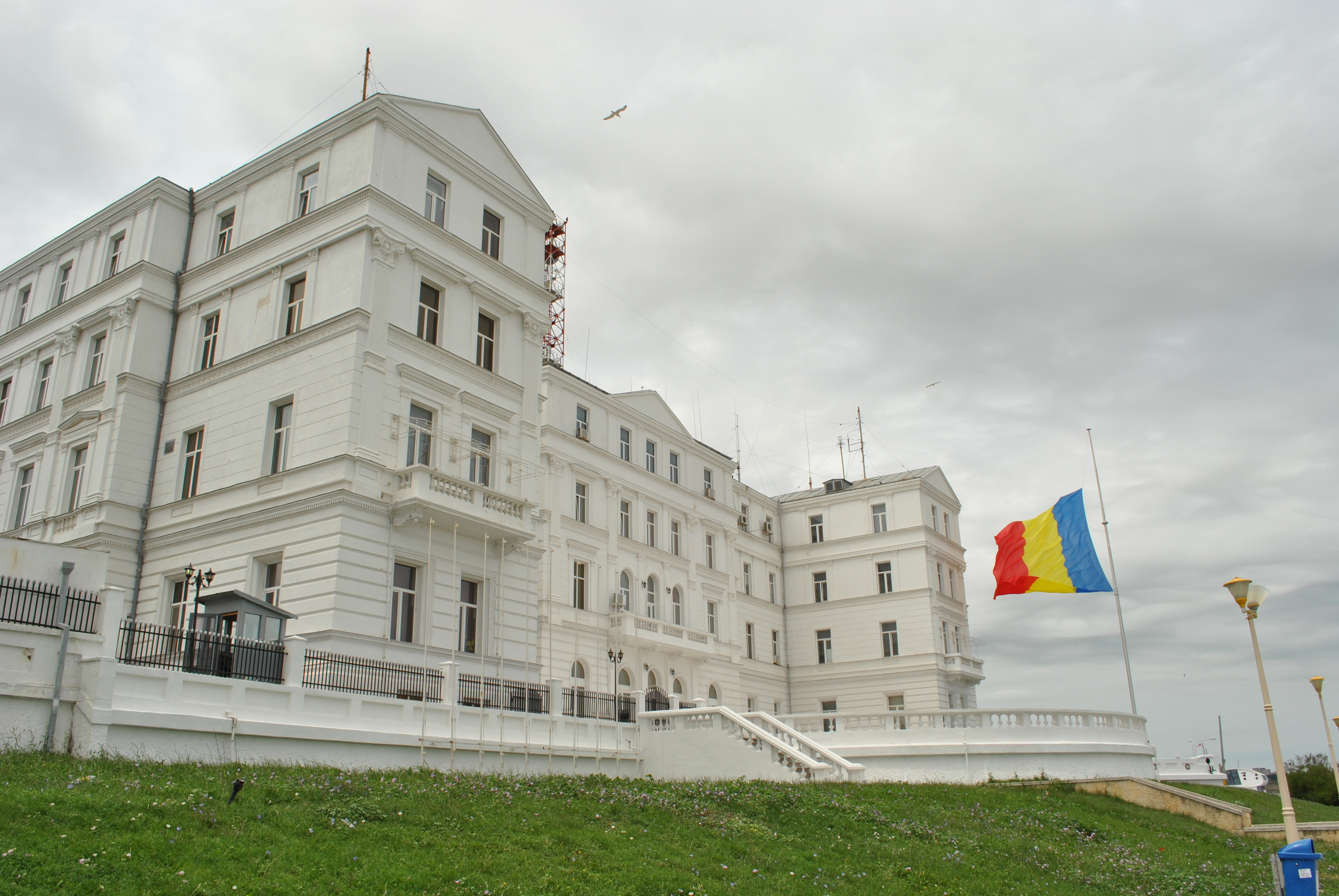
The Fleet Command building in Constanța

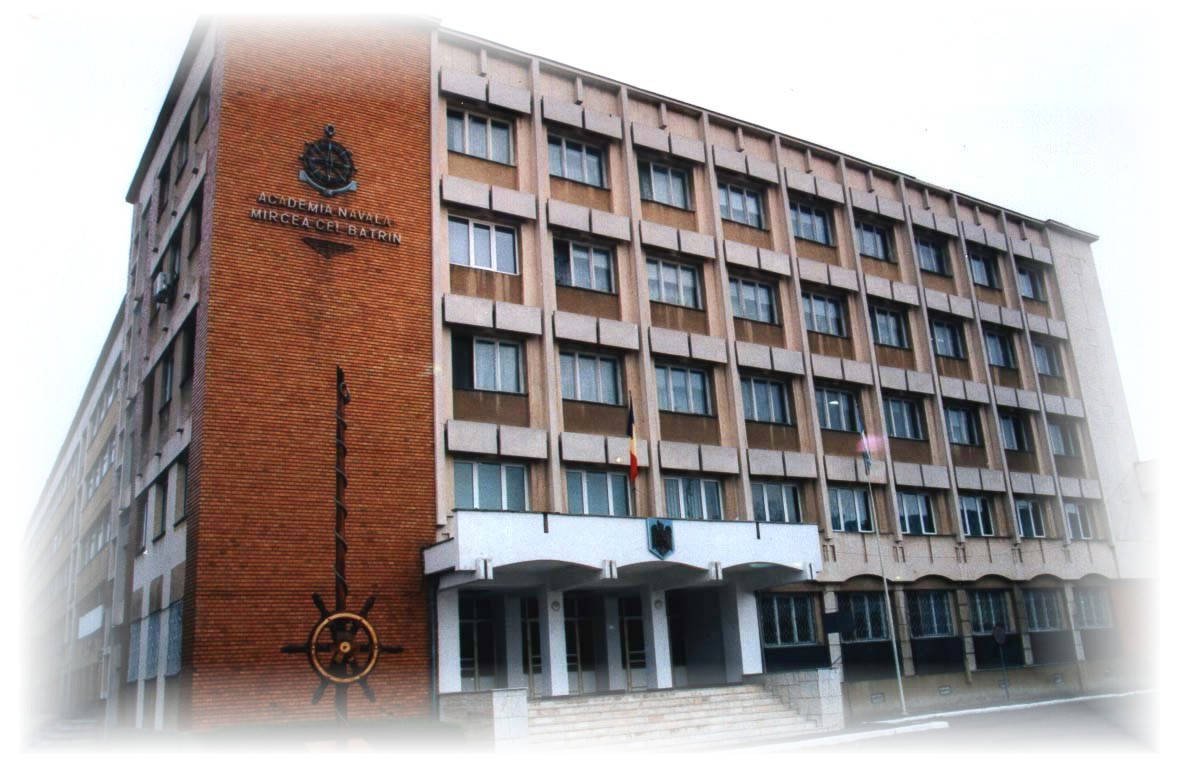
"Mircea cel Bătrân" Naval Academy in Constanța

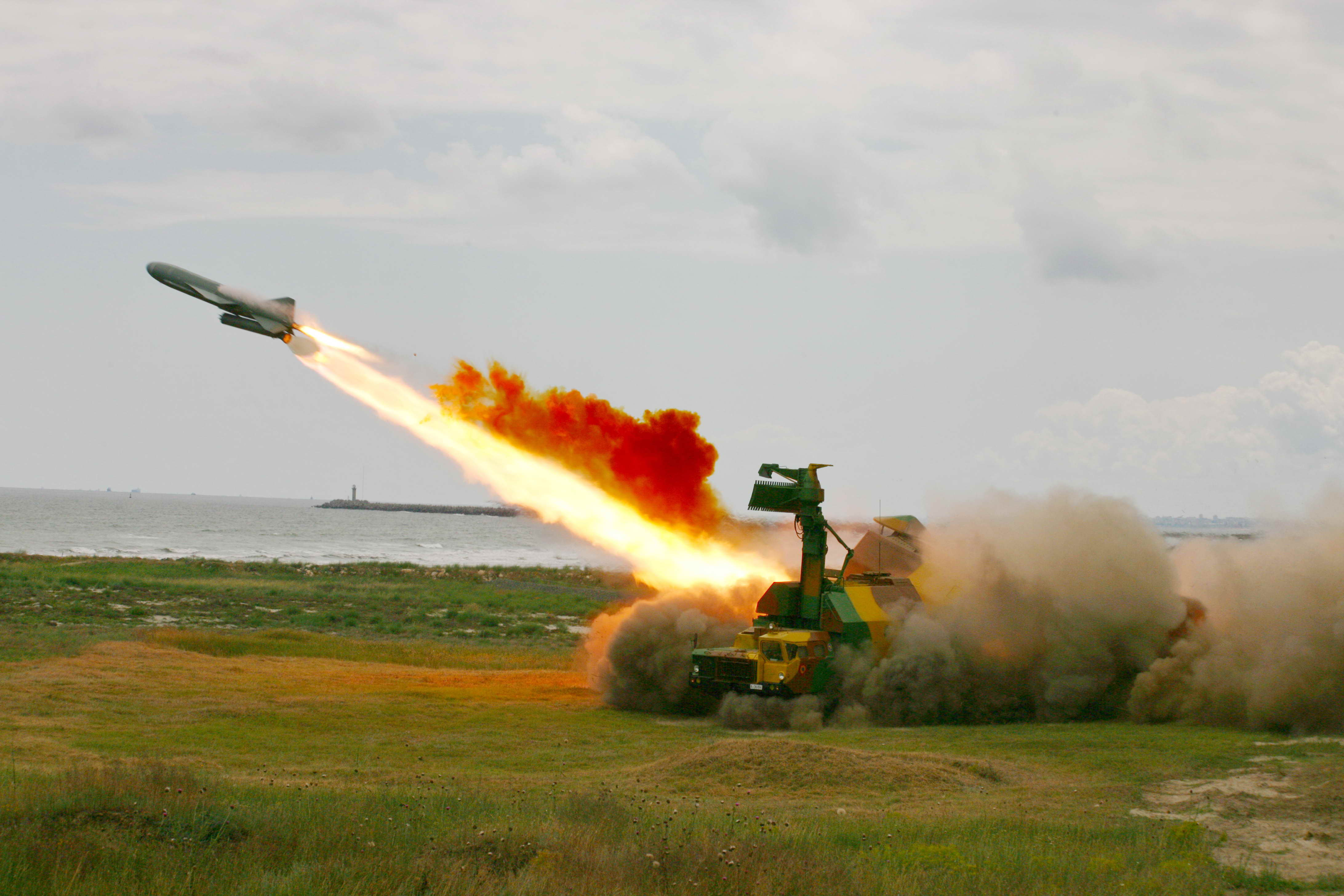
4K51 Rubezh anti-ship missile launching system at Capu Midia firing range

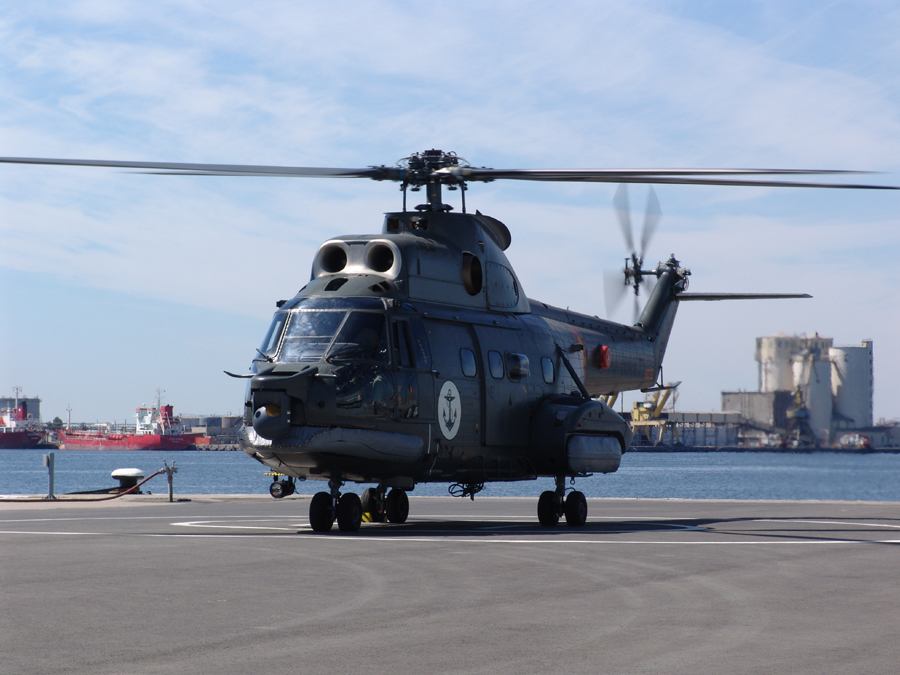
IAR 330 Puma Naval

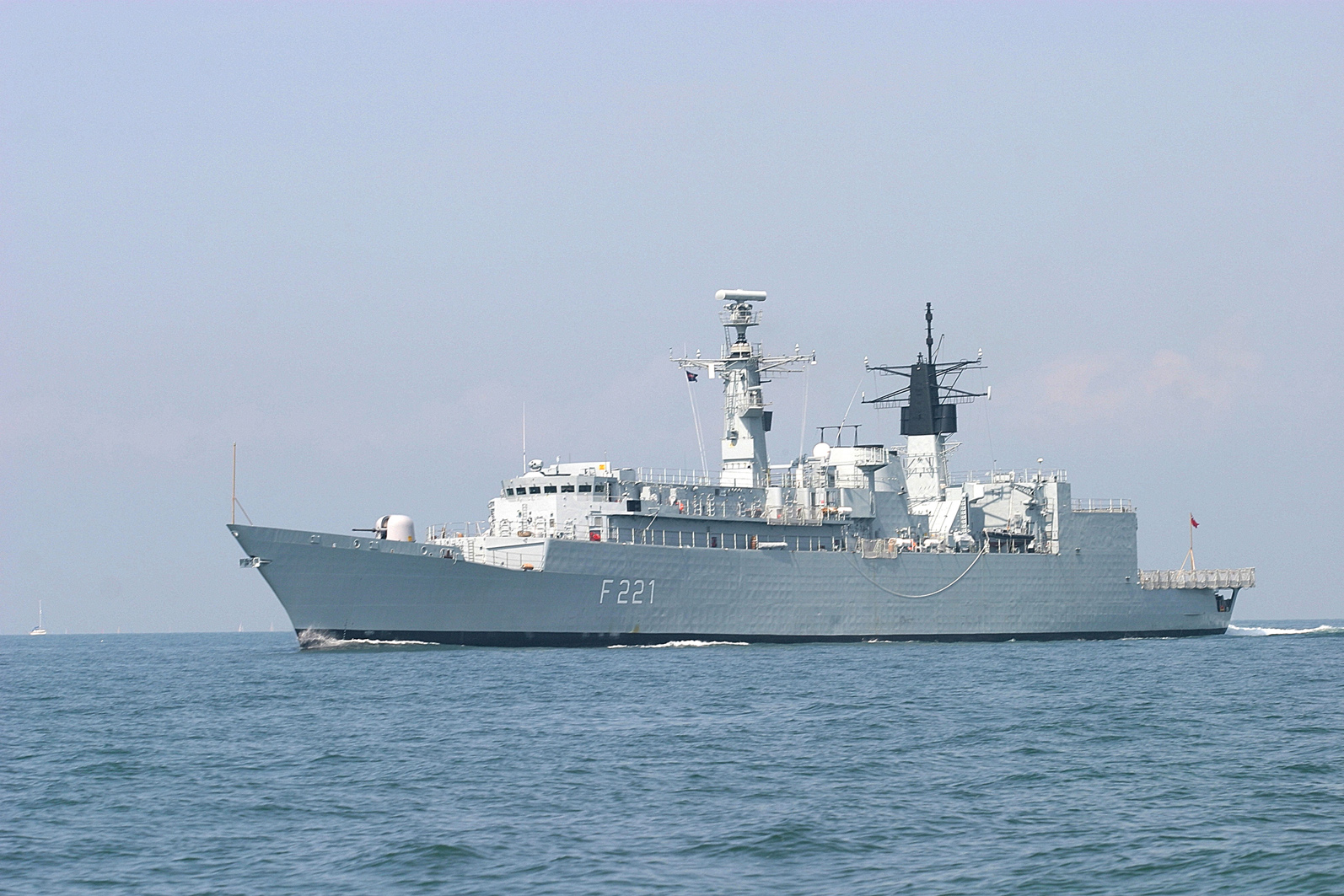
The frigate Regele Ferdinand is the current flagship of the Romanian Navy.

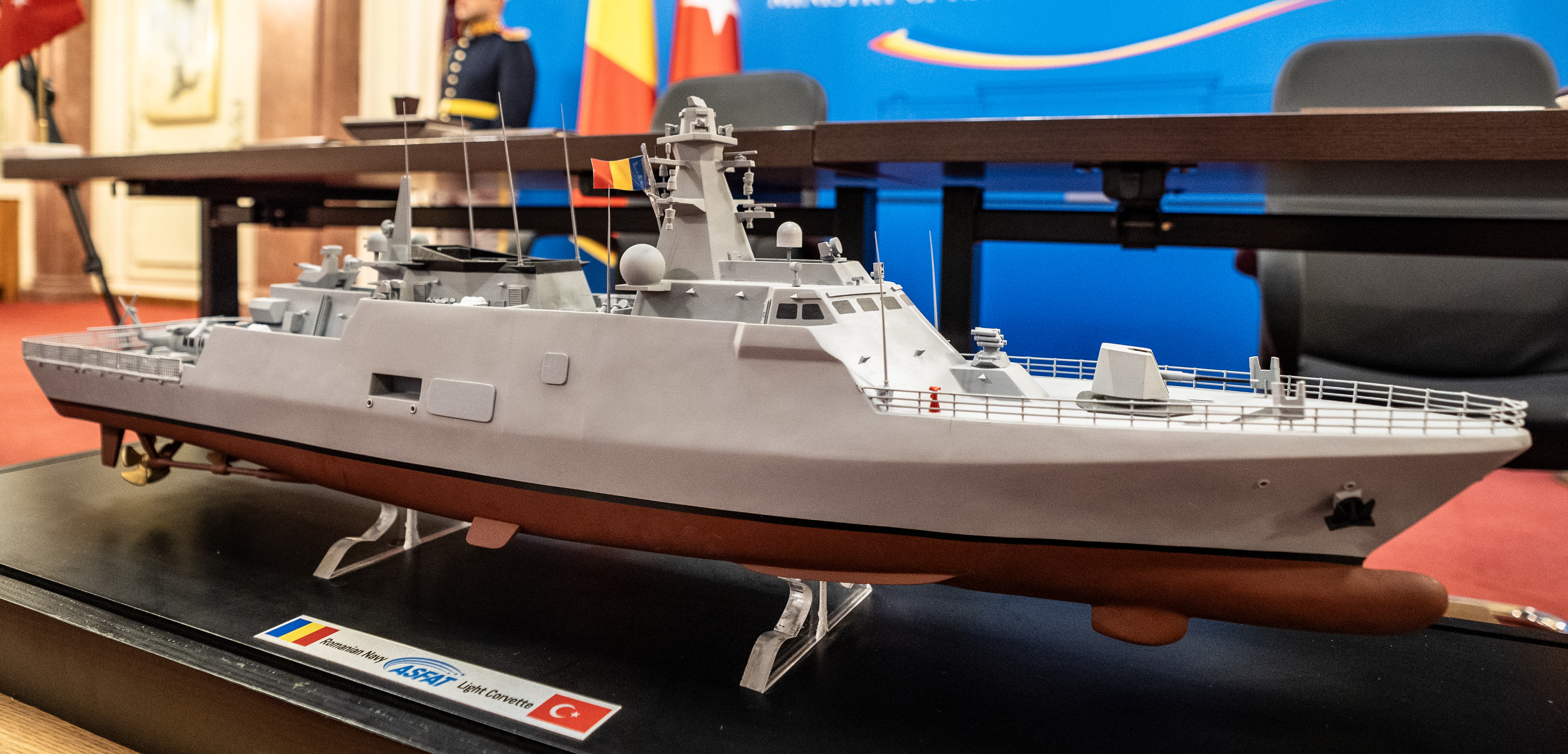
Scale model of the Romanian Hisar class light corvette

The Romanian Navy is organized in one Frigate Flotilla and one Riverine Flotilla. Equipment includes two Type 22 frigates, one Mărăşeşti-class frigate, five corvettes (two Tetal-I and two Tetal-II and Romanian corvette Contraamiral Roman), three Tarantul-I missile corvettes, one minelayer, four minesweepers, two minehunters, three Mihail Kogălniceanu-class river monitors, five Smârdan-class riverine armored patrol boats and other small craft and auxiliary ships. The last Osa class-based Epitrop torpedo boats were retired in November 2023.

As of 2026, c. 8,000 men and women serve in the Romanian Navy. The main base of the Romanian Navy is located at Constanța. The current chief of the Romanian Navy is Vice Admiral Mihai Panait, appointed on 15 August 2020. The Commander of the Romanian Fleet is Rear Admiral Cornel Cojocaru, and the Commander of the River Flotilla is Commander Fănel Rădulescu.

The Romanian Naval Forces ordered three IAR 330 Puma Naval helicopters, with the last one being commissioned in December 2008. The helicopters are of a similar configuration to those of the Romanian Air Force, including the SOCAT upgrade package; the Navy Pumas also have flotation gear fitted under the nose and main undercarriage fairings. They are currently operated from Navy frigates for search and rescue, medevac and maritime surveillance missions.

=== Structure of the Navy ===
- Naval Forces General Staff in Bucharest
  - Naval Component Command
- Fleet Command "Viceamiral Vasile Urseanu", in Constanța
  - 56th Frigate Flotilla "Contraamiral Horia Macellariu" (Mărășești, Regele Ferdinand and Regina Maria), in Constanța
    - 130th Logistic Support Ship Divizion (Croitor class and Stan Tug 1606 ships), in Constanța
    - Special Unmanned Systems Divizion (Shield AI MQ-35 V-BAT)
  - 256th Naval Helicopter Group (IAR 330 Puma Naval helicopters), in Tuzla
  - 150th Missile Fast Patrol Boat Divizion (Tarantul-I missile boats), in Mangalia
  - 50th Corvette Divizion, in Mangalia
    - Admiral Petre Bărbuneanu-class corvettes (Tetal-I)
    - Rear-Admiral Eustațiu Sebastian-class corvettes (Tetal-II)
    - Romanian corvette Contraamiral Roman (Hisar)
  - 146th MCM Divizion "Viceamiral Constantin Niculescu-Rizea" (Musca-class minesweepers, Cosar-class minelayer and Sandown-class minehunters), in Constanța
  - 508th Coastal Defence Missile Divizion (4K51 Rubezh missile), in Mangalia
    - Coastal Defence Missile Section with 4 launchers
    - 585th CBRN defense company
- River Flotilla Command "Mihail Kogălniceanu", in Brăila
  - 67th Gunboats Divizion "Comandor Virgil Alexandru Dragalina" (Mihail Kogălniceanu class and Smârdan class)
    - River monitors Section I, in Brăila
    - Armored Patrol Boat Section II, in Brăila
  - 88th River Patrol Boat Divizion "Amiral Gheorghe Sandu" (VB 76 class)
    - River Patrol Boat Section I, in Brăila
    - River Patrol Boat Section II, in Tulcea
  - 131st Logistic Support Ship Divizion (Lupeni-class river tugboats)
    - Logistic Support Ship Section I, in Brăila
    - Logistic Support Ship Section II, in Tulcea
  - 307th Marine Infantry Regiment "Heracleea" in Babadag
    - Regiment Command
    - Marine Infantry Battalion
    - Combat Support Battalion
      - General Staff Company
      - ISR Company
      - Artillery Battery
    - Logistics Company
- Naval Logistics Base "Pontica", in Constanța
  - Command River Ship MUREȘ
  - 129th Special and Logistic Support Ship Divizion, in Mangalia
  - 338th Naval Technical Maintenance Center, in Constanța
  - 335th Logistic Support Group, in Mangalia
    - 305th Mixed Depot, in Mangalia
  - 329th Logistic Support Group, in Brăila
    - 319th Mixed Sector, in Galați
  - 330th Logistic Support Group "Palazu Mare", in Constanța
    - 340th Mixed Depot, in Murfatlar
  - 325th Logistic Support Group, in Tulcea
    - 342nd Mixed Depot "Ion Jalea", in Codru
    - 278th Mixed Sector, in Slava Cercheză
- Distinct Specialised Structures
  - 39th Diving Center "Amiral Ilie Ștefan", in Constanța
    - 175th Combat Divers Divizion "Comandor Constantin Scarlat", in Constanța
      - Combat and Incursion Divers
      - EOD divers
      - River divers
    - 176th Deep Sea Divers Divizion "Emil Racoviță", in Constanța
    - Support Company
    - Underwater Research Laboratory
    - Hyperbaric Laboratory
    - Diver Training Complex
    - Diving Equipment Maintenance Section
    - Combat Diver Logistics Support Ship Midia
    - Diving Support Vessel Grigore Antipa
    - Diver Support and Intervention Vessel Grozavul
    - Diving Patrol Boat Saturn
    - Diving Patrol Boat Venus
    - Romanian submarine Delfinul
  - 243rd Radio-Electronics and Surveillance Brigade "Callatis", in Constanța
    - Naval Intelligence Office
    - SCOMAR Operations Center
    - Support Battalion
    - Logistic Support Battalion
      - Logistics Company
  - Naval Forces IT and Cyber Defence Center, in Constanța
    - Cyber Defence Section
    - Naval Information Systems Analysis, Design and Implementation Section
    - Network and IT Services Management Section
  - Naval Forces Training, Simulation, Evaluation and War Games Center, in Constanța
    - Simulation and War Games Training Section
    - Training and Evaluation Section
  - Maritime Hydrographic Directorate "Comandor Alexandru Cătuneanu", in Constanța
    - Mine Warfare Data Center – M.W.D.C.
  - Naval Medical Center, in Constanța
  - 110th Communication and Information Systems Center "Viceamiral ing. Grigore Marteş", in Mamaia-Sat
    - 2nd Communications, Informatics and Radio Frequency Management Center
      - Local Communications and Informatics Group, in Bucharest
        - Locally Managed Center
    - Local Communications and Informatics Group, in Brăila
    - Local Communications and Informatics Center, in Constanța
      - Locally Managed Center
    - Support Company
      - Transport Platoon
  - Naval Forces Support Group "Ovidius", in Constanța
    - Unit Headquarters
    - Combat Subunits
      - Military Police Company
      - Security Company
    - Logistics Subunits
      - Naval Forces General Staff Support Company
      - Naval Component Command Support Company
      - Support Formations
      - Storage Formations
      - Recovery and Rest Formations
      - Medical Formations
    - Naval Forces Media Office
  - National Museum of the Romanian Navy, in Constanța
- Training
  - "Mircea cel Bătrân" Naval Academy, in Constanța
    - 306th Training and Military Operations Support Ship Divizion
    - Training ship Mircea
    - Training ship Constanța
  - "Vice Admiral Constantin Bălescu" Naval Interarm Training School, in Mangalia
  - "Admiral Ion Murgescu" Navy Petty Officer School, in Constanța
  - National Military College "Alexandru Ioan Cuza", in Constanța

=== Bases ===
As of 2011, the naval bases are in:

- Constanța – home of the frigate flotilla.
- Mangalia – home of the corvette squadron.
- Tulcea – home of the Smârdan (Brutar-II)-class river patrol monitors.
- Brăila – home of the Mihail Kogălniceanu-class river patrol monitors and the VB 141-class small river patrol boats.

=== Naval infantry ===
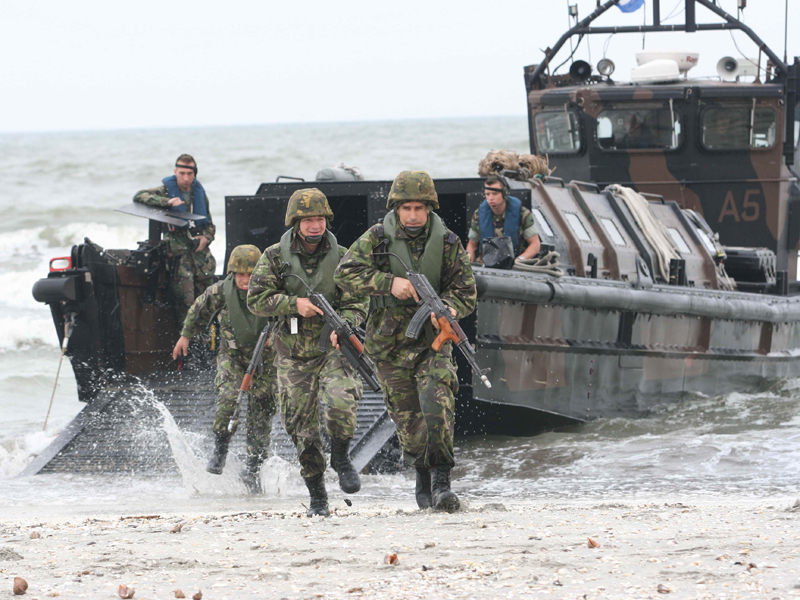
Soldiers from the 307th Marine Infantry Regiment disembark from a Dutch landing ship at Vadu beach during a military exercise

The 307th Marine Infantry Regiment (Regimentul 307 Infanterie Marină) is the coastal defence unit of the Romanian Navy. The unit was formed in the mid-1970s for the defence of the Danube Delta and Romanian Black Sea shore. It was initially located at 2 Mai village near Mangalia, but since 1975 the Marine Battalion was moved to Babadag, Tulcea County. "The 307th Marine Infantry Regiment is destined to carry out military operations in an amphibious river and lagoon environment, the security of objectives in the coastal area, the Danube Delta and the support of local authorities in case of a civil emergency." Its base is near Babadag military training range and is subordinated to the Riverine Flotilla.

The battalion is organized into infantry, reconnaissance, sniper, mortars, anti-tank artillery, engineers, communications, logistic and naval support units. Standard equipment includes: PA md. 86 assault rifles, PM md. 64 light machine guns, Md. 66 machine guns, 60/82/120 mm mortars, AG-7 and AG-9 launchers, 76 mm Md. 82 mountain howitzers, 11 ABC-79M and 3 TABC-79M armoured personnel carriers. The 307th Marine Infantry Regiment was involved in military exercises with similar troops from United States, the Netherlands, Spain, Portugal, Italy and Ukraine that were organized locally or abroad. Also, two companies from this unit have participated in the KFOR mission "Joint Enterprise" in 2008–09.

Since June 1, 2018, the 307th Marine Battalion has been redesignated as the 307th Marine Infantry Regiment.

== Equipment ==
=== Sea Fleet ===
For the river fleet and auxiliary vessels, see List of active Romanian Navy ships.

| Name | Origin | Type | Class | Details |
Submarine
| S-521 Delfinul | Soviet Union | Conventional submarine | Kilo | Not operational; used for dockside training |
Frigates
| F-111 Mărășești | Romania | Multipurpose frigate | Mărășești | |
| F-221 Regele Ferdinand | United Kingdom | Multipurpose frigate | Type 22 | Ex-HMS Coventry |
| F-222 Regina Maria | United Kingdom | Multipurpose frigate | Type 22 | Ex-HMS London |
Corvettes
| Cvt 260 Amiral Petre Bărbuneanu | Romania | Multipurpose corvette | Tetal-I | |
| Cvt 261 Contraamiral Roman | Turkey | Light multirole corvette | Hisar | Ex-TCG Akhisar |
| Cvt 263 Vice-Amiral Eugeniu Roșca | Romania | Multipurpose corvette | Tetal-I | |
| Cvt 264 Contraamiral Eustațiu Sebastian | Romania | Multipurpose corvette | Tetal-II | |
| Cvt 265 Contraamiral Horia Macellariu | Romania | Multipurpose corvette | Tetal-II | |
Missile corvette
| NPR 188 Zborul | Soviet Union | Missile corvette | Tarantul class | |
| NPR 189 Pescărușul | Soviet Union | Missile corvette | Tarantul class | |
| NPR 190 Lăstunul | Soviet Union | Missile corvette | Tarantul class | |
Mine warfare
| DM-24 Lt. Remus Lepri | Romania | Minesweeper | Musca | Transferred to the Naval Forces Training School in Mangalia on 1 June 2023. |
| DM-25 Lt. Lupu Dinescu | Romania | Minesweeper | Musca | |
| DM-29 Lt. Dimitrie Nicolescu | Romania | Minesweeper | Musca | 8 September 2022 contacted floating rogue mine some 20 nautical miles (37 km; 23 mi) northeast of Constanța, in the Black Sea, and suffered mine explosion hit in the aft area, resulting in a small-sized hull breach. Navy ship Grozavul was sent to tow minesweeper to Constanța. |
| DM-30 Slt. Alexandru Axente | Romania | Minesweeper | Musca | |
| M270 Sublocotenent Ion Ghiculescu | United Kingdom | Minehunter | Sandown class | Ex-HMS Blyth |
| M271 Căpitan Constantin Dumitrescu | United Kingdom | Minehunter | Sandown class | Ex-HMS Pembroke |
| PM-274 Viceamiral Constantin Bălescu | Romania | Minelayer | Cosar | |

=== Naval Aviation ===
| Model | Origin | Type | Variant | Quantity | Details |
Helicopters
| IAR 330 | France; Romania | Maritime helicopter (ASW) | Puma Naval | 3 | Includes the SOCAT upgrade package. The Navy Pumas also have flotation gear fitted under the nose and main undercarriage fairings. Currently operated from Navy frigates for search and rescue, medevac, maritime surveillance missions and ASW. |
| H215M | France; Romania | Maritime helicopter (ASW and ASuW) | Cougar Naval | 0 (+ 2 on order) | The naval version of the H215M is powered by two Turbomeca Makila 1A1 turboshaft engines. This version is mainly used for Anti-surface unit warfare (ASUW), fitted with Marte-ER missiles; Anti-submarine warfare (ASW), fitted with a variable-depth sonar and torpedoes; Search and rescue; and Sea patrols. For deck landing, securing at high sea states, maneuver and traverse this variant can be fitted with ASIST. |
Unmanned aerial vehicles
| MQ-35A V-BAT | United States | Unmanned aerial vehicle | | 4 | The first four V-BAT drones were received as donation by the United States. The system was delivered by 2026. A second phase will follow, in which the Romanian Naval Forces will purchase two additional V-BAT systems (eight drones). |

=== Future equipment ===
The Romanian government plans to acquire new vessels to modernize the Romanian Naval Forces. This plan includes:

- Acquiring 4 new corvettes: Previously these were to be built locally and based on the Sigma 10514 design of Damen Group. However, the decision was repealed in 2017. In July 2019, Naval Group won a €1.2 billion contract for four Gowind multi-mission corvettes, a new maintenance center, and a training center. Naval Group was due to build the first corvette within three years, while the remaining three corvettes would have been constructed by Constanța Shipyard and delivered before 2026. However, this deal had not been concluded and was cancelled as of July 2023. After the cancelled contract with Naval Group, Romania joined the European Patrol Corvette program, further signing a cooperation agreement with OCCAR for the corvette acquisition in 2025. The first corvette is expected to be delivered in 2030, with the rest being delivered by 2035.
- Acquiring 2 OPVs and 2 diving support vessels: In 2026, Rheinmetall was chosen to build two MMPV 90 offshore patrol vessels and two diving support vessels through the Security Action for Europe program. The ships will be built at the Mangalia shipyard which was acquired by Rheinmetall in October 2026 for this purpose.
- Acquiring 3 new frigates: As part of the Romanian Navy endowment programme spanning 20 years, plans are to build three new frigates.
- As of 2018, acquiring 3 new submarines, which would also be built locally at a Romanian shipyard. In 2022, Romania signed a letter of intent with France to purchase Scorpène-class submarines.

== Ranks and insignia ==
=== Commissioned officer ranks ===
The rank insignia of commissioned officers.

| NATO code | OF-10 | OF-9 | OF-8 | OF-7 | OF-6 | OF-5 | OF-4 | OF-3 | OF-2 | OF-1 |
|---|---|---|---|---|---|---|---|---|---|---|---|
| Romanian Naval Forces |
| Romanian Naval Forces | Mareșal | Amiral | Viceamiral | Contraamiral | Contraamiral de flotilă | Comandor | Căpitan-comandor | Locotenent-comandor | Căpitan | Locotenent | Aspirant |

=== Other ranks ===
The rank insignia of non-commissioned officers and enlisted personnel.

| NATO code | OR-9 | | OR-8 | OR-7 | OR-6 | OR-5 | OR-4 | | | OR-3 | OR-2 | OR-1 |
|---|---|---|---|---|---|---|---|---|---|---|---|---|
| Romanian Naval Forces | | | | | | | | | | | No insignia |
| Romanian Naval Forces | Plutonier adjutant principal | Plutonier adjutant | Plutonier-major | Plutonier | Sergent-major | Sergent | Caporal clasa I | Caporal clasa a II-a | Caporal clasa a III-a | Fruntaș | Soldat |
