= Romanian frigate Mărășești =

Frigate in the Romanian Navy

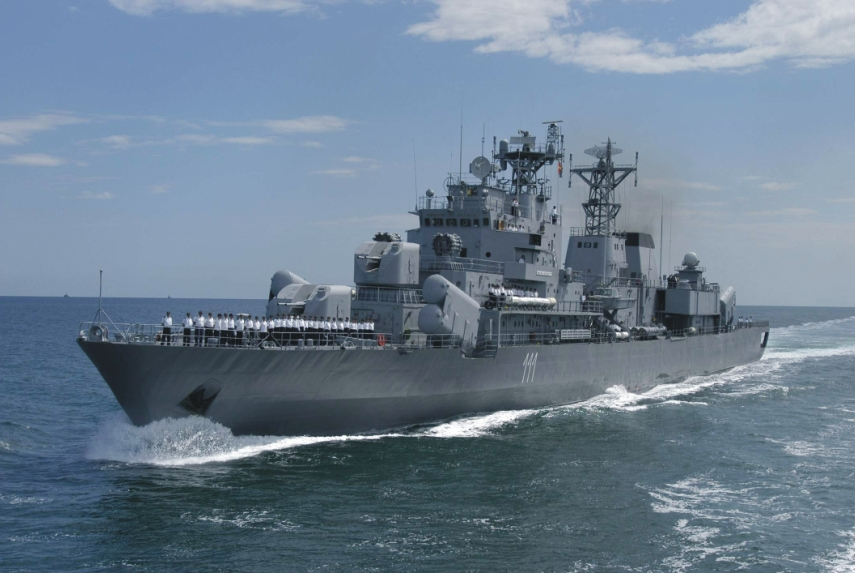
- Mărășești (F111) during "Litoral 06" exercise

History

Romania
- Name: Mărășești
- Namesake: Battle of Mărășești
- Builder: 2 May Naval Shipyard, Mangalia
- Laid down: 7 August 1979
- Launched: 4 June 1981
- Commissioned: 3 June 1985 (entry to service); 2 August 1986 (official ceremony)
- Renamed: Muntenia (1986–1990); Timișoara (1990)
- Home port: Constanța
- Identification: Pennant number: F111; MMSI number: 264800052; MarineTraffic ID: 6269111; Callsign:YQXB
- Status: In active service
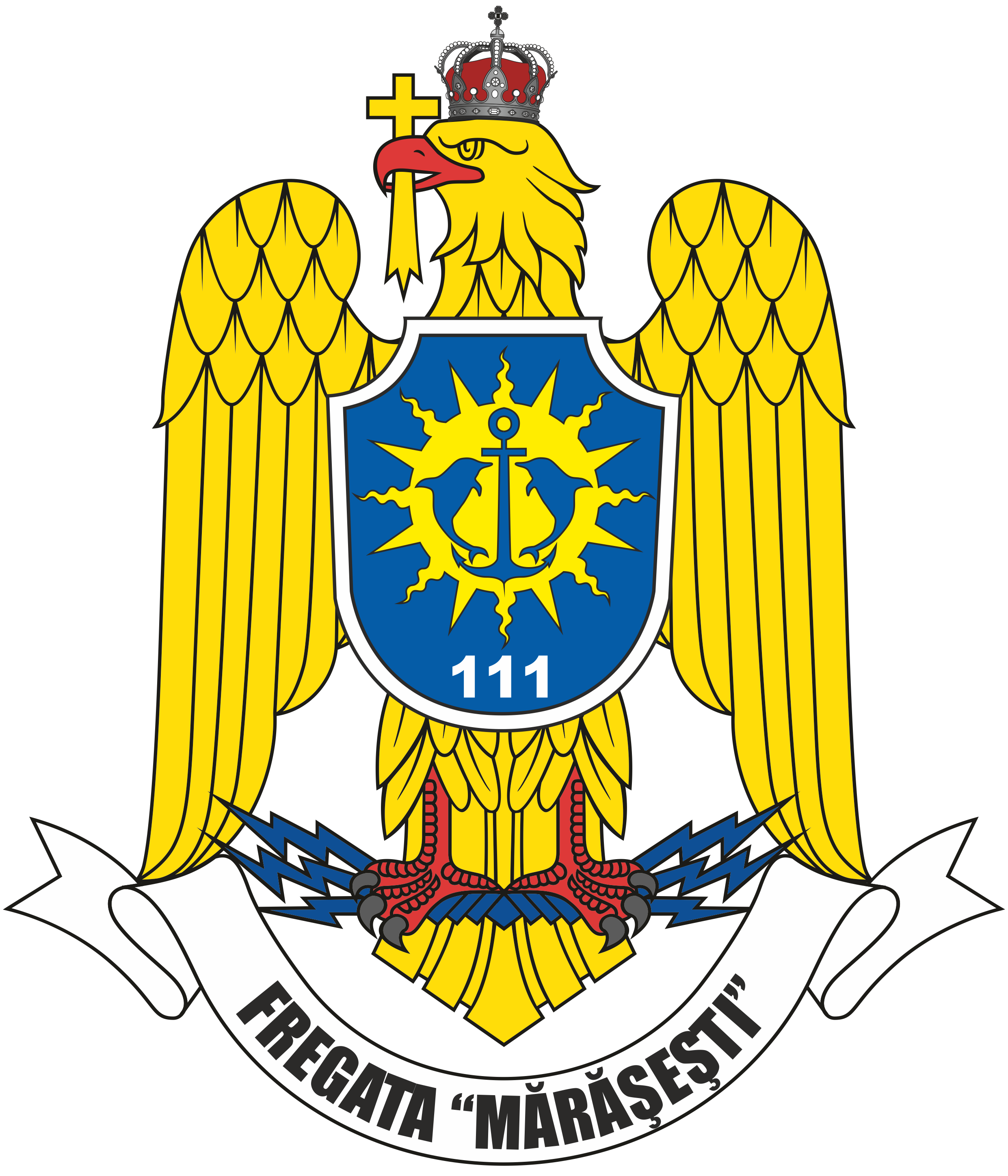
- Badge

General characteristics
- Class & type: Frigate
- Displacement: 4,754 t (4,679 long tons) standard; 5,790 t (5,700 long tons) full
- Length: 144.6 m (474 ft 5 in)
- Beam: 14.8 m (48 ft 7 in)
- Draught: 4.9 m (16 ft 1 in)
- Propulsion: 4 × Diesel engines, 8,440 bhp (6,290 kW)
- Speed: 27 knots (50 km/h; 31 mph)
- Range: 2,800 nautical miles (5,200 km) at 12 knots (22 km/h)
- Complement: 233
- Sensors & processing systems: MR-302 Rubka surveillance and target detection radar; Garpun-E target detection radar; MR-105 Turiel fire control radar; MR-123 Wympiel fire control radar; MG-322 Argun′ sonar; Racal Decca navigation radar
- Armament: 2 × twin 76 mm (3.0 in) AK-726 guns; 4 × single 30 mm (1.2 in) AK-630M CIWS; 4 × double launchers for P-15M (SS-N-2C) anti-ship missiles; 2 × 12-barrel 213 mm (8.4 in) RBU-6000 anti-submarine rocket launchers; 2 × triple 533 mm torpedo tubes; Mines
- Aircraft carried: 1 × IAR 330 Puma Naval; MQ-35A V-BAT UAV

Mărășești (F111) is a frigate currently serving with the Romanian Navy. Mărășești served as the flagship of the navy between 1985–2004, when Regele Ferdinand (formerly HMS Coventry) became the new flagship. She is the largest warship of the Romanian Navy ever built in Romania.

== Background ==
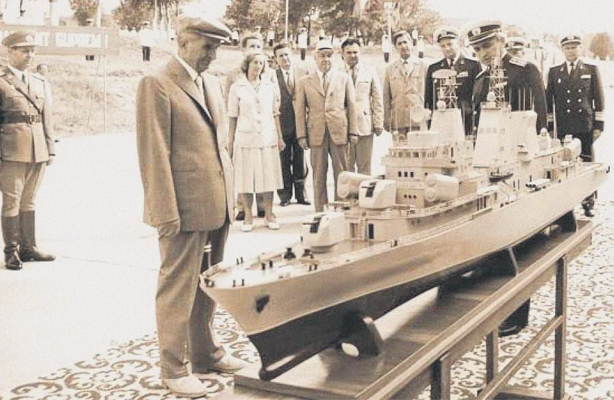
Nicolae Ceaușescu with the scale model of Muntenia

Nicolae Ceaușescu, the leader of Socialist Republic of Romania, had ambitions to make the country as independent as possible and to develop its industry, one of them being the shipbuilding industry. In the 1970s, the state launched a program of building large warships of domestic designs instead of buying them from the Soviet Union, which supplied ships to the Eastern Bloc countries. These ships were built at the 2 May Naval Shipyard (Romanian: Santierul 2. Mai) in Mangalia on the Black Sea coast. Although Romania only had experience designing and building light frigates, such as the Amiral Petre Bărbuneanu class, it undertook the ambitious task of designing a ship the size of a destroyer.

The ship's design was to be the work of Romanian engineers only, without the participation of foreign specialists. Systems which could not be developed independently, or licences acquired, were predominantly procured from the Soviet Union. All weapon systems and electronic equipment were of Soviet origin, though still not modern due to the Soviet export policies on individual system sales. The choice of diesel propulsion, provided again by the Soviet Union, was also not optimal for a ship of this size.

According to some publications, the initial consideration was to build a hybrid of a missile destroyer and a helicopter carrier. The lack of experience in building such ships resulted in toning down of the final design. Despite difficulties, the original ship was built and was capable of carrying two light helicopters. It became the largest warship built in Romania. The second ship is believed to have been planned, but this was postponed due to financial issues in the 1980s and abandoned after the collapse of Ceaușescu regime.

== Design and description ==
As a result of independent development by Romania, the ship received unique features of construction and naval architecture due to absence of experience with the construction of ships of this size, distinguishing it from destroyers or frigates built by other countries. The hull is of flush deck design, with high freeboard and a slight sheer at the bow. The height of the freeboard is approximately 7 meters at the bow and around 6 meters amidships. The moderately sloped stem is blunt when viewed from above, and the sides have a longitudinal bend from the bow almost to the middle of the length. The ship has bulbous bow to reduce drag. However, the shape of the hull below the waterline is not considered successful, which is manifested in the waves being generated at low speeds.

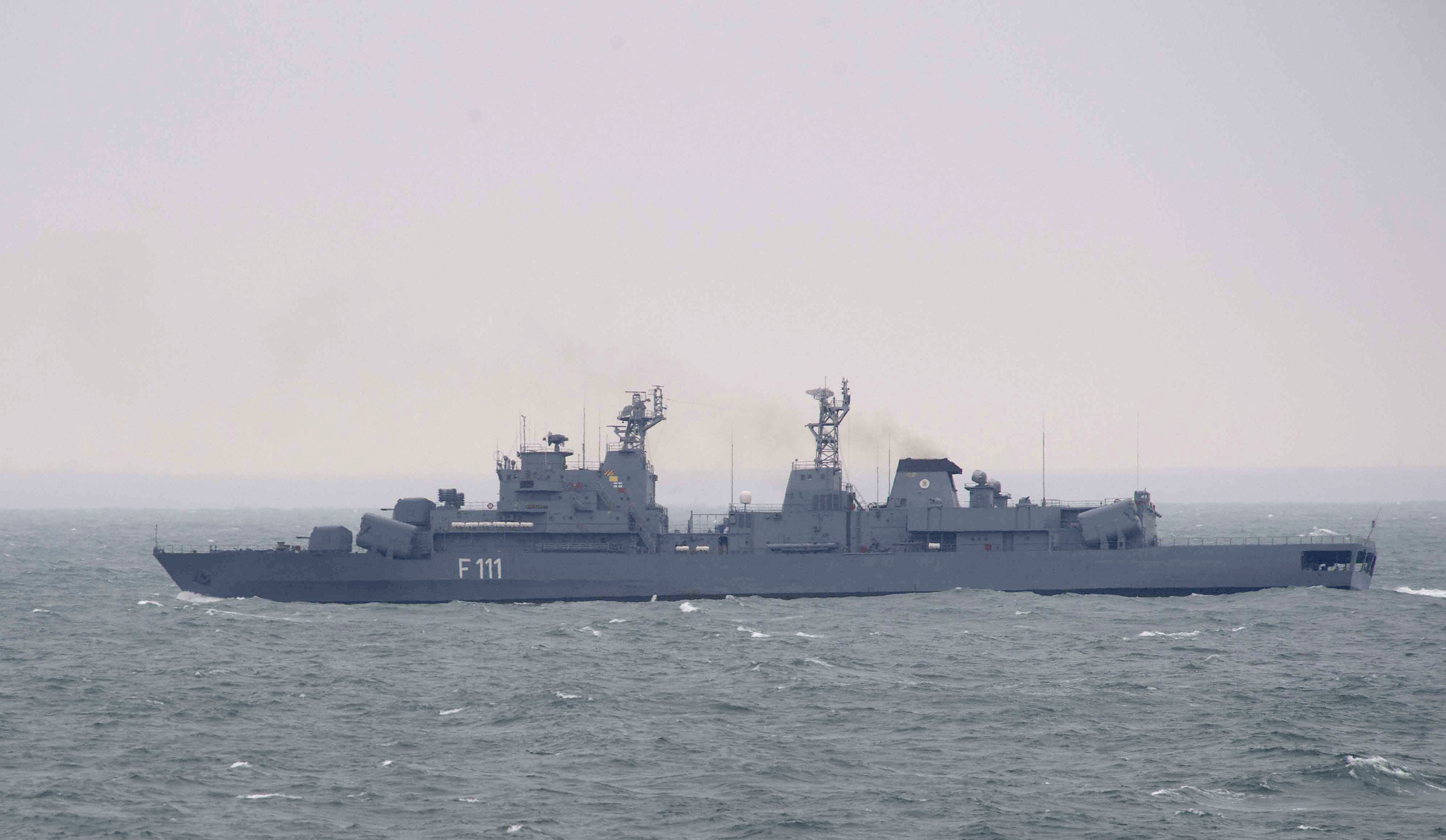
Silhouette of Mărășești in 2015

The ship has a long group of superstructures, including a large multi-story boxy forward superstructure, which was already outdated at that time. The first AK-726 turret is placed on the foredeck, followed by the second turret in superfiring position on the first floor of the superstructure. Behind them on the next floor are the depth charge rocket launchers, and beyond that the elevated part of the superstructure with the navigational bridge. On the bridge roof there is also a box superstructure which is the base of the fire-control radar, and in the rear part of the bridge roof is the base for the forward mast. After the gap amidships is the second superstructure, ended with an integrated helicopter hangar. Above its forward part there is a superstructure, supporting the aft lattice mast, and to the aft of the mast is a single funnel. A characteristic element of the ship's architecture are the large double anti-ship missile launcher containers on both sides of the fore and aft superstructure. Originally, the fore launchers were mounted on the deck of the first floor of the superstructure, behind the superfiring AK-726 turret. After the reconstruction, they were moved to the upper deck, on both sides of the superfiring turret. The rectangular aft deck is a helipad, and below it, at the end of the stern there is a working half-deck cut out in the hull with mooring and anchor capstans. The ship has transom stern.

The standard displacement, as of 2006, is 4,754 tonnes (4,679 long tons), and the full displacement is 5,790 tonnes (5,700 long tons). The ship is 144.6 m (474 ft) long, 14.8 m (49 ft) wide and draught of 4.9 m (16 ft).

The ship's complement consists of 233 personnel, including 22 officers, 72 non-commissioned officers and 139 sailors, and according to other older data was 270 people, including 25 officers.

=== Armament ===
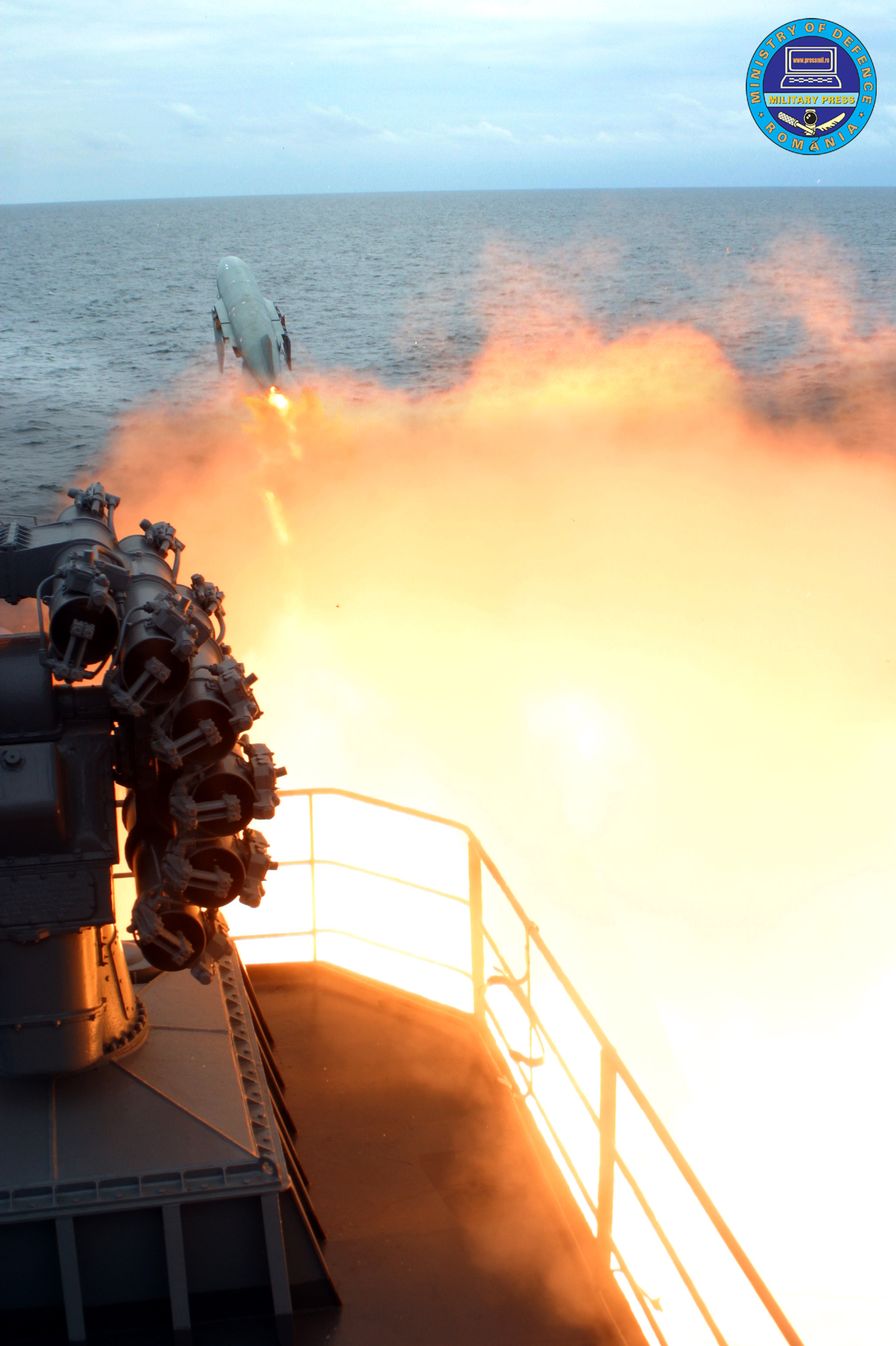
A P-15 Termit missile launched from Mărășești

The main anti-ship weapon consisted of P-20M guided-missile system, including the P-21 anti-ship missiles with an active radar head and P-22 anti-ship missiles with a passive thermal homing head. The missiles are fired from four KT-138E fixed double container-launchers, holding eight missiles, with two directed towards the bow and two towards the stern. The missiles have a range of up to 83 km (45 NM). The missile is directed by the Koral-E system. The number of missiles and launchers were the same as on Project 1241E missile corvettes, only doubled in number. Initially, a special radar station for the Garpun-E target detection radar was not acquired, which was only installed in the 1990s. Before reconstruction, the ship did not receive any anti-aircraft missile launcher, which could have been foreseen in the initial design assumptions in the form of the Soviet 4K33 Osa-M short-range missile launcher. It was not until the 1990s that two quadruple Fasta-4M/2 launchers were installed for 9K32M Strela-2M infrared homing short-range anti-aircraft missiles. These missiles however, were obsolete and practically only effective against retreating targets, with a range of 2,800 m against incoming aircraft and a ceiling of up to 2,300 m.

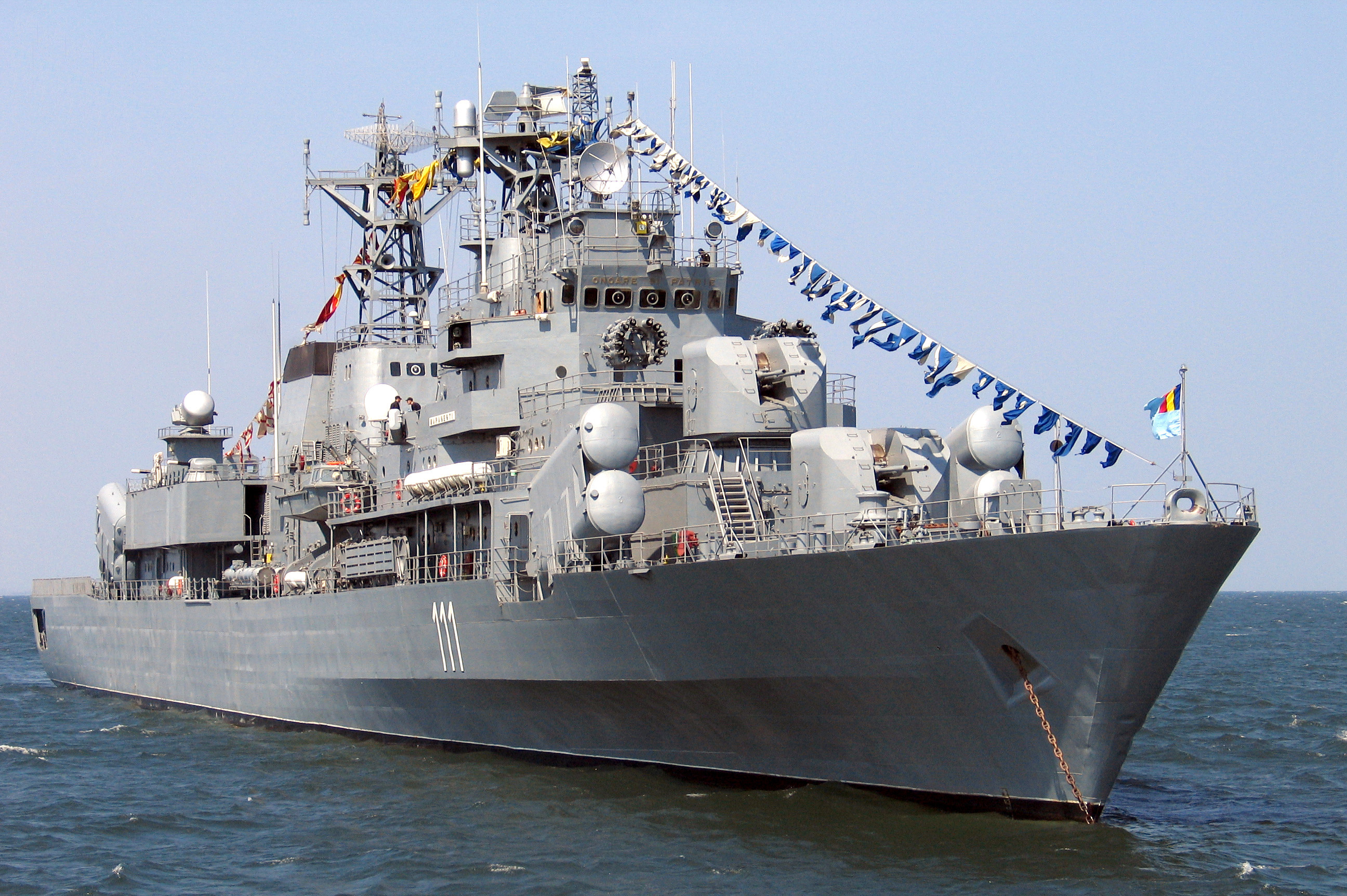
Mărășești, showing its main guns, missile launchers, and rocket launchers forward of the bridge

The main guns consisted of four 76.2 mm AK-726 automatic naval guns in two ZIF-67 twin-barreled turrets, guided by the MR-105 Turiel radar. The ammunition supply is 1,600 rounds per turret, the range is 13 km for surface target and 9 km for aerial target, and the rate of fire is 90 rounds/minutes per barrel. Since the 1990s, the ship has also four 30 mm AK-630M six-barrel automatic cannons in unmanned turrets located in the aft part on either sides of the hangar and funnel. They act as point-blank defense, together with two MR-123 Wympiel fire control radars, placed between pairs of turrets on the sides, and Kolonek backup electro-optical sights. Initially, the ship had four twin-barrel 30 mm AK-230 cannon turrets instead, with MR-104 Ryś radars placed along the longitudinal axis of the hull. In general, the ship's anti-aircraft armament which based only on cannons was already considered insufficient on the battlefield at the start of its service.

For anti-submarine warfare there are two triple 533.4 mm torpedo tubes, rotatable on either side amidships, firing 53-65K torpedoes or SET-53 anti-submarine torpedoes. The anti-submarine armament is complemented by two RBU-6000 Smerch-2 depth charge rocket launchers on the fore superstructure, reloaded automatically from below the superstructure deck. Their range is up to 6 km, and the weight of the warhead is 31 kg. In the 1990s, they replaced the initially installed 16-barrel RBU-2500 Smerch-1 launchers, manually loaded.

Mărășești's hangar can accommodate two IAR 316B light helicopters (license-built French Aérospatiale Alouette III). They were replaced with one IAR 330 Puma Naval (a modified licensed version of the Aérospatiale Puma, first flown in 2007) medium sea helicopter with greater capabilities.

=== Electronic equipment and sensor ===
The ship's radio-electronic equipment and sensors was initially entirely of Soviet origins. The MR-302 Rubka general surveillance and target detection radar has a range of up to 98 km against air targets and 30 km against ships. Its antenna was placed on the forward mast, and in the 1990s it was moved to the aft mast. Mărășești also received the Don-2 navigational radar. In the 1990s, the Garpun-E radiolocation station was added to the forward mast, which was used to detect sea targets and indicate them to the P-20M missiles. From the beginning, the ship was also equipped with fire control radars: MR-105 Turiel for AK-726 cannon and two MR-104 Ryś for AK-230 cannons, replaced in the 1990s by MR-123 Wympiel for AK-630 cannons.

The MG-322 Argun′ sonar station was used to detect submarines. The equipment was also equipped with a radio engineering reconnaissance system with two sets of Zaliv 13-14 and Zaliv 14-15 antennas on the stern mast, and a Nikiel-KM identification system.

In 2001, as part of adapting the ship to NATO systems, some systems were modernized by installing a digital communication and identification system of the Mk XII standard of the German company Aeromaritime Systembau. GPS receivers, a satellite communication system and a Link 14 standard data exchange link with the KWR-46 concealment device were also added, along with new Racal Decca navigational radar.

=== Propulsion system ===
The ship drive system consisted of four four-stroke, six-cylinder diesel engines 61D, working independently of each other, driving four shafts through single-stage gearboxes, with three-blade propellers mounted on them. The engines have a power of 8,000 hp (6,200 kW) for a total of 32,000 hp. The propellers on the outer shafts are adjustable pitch, driven by forward engine room engines, while the inner propellers, driven by engines in the aft engine room, has fixed pitch. Due to the use of shafts of the same length, the outer propellers are closer to the bow than the inner ones. The ship has two apron rudders behind the screws. Such a drive, with only engines driving individual propellers, is unusual for ships of this size and is not optimal, and its use was probably forced due to the unavailability of gas turbines or appropriate gears or for economic reasons.

The maximum speed is 27 knots (50 km/h). The ship's range is 2,800 nautical miles (5,200 km) at 12 knots (22 km/h) or 1,500 nautical miles (2,800 km) at 25 knots (46 km/h). The power plant also has four diesel-electric generators with a total power of 2800 kW.

== Construction and career ==
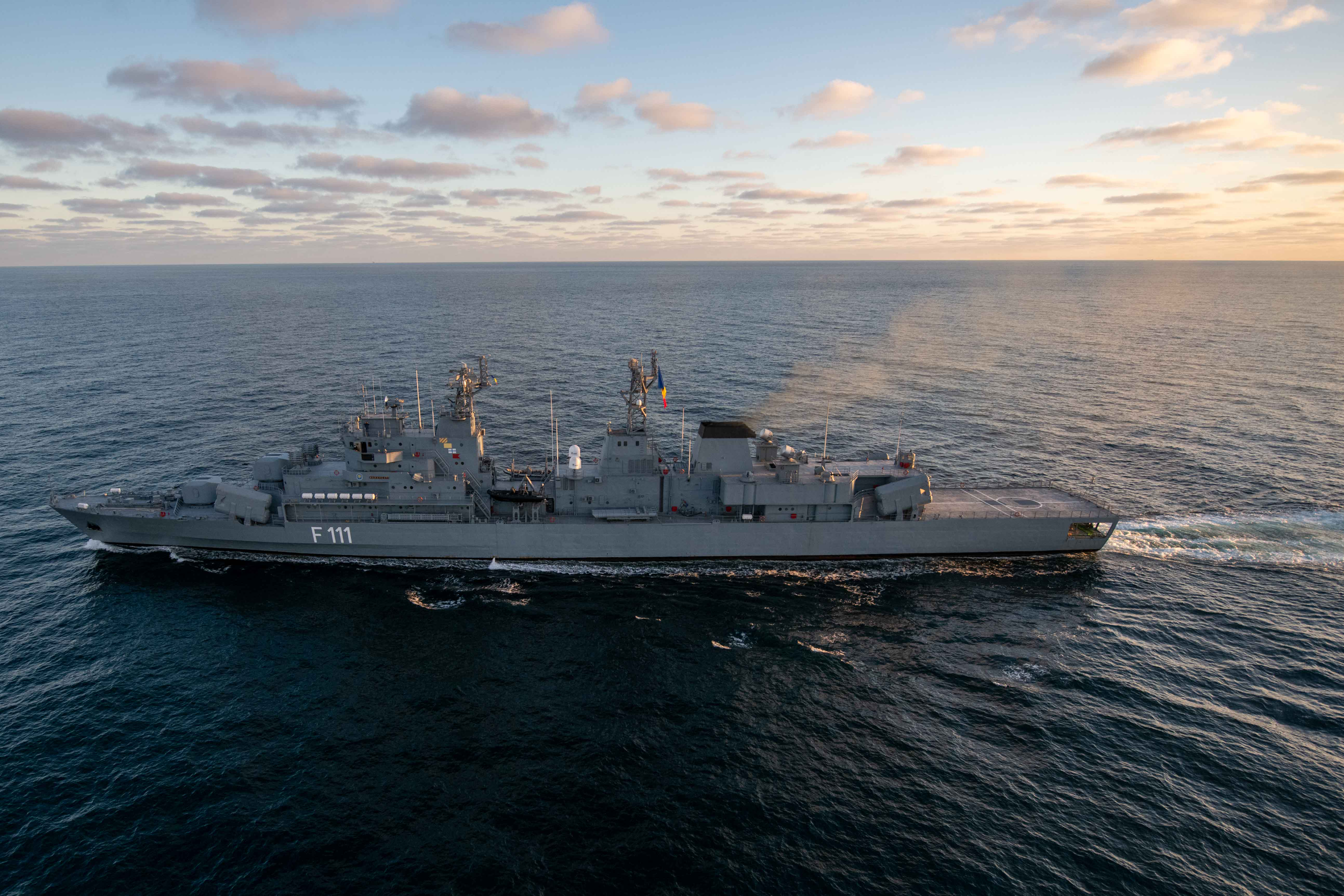
Mărășești in November 2021

Work on the construction of the ship began on 1 March 1978. The keel was laid down on 7 August 1979, although the dates of construction differ amongst the sources. (Note: Grotnik (2007:77) gives the date of 7 August 1979 as the start of construction, without specifying whether it is about laying the keel. On the website of the Romanian Naval Forces however, the date of the beginning of construction is 1 March 1978, without specifying what it refers to. Jane's Fighting Ships 2002–2003 p. 560 gives the date of keel laying as 7 August 1979.) The ship was launched on 4 June 1981. After a long period of fitting out, the ship began sea trials in 1985, and the ship was commissioned on 3 June 1985. (Note: Grotnik (2007:80) gives the date of 3 June 1985 as the technical acceptance of the ship, while according to Jane's Fighting Ships 2002–2003 p. 560 and Petlevanny (2009:160) the date was the entry into service date.) On 2 August 1986, she was officially commissioned by Nicolae Ceaușescu himself, and was given the name Muntenia, after a historical region in Romania. The ship was initially classified as "light helicopter cruiser" (crucișător usor port-elicopter).

After the ship entered service, its design flaws were revealed. The ship had high superstructures and masts with massive built-in bases, which together with the heavy rocket launchers placed on the first floor of the superstructures, negatively affected the stability of the ship. Even at low sea states, there were large tilts limiting the effectiveness of the use of armament. Though classified as a helicopter cruiser and able to carry an IAR 330L helicopter, the operability was never achieved. The insufficient necessary equipment, such as the lack of roll stabilizers, made it impossible to safely operate helicopters. As a consequence, she returned to the shipyard in June 1988 for reconstruction aimed at improving the stability characteristics.

The ship reconstruction was completed on 15 August 1992. The modification that were done are both masts were shortened and their massive bases were lowered, the funnel was slightly lowered and its shape was changed, and the heavy rocket launchers were moved one level lower to the upper deck. At the same time, the bow superstructure were adapted to the new depth charge rocket launchers and the location of the radars was changed. In the 1990s, some of the armament and electronic systems were also modernized, of which were delivered from the Soviet Union until 1998.

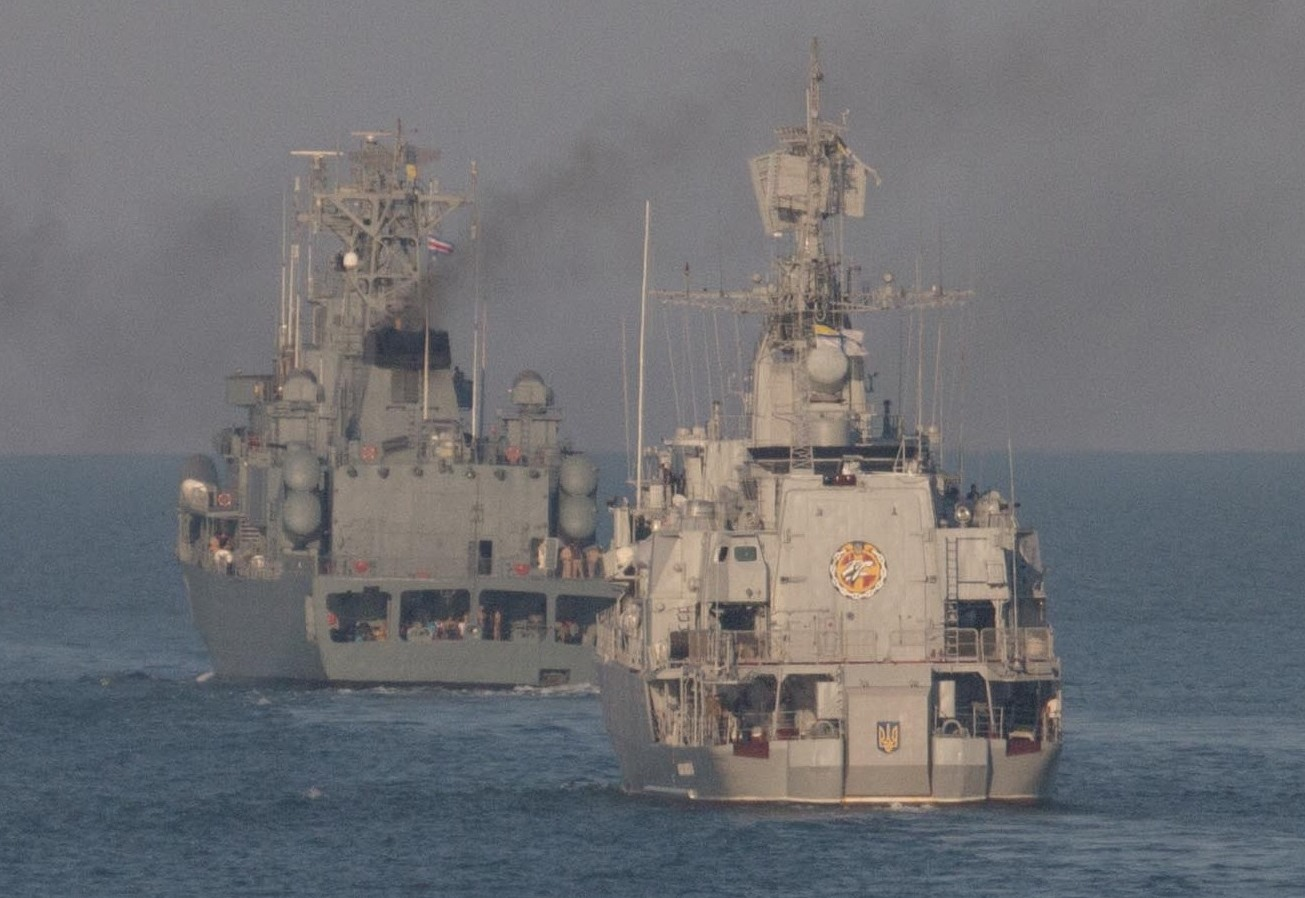
Mărășești (background) with Hetman Sahaidachny (foreground) in Black Sea during Exercise Sea Breeze 2017

In the meantime, Nicolae Ceaușescu was overthrown in December 1989 and on 2 May 1990, the General Staff changed the name and classification of the ship to destroyer (distrugător) Timișoara, after the city where the first protests of the 1989 Romanian Revolution took place. She was renamed as Mărășești on 27 August 1990, after a World War II destroyer NMS Mărășești, which in turn was named after Mărășești, the site of a Romanian victory in World War I.

The feasibility of maintaining the ship after the end of the Cold War was considered, Romania even offered the ship for sale in February 1993. In September 1993, she participated in fleet maneuvers, conducting the first missile firing of the P-20M system.

The ship participated in numerous fleet maneuvers in the Black Sea. In 1994, it took part for the first time in "Maritime Partner" exercises together with ships of NATO countries. She also sailed on cruises to the Mediterranean Sea, such as in 1994, twice in 1995 and in March 1998. In 1998, she participated in the Strong Resolve 1998 exercise thus becoming the first warship of the Romanian Navy to sail in the Atlantic Ocean since the Second World War. During this mission, an IAR 316B of the 59th Helicopter Group Tuzla (Grupului 59 Elicoptere Tuzla) was also embarked on the ship. The instability of the ship combined with adverse weather conditions, however, only allowed for two flights over the Mediterranean and one over the Atlantic. Nevertheless, these were the first Romanian helicopter flights over the Mediterranean and the Atlantic. On 1 April 2001, Mărășești was reclassified as a frigate. In 2006, she was given the NATO pennant number F111. The ship is part of the 56th Frigate Flotilla of the Romanian Naval Forces and is stationed in Constanța.

In 2007, a contract was concluded with the Danish company Terma A/S for the installation of a new computerized C-Flex combat management system with MFC 2000 operator consoles, intended to integrate the ship's existing systems.

== Bibliography ==
- Breyer, Siegfried (1996). "Flagowiec Nicolae Ceausescu". Okręty Wojenne (in Polish). Vol. 16/1996. Tarnowskie Góry. pp. 44–46. ISSN 1231-014X.
- Ciślak, Jarosław (1995). Polska Marynarka Wojenna 1995: okręty, samoloty i śmigłowce, uzbrojenie, organizacja (in Polish). Warsaw: Lampart i Bellona. ISBN 83-86776-08-0.
- Grotnik, Tomasz (July 2007). "Mărăşeşti. Stara fregata w nowej roli". Nowa Technika Wojskowa (in Polish). Vol. 10/2007. Magnum-X. pp. 76–82. ISSN 1230-1655.
- Petlevanny, M. B. (2009). Корабли стран Варшавского договора (in Russian). Saint Petersburg: Galeya Print. ISBN 978-5-8173-0127-4.
- Zabłockij, Władymir (2004). "Rumuńskie fregaty typu Tetal-II". Okręty Wojenne (in Polish). Vol. 2/2004, XIV (64 ed.). p. 73.
- Saunders, Stephen, ed. (2002). Jane's Fighting Ships 2002–2003. Jane’s Information Group Ltd. ISBN 0-7106-2432-8.
