= Romanian minesweeper Locotenent Dimitrie Nicolescu =

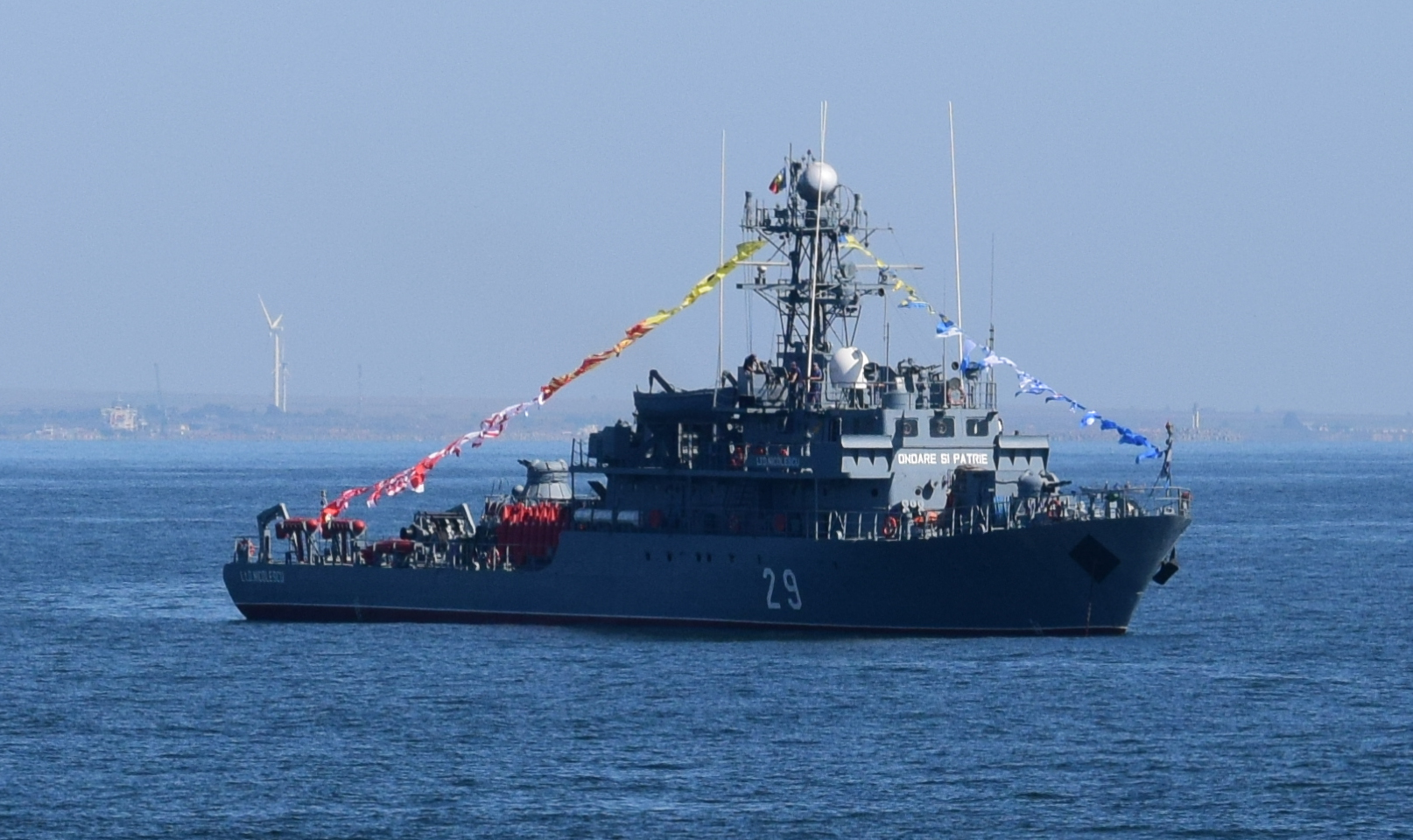
- Locotenent Dimitrie Nicolescu (DM-29) during training for the Romanian Navy day in 2018

History

Romania
- Name: Locotenent Dimitrie Nicolescu
- Namesake: Dimitrie Nicolescu
- Builder: 2 May Naval Shipyard, Mangalia
- Launched: 27 December 1988
- Commissioned: 3 June 1989
- Home port: Constanța
- Identification: Pennant number: DM-29; MMSI number: 264800068; MarineTraffic ID: 7287808; Callsign:YQXR
- Status: In active service

General characteristics
- Class & type: Musca-class minesweeper
- Displacement: 800 t (790 long tons)
- Length: 60.8 m (199 ft 6 in)
- Beam: 9.54 m (31 ft 4 in)
- Draught: 2.7 m (8 ft 10 in)
- Propulsion: 2 × ALCO V12 diesel engines, 2,400 hp (1,800 kW)
- Speed: 17 knots (31 km/h; 20 mph)
- Complement: 78
- Armament: 2 × 30 mm (1.2 in) AK-230 CIWS; 4 × quadruple MR-4N anti-aircraft machineguns; 2 × RL 1000 depth charge launchers; 2 × FAM-14 Strela-3M surface-to-air missile launchers

Locotenent Dimitrie Nicolescu (DM-29) is a Musca-class minesweeper of the Romanian Naval Forces. Built in 1988, she entered service on 3 June 1989.

== History ==
Locotenent Dimitrie Nicolescu was built at the 2 May Naval Shipyard in Mangalia, being launched on 27 December 1988. As of 2020, she was assigned to the 146th Mining-Demining Ships Divizion based in Constanța. She is tasked with carrying out research missions, the detection and destruction of naval mines in offshore areas, mining actions and anti-submarine defense, convoy escort, as well as transport of troops and materials.

The ship has participated in various NATO exercises in recent years. Following the start of the 2022 Russian invasion of Ukraine, the minesweeper started working on neutralizing drifting naval mines in the Black Sea together with another 10 Romanian ships, two IAR 330 Naval helicopters, six maritime unmanned aerial vehicles, and three detachments of EOD combat divers.

=== 8 September 2022 incident ===
On 8 September 2022, Locotenent Dimitrie Nicolescu was sent on a mission to destroy a mine reported by the ship GSP Falcon. Once it had arrived in the area and identified the mine, the hydrometeorological conditions worsened and the ship could not launch the onboard EOD diver team. Although safety measures were taken after nightfall, the mine was carried adrift by the storm and hit the aft area of the ship. The mine explosion caused a small hole on the waterline which flooded the engine compartment. After the hole was fixed and the flooding was contained, Locotenent Dimitrie Nicolescu was towed back to the port of Constanța on 9 September by the tugboats Grozavul and Vârtosul. No casualties were recorded among the 75 crew members.
