= 100 mm anti-tank gun M1977 =

A407 100mm anti-tank gun M1977
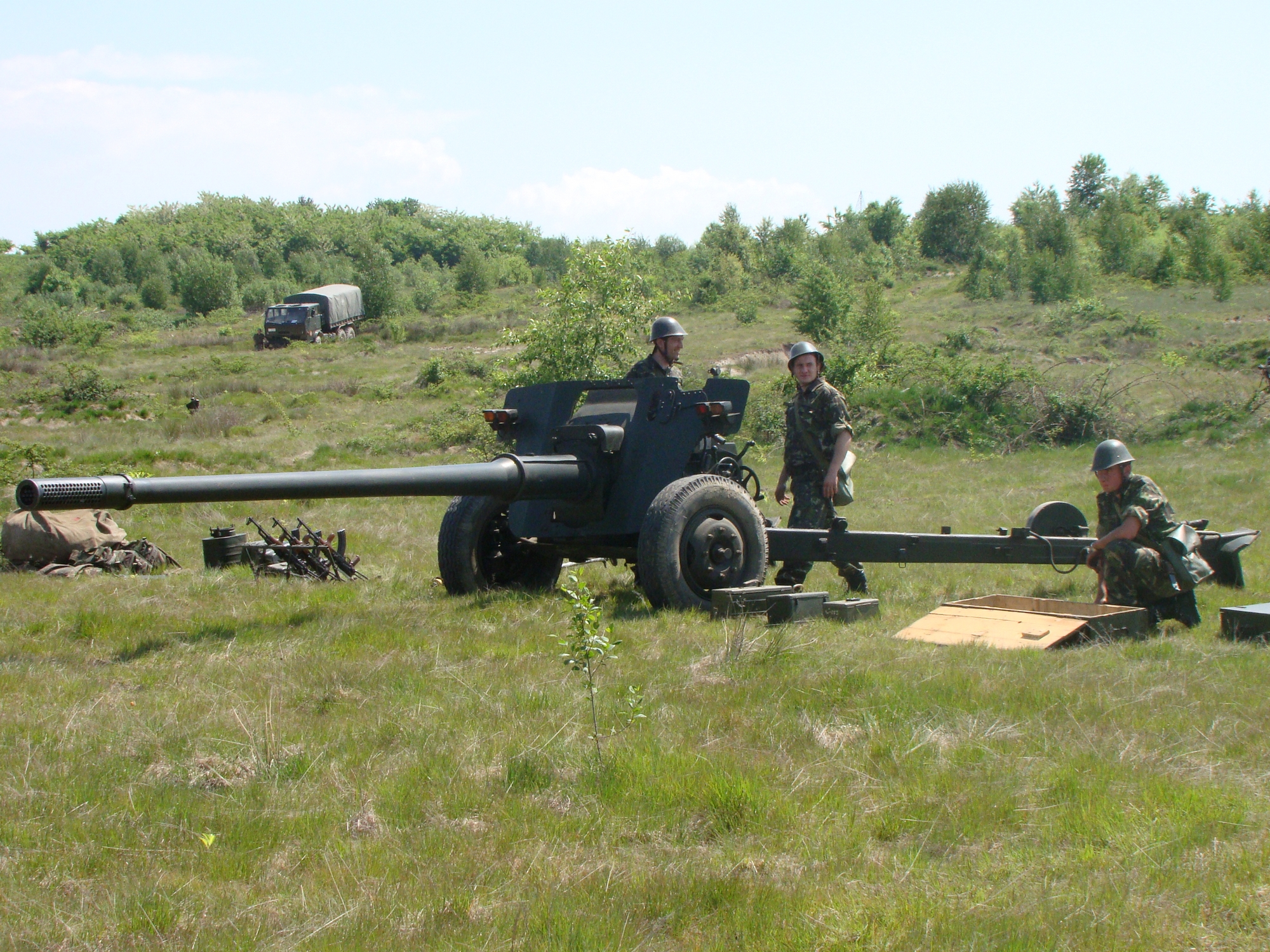
- A407 gun of the 612th Anti-tank Battalion.
- Type: Anti-tank gun
- Place of origin: Socialist Republic of Romania

Service history
- In service: 1975–present
- Wars: Gulf War

Production history
- Manufacturer: Arsenal Reşiţa

Specifications
- Mass: 3,150 kg (6,940 lb)
- Length: 9.250 m
- Barrel length: 4.630 m
- Width: 2.250 m
- Height: 1.530 m
- Crew: 8
- Shell: 100 x 695 mmR
- Caliber: 100 millimetres (3.9 in)
- Elevation: −5°/+37°
- Traverse: 27°30' left and right
- Rate of fire: 7 to 15 rounds per minute
- Muzzle velocity: 900 m/s for HE; 1400 m/s for APFSDS-T
- Effective firing range: 1.040 m for AP; 1.728 m for APFSDS-T
- Maximum firing range: 20.600 m (HE); 4.000 m (AP); 3.000 m (HEAT)
- Sights: mechanical sight, panoramic sight, optical sight, collimator

The A407 100mm anti-tank gun M1977 is a Romanian rifled 100-mm anti-tank gun which serves as the main towed anti-tank gun of the Romanian Land Forces from 1975 until present. Versions of the M1977 gun were installed on main battle tanks (TR-77 and TR-85) and ship turrets on river monitors.

== History ==
The A407 100mm anti-tank gun was the first artillery piece designed in Romania after World War II. The first variant of the gun, the M1975 (M stands for Model) had a semi-automatic horizontal sliding wedge type breech lock. The second variant, M1977, had a more practical vertical sliding wedge breech block.

The M1977 can be also used as a field gun at brigade level, as it has a maximum range of 20.6 kilometers. After 1992, the M1977 anti-tank guns were modernized with improved optical sights. The gun can be towed with the DAC 665T truck and has a maximum road speed of 60 km/h on road and 30 km/h off-road.

== Variants ==
- M1975 - used the horizontal sliding wedge breech lock.
- M1977 - used the vertical sliding wedge breech lock.
- M2002 - modernized version of M1977 with a FCS TAT-100.

Adaptations:

- A 308 - tank gun used for TR-77 and TR-85 main battle tanks.
- A 430 - 100 mm gun used for ship turrets.

== Operators ==
- Iraq
- Israel − One was delivered in 1993.
- North Korea
- Romania − 208 M1977 towed anti-tank guns in 2010.

== See also ==
- T-12 antitank gun
- D-10 tank gun
- 100 mm field gun M1944 (BS-3)
