= Submarine warfare in the Black Sea campaigns =

Submarine warfare in the Black Sea campaigns is described in the following articles:

- Submarine warfare in the Black Sea campaigns (1941)
- Submarine warfare in the Black Sea campaigns (1942)
- Submarine warfare in the Black Sea campaigns (1943)
- Submarine warfare in the Black Sea campaigns (1944)

== See also ==
- Black Sea campaigns (1941–1944)
- Black Sea campaign, other military campaigns in the Black Sea
