= List of battles of the Romanian Navy =

The following is a list of battles of the Romanian Navy, from the Romanian War of Independence to the Second World War.

== Romanian War of Independence ==
- Action off Măcin (25-26 May 1877) – Romanian-Russian victory

== Potemkin mutiny ==
- Action of 2 July 1905 - Romanian victory; Russian torpedo boat Ismail repulsed by two shells fired by the Romanian cruiser Elisabeta

== Second Balkan War ==
- Romanian landings in Bulgaria (14-15 July 1913) – Romanian victory

== World War I ==
- Raid on Ruse (27 August 1916) - Romanian victory

== World War II ==
Name	Allies	Date	Opposing force	Location	Outcome	Notes
Raid on Constanța	Germany	26 June 1941	Soviet Union	Constanta	Victory	Surface battle
Action of 26 June 1941	-	26 June 1941	Soviet Union	Ceatalchioi	Victory	Surface battle
Action of 9 July 1941	-	9 July 1941	Soviet Union	Mangalia	Victory	Anti-submarine operation
Battle of Jibrieni	-	17 December 1941	Soviet Union	Jibrieni	Victory	Anti-submarine operation
Submarine campaigns in 1941	Germany	1941	Soviet Union	Black Sea	Indecisive	Submarine and Anti-submarine operation
Battle of Cape Burnas	Germany	1 October 1942	Soviet Union	Cape Burnas	Victory	Anti-submarine operation
Submarine campaigns in 1942	Germany	1942	Soviet Union	Black Sea	Indecisive	Submarine and Anti-submarine operation
Soviet Naval raids	Germany	1941-1942	Soviet Union	Western Black Sea	Victory	Surface battles
Submarine campaigns in 1943	Germany	1943	Soviet Union	Black Sea	Indecisive	Submarine and Anti-submarine operation
Submarine campaigns in 1944	Germany	1944	Soviet Union	Black Sea	Indecisive	Submarine and Anti-submarine operation
Evacuation of Crimea	Germany	8 April - 12 May 1944	Soviet Union	Crimea	Successful Evacuation	Evacuation
