= Submarine warfare in the Black Sea campaigns (1944) =

WWII naval attacks on shipping

Submarine warfare in the Black Sea in World War II
- Part of the Black Sea Campaigns of the Eastern Front of World War II
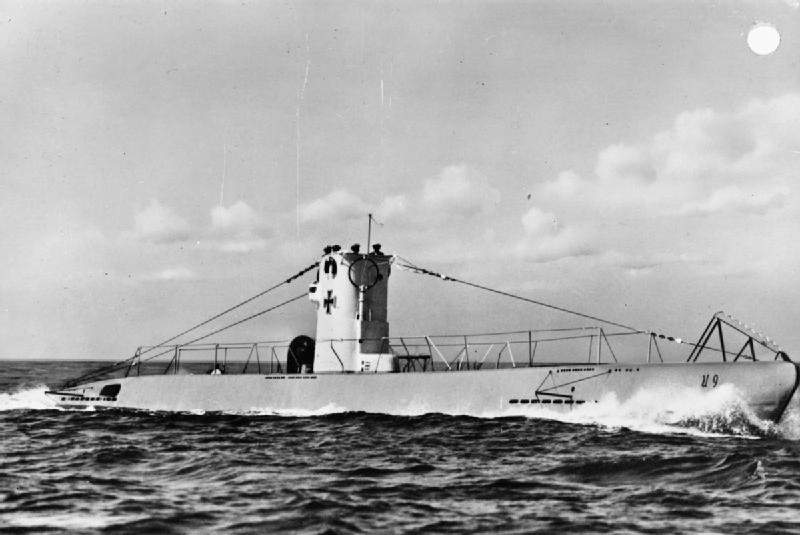
- U-9 in 1936, the submarine was the only direct U-boat loss by Soviet attack on Black Sea
Date	1944
Location	Western and Eastern Black Sea
Result	Allied victory

Belligerents
Germany; Romania (until 23 Aug. 1944)	Soviet Union; Romania (from 23 Aug. 1944)

Strength
6 German U-boats; 2 Romanian submarines Anti-submarine forces	16 submarines Anti-submarine forces

Casualties and losses
1 submarine sunk 5 submarines scuttled 1 transport sunk 1 tanker damaged 1 Bulgarian vessel sunk	3 submarines lost 1 torpedo boat damaged 1 minesweeper sunk 1 patrol boat sunk, 1 damaged 1 landing craft sunk 1 tanker sunk 2 barges sunk 1 tug sunk 1 passenger ship sunk 1 Romanian tanker sunk
- 1 neutral Turkish vessel sunk 1 refugee ship sunk

Submarine warfare in the Black Sea in World War II during 1944 involved engagements between submarines of the Soviet Black Sea Fleet attacking Axis merchantmen, defended by Romanian and German naval warships, as well as German U-boats and Romanian submarines attacking Soviet merchants on the eastern Black Sea. Before the conclusion of the campaign, Romania joined the Allies after King Michael's Coup. These engagements were a part of the naval Black Sea campaigns.

== Background ==
As during the first 1941 campaign, the 1942 campaign and the 1943 campaign, the Soviet Navy sent submarines against the Axis supply lines along the western coast of the Black Sea: at the beginning of the year however the Soviet Navy possessed only 16 operative submarines. German U-boats of the 30th U-boat Flotilla operated on the eastern sites of Black Sea, attacking Soviet targets. The Romanian Navy employed the newly built submarines NMS Marsuinul and NMS Rechinul but without scoring success. It also inherited five CB-class midget submarines left by Italy, however only two of them were operable by July 1944 and were not used in offensive action.

== Engagements ==
- On 16 January, U-20 torpedoed and sunk the Soviet tanker "Vaijan Kutur’e" (7602 GRT) off Cape Anakria. After the war, the tanker was raised on 6 October 1945, to return in service only in 1954 until 1975.
- On 17 January, Soviet submarine L-23 was sunk by German submarine chaser UJ-106.
- On 17 February, Soviet submarine ShCh-216 was sunk by German submarine chasers UJ-103 and UJ-106.
- On 31 March, German submarine U-9 was attacked in Fedosia harbor by 18 Il-2 attack aircraft, suffering damage from strafing fire and bomb explosions. The submarine commander operated the 20mm AA gun himself and was wounded in the process. Two aircraft were claimed as hit by gunners.
- On 5 April, German submarine U-23 was attacked by two Soviet patrol boats. The Germans believed to have sunk one of the attackers during the resulting surface battle but Patrol Boat SKA-099 was only damaged.
- On 7 April, the Soviet barge "Rion" (187 GRT) sunk due to a mine laid by German submarine U-20 off Poti on 27 February.
- On 18 April, the Soviet submarine L-6 was sunk by convoy escorts after a failed attack on the Romanian merchant "Alba Julia" (5700 BRT). Romanian sources claim the submarine was sunk by the Romanian gunboat NMS Sublocotenent Ghiculescu aided by the German submarine chaser UJ-104, while other sources indicate the German vessel as solely responsible for the sinking.
- On 25 April, German submarine U-18 endured a friendly-fire attack from a German BV-138 flying boat, suffering minor damage.
- On 11 May, German submarine U-9 suffered minor damage due to depth charges from a Soviet escort vessel off Yalta. On the same day the submarine attacked a Soviet convoy, scoring a torpedo hit on the Soviet torpedo boat Shtorm. The later was not sunk but damaged and had to be towed in port. On the same day, Soviet submarine L-4 torpedoed and damaged the German tanker "Friederike" (7327 GRT) off Costanta.
- Between 11 and 12 May, Romanian submarine NMS Marsuinul suffered extensive friendly-fire attacks from German and Croat Anti-submarine forces, before heading to Soviet waters to attempt attacking ship traffic. While suffering no damage, multiple Soviet attacks with depth-charges and aircraft forced the submarine to sail back without any offensive actions.

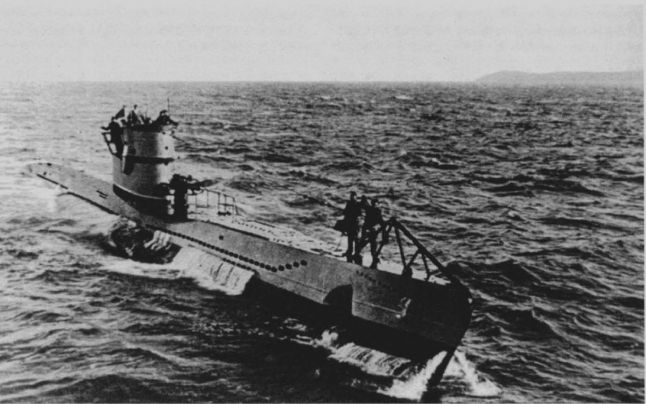
Marsuinul at sea

- On 12 May, German submarine U-24 torpedoed and sunk Soviet patrol boat SKA-0367 off Poti. On the same day, Soviet submarine A-4 finished with torpedo the already damaged (by air attack) German transport German "Geiserich" (712 GRT) south-west of the Crimea.
- On 27 May, German submarine U-24 fought a surface battle with two Soviet patrol boats off Poti, suffering 1 man killed and two wounded.
- On 29 May, German submarine U-23 torpedoed and sunk the Soviet tug "Smelyj" (71 tons) off Babushery.
- On 19 June, German submarine U-20 torpedoed and sunk the unescorted Soviet passenger ship "Pestel'" (1850 GRT). Soviets claimed the vessel was sunk within the territorial waters of Turkey while the escort was waiting to meet her.
- On 27 June, German submarine U-20 sunk the Soviet landing craft DB-26 with gunfire and demolition charges.
- On the same day, Romanian submarine NMS Rechinul suffered minor damage after depth charges were launched by Soviet submarine chasers. Other attacks during this second (and last) mission of the submarine caused no damage but prevented her to achieve victories.
- On 27 June, German submarine U-19 torpedoed and sunk the Soviet barge "Barzha" (No 75) (app. 1000 tons) off Tuapse. The barge was empty and towed alongside another one by Soviet tug Verzhilov while under escort of patrol boats and flying boats.
- On 20 July, Soviet submarine ShCh-209 sunk the Turkish sailing vessel "Semsi Bahri" (26 GRT) with gunfire off Bosporus.
- On 5 August, Soviet submarine ShCh-215 sunk the refugee ship Mefkure (52 GRT) with gunfire and torpedoes, killing 305 Jewish refugees. There were only 11 survivors. The ship had been part of an escorted convoy and Soviets believed she was carrying soldiers.
- On 20 August, Soviet aircraft accomplished a large raid inside Costanza harbor, sinking U-9 and heavily damaging U-18 and U-24 (both were unable to sail as consequence of the damage and were scuttled to prevent capture when Romania joined the Allies).
- On 24 August, Soviet submarine ShCh-215 torpedoed and sunk the Bulgarian sailing vessel "Vita" (180 GRT) off Cape Emine.

== Engagements after Romania joined the Allies ==
- On 1 September, German submarine U-23 fired three torpedoes into the harbour of Costanza. While a Romanian destroyer was claimed as hit, in reality the only damage was suffered by Romanian tanker Oituz (2,686 GRT), which sank at her moorings. The vessel was later refloated and declared a total loss.
- On 2 September, the Soviet Fugas-class minesweeper T-410 Vzryv was sailing alongside the Romanian Admiral Murgescu off Costanca when she was torpedoed and sunk by German submarine U-19, being the last Soviet vessel sunk by a U-boat in the Black Sea. The Soviets accused the Romanian Navy (by the time allies) of complicity with the enemy because the Romanian minelayer was not attacked. This was later cited as justification for the seizure of the Romanian fleet.
- On 11 September, after running out of fuel and with no harbor open to them, the crews of U-19, U-20 and U-23 scuttled their boats off Turkey, ending the German naval presence in the Black Sea.

== Outcome ==
The German anti-submarine capabilities in 1944 effectively neutralized the threat of Soviet submarines in the Black Sea. On the other hand, a combination of heavy Soviet anti-submarine actions prevented the 2 newly built Romanian submarines to achieve successes, while the 30th U-boat Flotilla was effectively eliminated by the combined effect of an air raid on Costanta on 20 August and the following King Michael's Coup (negating the survived U-boats a safe harbor and forcing their scuttling).

== See also ==
- Black Sea campaigns (1941–1944)
- Submarine warfare in the Black Sea campaigns (1941)
- Submarine warfare in the Black Sea campaigns (1942)
- Submarine warfare in the Black Sea campaigns (1943)
