= Battle of Jibrieni =

- Part of the Black Sea Campaigns of the Eastern Front of World War II
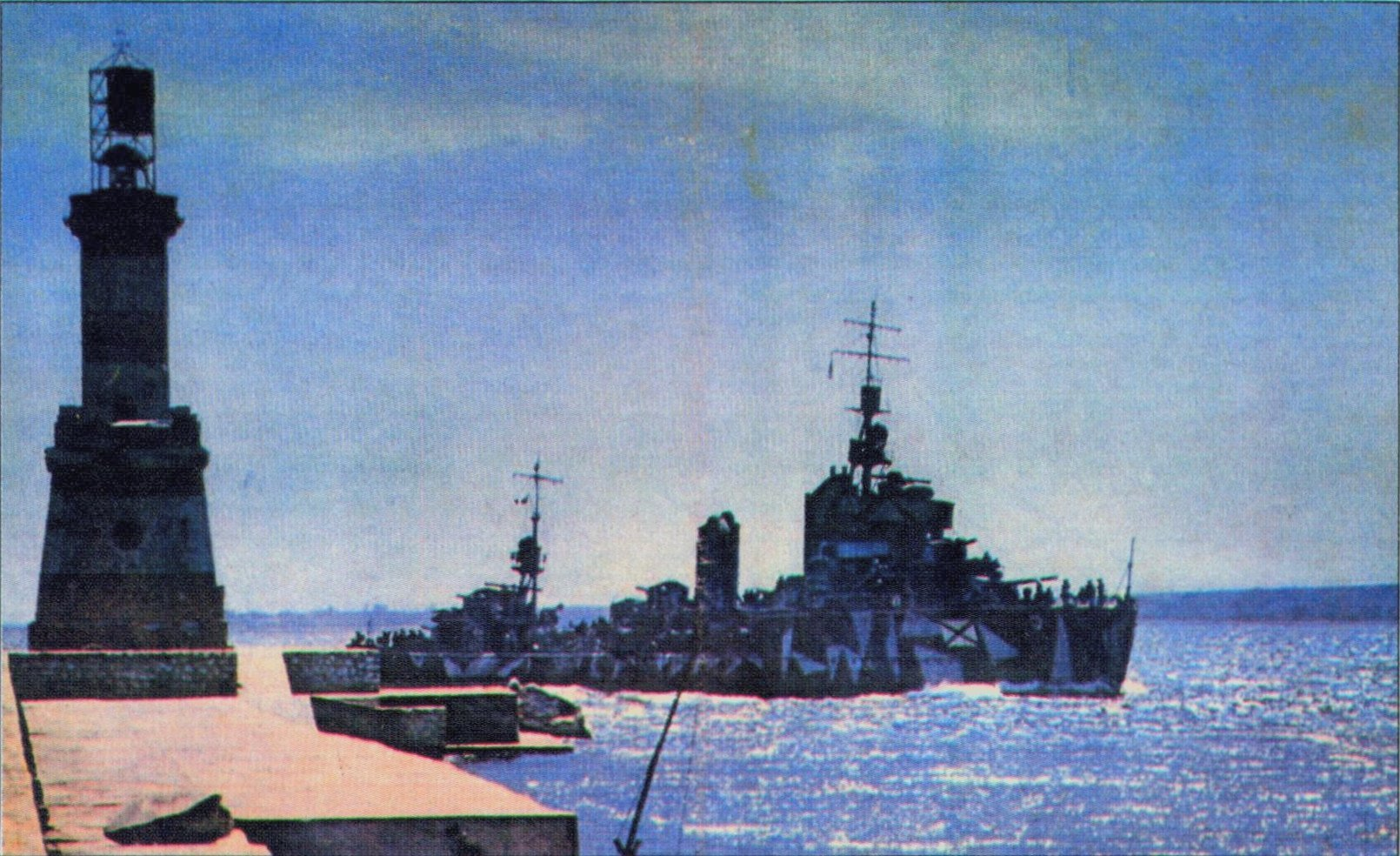
- Romanian destroyer Regele Ferdinand
Date	17 December 1941
Location	Jibrieni, Romania
Result	Axis victory

Belligerents
Romania; Cargo ships: Hungary; Bulgaria	Soviet Union

Strength
Escort force: 2 destroyers 2 torpedo boats 2 gunboats Convoy: 3 cargo ships	1 submarine

Casualties and losses
None	1 submarine sunk 16–19 killed

The Battle of Jibrieni was an attack on 17 December 1941 by a Soviet submarine on an Axis convoy and its Romanian escorts off the coast of the Romanian village of Jibrieni (today Prymorske, Ukraine). The engagement ended with the sinking of the attacking Soviet submarine M-59.

== Battle ==
On 17 December 1941, the Soviet M-class submarine M-59 carried out an attack against an Axis convoy near the coastal town of Jibrieni in December 1941. The convoy consisted of the Hungarian cargo ships Kassa and Kolozsvár and the Bulgarian cargo ship Tzar Ferdinand. The three ships were escorted by the Romanian destroyers Regele Ferdinand and Regina Maria, the Romanian gunboats Stihi and Ghiculescu and the Romanian torpedo boats Sborul and Smeul. The two torpedoes launched by the Soviet submarine missed the aft and bow of the Romanian destroyer by about 30 feet (9.1 m) each. With 25 knots (46.3 km/h), Regele Ferdinand rushed to the place the torpedoes were launched from and dropped three series of depth charges. Between the second and third series, fuel and bubbles emerged from the water. Regele Ferdinand subsequently circled the area and dropped four more depth charges, followed by more fuel emerging from the depths as well as pieces of wood. Regele Ferdinand reported the sinking of the submarine, which was confirmed by the Romanian Naval Command. Post-war sources revealed the identity of the submarine as M-59.

== Disputed account ==
According to modern Russian sources, M-59 was probably lost several weeks prior in minefields east of Constanța, in late October or early November before the battle took place. Soviet archival documents state that the submarine did not have enough fuel to operate beyond 8 December on its final patrol, thus making impossible for the submarine to be involved in the engagement on 17 December. The likely reason of M-59's loss was defensive field of mines east of Constanța, the field responsible being the one laid by the Romanian minelayers Admiral Murgescu, Dacia and Regele Carol I.

== See also ==
- Submarine warfare in the Black Sea campaigns (1941)
- List of battles of the Romanian Navy
- Action of 6 December 1941
- Action of 9 July 1941
- Battle of Cape Burnas
