= Submarine warfare in the Black Sea campaigns (1942) =

Submarine warfare in the Black Sea in World War II
- Part of the Black Sea Campaigns of the Eastern Front of World War II
| Date | 1942 |
| Location | Western Black Sea coast |
| Result | Inconclusive |

Belligerents
| Romania; Germany; Italy | Soviet Union |

Strength
| 6 German U-boats; 6 Italian midget-submarines 1 Romanian submarine Anti-submarine forces | 34 submarines Anti-submarine forces |

Casualties and losses
| 1 Italian midget-submarine lost 1 German cargo sunk 1 German tanker scuttled, 1 damaged 1 German tug sunk 2 Romanian cargo sunk and 1 damaged 1 Romanian tug sunk | 9 submarines sunk (4 more lost in Sevastopol operations) |
- 8 neutral Turkish vessels lost 1 refugee ship sunk

Submarine warfare in the Black Sea in World War II during 1942 involved engagements between primarily submarines of the Soviet Black Sea Fleet attacking Axis merchantmen defended by Romanian and German naval warships. These engagements were a part of the Black Sea campaigns between Axis and Soviet naval forces.

== Background ==
As during the first 1941 campaign, the Soviet Navy sent submarines against the Axis supply lines along the western coast of the Black Sea. A number of neutral Turkish vessels were also attacked near the Bosporus area, resulting in the Struma disaster. Once again, Axis defenses primarily consisted of Romanian-laid fields of mines: 5000 mines were laid (both anti-submarine and floating), the Soviet Navy possessed 34 submarines including 14 of new construction but only 20 were operational ready. German U-boats began operating in the Black Sea during late 1942, without scoring any hits while the Romanian submarine Delfinul departed for her final patrols.

== Sevastopol operations ==
A separate action was accomplished (alongside other Soviet Navy units) to supply and later evacuate troops from the Siege of Sevastopol. While carrying away men from the besieged city, Soviet submarine ShCh-214 was torpedoed and sunk in surface action by Italian MAS boats on 19 June. A second loss occurred on 26 June when Soviet submarine "S-32" was sunk, most likely by German bombers (while Italian midget-submarines CB-3 and CB-4 also take credit of this victory but their attacks did not matched with S-32's last mission). With the Axis finally victorious in Sevastopol, the Soviet Navy scuttled submarines "D-6" and "A-1" to avoid their capture.

== Engagements ==
- On 1 January, the Soviet submarine ShCh-214 shelled and sunk the Turkish sailing vessel "Koraltepe " (209GRT) off Cape Igneada.
- On 23 February, the Soviet submarine ShCh-213 shelled and sunk the Turkish sailing vessel "Kankaya" (464 GRT) off the Bosporus.
- On 24 February, the Soviet submarine ShCh-213 torpedoed and sunk the Panama-flagged Bulgarian merchant "Struma" carrying Jewish refugees onboard.
- After 12 March, the Soviet submarine "ShCh-210" was lost, most likely on Romanian mines from field "S-15".
- On 18 May, the Soviet submarine "ShCh-205" shelled and sunk the Turkish merchant Duatepe (128 GRT) south-east of Burgas.
- On 23 May, the Soviet submarine "ShCh-205" torpedoed and sunk the Turkish merchant Safak (682 GRT) off the southern Bulgarian coast.
- On 29 May, the Soviet submarine "A-3" torpedoed and sunk Romanian merchant "Sulina" (3495 GRT) off Odessa.
- On the same day, the Soviet submarine ShCh-214 rammed and sunk the Turkish sailing vessel "Hudavendigar" (90 GRT) off Cape Igneada.
- On 31 May, the Soviet submarine ShCh-214 shelled and sunk the Turkish sailing vessel "Mahbubdihan" (85 GRT) off Cape Igneada.
- On 2 June, the Soviet submarine ShCh-214 rammed and sunk the Turkish sailing vessel "Kaynarea" off the Bulgarian coast.
- On 11 June, the Soviet submarine "A-5" torpedoed and damaged the Romanian merchant "Ardeal" (5695 GRT) off Odessa, the ship having to be beached to prevent sinking. During the same attack, the German tug "Romulus" was attacked but missed.
- On 13 June, the Italian midget-submarine "CB-5" was sunk in the Yalta harbor by a Soviet motor torpedo boat surface attack.
- On 27 June, the Romanian submarine Delfinul suffered heavy attacks during her last patrol off Yalta, with minor damages due to depth charges and later bullet hits from an aircraft attack on the conning tower during the following day. More attacks were suffered during the rest of the patrol but without further damages. After the patrol, Delfinul was placed on refit and did not saw further action in war.
- On 6 August, the Soviet submarine L-5 laid mines off Crimea: it is possible that German landing craft F-473 sunk on 17 February 1943 on that minefield.
- After 23 August, the Soviet submarine "ShCh-208" was lost likely on mines off the Bulgarian/Romanian coast.
- On 23 August, the Soviet submarine "M-36" torpedoed and sunk the German tug "Ankara" (112 GRT) off Odessa.
- Between 22 and 25 August, the Soviet submarine "M-33" was lost on mines off Odessa.
- Between 23 and 30 September, the Soviet submarine "M-60" was lost on mines off Odessa.
- On 1 October, near Cape Burnas, the Soviet M-class submarine M-118 attacked and sank the German transport ship Salzburg, which was carrying on board 2,000 Soviet prisoners of war. After attacking, the submarine was located by a German BV 138C flying boat and the Romanian gunboats Sublocotenent Ghiculescu and Stihi Eugen were sent to the scene. The two Romanian warships attacked the Soviet submarine with depth-charges, sinking her with all hands onboard. After several expeditions failed to find the wreck on the alleged point of sinking, modern evaluations raise the possibility M-118 was sunk 25 km from the depth charges' attack, due German BV 138 seaplane action.
- On 4 October, the Soviet submarine L-23 laid a field of mines close Fedosia: on 15 June 1943 the German landing craft F-121 sunk on these mines.
- On 6 October, the Soviet submarine "M-31" torpedoed and sunk the Romanian tug "Mina Daniel" north-east of Sulina. The vessel was also reported with the name "Oltul", and described as a submarine chaser.
- On 10 or 11 October, the Romanian cargo ship Carpați was torpedoed and sunk near Sulina by the Soviet submarine Shch-216.
- On 14 October, the Soviet submarine M-32 unsuccessfully attacked the Romanian destroyer Regele Ferdinand near Cape Burnas, the submarine being subsequently depth charged and damaged by the Romanian torpedo boat Smeul.
- On 14 October, the Soviet submarine ShCh-213 was reported as sunk by German submarine chaser UJ-116 "Xanten" but recent discovery of the wreck indicate the probable cause of sinking as Romanian-laid mines.
- On 21 October, the Soviet submarine M-35 torpedoed and heavily damaged the German tanker Le Progress near the Crimean coast, the ship being subsequently scuttled.
- On 5 November, the German submarine U-24 engaged the Soviet minesweeper T-492 with artillery and torpedoes off Poti. The first torpedo missed, while a second one hit but was a dud. After midnight (6 November) a third torpedo missed and the submarine surfaced: the resulting exchange of fire caused light machine-gun damage to the submarine which could inflicted none due to a malfunction of its 20mm AA gun.
- On 14 November, the Soviet submarine L-23 attacked a convoy consisting of the Romanian destroyers Regele Ferdinand and Regina Maria and the German tanker Ossag near the Bosphorus. The submarine launched three torpedoes which struck and damaged Ossag.
- On 29 November, the German submarine U-24 was spotted by Turkish coastal artillery and the submarine was forced to dive after shelling from coast.
- On 8 December, the Soviet Dekabrist-class submarine D-5 attacked and sank the Turkish sailing vessel Kociboglu near the Bosphorus.
- On 11 December, Shch-212 was sunk by a Romanian minefield near Snake Island, along with all of her crew of 44. In mid-December, M-31 was possibly sunk by one of the Romanian minefields near the island as well. The two minefields protecting the island were laid on 29–30 October and 5 November 1942 by the minelayers Amiral Murgescu and Dacia, together with the Romanian destroyers Regina Maria and Regele Ferdinand, the flotilla leader Mărăști, the gunboat Stihi Eugen and four German R-boats.
- On 26 December, the Soviet submarine L-6 unsuccessfully attacked a Romanian supply convoy, the convoy escorts lightly damaging her with depth charges in return.
- On 27 December, the German submarine U-9 was attacked by Soviet minesweeper with 8 depth charges off Sochi, suffering minor damage.
- Between 15 and 29 December, the Soviet submarine "L-24" sunk in a Bulgarian minefield off Cape Shabla.

== Outcome ==
German U-boats of the 30th U-boat Flotilla failed to sink or damage enemy target during this first year of operations in Black Sea, while Delfinul departed for her last ineffective patrols. Soviet submarines have been extimated to have sunk 13 targets in the Black Sea (13,000 GRT) but only 6 of them directly supporting Axis operations on the Crimea. Other sources raise the total number to 17 targets sunk (but with less tonnage: 12,900 GRT).

== See also ==
- Black Sea campaigns (1941-1944)
- Submarine warfare in the Black Sea campaigns (1941)
- Submarine warfare in the Black Sea campaigns (1943)
- Submarine warfare in the Black Sea campaigns (1944)
