= NMS Năluca =

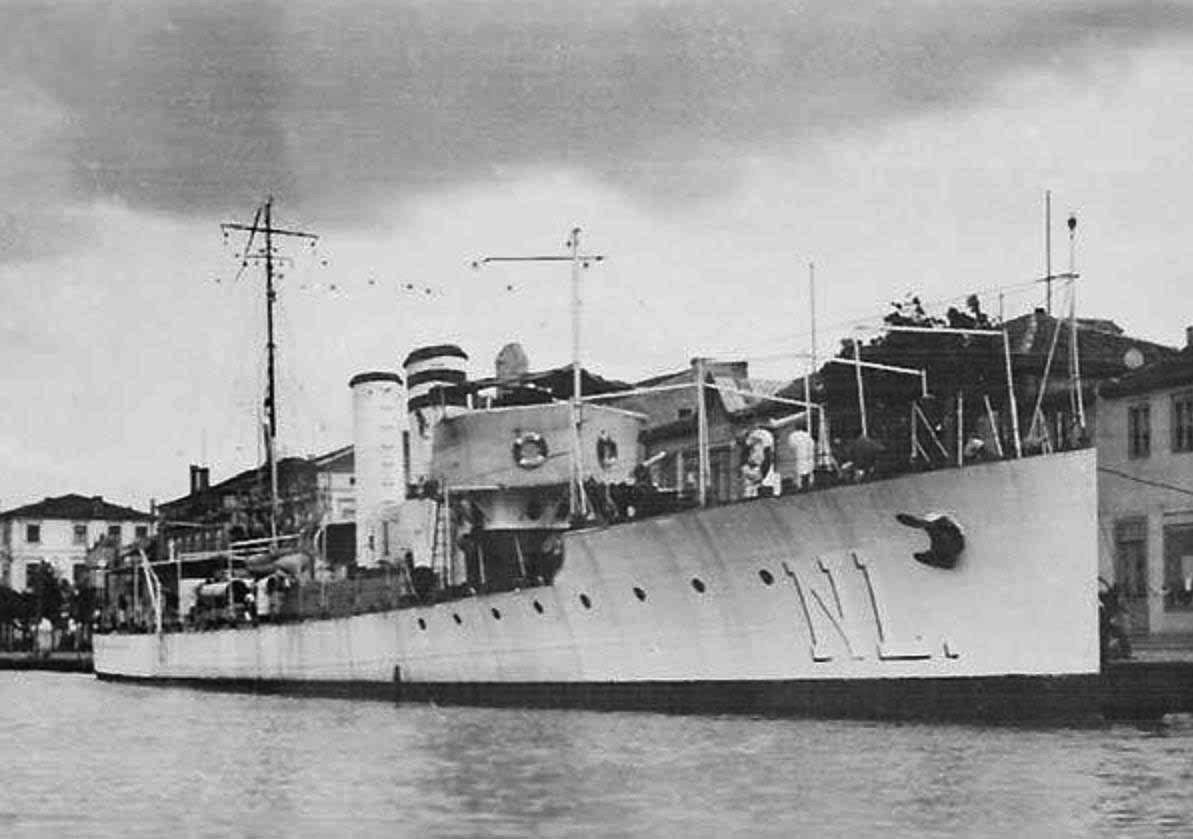

History

Austria-Hungary
- Name: Tb 82F
- Builder: Ganz & Danubius, Fiume
- Laid down: 30 October 1913
- Launched: 11 August 1914
- Commissioned: 16 August 1916
- Fate: Given to Romania as reparations, 1920

Romania
- Name: Năluca
- Namesake: The Romanian word for ghost
- Commissioned: 1920
- Fate: Sunk by Soviet aircraft, 20 August 1944

General characteristics
- Class & type: 250t-class torpedo boat
- Displacement: 266 long tons (270 t) (standard); 330 long tons (340 t) (full load)
- Length: 58.5 m (191 ft 11 in)
- Beam: 5.8 m (19 ft 0 in)
- Draft: 1.5 m (4 ft 11 in)
- Installed power: 5,000 shp (3,700 kW)
- Propulsion: 1 oil-burning & 1 coal-burning Yarrow boilers; 2 AEG turbines; 2 shafts
- Speed: 28 knots (32 mph; 52 km/h)
- Range: 1,200 nautical miles (2,200 km) at 16 knots (18 mph; 30 km/h)
- Complement: 38
- Armament: World War I: 2 × Škoda 66 mm (2.6 in) naval guns; 4 × 450 mm (18 in) torpedo tubes; World War II: 2 × 66 mm Škoda naval guns; 2 × 20 mm Oerlikon AA guns; 1 × 400 mm depth charge thrower

NMS Năluca was a torpedo boat of the Royal Romanian Navy. She was commissioned in 1920, after initially serving as Tb 82 F in the Austro-Hungarian Navy during World War I. She and six more sister ships were awarded to Romania as reparations after the war ended.

== Construction and specifications ==
A vessel of the F-group of the 250t-class, Năluca was built by Ganz & Danubius at Fiume and nearby Porto Re, along with the rest of her group, between October 1913 and December 1916. Under the designation Tb 82 F, she was laid down at Porto Re on 30 October 1913 and launched on 11 August 1914. The Italian declaration of war against Austria in May 1915 resulted in Tb 82 F being towed to the more secure port of Pula, and she was not completed until 16 August 1916. She had a waterline length of 58.5 m (191 ft 11 in), a beam of 5.8 m (19 ft 0 in), and a normal draught of 1.5 m (4 ft 11 in). While her designed displacement was 266 tonnes (262 long tons), she displaced about 330 tonnes (320 long tons) fully loaded. The crew consisted of 38 officers and enlisted men. Her AEG-Curtiss turbines were rated at 5,000 shp (3,700 kW) with a maximum output of 6,000 shp (4,500 kW), enabling her to reach a top speed of 28 knots (52 km/h; 32 mph). She carried 20 long tons (20.3 t) of coal and 34 long tons (34.5 t) of fuel oil, which gave her a range of 1,200 nmi (2,200 km; 1,400 mi) at 16 knots (30 km/h; 18 mph). Under the provisions of the Treaty of Saint-Germain-en-Laye, she was given as reparations to Romania in 1920, along with six more boats of the same class. During World War II, she had no torpedo tubes. These were replaced by depth charges, her artillery consisting of two 66 mm naval guns and two 20 mm anti-aircraft guns. The depth charges were deployed using one 400 mm thrower.

== Career ==
=== Austro-Hungarian service ===
On the night of 28/29 November 1916, Tb 82 F, together with sister ships Tb 86 F, Tb 89 F, Tb 90 F and Tb 91 F sortied towards Valona.

On 23 March 1917, Tb 82 F was part of the 15th Torpedo-boat Group of the 9th Torpedo craft division. On 21 May 1917, the designations of Austro-Hungarian torpedo boats was revised, with the prefix letter indicating the ship's constructor being omitted, and Tb 82 F becoming Tb 82. On 19 October 1917, Tb 82 was one of a number of destroyers and torpedo boats supporting air attacks against Ancona, and on 19 November, took part in minelaying operations between Venice and Ancona with the destroyers Triglav and Reka and the torpedo boats Tb 72, Tb 86, Tb 87, Tb 89, Tb 90, Tb 91 and Tb 95. On 28 November, Tb 82 formed part of a force of six destroyers and eight torpedo boats that bombarded targets on the Italian coast between Porto Corsini (near the Port of Ravenna) and Rimini.

=== Romanian service ===
While fighting on the Axis side during World War II, she was involved in the minelaying operation of the Bulgarian coast in October 1941.

On 9 July 1941, Năluca, aided by the motor torpedo boats Viscolul and Vijelia, sank the Soviet Shchuka-class submarine Shch-206 near Mangalia.

On 28 September 1942, Năluca was unsuccessfully attacked by the Soviet M-class submarine M-120 near the Southern coast of the Crimea.

Between 26 July and 17 September 1943, Năluca carried out 12 escort missions, between Constanța and Odessa. On 27 August, during the 8th escort, her convoy was unsuccessfully attacked by seven Soviet torpedo bombers.

On 20 August 1944, Soviet aircraft carried out a large air attack on the main Romanian port of Constanța, involving 62 bombers and 80 escorting fighters and ground attack aircraft. Năluca was sunk, along with the German submarine U-9, three German motor torpedo boats and a motor minesweeper, along with many smaller vessels.

== See also ==
- Romanian Naval Forces
- Romanian Navy during World War II

== Sources ==
=== Bibliography ===
- Axworthy, Mark; Scafeș, Cornel; Craciunoiu (1995). Third Axis, Fourth Ally: Romanian Armed Forces in the European War, 1941–1945. London: Arms and Armour Press. ISBN 1-85409-267-7.
- Bertke, Donald A.; Kindell, Don; Smith, Gordon (2012). World War II sea war. 4, Germany sends Russia to the Allies : day-to-day naval actions June 1941 through November 1941. Dayton, Ohio: Bertke Publ. ISBN 9781937470036.
- Bertke, Donald A.; Kindell, Don; Smith, Gordon (2014). World War II sea war. 7, The Allies strike back : day-to-day naval actions September through November 1942. Dayton, Ohio: Bertke Publ. ISBN 9781937470111.
- Fock, Harald (1989). Z-vor! Internationale Entwicklung und Kriegseinsätze von Zerstörern und Torpedobooten, 1914 bis 1939 (in German). Herford, Germany: Koelers Verlagsgesellschaft mbH. ISBN 3-7822-0207-4.
- Gardiner, Robert; Gray, Randal, eds. (1985). Conway's All the World's Fighting Ships 1906–1921. London: Conway Maritime Press. ISBN 0-85177-245-5.
- Greger, René (1976). Austro-Hungarian Warships of World War I. London: Ian Allan. ISBN 0-7110-0623-7.
- Hervieux, Pierre (2001). "The Royal Romanian Navy at War, 1941–1944". In Preston, Antony (ed.). Warship 2001–2002. London: Conway Maritime Press. pp. 70–88. ISBN 0-85177-901-8.
- Piekałkiewicz, Janusz (1987). Sea War, 1939-1945. Harrisburg, Pennsylvania: Historical Times. ISBN 091867817X.
- Rohwer, Jürgen; Hümmelchen, Gerhard (1992). Chronology of the War at Sea 1939–1945. London: Greenhill Books. ISBN 1-85367-117-7.
- Rotaru, Jipa; Damaschin, Ioan (2000). Glorie și dramă : Marina Regală Română, 1940-1945. Bucharest: Editura "Ion Cristoiu". ISBN 9789739954471.
