= NMS Viscolul =

Torpedo boat

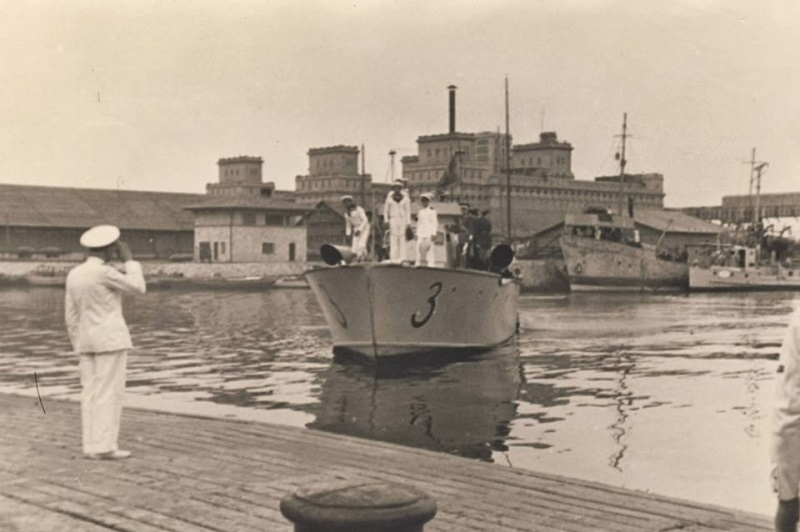
- Viscolul arriving in the port of Constanța, 1940

History

United Kingdom
- Name: MTB-23
- Builder: Vospers, Portsmouth
- Laid down: 1939
- Launched: 1939
- Completed: 1939
- Commissioned: 1939
- Out of service: 1940
- Fate: Sold to Romania

Romania
- Name: Viscolul
- Commissioned: 1940
- Out of service: 1944
- Fate: Captured by the Soviet Union

Soviet Union
- Name: TK-955
- Commissioned: 1944
- Out of service: 1945
- Fate: Returned to Romania, later scrapped

Service record
- Commanders: Ion Zaharia
- Operations: Action of 9 July 1941; Siege of Odessa
- Victories: 1 destroyer damaged; 1 submarine sunk

General characteristics
- Class & type: Vospers type motor torpedo boat
- Type: Motor torpedo boat/Escort vessel
- Displacement: 32 tons
- Length: 21.95 m (72 ft 0 in)
- Beam: 5 m (16 ft 5 in)
- Draft: 1.1 m (3 ft 7 in)
- Propulsion: 3 Isotta-Fraschini petrol engines, 2 shafts, 3,450 horse power
- Speed: 40 knots (74 km/h; 46 mph)
- Complement: 12
- Armament: 2 x quadruple 7.7 mm machine guns; 2 x 533 mm torpedo tubes; 8 depth charges or 4 mines

NMS Viscolul was the most successful and the longest-serving motor torpedo boat of the Romanian Navy during the Second World War. She supported the Siege of Odessa and took part in the action of 9 July 1941.

== Construction and specifications ==
Viscolul was a Vospers-type motor torpedo boat, one of three purchased by Romania from the United Kingdom. The three boats were originally launched and completed in 1939 as MTB-20 (Viforul), MTB-21 (Vijelia) and MTB-23 (Viscolul). They were acquired by Romania in 1940. Along with her sister ships, Viscolul had a displacement of 32 tons, measuring 21.95 m (72.0 ft) in length, with a beam of 5 m (16 ft) and a draught of 1.1 m (3 ft 7 in). She was armed with two quadruple 7.7 mm machine guns, two torpedo tubes and could carry up to eight depth charges or four mines. Power plant consisted of three Isotta Fraschini petrol engines powering two shafts, generating 3,450 hp which gave her a top speed of 40 kn (74 km/h; 46 mph). She had a crew of up to 12.

== Service ==
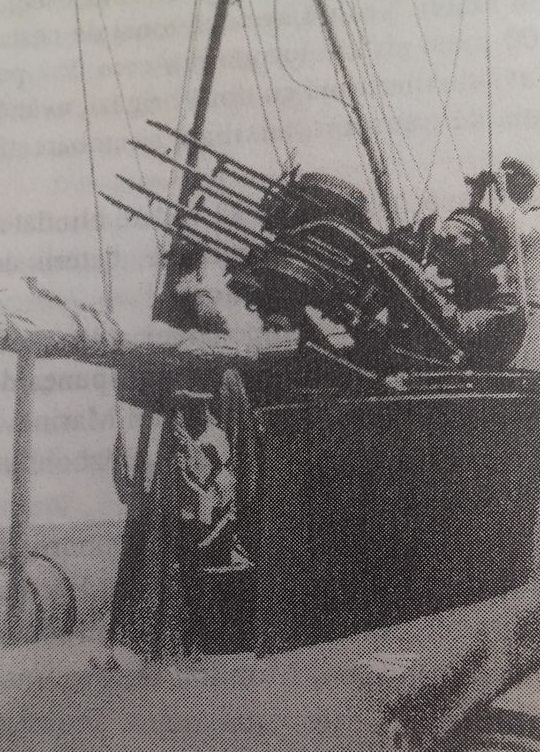
Quadruple machine gun system used aboard Viscolul and her sisters

During World War II, she was commanded by Lieutenant-Commander Ion Zaharia, who would later command the motor torpedo boat Vedenia and the entire Romanian MTB squadron, consisting of 7 boats.

On 9 July 1941, one week after Romania launched Operation München as part of Operation Barbarossa, Viscolul and Vijelia, together with the 250t-class torpedo boat Năluca, engaged an enemy submarine near Mangalia. Năluca was the first to arrive at the scene and subsequently located and engaged the Soviet Shchuka-class submarine Shch-206. In the first part of the battle, Năluca attacked the submarine with 20 mm rounds, but the latter submerged in order to escape. The Romanian torpedo boat subsequently used depth charges, being soon joined by the two motor torpedo boats. At 2:56 pm, the Soviet submarine was confirmed sunk by Viscolul, none of her crew of 38 survived.

On the night of 18 September, during the Siege of Odessa, Viscolul and Vijelia attacked a Soviet convoy south of Odessa, each boat launching her two torpedoes at the closest enemy destroyer. Three of the four torpedoes missed. The fourth torpedo struck and damaged the Soviet destroyer, but failed to detonate.

On 9 November 1941, her sisters Viforul and Vijelia were sunk near Odessa by Soviet mines.

Thus, Viscolul remained the sole MTB of the Romanian Navy for almost two years, until 7 MAS boats were acquired in August 1943. By 1944, Viscolul was fitted for escort service. In this capacity, she carried out multiple escort missions in May 1944.

Viscolul was captured by Soviet forces in September 1944 and commissioned as TK-955. She was returned 1 year later, but never commissioned again due to her bad condition.
