= MV Mefküre =

Coordinates: 42°03′N 30°20′E

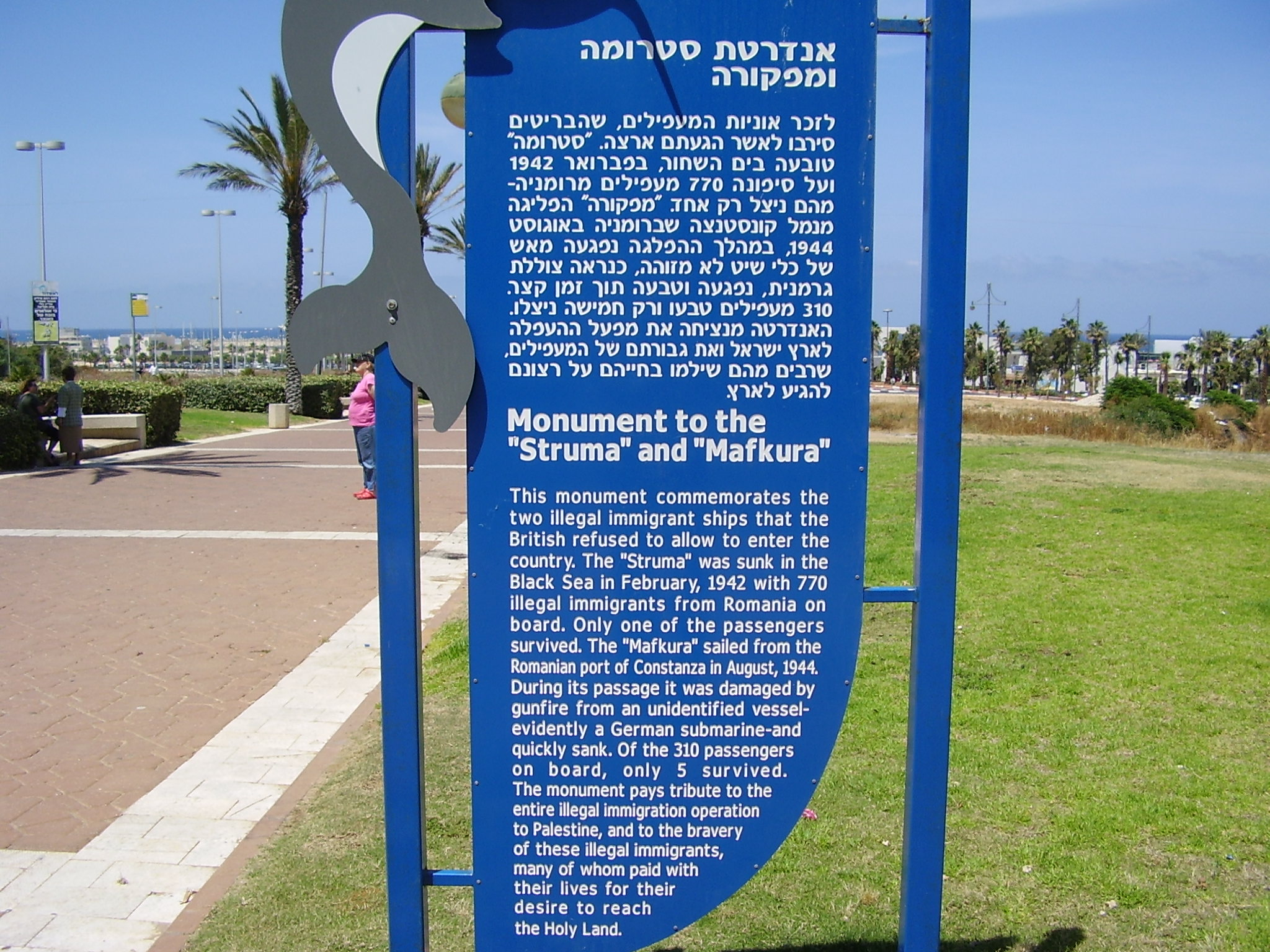
- Monument to the vessels Struma and Mefküre in Ashdod, Israel

History
- Name: MV Mefküre
- Operator: Jean D Pandelis
- Port of registry: (Turkey) Istanbul or Şile
- Launched: 1929
- Out of service: 5 August 1944
- Fate: Sunk by Soviet submarine Shch-215, 5 August 1944

General characteristics
- Type: motor schooner
- Tonnage: 52 GRT or 120 GRT; 40 NRT
- Length: 35 m (115 ft)
- Beam: 8 m (26 ft)
- Propulsion: diesel engine of about 75 BHP; single screw
- Speed: maximum 11.5 knots (21.3 km/h; 13.2 mph); cruising speed 9 knots (17 km/h; 10 mph)
- Crew: 7

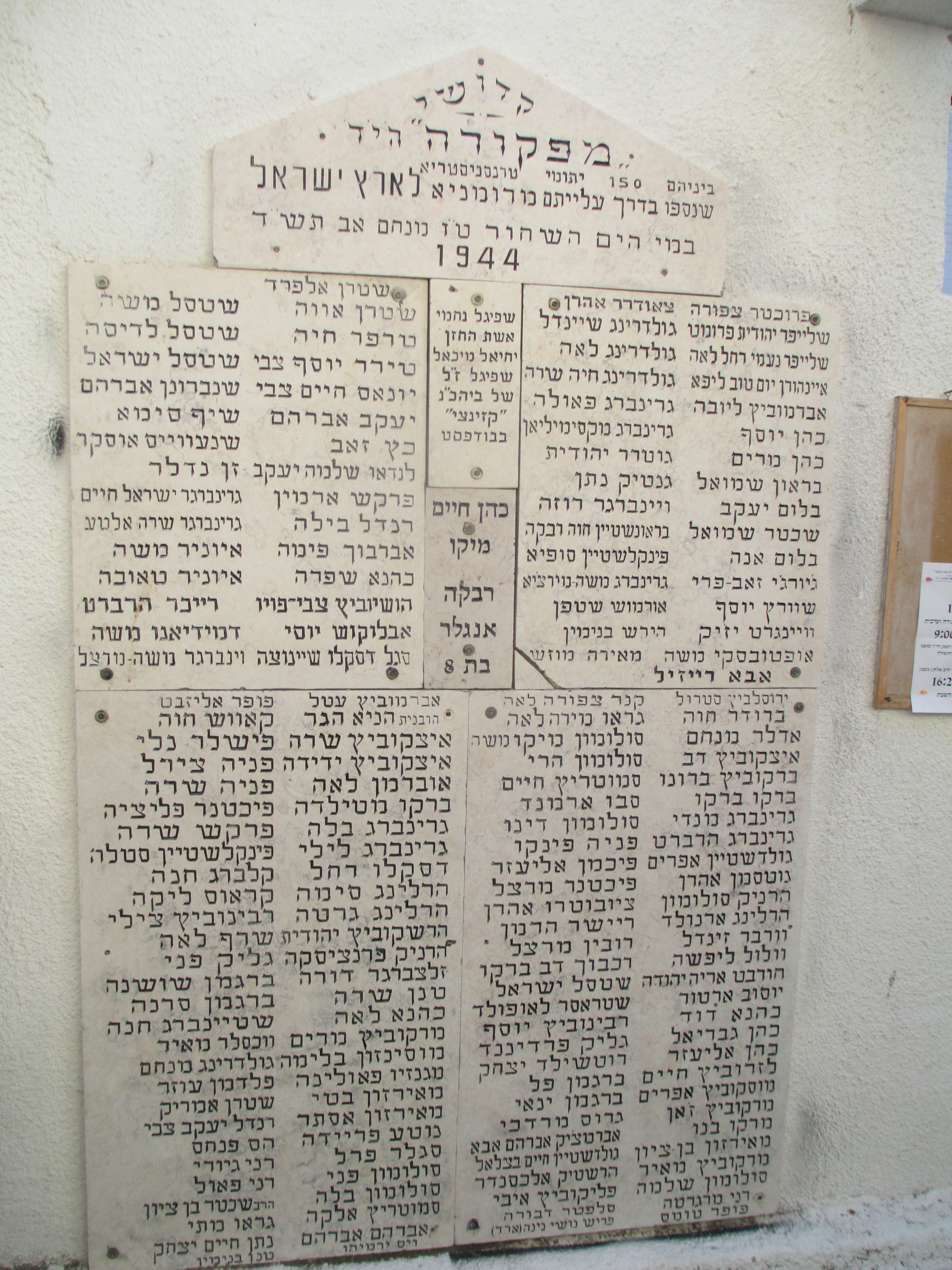
Tel Aviv memorial plaque to Mefkure victims

MV Mefküre (often referred to as Mefkura) was a Turkish wooden-hulled motor schooner chartered to carry Jewish Holocaust refugees from Romania to Istanbul, sailing under the Turkish and Red Cross flags. On 5 August 1944 a Soviet submarine sank her in the Black Sea by cannon and machine gun fire, killing more than 300 Jewish refugees.

== Final voyage and sinking ==
On 3 August 1944 three small old merchant ships, overcrowded with about 1,000 Jewish refugees, left the Romanian port of Constanța at about 20:30 hrs. Sailing instructions from the German naval authorities were for Morina with 308 passengers to sail first, followed by Bulbul with 390 people, and lastly by Mefküre with 320 refugees (the exact number may be slightly different) on board. The vessels were ordered to sail from position 43°43'N 29°08'E strictly southward, which would lead them directly into the Bosphorus. Armed ships of the Romanian Navy escorted the convoy and provided signal flags to aid their passage from the harbour and through the mined area of the approaches.

On 5 August 1944, about 40 minutes after midnight Mefküre was about 25 miles (40 km) northeast of İğneada in Turkey when flares from an unknown vessel illuminated her. Mefküre failed to respond and carried on. In the same night, at 02:00 hrs, the German radio direction-finding station at Cape Pomorie in the Gulf of Burgas intercepted a radio signal of the Soviet Shchuka-class submarine, Shch-215, with a bearing of 116 degrees. "This bearing crossed the course of Mefkure and the two Turkish vessels almost exactly at the area where Mefkure was sunk during that night." The German historian Jürgen Rohwer claimed Shch-215 as the vessel which then attacked. Shch-215 fired 90 rounds from her 45-mm guns and 650 rounds from her 7.62 mm machine guns. Mefküre caught fire and sank. Her captain, Kazım Turan, and six of his crew escaped in the only available lifeboat, but only five of the refugees survived. The number of refugees killed is unknown, but one estimate suggests it includes 37 children.

On 30 July 1944 submarine Shch-215, under command of Captain 3rd Rank AI Strizhak, had departed from Batum, operating at the approaches off Burgas. This submarine, on the night of 5 August, claimed the sinking of a big schooner with about 200 armed men aboard, answering the attack with rifles and light machine guns, and in addition one "barkass", possibly a life boat. Shch-215 made the attack in position 42.00'N 28°42'E, at a distance of 19 nautical miles (35 km; 22 mi) westward from the ordered course of Mefküre.

A fortnight after the sinking a JTA news report alleged that three German surface craft had sunk Mefküre. The same report stated that Bulbul had been intercepted, too, but was allowed to proceed after identifying herself; at daybreak she rescued Mefküre's survivors. Bulbul continued to İğneada, whence her 395 refugees and the five surviving Mefküre refugees continued by road and rail to Istanbul. Morina also reached Turkey, and refugees from both ships continued overland to Palestine.

== Memorials ==
There are memorials to those killed aboard Mefküre at the Giurgiului Cemetery in the south of Bucharest in Romania and at Ashdod in Israel.

== See also ==
- Aliyah Bet
- Patria disaster
- Struma disaster
