= Black Sea campaign =

Black Sea campaign may refer to the following military campaigns in and around the Black Sea:

- Black Sea campaign (Crimean War), 1853–1855
- Black Sea campaign (World War I)
- Black Sea campaign (World War II)
- Snake Island campaign, 2022
