= German submarine U-18 (1935) =

German World War II submarine

Coordinates: 44°12′N 28°41′E

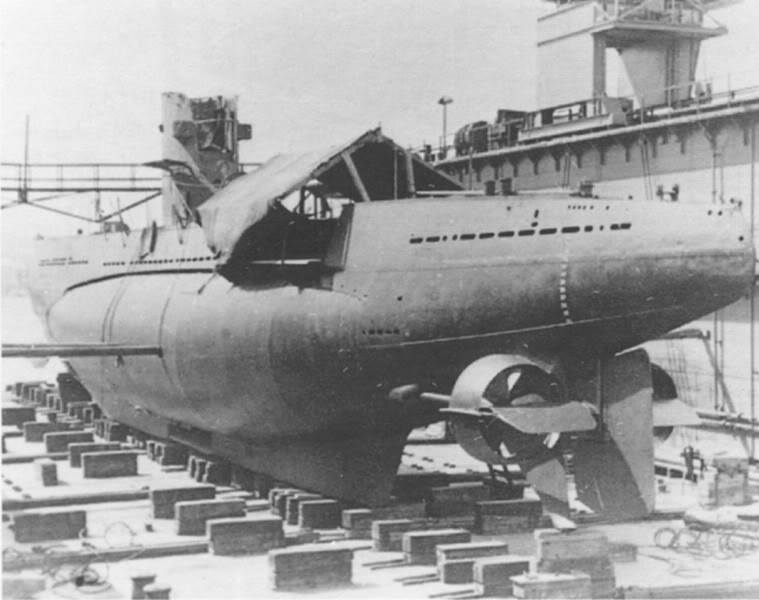
- U-18 being re-assembled at Galați, Romania

History

Nazi Germany
- Name: U-18
- Ordered: 2 February 1935
- Builder: Germaniawerft, Kiel; Galați shipyard, Romania
- Yard number: 548
- Laid down: 10 July 1935
- Launched: 7 December 1935
- Commissioned: 4 January 1936
- Fate: Scuttled 25 August 1944 at Constanţa in the Black Sea

General characteristics
- Class & type: Type IIB coastal submarine
- Displacement: 279 t (275 long tons) surfaced; 328 t (323 long tons) submerged
- Length: 42.70 m (140 ft 1 in) o/a; 27.80 m (91 ft 2 in) pressure hull
- Beam: 4.08 m (13 ft 5 in) (o/a); 4.00 m (13 ft 1 in) (pressure hull)
- Height: 8.60 m (28 ft 3 in)
- Draught: 3.90 m (12 ft 10 in)
- Installed power: 700 PS (510 kW; 690 bhp) (diesels); 410 PS (300 kW; 400 shp) (electric)
- Propulsion: 2 shafts; 2 × diesel engines; 2 × electric motors
- Speed: 13 knots (24 km/h; 15 mph) surfaced; 7 knots (13 km/h; 8.1 mph) submerged
- Range: 1,800 nmi (3,300 km; 2,100 mi) at 12 knots (22 km/h; 14 mph) surfaced; 35–43 nmi (65–80 km; 40–49 mi) at 4 knots (7.4 km/h; 4.6 mph) submerged
- Test depth: 80 m (260 ft)
- Complement: 3 officers, 22 men
- Armament: 3 × 53.3 cm (21 in) torpedo tubes; 5 × torpedoes or up to 12 TMA or 18 TMB mines; 1 × 2 cm (0.79 in) anti-aircraft gun

Service record
- Part of: 1st U-boat Flotilla; 4 January – 20 November 1936; 3rd U-boat Flotilla; 30 September 1937 – 1 August 1939; 1 September – 1 November 1939; U-boat Training Flotilla; 1 November 1939 – 1 March 1940; 1st U-boat Training Flotilla; 1 April 1939 – 1 June 1940; 24th U-boat Flotilla; 1 July – 17 December 1940; 22nd U-boat Flotilla; 18 December 1940 – 18 August 1942; 30th U-boat Flotilla; 6 May 1943 – 25 August 1944
- Identification codes: M 23 452
- Commanders: Oblt.z.S. / Kptlt. Hans Pauckstadt; 4 January – 20 November 1936; Kptlt. Heinz Beduhn; 30 September – 31 October 1937; Oblt.z.S. / Kptlt. Max-Hermann Bauer; 1 November 1937 – 24 November 1939; Oblt.z.S. Ernst Mengersen; 24 November 1939 – 2 September 1940; Oblt.z.S. / Kptlt. Hans-Heinz Linder; 3 September – 17 December 1940; Kptlt. Ernst Vogelsang; 18 December 1940 – 6 May 1941; Lt.z.S. / Oblt.z.S. Hans-Achim von Rosenberg-Gruszcynski; 7 May 1941 – 31 May 1942; Oblt.z.S. Friedrich-Wilhelm Wissmann; 1 June – 18 August 1942; Oblt.z.S. Karl Fleige; 6 May 1943 – 1 May 1944; Oblt.z.S. Hans-Jürgen Bartsch; 2 – 25 May 1944; Oblt.z.S. Rudolf Arendt; 25 May – 7 June 1944; Oblt.z.S. Karl Fleige; 8 June – 25 August 1944
- Operations: 14 patrols; 1st patrol: a. 30 August – 7 September 1939; b. 8 September 1939; 2nd patrol: 14 – 24 September 1939; 3rd patrol: 2 – 19 October 1939; 4th patrol: 15 – 23 November 1939; 5th patrol: 18 – 26 January 1940; 6th patrol: a. 11 – 24 February 1940; b. 27 – 28 February 1940; 7th patrol: 26 May – 9 June 1943; 8th patrol: a. 16 – 29 June 1943; b. 3 – 22 July 1943; 9th patrol: 21 August – 24 September 1943; 10th patrol: 27 October – 24 November 1943; 11th patrol: 29 January – 29 February 1944; 12th patrol: 25 March – 27 April 1944; 13th patrol: 25 May – 7 June 1944; 14th patrol: 24 July – 16 August 1944
- Victories: 2 merchant ships sunk (1,500 GRT); 1 auxiliary warship sunk (400 GRT); 1 merchant ship damaged (7,745 GRT); 1 warship damaged (56 tons)

German submarine U-18 was a Type IIB U-boat of Nazi Germany's Kriegsmarine during World War II. It was laid down 10 July 1935 and commissioned on 4 January 1936. It served in many U-boat flotillas during its service.

== Design ==
German Type IIB submarines were enlarged versions of the original Type IIs. U-18 had a displacement of 279 tonnes (275 long tons) when at the surface and 328 tonnes (323 long tons) while submerged. Officially, the standard tonnage was 250 long tons (254 t), however. The U-boat had a total length of 42.70 m (140 ft 1 in), a pressure hull length of 28.20 m (92 ft 6 in), a beam of 4.08 m (13 ft 5 in), a height of 8.60 m (28 ft 3 in), and a draught of 3.90 m (12 ft 10 in). The submarine was powered by two MWM RS 127 S four-stroke, six-cylinder diesel engines of 700 metric horsepower (510 kW; 690 shp) for cruising, two Siemens-Schuckert PG VV 322/36 double-acting electric motors producing a total of 460 metric horsepower (340 kW; 450 shp) for use while submerged. She had two shafts and two 0.85 m (3 ft) propellers. The boat was capable of operating at depths of up to 80–150 metres (260–490 ft).

The submarine had a maximum surface speed of 12 knots (22 km/h; 14 mph) and a maximum submerged speed of 7 knots (13 km/h; 8.1 mph). When submerged, the boat could operate for 35–42 nautical miles (65–78 km; 40–48 mi) at 4 knots (7.4 km/h; 4.6 mph); when surfaced, she could travel 3,800 nautical miles (7,000 km; 4,400 mi) at 8 knots (15 km/h; 9.2 mph). U-18 was fitted with three 53.3 cm (21 in) torpedo tubes at the bow, five torpedoes or up to twelve Type A torpedo mines, and a 2 cm (0.79 in) anti-aircraft gun. The boat had a complement of twenty-five.

== Fate ==
While a training boat, U-18 sank at 0954 hrs on 20 November 1936 in Lübeck Bay, after a collision with T-156. Eight men died and 12 survived. It was raised on 28 November 1936. It returned to service on 30 September 1937. On 3 September 1939 it attacked a Polish submarine, most probably ORP Sęp, but missed. Starting late 1942 she served in the 30th U-boat Flotilla, after being transported in sections along the Danube to the Romanian port of Galați. She was then re-assembled by the Romanians at the Galați shipyard and sent to the Black Sea.

On 20 August 1944, in a Soviet air raid on the Romanian harbor of Constanţa in the Black Sea, U-18 was damaged and as a result was deemed not seaworthy and was scuttled on the 25th.

The boat was raised by the USSR in late 1944. It was sunk for target practice by the Soviet submarine M-120 on 26 May 1947 off Sevastopol (also sunk that day was the former U-24).

== Summary of raiding history ==
Date	Name	Nationality	Tonnage (Note: Merchant ship tonnages are in gross register tons. Military vessels are listed by tons displacement.)	Fate
18 November 1939	Parkhill	United Kingdom	500	Sunk
24 January 1940	Bisp	Norway	1,000	Sunk
29 August 1943	TSC-11 Dzhalita	Soviet Navy	400	Sunk
30 August 1943	SKA-0132	Soviet Navy	56	Damaged
18 November 1943	Josif Stalin	Soviet Union	7,745	Damaged

== Bibliography ==
- Busch, Rainer; Röll, Hans-Joachim (1999). German U-boat commanders of World War II : a biographical dictionary. Translated by Brooks, Geoffrey. London, Annapolis, Md: Greenhill Books, Naval Institute Press. ISBN 1-55750-186-6.
- Busch, Rainer; Röll, Hans-Joachim (1999). Deutsche U-Boot-Verluste von September 1939 bis Mai 1945 [German U-boat losses from September 1939 to May 1945]. Der U-Boot-Krieg (in German). Vol. IV. Hamburg, Berlin, Bonn: Mittler. ISBN 3-8132-0514-2.
- Gröner, Erich; Jung, Dieter; Maass, Martin (1991). U-boats and Mine Warfare Vessels. German Warships 1815–1945. Vol. 2. Translated by Thomas, Keith; Magowan, Rachel. London: Conway Maritime Press. ISBN 0-85177-593-4.
- Kemp, Paul (1999). U-Boats Destroyed - German Submarine Losses in the World Wars. London: Arms & Armour. ISBN 1-85409-515-3.
