= Soviet submarine Shch-214 =

1937 Shchuka-class submarine

- Profile drawing of Series X Shch-class submarine

History

Soviet Union
- Name: Shch-214
- Builder: 61 Kommunar Yard, Mykolayiv, Ukraine
- Laid down: 13 July 1935
- Launched: 23 April 1937
- Commissioned: 4 March 1939
- Fate: Sunk, 19 June 1942

General characteristics
- Class & type: Series X Shchuka-class submarine
- Displacement: 590 t (580 long tons) (surfaced); 708 t (697 long tons) (submerged)
- Length: 58.75 m (192 ft 9 in) (o/a)
- Beam: 6.2 m (20 ft 4 in)
- Draught: 4.1 m (13 ft 5 in) (mean)
- Installed power: 1,600 PS (1,200 kW) (diesel); 800 PS (590 kW) (electric)
- Propulsion: 2-shaft diesel electric
- Speed: 11.7 knots (21.7 km/h; 13.5 mph) (surfaced); 7 knots (13 km/h; 8.1 mph) (submerged)
- Range: 5,200 nmi (9,600 km; 6,000 mi) at 7.3 knots (13.5 km/h; 8.4 mph) (surfaced); 98 nmi (181 km; 113 mi) at 2.2 knots (4.1 km/h; 2.5 mph) (submerged)
- Test depth: 75 m (246 ft)
- Complement: 40
- Armament: 4 × bow 533 mm (21 in) torpedo tubes; 2 × stern 533 mm (21 in) torpedo tubes; 2 × 45 mm (1.8 in) deck guns

Shch-214 was a Series X Shchuka-class submarine built for the Soviet Navy during the 1930s. Completed in 1939, the boat was assigned to the Black Sea Fleet and participated in the defense of the Soviet Union when the Axis powers invaded it in June 1941 (Operation Barbarossa). She made four patrols in the southern area of the Black Sea before she was tasked to ferry supplies to besieged Sevastopol in mid-1942. Shch-214 was torpedoed enroute and sunk by an Italian MAS boat.

== Background and description ==
The Series X Shchuka-class submarines were improved versions of the Series V-bis-2 boats placed into production because Soviet shipyards were having difficulties integrating new German technology. The boats displaced 590 metric tons (580 long tons) surfaced and 708 t (697 long tons) submerged. They had an overall length of 58.75 meters (193 ft), a beam of 6.2 meters (20 ft 4 in), and a mean draft of 4.1 meters (13 ft). The boats had a diving depth of 75 m (246 ft). Their crew numbered 40 officers and crewmen.

For surface running, the Series X boats were powered by a pair of 38V-8 diesel engines, one per propeller shaft. The uprated engines produced a total of 1,600 metric horsepower (1,177 kW), enough to give them a speed of 11.7 knots (21.7 km/h; 13.5 mph). When submerged each shaft was driven by a 400-metric-horsepower (294 kW) electric motor for 7 knots (13 km/h; 8.1 mph). The boats had a surface endurance of 5,200 nautical miles (9,600 km; 6,000 mi) at 7.3 knots (13.5 km/h; 8.4 mph) and 98 nmi (181 km; 113 mi) at 2.2 knots (4.1 km/h; 2.5 mph) submerged.

The Series X boats were armed with six 533-millimeter (21 in) torpedo tubes. Four of these were in the bow and the others were in the stern. They carried four reloads for the forward tubes. The submarines were also equipped with a pair of 45-millimeter (2 in) 21-K deck guns fore and aft on the conning tower.

== Construction and career ==
Shch-214 was laid down by 61 Kommunara Yard in Mykolayiv, Ukraine, on 13 July 1935. She was launched on 23 April 1937 and commissioned into the Black Sea Fleet on 4 March 1939. Captain Vlasov Vladimir Yakovlevich commanded the submarine until her loss. The submarine was refitting when the Axis powers invaded on 22 June 1941 and became operational in September. Shch-214 sank the Italian tanker SS Torcello of 3,336 gross register tons (GRT) on 5 November and a neutral Turkish schooner two days prior. Four other schooners would follow as the submarine patrolled off the Bosporus and the coasts of Romania and Bulgaria. On 22 January 1942, Shch-214 was damaged in a storm at Tuapse when she was crushed against the quayside by the destroyer Boyky. The boat was under repair until May. On her first supply mission to Sevastopol she was torpedoed and sunk by the Italian motor torpedo boat MAS-571 near Gaspra, Crimea. Only two of her crew were rescued and taken as prisoners of war.

== Claims ==
Ships sunk by Shch-214
Date	Ship	Flag	Tonnage	Notes
3 November 1941	Kaynakdere	(Turkey)	85 GRT	sailing vessel (gunfire)
5 November 1941	Torcello	(Kingdom of Italy)	3,336 GRT	tanker (torpedo)
1 January 1942	Koraltepe	(Turkey)	209 GRT	sailing vessel (gunfire)
29 May 1942	Hudavendigar	(Turkey)	90 GRT	sailing vessel (ramming)
31 May 1942	Mahbubdihan	(Turkey)	85 GRT	sailing vessel (gunfire)
2 June 1942	Kaynarea	(Turkey)	? GRT	sailing vessel (ramming)
Total:			3,805 GRT	

== Bibliography ==
- Budzbon, Przemysław; Radziemski, Jan & Twardowski, Marek (2022). Warships of the Soviet Fleets 1939–1945. Vol. I: Major Combatants. Annapolis, Maryland: Naval Institute Press. ISBN 978-1-68247-877-6.
- Polmar, Norman & Noot, Jurrien (1991). Submarines of the Russian and Soviet Navies, 1718–1990. Annapolis, Maryland: Naval Institute Press. ISBN 0-87021-570-1.
- Rohwer, Jürgen (2005). Chronology of the War at Sea 1939–1945: The Naval History of World War Two (Third Revised ed.). Annapolis, Maryland: Naval Institute Press. ISBN 1-59114-119-2.
