= Soviet submarine L-4 =

1931 Leninets-class submarine

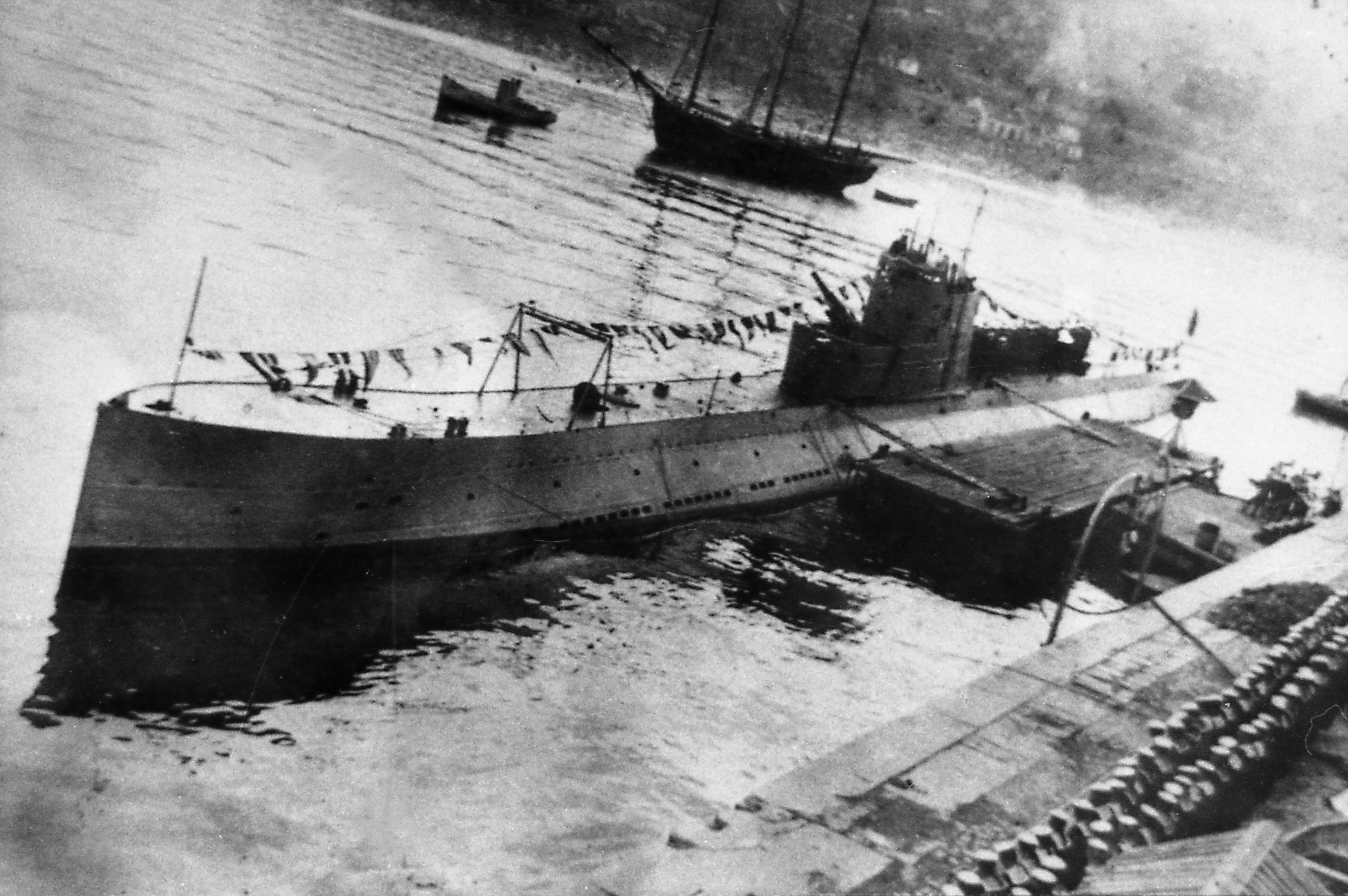
- L-4 Garibaldets

History

Soviet Union
- Name: L-4
- Awarded: Order of the Red Banner, 23 October 1942
- Builder: A. Marti Yard, Nikolaev
- Laid down: 15 March 1930
- Launched: 31 August 1931
- Completed: 8 October 1933
- Commissioned: 14 October 1933
- Renamed: From Garibalidiyets (Гарибальдиец), 15 September 1934; To B-34, 1949
- Reclassified: As a training ship, 1953
- Stricken: 17 February 1956
- Fate: Scrapped after 17 February 1956

General characteristics (as built)
- Class & type: Leninets-class submarine minelayer
- Displacement: 1,051 t (1,034 long tons) (surfaced); 1,327 t (1,306 long tons) (submerged)
- Length: 79 m (259 ft 2 in) (o/a)
- Beam: 7.3 m (23 ft 11 in)
- Draft: 4.1 m (13 ft 5 in) (mean)
- Installed power: 2,200 PS (1,600 kW) (diesels); 1,300 PS (960 kW) (electric)
- Propulsion: 2 shafts; diesel-electric; 2 × diesel engines; 2 × electric motors
- Speed: 14 knots (26 km/h; 16 mph) (surfaced); 10 knots (19 km/h; 12 mph) (submerged)
- Range: 6,000 nmi (11,000 km; 6,900 mi) at 10 knots (19 km/h; 12 mph) (surfaced); 135 nmi (250 km; 155 mi) at 2.5 knots (4.6 km/h; 2.9 mph) (submerged)
- Test depth: 75 m (246 ft)
- Complement: 54
- Armament: 6 × bow 533 mm (21 in) torpedo tubes; 20 × mines; 1 × 100 mm (3.9 in) deck gun

L-4 was one of six Series II double-hulled Leninets or L-class minelayer submarines built for the Soviet Navy during the early 1930s. Commissioned in 1933 into the Black Sea Fleet, she was initially named Garibaldets but was later renamed L-4 when the navy decided to use alphanumeric names for submarines in 1934. The submarine was refitted when the Axis powers invaded the Soviet Union in June 1941 (Operation Barbarossa) and became operational two months later. L-4 was primarily used as a minelayer during the war, but did make seven supply runs to besieged Sevastopol in 1942. The boat was awarded the Order of the Red Banner later that year. Only one of her torpedo attacks was successful, damaging an oil tanker in 1944. After the war she was renamed B-34 in 1949 and became a training ship in 1953. The submarine was stricken from the navy list three years later and subsequently scrapped.

== Design and description ==
The Soviet Navy decided in the early 1920s on a need for both patrol and minelaying submarines, with the latter derived from the former. Construction of the minelayers was postponed until the submarine design bureaus had time to learn the lessons from building the Dekabrist-class patrol submarines and the British submarine HMS L55 which had been salvaged in 1928. The boats displaced 1,070 metric tons (1,050 long tons) surfaced and 1,140 t (1,120 long tons) submerged. They had an overall length of 79.93 meters (262 ft), a beam of 7.3 meters (23 ft 11 in), and a mean draft of 4.3 meters (14 ft). The boats had a diving depth of 75 m (246 ft). Their crew numbered 53 officers and crewmen.

For surface running, the Leninets-class boats were powered by a pair of 42-BM-6 diesel engines, one per propeller shaft. The engines produced a total of 2,200 metric horsepower (1,618 kW), enough to give them a speed of 14 knots (26 km/h; 16 mph). When submerged each shaft was driven by a PG 84 650-metric-horsepower (478 kW) electric motor, giving them a speed of 10 knots (19 km/h; 12 mph). The boats had a surface endurance of 6,000 nautical miles (11,000 km; 6,900 mi) at 10 knots (19 km/h; 12 mph) and 135 nmi (250 km; 155 mi) at 2.5 knots (4.6 km/h; 2.9 mph) submerged. For submerged cruising the Leninets class were equipped with a pair of 30 PS (22 kW) electric motors. As completed the boats had problems with stability, excessive diving times (up to three minutes), noisy auxiliary machinery, and poor-quality batteries. These produced excessive amounts of explosive hydrogen gas which could lead to fires. By the end of 1934 the battery compartments had been rendered gas-tight and the ventilation had been improved.

They were armed with six 533-millimeter (21 in) torpedo tubes in the bow, each with one reload. A pair of horizontal tubes for a total of 20 PLT-10 mines ran inside the pressure hull to the extreme stern where they would be ejected after the tubes had been flooded. The mines could be laid down to a depth of 150 m (490 ft) while the boats cruised at a speed of 8 knots (15 km/h; 9.2 mph) and depths of 4–12 m (13–39 ft). They were also initially equipped with a 100-millimeter (3.9 in) B-2 deck gun mounted on the front of the conning tower, although this was replaced by a B-34 gun of the same size and moved to a position forward of the conning tower. At some point during the 1930s, a 45 mm (1.8 in) 21-K anti-aircraft (AA) gun was added on the rear of the conning tower.

== Construction and career ==
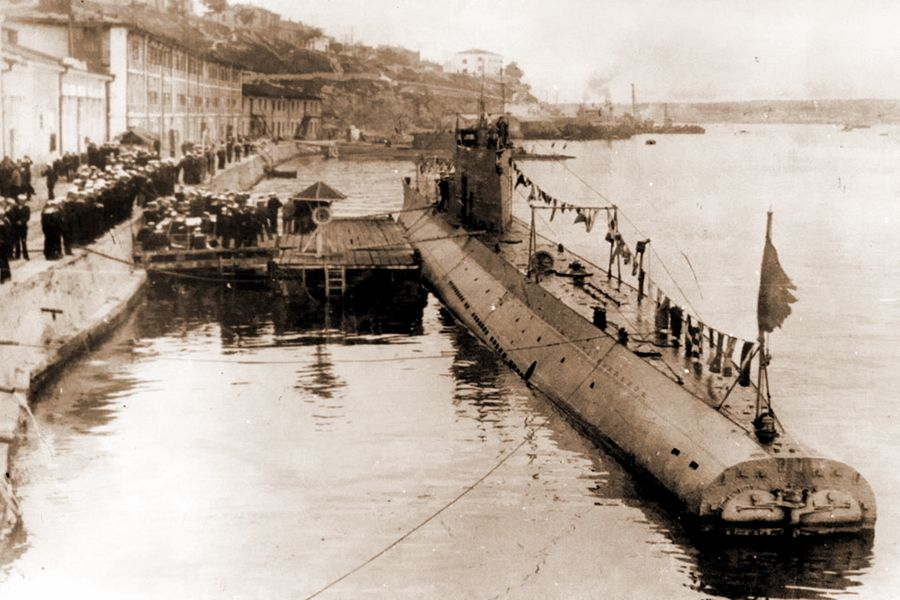
Stern view of L-4 in 1933, showing the doors for her mine tubes

L-4 was laid down on 15 March 1930 by the A. Marti Shipyard in Nikolaev (now Mykolaiv), Ukraine, with the name of Garibaldiets. She was launched on 31 August 1931 and completed on 8 October 1933. She was commissioned into the Black Sea Fleet two days later. On 28 August 1934 a build-up of hydrogen caught fire and exploded, killing five men. The boat was repaired and was renamed L-4 on 15 September 1934. She was undergoing a refit when the Axis Powers invaded on 22 June which was completed in early August. During the refit, her 21-K AA gun was replaced by a 12.7 mm (0.50 in) machine gun. At this time she was assigned to the 1st Division of the 1st Submarine Brigade.

L-4 and her sister L-5 laid three minefields each off the Romanian coast between 2 and 28 August. L-4 then laid minefields off Georgi and Varna, Bulgaria, in early September; the latter minefield sank a Bulgarian steamship on 15 September. The submarine then laid two minefields off the Bulgarian coast between 15 and 29 September. The Romanian minelayer NMS Regele Carol I fell victim to them on 10 October. L-4 laid a minefield off Mangalia on 5 October and then made unsuccessful attacks on the Romanian destroyer NMS Regina Maria and the Romanian torpedo boat NMS Sborul. The boat relaid her minefield off Mangalia on 24 October. She was refitted from December 1941 to April 1942, after being damaged by a mine off Varna.

Between 7 May and 2 July, the submarine made seven supply runs to besieged Sevastopol. She delivered a total of 160 t (157 long tons) of ammunition, 290 t (285 long tons) of food, 27 t (27 long tons) of gasoline and 7 people to the city, while evacuating 243 people. L-4 laid a minefield south of Cape Sarych on 19 August and off Burnas Lagoon on 19 September. L-4 was awarded the Order of the Red Banner on 23 October. The boat had an uneventful patrol between Ahtopol, Bulgaria, and the Bosporus in December. Between 22 March 1943 and 21 May, she made a number of unsuccessful attacks on German convoys supplying the Kuban bridgehead. In between more futile attacks on supply convoys, L-4 attempted to intercept Axis shipping passing through the Bosporus, only managing to sink a few small vessels in July. She laid a minefield off Yevpatoria on 18 July without result. The boat was refitted from September to April 1944.

L-4 unsuccessfully attacked the transport SS Helga on 26 April. The following month, she attacked a convoy evacuating Axis troops from Crimea, badly damaging the 7,327 GRT oil tanker Friederike, ex-Firuz, such that she was a constructive total loss, on 11 May. The boat made her last war patrol in August; it was uneventful. In 1944 Michman Ivan Perov was awarded Hero of the Soviet Union.

She was renamed B-34 in 1949 and became a training ship in 1953. The submarine was stricken on 17 February 1956 and subsequently broken up.

== Claims ==
Ships sunk by L-4
Date	Ship	Flag	Tonnage	Notes
15 September 1941	Chipka	(Tsardom of Bulgaria (1908–1946))	2,304 GRT	freighter (mine)
19 September 1941	W-2	(Tsardom of Bulgaria (1908–1946))	ca. 50 GRT	minesweeper (mine)
10 October 1941	Regele Carol I	(Kingdom of Romania)	2,369 GRT	minelayer (mine)
22 July 1943	Hudayi Bahri	(Turkey)	29 GRT	sailing vessel (gunfire)
23 July 1943	Gurpinar	(Turkey)	100 GRT	sailing vessel (gunfire)
28 July 1943	EL-73	(Nazi Germany)	139 GRT	lighter (mine)
23 November 1943	Santa Fé	(Nazi Germany)	4,627 GRT	freighter (mine)
11 May 1944	Friederike	(Nazi Germany)	7,327 GRT	tanker (torpedo). Not sunk but written-off.
Total:			16,940 GRT	

== Bibliography ==
- Budzbon, Przemysław; Radziemski, Jan & Twardowski, Marek (2022). Warships of the Soviet Fleets 1939–1945. Vol. I: Major Combatants. Naval Institute Press. ISBN 978-1-68247-877-6.
- Platonov, A. V. (1996). Советские Боевые Корабли 1941-1945 гг [Soviet Warships 1941-1945: III. Submarines]. Vol. III. Подводные Лодки. Almanakh TSitadel. OCLC 40174403.
- Polmar, Norman & Noot, Jurrien (1991). Submarines of the Russian and Soviet Navies, 1718–1990. Naval Institute Press. ISBN 0-87021-570-1.
- Rohwer, Jürgen (2005). Chronology of the War at Sea 1939–1945: The Naval History of World War Two (Third Revised ed.). Naval Institute Press. ISBN 1-59114-119-2.
