= Action of 9 July 1941 =

1941 naval battle

- Part of the Black Sea Campaigns (1941-44)
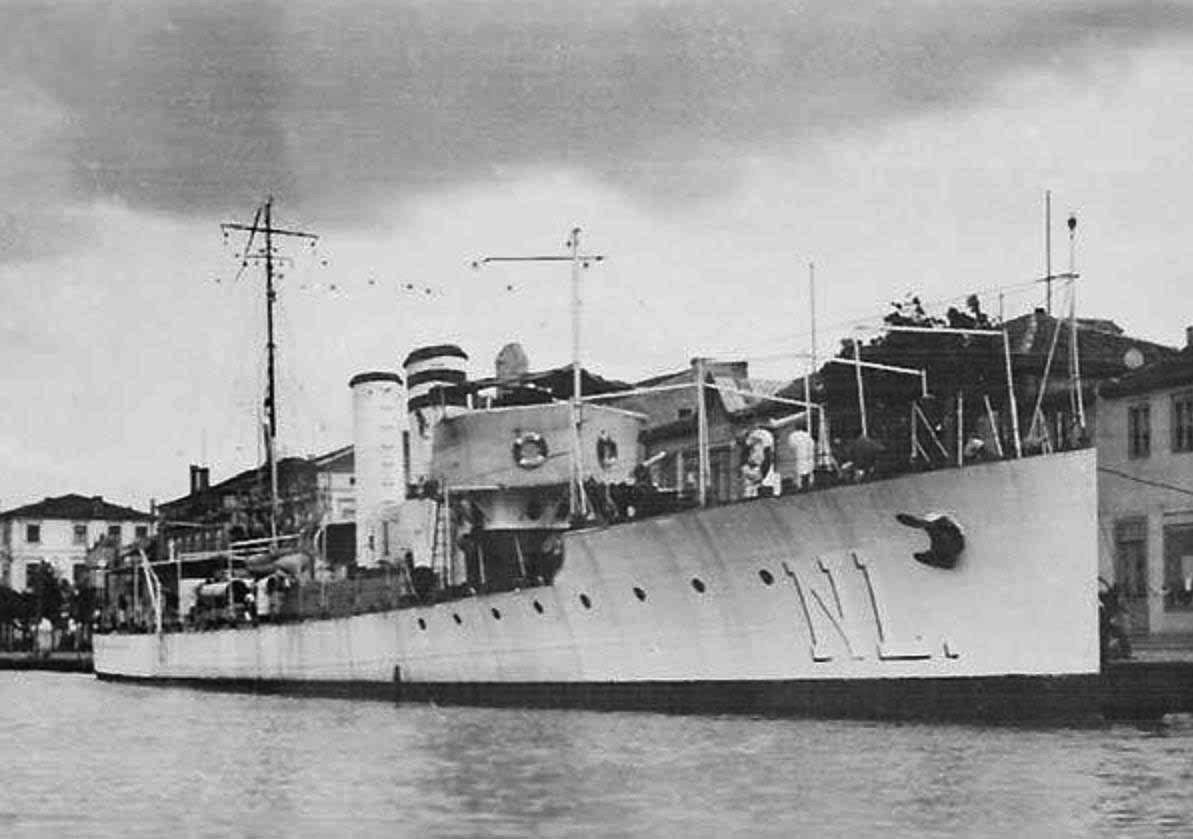
- Romanian torpedo boat Năluca
Date	9 July 1941
Location	Off Mangalia, Black Sea
Result	Romanian victory

Belligerents
Romania	Soviet Union

Commanders and leaders
Horia Popovici	S.A. Karakai †

Strength
3 torpedo boats	1 submarine

Casualties and losses
None	38 killed 1 submarine sunk

The action of 9 July 1941 was a naval engagement between the Soviet and Romanian navies during World War II, taking place near the Romanian port-city of Mangalia.

== Background ==
When the Axis powers launched Operation Barbarossa in June 1941, Romania joined the invasion with the aims of recovering the provinces of Bessarabia and Northern Bukovina, which were occupied by the Soviet Union the previous year. On 26 June, the Soviet Black Sea Fleet unsuccessfully attacked the Romanian port of Constanța, resulting in the loss of the destroyer leader Moskva to Romanian mines. The loss of Moskva caused Soviet Admiral Filipp Oktyabrsky to be much more cautious in his use of surface warships.

== Action ==
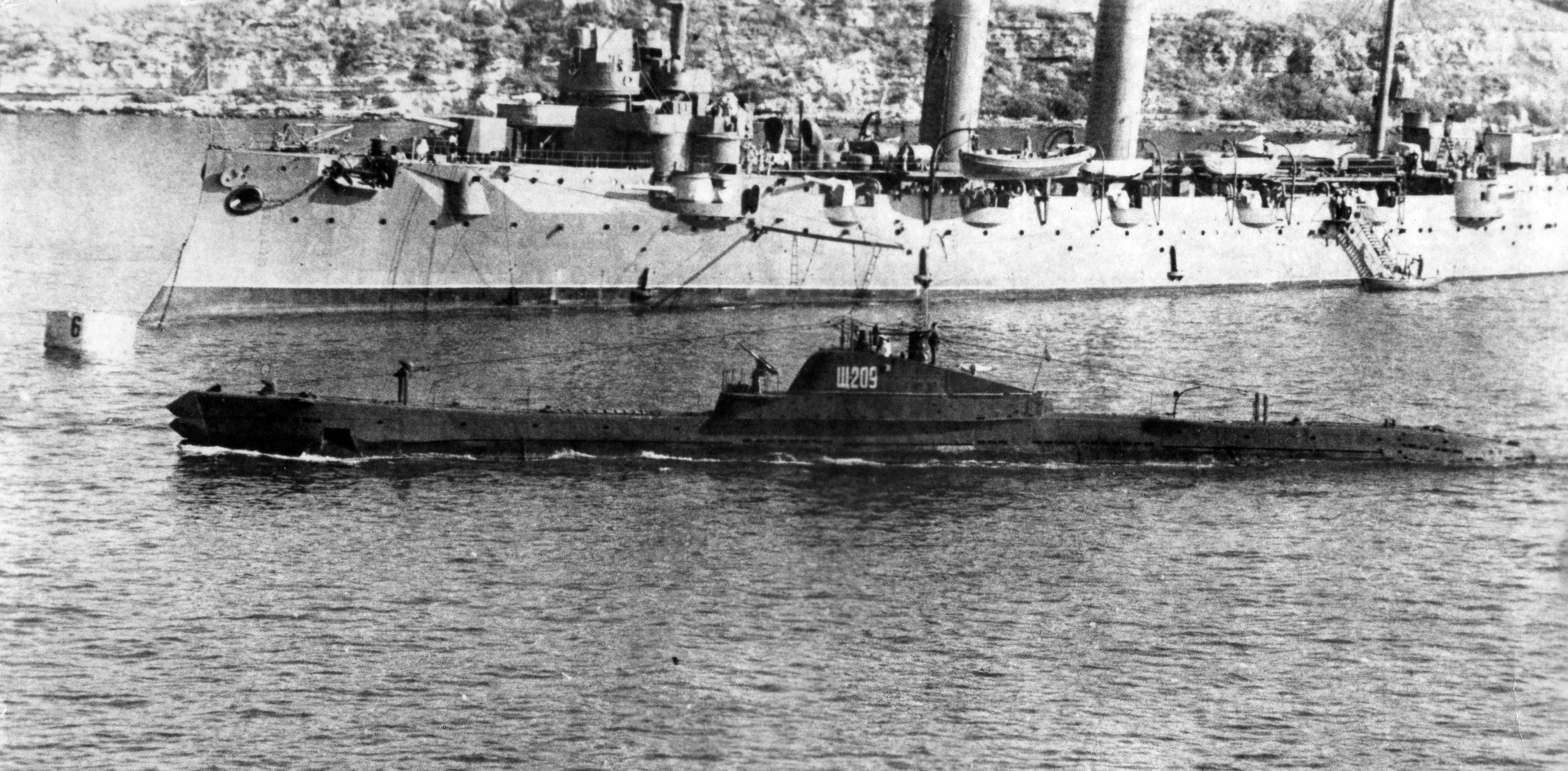
Soviet Shchuka-class submarine in the Black Sea

On 9 July 1941, one week after Romania launched Operation München, the Romanian Navy's 250t-class torpedo boat Năluca (Captain Horia Popovici) and motor torpedo boats Viscolul and Vijelia were informed by the Romanian gunboat Stihi that the periscope of an enemy submarine was sighted near Mangalia. Năluca was the first to arrive at the scene and subsequently spotted and engaged the Soviet Shchuka-class submarine Shch-206 (Captain S. A. Karakai). In the first part of the battle, Năluca attacked the submarine with 20 mm rounds, but the latter submerged in order to escape. The Romanian torpedo boat subsequently used depth charges, being soon joined by the two motor torpedo boats. At 2:56 pm, the Soviet submarine was confirmed sunk by Viscolul, none of her crew of 38 survived.

== Aftermath ==
The result of this engagement secured Mangalia for the rest of the Second World War, as no other Soviet warships were subsequently sighted near the port. It also discouraged the Soviet Navy from using the medium-sized Shchuka-class submarines for operations near the Romanian coast, relying instead on the much smaller submarines of the M-class, as shown during the engagements of 17 December 1941 and 1 October 1942.
