= Soviet submarine Shch-215 =

- Shchuka-class X-series submarine

History

Soviet Union
- Name: Shch-215 (1937–49); S-215 (1949–56)
- Builder: Sudostroytelnyi zavod imeny 61 Kommunara, Nikolayev, USSR
- Yard number: 1039
- Laid down: 27 March 1935
- Launched: 11 January 1937
- Commissioned: 30 August 1938
- Stricken: 29 December 1955
- Fate: Scrapped 18 January 1956

General characteristics
- Class & type: Shchuka-class submarine, Type X
- Displacement: 577 tons surfaced; 704 tons submerged
- Length: 57.00 m (187 ft 0 in)
- Beam: 6.20 m (20 ft 4 in)
- Draught: 3.78 m (12 ft 5 in)
- Propulsion: 2 shaft diesel electric, 1,020 kW (1,370 bhp) diesel, 600 kW (800 bhp) electric
- Speed: 12.5 knots (23.2 km/h; 14.4 mph) on the surface; 6.3 knots (11.7 km/h; 7.2 mph) submerged
- Range: 6,000 nautical miles (11,000 km; 6,900 mi) at 8 knots (15 km/h; 9.2 mph)
- Test depth: 91 m (300 ft)
- Complement: 38
- Armament: 4 × bow torpedo tubes; 2 × stern torpedo tubes; (10 torpedoes); 2 × 45 mm (1.8 in) semi-automatic guns

Щ-215 (transliterated as Shch-215 or sometimes SC-215) was a Soviet Navy Shchuka-class submarine, Type X. She was built at the Sudostroytelnyi zavod imeny 61 kommunara in Mykolaiv, Ukrainian SSR, and entered service in October 1938 with the Soviet Black Sea fleet based at Sevastopol. Shch-215 survived the Second World War, was reclassified С-215 (S-215 in the Roman alphabet) in 1949 and was decommissioned in 1955.

Shch-215 is notorious for an attack in February 1944 when she torpedoed and sank the motor schooner MV Mefküre. Mefküre was carrying between 300 and 400 Jewish refugees, all but five of whom were killed.

== Wartime service ==
On 9 October 1941, north of Cape Emine in Bulgaria, Shch-215 attacked what she identified as a patrol vessel. The submarine fired a torpedo but it missed.

On 18 November, east-north-east of Tsarevo, Bulgaria, Shch-215 torpedoed and sank the 641 gross register tons (GRT) Turkish steamship Yenice.

On 20 June 1942, south of the mouth of the Sulina branch of the Danube Delta, Shch-215 attacked the German minesweepers FR 1 and FR 11 with two torpedoes at the vessels, both of which missed.

Late on 23 January 1943, south of Cape Tarkhankut in Crimea, Shch-215 fired three torpedoes at a German barge, all of which missed. In the small hours of the next day, west of Yevpatoria in Crimea, Shch-215 attacked the German barge F 125. The submarine fired three torpedoes and her deck gun at the barge, all of which missed.

On 8 March, west-south-west of Cape Tarkhankut, Shch-215 attacked the German 965 GRT tanker Wolga-Don escorted by two patrol vessels. The submarine fired three torpedoes at the tanker, all of which missed. On 13 March, south-west of Cape Tarkhankut, Shch-215 attacked the Hungarian 465 GRT cargo ship Budapest. The submarine fired two torpedoes at the freighter but both missed.

On 16 May, south of Sudak in Crimea, Shch-215 fired two torpedoes at the German barge F 170. On 24 May, north-north-west of Sevastopol, Shch-215 attacked the Italian 3,740 GRT tanker Celeno with four torpedoes, all of which missed. On 29 May, 40 nautical miles (74 km) south-east of Feodosiya in Crimea, Shch-215 fired a torpedo at the German tug Netty, but missed.

On 30 August, north of the Bosphorus in Turkey, Shch-215 torpedoed and sank the German 1,782 GRT cargo ship Thisbe.

Early on 11 November, west of Yevpatoria, Shch-215 fired two torpedoes at an unidentified merchant ship, both of which missed. Two hours later Shch-215 fired two more torpedoes at a merchant ship, probably the same vessel, but again both missed. Early on 15 November off Cape Tarkhankut, Shch-215 fired two torpedoes at a German convoy of barges and smaller vessels. Four hours later she fired two torpedoes, sinking the German barge F 592. The next day, west of Yevpatoria, Shch-215 fired two torpedoes at the German minesweeper MT 1, both of which missed.

On 27 March 1944, in the western part of the Black Sea, Shch-215 sighted the German 2,760 GRT cargo ship Totila being escorted by U-Jäger ("Submarine chaser") UJ-117. She attacked with four torpedoes, all of which missed.

On 16 April, midway between Constanța and Sevastopol, Shch-215 attacked a German convoy. The submarine fired four torpedoes, missing U-Jäger UJ-115.

On 24 August, north of Cape Emine, Shch-215 torpedoed and sank the Bulgarian 180 GRT sailing vessel Vita. The next day she torpedoed and sank the Turkish 712 GRT cargo ship Yilmaz.

=== MV Mefküre massacre ===
On 5 August 1944, north-west of the Bosphorus, Shch-215 sank the Turkish small motor schooner Mefküre by torpedo and gunfire. Mefküre's tonnage is uncertain: some sources state 52 GRT; others 120 GRT. As well as torpedoing Mefküre, the submarine fired 90 rounds from her 45-mm guns and 650 rounds from her 7.62 mm machine guns. Shch-215's commander, A.I. Strizhak, claimed that he had seen about 200 armed men aboard Mefküre.

In fact Mefküre was carrying Jewish refugees who had embarked at Constanța bound for Palestine. Exactly how many refugees were crowded aboard is unknown, but a number estimated to be between 289 and 394 were killed. Six of Mefküre's seven crew and only five of the refugees survived. At daybreak they were rescued by the merchant ship Bulbul, which was also carrying Jewish refugees on the same route as part of the same charter.

Ships sunk by Shch-215
Date	Ship	Flag	Tonnage	Notes
18 November 1941	Yenice	(Turkey)	300 GRT	freighter (torpedo)
30 August 1943	Thisbé	(Nazi Germany)	1,782 GRT	freighter (torpedo)
15 November 1943	F-592	(Nazi Germany)	155 GRT	barge (torpedo)
5 August 1944	Mefküre	(Turkey)	52 GRT	motor schooner (torpedo and gunfire)
24 August 1944	Vita	(Bulgaria)	180 GRT	sailing vessel (torpedo and gunfire)
Total:			2,469 GRT	

== Post-war fate ==
On 16 June 1949 Shch-215 was reclassified S-215 (С-215 in the Cyrillic alphabet).

S-215 was laid up on 13 July 1953, decommissioned on 29 December 1955 and scrapped at Inkerman on 18 January 1956.

== See also ==
- Soviet submarine Shch-213, which sank the Jewish refugee ship MV Struma in 1942.
