= German submarine U-24 (1936) =

German World War II submarine

Coordinates: 44°12′N 28°41′E

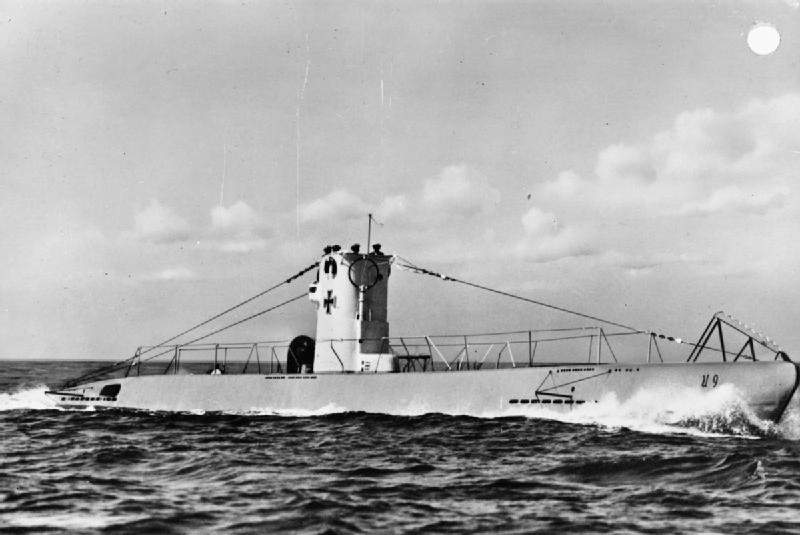
- U-9, a typical Type IIB boat

History

Nazi Germany
- Name: U-24
- Ordered: 2 February 1935
- Builder: Germaniawerft, Kiel; Galați shipyard, Romania
- Yard number: 554
- Laid down: 21 April 1936
- Launched: 24 September 1936
- Commissioned: 10 October 1936
- Fate: Scuttled on 25 August 1944, at Constanța in the Black Sea

General characteristics
- Class & type: Type IIB coastal submarine
- Displacement: 279 t (275 long tons) surfaced; 328 t (323 long tons) submerged
- Length: 42.70 m (140 ft 1 in) o/a; 27.80 m (91 ft 2 in) pressure hull
- Beam: 4.08 m (13 ft 5 in) (o/a); 4.00 m (13 ft 1 in) (pressure hull)
- Height: 8.60 m (28 ft 3 in)
- Draught: 3.90 m (12 ft 10 in)
- Installed power: 700 PS (510 kW; 690 bhp) (diesels); 410 PS (300 kW; 400 shp) (electric)
- Propulsion: 2 shafts; 2 × diesel engines; 2 × electric motors
- Speed: 13 knots (24 km/h; 15 mph) surfaced; 7 knots (13 km/h; 8.1 mph) submerged
- Range: 1,800 nmi (3,300 km; 2,100 mi) at 12 knots (22 km/h; 14 mph) surfaced; 35–43 nmi (65–80 km; 40–49 mi) at 4 knots (7.4 km/h; 4.6 mph) submerged
- Test depth: 80 m (260 ft)
- Complement: 3 officers, 22 men
- Armament: 3 × 53.3 cm (21 in) torpedo tubes; 5 × torpedoes or up to 12 TMA or 18 TMB mines; 1 × 2 cm (0.79 in) C/30 anti-aircraft gun

Service record
- Part of: 3rd U-boat Flotilla; 1 October 1936 – 1 August 1939; 1 September – 17 October 1939; 1st U-boat Flotilla; 18 October 1939 – 30 April 1940; 1st U-boat Training Flotilla; 1 May – 30 June 1940; 21st U-boat Flotilla; 1 July 1940 – 18 April 1942; 30th U-boat Flotilla; 14 October 1942 – 25 August 1944
- Identification codes: M 24 897
- Commanders: Oblt.z.S. Heinz Buchholz; 3 July – 30 September 1937; Oblt.z.S. / Kptlt. Udo Behrens; 8 October 1937 – 17 October 1939; Kptlt. Harald Jeppener-Haltenhoff; 18 October – 29 November 1939; Oblt.z.S. Udo Heilmann; 30 November 1939 – 21 August 1940; Oblt.z.S. Dietrich Borchert; 22 August 1940 – 10 March 1941; Oblt.z.S. Helmut Hennig; 11 March – 31 July 1941; Oblt.z.S. Hardo Rodler von Roithberg; 1 August 1941 – 18 April 1942; Oblt.z.S. Klaus Petersen; 14 October – 17 November 1942; Oblt.z.S. Clemens Schöler; 18 November 1942 – 15 April 1943; Oblt.z.S. / Kptlt. Klaus Petersen; 16 April 1943 – 7 April 1944; Oblt.z.S. Martin Landt-Hayen; 7 April – July 1944; Dieter Lenzmann; July – 25 Aug 1944
- Operations: 19 patrols: 1st patrol: a. 25 – 31 August 1939; b. 2 – 5 September 1939; c. 6 September 1939; 2nd patrol: 13 – 29 September 1939; 3rd patrol: 12 – 14 October 1939; 4th patrol: a. 23 – 29 October 1939; b. 30 October 1939; 5th patrol: 6 – 12 January 1940; 6th patrol: 27 January – 9 February 1940; 7th patrol: a. 14 – 20 March 1940; b. 25 – 26 March 1940; c. 9 – 10 April 1940; 8th patrol: a. 13 April – 5 May 1940; b. 6 – 7 May 1940; 9th patrol: 27 October – 9 November 1942; 10th patrol: 24 November – 16 December 1942; 11th patrol: 18 January – 18 February 1943; 12th patrol: a. 14 March – 3 April 1943; b. 10 – 15 April 1943; 13th patrol: a. 5 – 26 June 1943; b. 27 – 29 June 1943; 14th patrol: 26 July – 25 August 1943; 15th patrol: a. 30 September – 18 October 1943; b. 20 October – 4 November 1943; 16th patrol: 15 January – 10 February 1944; 17th patrol: 4 March – 2 April 1944; 18th patrol: 2 – 30 May 1944; 19th patrol: a. 11 July 1944; b. 13 July – 4 August 1944
- Victories: 1 merchant ship sunk (961 GRT); 5 warships sunk (573 tons); 1 merchant ship total loss (7,886 GRT); 1 merchant ship damaged (7.661 GRT)

German submarine U-24 was a Type IIB U-boat that was in service of Nazi Germany's Kriegsmarine during World War II. She was laid down on 21 April 1936 at the F. Krupp Germaniawerft in Kiel with yard number 554, launched on 24 September and commissioned into the Kriegsmarine on 10 October. Oberleutnant zur See Heinz Buchholz took command on 3 July 1937.

== Design ==
German Type IIB submarines were enlarged versions of the original Type IIs. U-24 had a displacement of 279 tonnes (275 long tons) when at the surface and 328 tonnes (323 long tons) while submerged. Officially, the standard tonnage was 250 long tons (254 t), however. The U-boat had a total length of 42.70 m (140 ft 1 in), a pressure hull length of 28.20 m (92 ft 6 in), a beam of 4.08 m (13 ft 5 in), a height of 8.60 m (28 ft 3 in), and a draught of 3.90 m (12 ft 10 in). The submarine was powered by two MWM RS 127 S four-stroke, six-cylinder diesel engines of 700 metric horsepower (510 kW; 690 shp) for cruising, two Siemens-Schuckert PG VV 322/36 double-acting electric motors producing a total of 460 metric horsepower (340 kW; 450 shp) for use while submerged. She had two shafts and two 0.85 m (3 ft) propellers. The boat was capable of operating at depths of up to 80–150 metres (260–490 ft).

The submarine had a maximum surface speed of 12 knots (22 km/h; 14 mph) and a maximum submerged speed of 7 knots (13 km/h; 8.1 mph). When submerged, the boat could operate for 35–42 nautical miles (65–78 km; 40–48 mi) at 4 knots (7.4 km/h; 4.6 mph); when surfaced, she could travel 3,800 nautical miles (7,000 km; 4,400 mi) at 8 knots (15 km/h; 9.2 mph). U-24 was fitted with three 53.3 cm (21 in) torpedo tubes at the bow, five torpedoes or up to twelve Type A torpedo mines, and a 2 cm (0.79 in) anti-aircraft gun. The boat had a complement of twenty-five.

== Fate ==
To serve in the 30th U-boat Flotilla, she was transported in sections along the Danube to the Romanian port of Galați. She was then re-assembled at the Galați shipyard and sent to the Black Sea. On 25 August 1944, U-24 was scuttled at Constanţa, on the Romanian Black Sea coast to prevent the advancing Soviet forces from capturing her. She was raised by the Soviet Union in early 1945, but sunk as target practice by the Soviet submarine M-120 on 26 May 1947, off Sevastopol (also sunk that same day was the former U-18).

== Summary of raiding history ==
Date	Name	Nationality	Tonnage (Note: Merchant ship tonnages are in gross register tons. Military vessels are listed by tons displacement.)	Fate
9 November 1939	Carmarthen Coast	United Kingdom	961	Sunk (mine)
31 March 1943	Kreml	Soviet Union	7,661	Damaged
15 June 1943	BTSC Zashitnik (No 26)	Soviet Navy	441	Sunk
30 July 1943	Emba	Soviet Union	7,886	Total loss
22 August 1943	DB-36	Soviet Navy	16	Sunk
22 August 1943	DB-37	Soviet Navy	16	Sunk
31 October 1943	SKA-088	Soviet Navy	56	Sunk
12 May 1944	SKA-0376	Soviet Navy	44	Sunk

== Bibliography ==
- Busch, Rainer; Röll, Hans-Joachim (1999). German U-boat commanders of World War II : a biographical dictionary. Translated by Brooks, Geoffrey. London, Annapolis, Md: Greenhill Books, Naval Institute Press. ISBN 1-55750-186-6.
- Busch, Rainer; Röll, Hans-Joachim (1999). Deutsche U-Boot-Verluste von September 1939 bis Mai 1945 [German U-boat losses from September 1939 to May 1945]. Der U-Boot-Krieg (in German). Vol. IV. Hamburg, Berlin, Bonn: Mittler. ISBN 3-8132-0514-2.
- Gröner, Erich; Jung, Dieter; Maass, Martin (1991). U-boats and Mine Warfare Vessels. German Warships 1815–1945. Vol. 2. Translated by Thomas, Keith; Magowan, Rachel. London: Conway Maritime Press. ISBN 0-85177-593-4.
