= 30th U-boat Flotilla =

30. Unterseebootsflottille
- Active: Raised 1942, Dissolved 1944
- Country: Nazi Germany
- Branch: Kriegsmarine
- Type: U-boat flotilla
- Garrison/HQ: Constanţa

Commanders
- Notable commanders: Helmut Rosenbaum

30th U-boat Flotilla ("30. Unterseebootsflottille") of Nazi Germany's Kriegsmarine was formed in October 1942. Six U-boats reached the Black Sea after a transport over land and canals and operated from the harbours of Constanţa and Feodosiya from 1942 to 1944.

== History ==
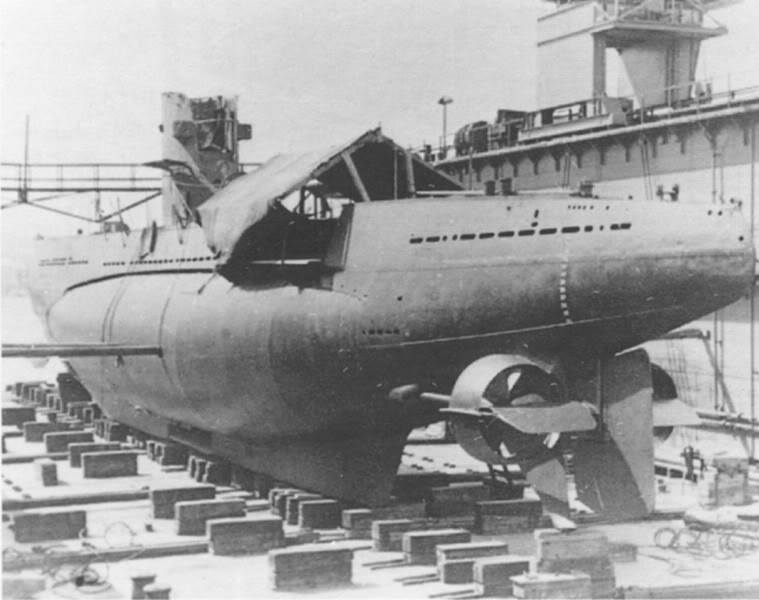
U-18 being re-assembled at Galați, Romania

In the First World War, Imperial German submarines had been transported via rail to the Pola Flotilla based in the Adriatic. With Turkey as an ally of the Central Powers, the Imperial German Navy could also access the Black Sea via the Dardanelles and the Bosphorus, where the Constantinople Flotilla was based.

In 1936, the Montreux Convention Regarding the Regime of the Straits came into effect, and Turkey prevent access of Italian or German ships to the Black Sea in the Second World War. During Operation Barbarossa, the Luftwaffe engaged the Soviet Black Sea Fleet, but at the Romanian Siege of Odessa (1941), the evacuation of the Red Army forces via the sea could not be prevented with the meagre naval forces available. In October 1942, the 30th Flotilla under the command of Kptlt. Helmut Rosenbaum was founded. With Turkey remaining neutral, access via the Bosphorus was not feasible. It was decided that small vessels, torpedo boats and U-boats, should be transported from the German Bight via Elbe, roads and the Danube to the Black Sea. As the old Ludwigskanal was not suitable, transport via land was necessary.

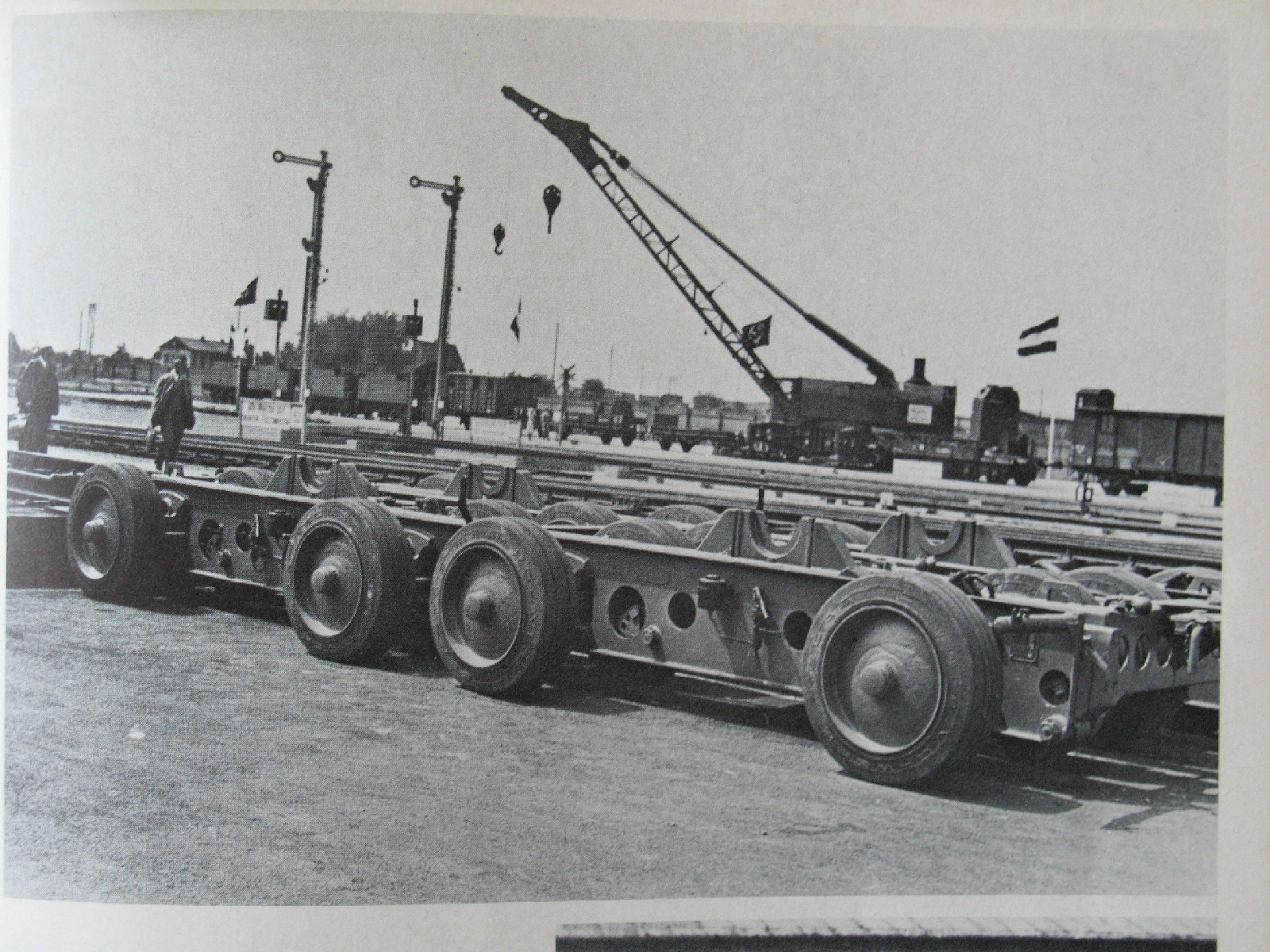
Culemeyer trailer, 1935 in Nuernberg

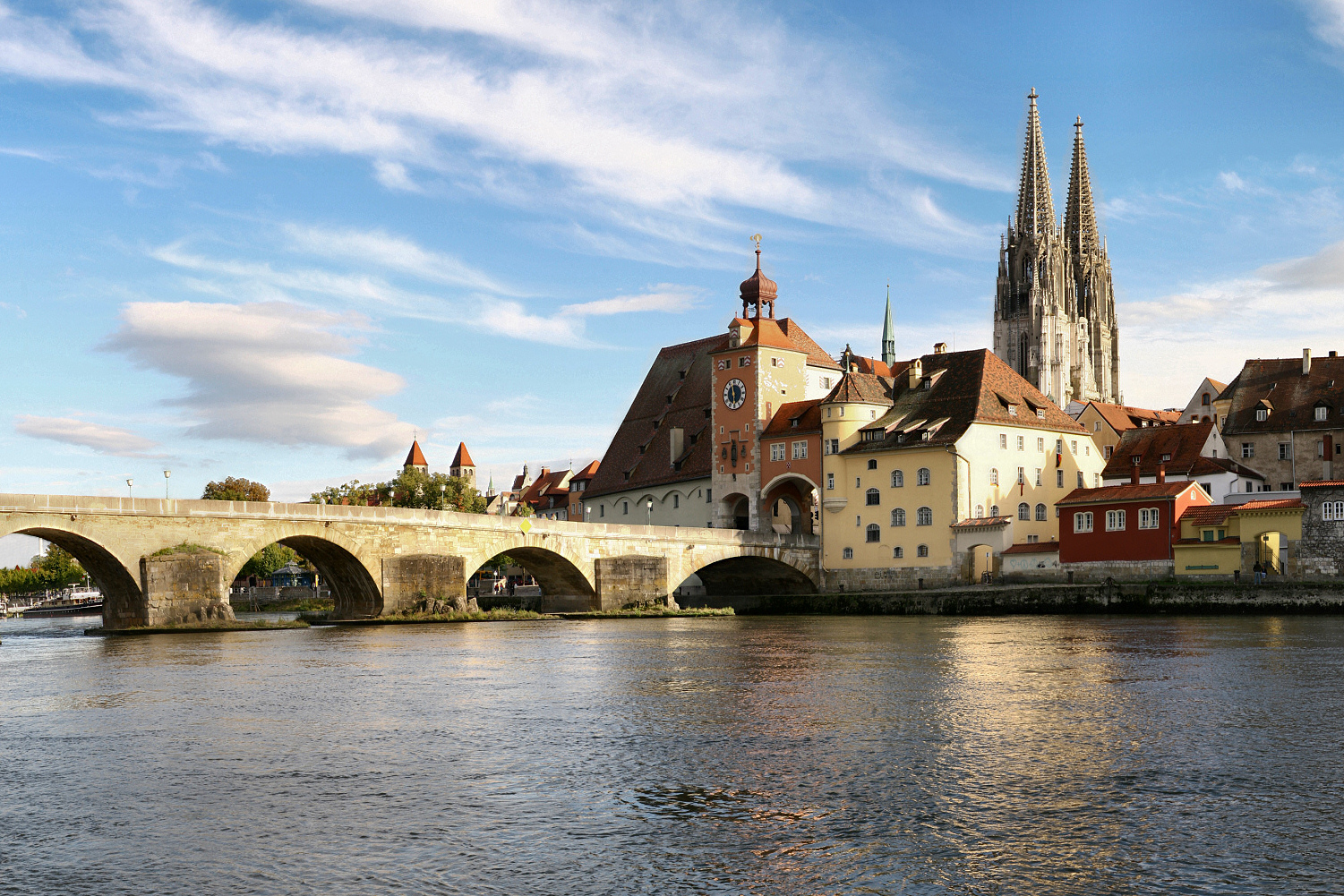
Stone Bridge in Regensburg

Six U-boats of the rather small coastal submarine Type IIB, which at the time served as training vessels in the Baltic Sea, were assigned to this flotilla in being. Starting from May 1942, they were partially dismantled in Kiel, to reduce weight and size. Toppled over 90°, and fitted with additional floating devices, the stripped down hulls, weighing 140 tons, were shipped through the Kiel Canal and on the Elbe up to Dresden-Übigau, where they were placed on two 70 ton Culemeyer road transporters hauled by Kaelble tractors. The boats then traveled at an average speed of 5 mph over the Reichsautobahn (modern day A4 and A9) to the slipway in Ingolstadt. Traveling down the Danube, one obstacle was the old Stone Bridge of Regensburg with its arches. Eventually, the submarines arrived in the Romanian port of Galați where they were re-assembled by the Romanians at the Galați shipyard.

The first boat started to operate from the Romanian port of Constanţa in October 1942, the last joined in May 1943. Despite carrying only five torpedoes, the Type II boats were effective in the Black Sea theatre. In total, 26 ships with 45,426 tons were sunk. U-20 was a lucky boat sinking 15 enemy ships with 38,500 tons without suffering casualties amongst her crew.

When the Romanians switched sides in 1944, U-9, U-18 and U-24 were scuttled near the harbour, and later raised by the Soviets. The Flotilla's history ended in September 1944, when its three last boats U-19, U-20 and U-23 were scuttled on 10 and 11 September near the Turkish coast.

== Flotilla commanders ==
Duration	Commander
October 1942 – April 1944	Kapitänleutnant Helmut Rosenbaum
May 1944 – July 1944	Kapitänleutnant Clemens Schöler
July 1944 – October 1944	Kapitänleutnant Klaus Petersen

== Literature ==
- Gerd Enders: Deutsche U-Boote zum Schwarzen Meer. February 1997, ISBN 3-8132-0520-7
- Gerd Enders: Deutsche U-Boote im Schwarzen Meer. 1984; ISBN 3-7822-0334-8
