= List of main Romanian Navy warships of World War II =

This is a list of main warships operated by the Romanian Navy during the Second World War. It includes major surface warships and submarines. Each surface warship in this list is armed with at least two main guns of a caliber greater than 4 inches (102 mm) or with torpedo tubes, and has a range of over 1,200 km (650 nautical miles). The fore-mentioned range is the minimum required for a journey along the maximum East-West extent of the Black Sea, which amounts to a distance of 1,175 km (730 miles or 635 nautical miles). The Black Sea was the naval front where the Royal Romanian Navy operated throughout the war.

== Major surface warships ==
Destroyers (4) Frigates (1) Torpedo boats (5) Monitors (7)
Class	Picture	Type	Origin	Ships	Displacement (standard)	Note
Regele Carol I-class		Seaplane tender/Minelayer	United Kingdom	Regele Carol I	2,653 tons	Built in Glasgow as passenger steamer and commissioned in 1898, converted to seaplane tender and minelayer in 1916 and sunk in October 1941
Regele Ferdinand-class		Destroyer	Italy	Regele Ferdinand; Regina Maria	1,422 tons	Built in Italy in the early 1930s
Vifor-class		Destroyer	Italy	Mărăști; Mărășești	1,432 tons	Built in Italy during the First World War
Amiral Murgescu-class		Minelaying frigate	Romania	Amiral Murgescu	812 tons	Largest Romanian-built warship of the Second World War
250t-class		Torpedo boat	Austria-Hungary	Năluca; Sborul; Smeul	262 tons	Built in Austria-Hungary during the First World War
No. 10-class		Fast attack craft	Nazi Germany	No. 10; No. 11; No. 12; No. 13	65 tons	German motor torpedo boats with a range of 700-750 nautical miles, acquired on 14 August 1944
Brătianu-class		Monitor	Austria-Hungary; Romania	Mihail Kogălniceanu; Lascăr Catargiu; Ion Brătianu; Alexandru Lahovari	650 tons	Built in sections in Austria-Hungary then assembled and launched in Romania between 1907 and 1908
Sava-class		Monitor	Austria-Hungary	Bucovina	580 tons	Built in Austria-Hungary during the First World War
Enns-class		Monitor	Austria-Hungary	Basarabia	540 tons	Built in Austria-Hungary during the First World War
Temes-class		Monitor	Austria-Hungary	Ardeal	442 tons	Built in Austria-Hungary during the First World War

== Submarines ==
Fleet submarines (3) Midget submarines (5)
Class	Picture	Type	Origin	Ships	Displacement (standard)	Note
Delfinul-class		Submarine	Italy	Delfinul	650 tons	Unique submarine built in Italy for the Romanian Navy, commissioned in 1936
Marsuinul-class		Submarine	Romania	Marsuinul	620 tons	Unique submarine built in Romania, laid down in 1938 and commissioned in 1943
Rechinul-class		Submarine	Romania	Rechinul	585 tons	Unique minelaying submarine built in Romania, laid down in 1938 and commissioned in 1943
CB-class		Midget submarine	Italy	CB-1; CB-2; CB-3; CB-4; CB-6	35 tons	Italian midget submarines captured in late 1943

== Bibliography ==
- Twardowski, Marek (1980). "Romania". In Chesneau, Roger (ed.). Conway's All the World's Fighting Ships 1922–1946. London: Conway Maritime Press. pp. 359–362. ISBN 0-85177-146-7.
