= List of Romanian Navy destroyers of World War II =

During the Second World War, the Romanian Navy operated four destroyers, one large escort ship comparable to American destroyer escorts plus one sea-going torpedo boat. These vessels fought against the Soviet Navy during most of the war, the last one being decommissioned in 1988.

== Destroyers ==
=== Mărăști class ===
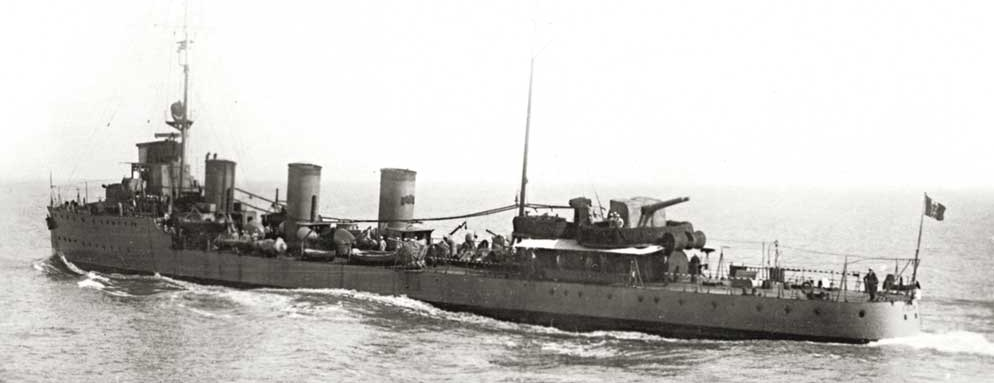
NMS Mărăști

The two destroyers of the Mărăști class, previously known as the Vifor class, were ordered in 1913 by Romania from the Pattison Shipyard in Italy, together with two more ships that would not be delivered. According to the Romanian specifications, the four vessels were to be large destroyers armed with three 120 mm guns, four 75 mm guns and five torpedo tubes. However, when Italy joined the war in June 1915, the four ships were requisitioned by the Italian Navy and completed as scout cruisers (esploratori), armed with three 152 mm guns, four 76 mm guns, two machine guns and two twin 457 mm torpedo tubes. Each ship measured 94.7 meters in length, with a beam of 9.5 meters and a draught of 3.6 meters. Power plant consisted of Tosi turbines and five Thornycroft boilers, generating a designed output of 40,000 hp powering two shafts, which gave each warship a designed top speed of 34 knots. However, this actually oscillated between 35 and 38 knots, depending on the vessel. Each ship had a complement of 146, with ranges of 1,700 nautical miles at 15 knots and 380 nautical miles at 34 knots. Wartime standard displacement amounted to 1,410 tons with a full load displacement of 1,723 tons. After a brief career in the Italian Navy, two of these warships were ultimately received by Romania in 1920, with the names Mărăști and Mărășești. Despite retaining their cruiser-typical firepower, the two ships were officially rated as destroyers by the Romanian Navy. Mărăști and Mărășești were refitted at the Galați shipyard in Romania in 1925, and sent back to Naples for rearming in 1926. The two rearmed warships are also known as the Mărăști-class. As of 1939, when the Second World War started, their artillery approached cruiser standards, amounting to nine heavy naval guns (five of 120 mm and four of 76 mm). In addition, they retained their two twin 457 mm torpedo tubes as well as two machine guns, plus the capacity to carry up to 50 mines. They thus became the most heavily armed warships in the history of the Royal Romanian Navy, apart from the battleship Potemkin, which was de facto under Romanian control for a brief time in July 1905. All these guns increased their standard displacement to 1,460 tons. Three of these heavy guns (one 120 mm and two 76 mm) were removed in order to make room for two 37 mm and four 20 mm anti-aircraft guns plus two depth charge throwers (one of 900 mm and one of 330 mm). Despite having their heavy armament reduced to destroyer standards, the two warships still presented some cruiser characteristics, such as retaining their torpedo tubes mounted on the broadsides instead of the centerline.

=== Regele Ferdinand class ===
The two destroyers of this class were also built in Italy for the Romanian Navy. They were laid down in 1927, launched in 1928 and commissioned in 1930. The design was based on the British Shakespeare-class destroyer leaders. However, they differed in that the turbines were in echelon layout. The guns were supplied by Bofors and the fire control equipment by Siemens. The Romanians wished to order two more vessels but could not afford to do so due to economic problems. The two ships of the Regele Ferdinand class were 101.90 metres (334 ft 4 in) long overall, with a beam of 9.60 metres (31 ft 6 in) and draught of 3.51 metres (11 ft 6 in). Each destroyer a complement of 212. The vessels were powered by 4 Thornycroft type boilers giving an output of 36,000 kW (48,000 hp). This powered two shaft Parsons type geared turbines placed in echelon layout, which gave the ships a maximum speed of 35 knots (65 km/h; 40 mph) and a range of 3,000 nautical miles (5,600 km; 3,500 mi) at 15 knots (28 km/h; 17 mph). Each of the two warships displaced 1,400 tons standard with a full load displacement amounting to 1,850 tons. When Romania joined the war against the USSR in June 1941, the two destroyers were each armed with five 120-millimetre (4.7 in) Bofors naval guns in single mounts, one 76 mm (3 in) naval/AA gun, two German 37 mm anti-aircraft guns, two twin 13 mm machine guns, two triple 533 mm torpedo tubes and two depth charge throwers. During the war, the Romanians replaced the 76 mm gun and one of the 120 mm guns with four 40 mm and eight 20 mm anti-aircraft guns.

== Similar warships ==
=== Sea-going torpedo boat ===
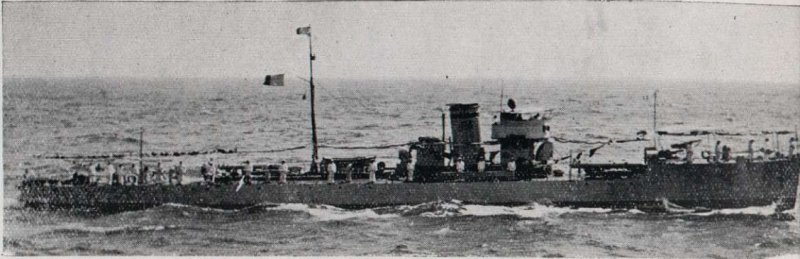
NMS Sborul

A vessel of the T-group of the 250t-class, Sborul was built by STT at the Port of Trieste. Under the designation 81 T, she was laid down on 6 February 1914, launched on 6 August that year and commissioned on 1 December. She had a waterline length of 58.2 m (190 ft 11 in), a beam of 5.7 m (18 ft 8 in), and a normal draught of 1.5 m (4 ft 11 in). While her designed displacement was 262 tonnes (258 long tons), she displaced about 320 tonnes (310 long tons) fully loaded. The crew consisted of 39 officers and enlisted men. Her Parsons turbines were rated at 5,000 shp (3,700 kW) with a maximum output of 6,000 shp (4,500 kW), enabling her to reach a top speed of 28 knots (52 km/h; 32 mph). She carried 18 tonnes (17.7 long tons) of coal and 24 tonnes (23.6 long tons) of fuel oil, which gave her a range of 980 nmi (1,810 km; 1,130 mi) at 16 knots (30 km/h; 18 mph). Under the provisions of the Treaty of Saint-Germain-en-Laye, she was given as reparations to Romania in 1920, along with six more boats of the same class. Notably, Sborul was the only Romanian torpedo boat of the Second World War to still have her torpedo tubes. Along with the destroyers Mărăști and Mărășești, she was the only warship of the Romanian Navy to use 450 mm torpedoes, as opposed to most of the other vessels which used 533 mm torpedoes. Her armament consisted of two 66 mm naval guns, two 20 mm anti-aircraft guns and two 450 mm torpedo tubes.

=== Destroyer escort ===
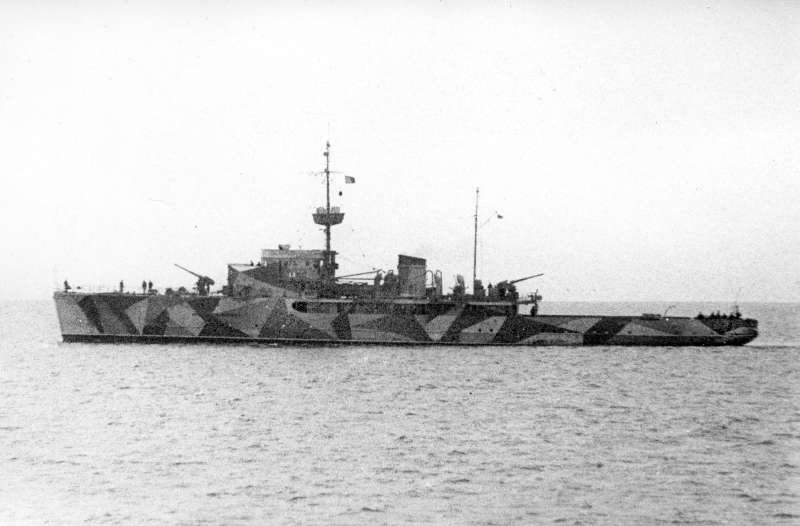
NMS Amiral Murgescu

Between 1938 and 1941, Romania built and commissioned one minelayer which was also fitted for use as a convoy escort, her dimensions and armament being very similar to those of American destroyer escorts, particularly the torpedo-less Evarts-class. Named Amiral Murgescu, she was laid down on 1 August 1938 and launched on 14 June 1939. Her commissioning took place on 2 March 1941. Her full-load displacement amounted to 1,068 tons while her standard displacement was of 812 tons. She measured 76.9 meters in length, with a beam of 9.1 meters and a draught of 2.5 meters. She was armed with two 105 mm SK C/32 dual-purpose naval/AA guns, two Rheinmetall 37 mm guns, four Oerlikon 20 mm guns and two twin 13 mm machine guns. She was also fitted with two depth charge throwers and could carry up to 200 mines and depth charges (135 mines and 65 depth charges). Her two main guns were initially protected by gun shields, however these were removed in July 1941 in order to facilitate anti-aircraft fire. Amiral Murgescu had a crew of up to 135 and was powered by two Krupp diesel engines generating 1,050 horse power each, giving her a top speed of 16 knots and a range of 3,400 nautical miles. Four ships of this class were planned, but only Amiral Murgescu was completed.

== Actions ==
- Raid on Constanța
- Evacuation of the Crimea
