= Romanian ship Regina Maria =

Regina Maria was the name of at least two ships of the Romanian Navy and may refer to:

- NMS Regina Maria, a Regele Ferdinand-class destroyer launched in 1929. She was seized in 1944 by the Soviet Union and renamed Letuchiy before being returned to Romania in 1951 when she was renamed D22 before being stricken in 1961
- Romanian frigate Regina Maria (F222), formerly the Type 22 frigate HMS London, acquired in 2003 and renamed
