= Romanian ship Regele Ferdinand =

Regele Ferdinand was the name of at least two ships of the Romanian Navy and may refer to:

- NMS Regele Ferdinand, a Regele Ferdinand-class destroyer launched in 1928. She was seized in 1944 by the Soviet Union and renamed Likhoy before being returned to Romania in 1951 when she was renamed D21 before being stricken in 1961
- Romanian frigate Regele Ferdinand (F221), formerly the Type 22 frigate HMS Coventry, acquired in 2003 and renamed
