= NMS Regina Maria =

Romanian Navy's Regele Ferdinand-class destroyer

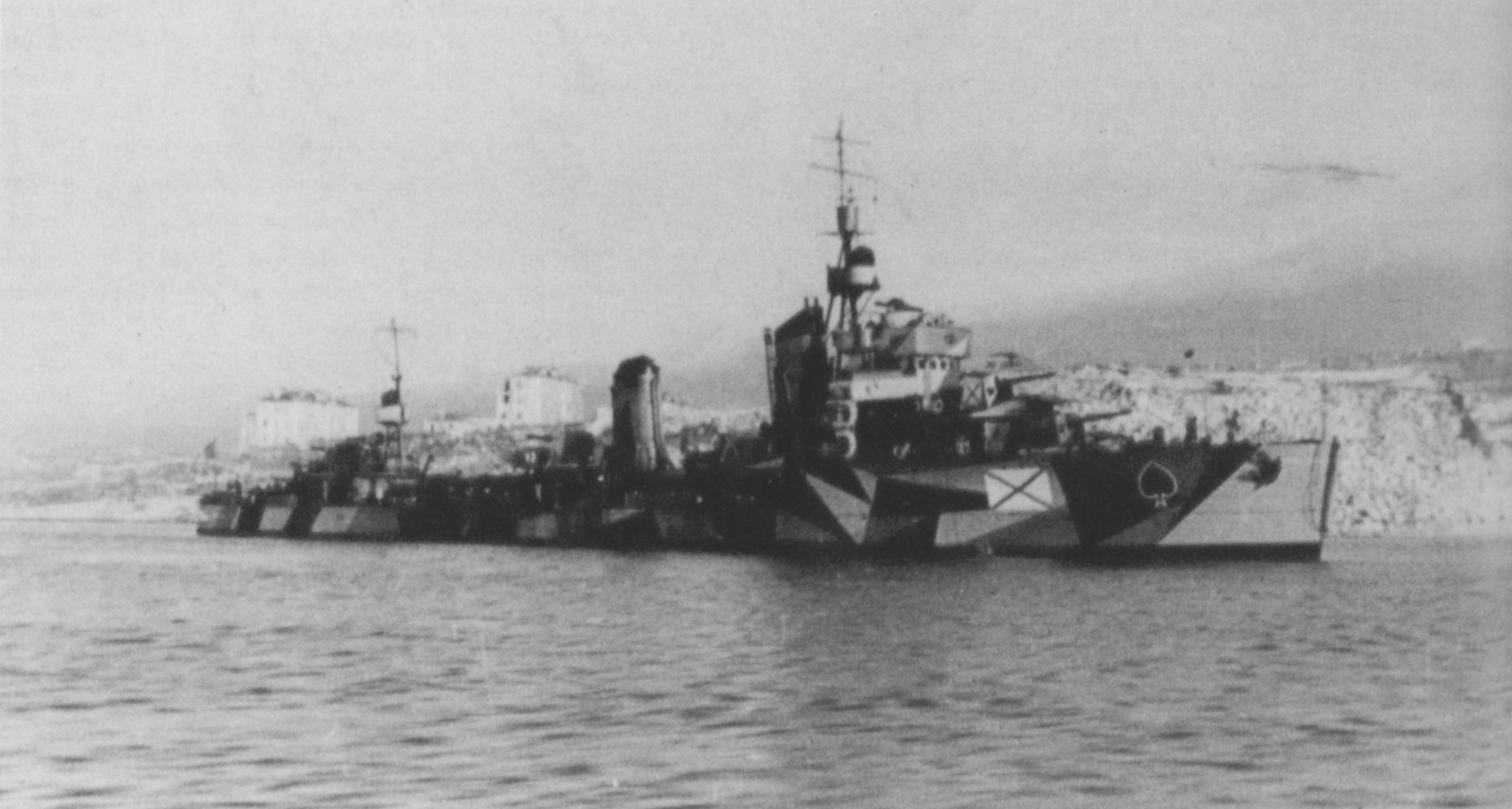
- Regina Maria off Sevastopol, 1944

History

Romania
- Name: Regina Maria
- Namesake: Queen Marie of Romania
- Ordered: 13 November 1926
- Builder: Pattison Yard, Naples, Italy
- Laid down: 1927
- Launched: 2 March 1929
- Commissioned: 7 September 1930
- Fate: Seized by the Soviet Union, 5 September 1944

Soviet Union
- Name: Letuchiy (Летучий)
- Namesake: Russian word for "flying", an allusion to the Flying Dutchman (Letuchiy gollándets)
- Acquired: 5 September 1944
- Commissioned: 20 October 1944
- Stricken: 3 July 1951
- Fate: Returned to Romania, 24 June 1951

People's Republic of Romania
- Acquired: 24 June 1951
- Renamed: D22, 1952
- Stricken: April 1961
- Fate: Scrapped, after April 1961

General characteristics (as built)
- Class & type: Regele Ferdinand-class destroyer
- Displacement: 1,400 long tons (1,422 t) (standard); 1,850 long tons (1,880 t) (full load)
- Length: 101.9 m (334 ft 4 in) (o/a)
- Beam: 9.6 m (31 ft 6 in)
- Draught: 3.51 m (11 ft 6 in)
- Installed power: 4 Thornycroft boilers; 52,000 shp (39,000 kW)
- Propulsion: 2 shafts; 2 geared steam turbines
- Speed: 37 knots (69 km/h; 43 mph)
- Range: 3,000 nmi (5,600 km; 3,500 mi) at 15 knots (28 km/h; 17 mph)
- Complement: 212
- Armament: 5 × single 120 mm (4.7 in) guns; 1 × single 76 mm (3 in) AA gun; 2 × single 40 mm (1.6 in) AA guns; 2 × triple 533 mm (21 in) torpedo tubes; 40 depth charges; 50 mines

NMS Regina Maria was the second and last of the two Regele Ferdinand-class destroyers built in Italy for the Romanian Navy in the late 1920s. After the Axis invasion of the Soviet Union on 22 June 1941 (Operation Barbarossa), she took part in the Raid on Constanța a few days later and may have damaged a Soviet destroyer leader during the battle. The powerful Soviet Black Sea Fleet heavily outnumbered Axis naval forces in the Black Sea and the Romanian destroyers were limited to escort duties in the western half of the Black Sea during the war. In early 1944 the Soviets were able to cut off and surround the port of Sevastopol on the Crimean Peninsula. Regina Maria covered convoys evacuating Axis troops from Sevastopol in May and rescued several hundred herself.

In August that year Romania switched sides, but despite that the Soviets seized the Romanian ships and incorporated them into the Soviet Navy. Renamed Letuchiy, the ship served until she was struck from the navy list in 1951 when she was returned to the Romanians who renamed her D22 in 1952. The ship was discarded in 1961 and subsequently scrapped.

== Background and design ==
Following the end of World War I and the re-purchase of two Aquila-class cruisers from Italy, the Romanian Government decided to order also two modern destroyers from the Pattison Yard in Italy, as part of the 1927 Naval Programme. The design was based on the British Shakespeare-class destroyer leaders, but differed in the arrangement of their propulsion machinery. The guns were imported from Sweden and the fire-control system from Germany. Four destroyers were intended to be ordered, but only two were actually built.

The Regele Ferdinand-class ships had an overall length of 101.9 metres (334 ft 4 in), a beam of 9.6 metres (31 ft 6 in), and a mean draught of 3.51 metres (11 ft 6 in). They displaced 1,400 long tons (1,422 t) at standard load and 1,850 long tons (1,880 t) at deep load. Their crew numbered 212 officers and sailors. The ships were powered by two Parsons geared steam turbines, each driving a single propeller, using steam provided by four Thornycroft boilers. The turbines were designed to produce 52,000 shaft horsepower (39,000 kW) for a speed of 37 knots (69 km/h; 43 mph), (Note: Twardowski says 48,000 shp (36,000 kW) and a speed of 35 knots (65 km/h; 40 mph).) although the Regele Ferdinands reached 38 knots (70 km/h; 44 mph) during their sea trials. They could carry 480 long tons (490 t) of fuel oil which gave them a range of 3,000 nautical miles (5,600 km; 3,500 mi) at a speed of 15 knots (28 km/h; 17 mph).

The main armament of the Regele Ferdinand-class ships consisted of five 50-calibre Bofors 120-millimetre (4.7 in) guns in single mounts, two superfiring pairs fore and aft of the superstructure and one gun aft of the rear funnel. For anti-aircraft defense, they were equipped with one Bofors 76-millimetre (3 in) anti-aircraft (AA) gun between the funnels and a pair of 40-millimetre (1.6 in) AA guns. The ships were fitted with two triple mounts for 533-millimetre (21 in) torpedo tubes and could carry 50 mines and 40 depth charges. They were equipped with a Siemens fire-control system which included a pair of rangefinders, one each for the fore and aft guns.

=== Modifications ===
The 40-millimetre guns were replaced by two German 3.7-centimetre (1.5 in) AA guns and a pair of French 13.2-millimetre (0.52 in) M1929 Hotchkiss machineguns were added in 1939. Two Italian depth charge throwers were later installed. During World War II, the 76-millimetre gun was replaced by four 20-millimetre (0.79 in) AA guns. In 1943, the two ships were equipped with a German S-Gerät sonar. The following year, the upper forward 120-millimetre gun was replaced by a German 88-millimetre (3.5 in) AA gun. German 88-millimetre guns in Romanian service were themselves modified by being fitted with Romanian-produced barrel liners.

== Construction and career ==
Regina Maria, named after Queen Marie of Romania, was ordered on 13 November 1926 and was laid down by Pattison in 1927 at their shipyard in Naples, Italy. She was launched on 2 March 1929 and commissioned on 7 September 1930 after arriving in Romania. The ship was assigned to the Destroyer Squadron, which was visited by King Carol II of Romania and the Prime Minister, Nicolae Iorga, on 27 May 1931. Queen Marie visited her namesake on 22 June 1932 which made a short cruise to Balchik, Bulgaria, that same day. Regina Maria participated in the Coronation Fleet review for King George VI on 19 May 1937 at Spithead.

A few days after the invasion of the Soviet Union (Operation Barbarossa) on 22 June 1941, a pair of Leningrad-class destroyer leaders, Moskva and Kharkov, began bombarding Constanța in the early hours of 26 June. The Romanians were expecting a Soviet raid and their defences, consisting of Regina Maria, the flotilla leader Mărăști and the heavy guns of the German coastal artillery battery Tirpitz, were prepared to engage the Soviet ships. In ten minutes, starting from 03:58, Moskva and Kharkov fired no less than 350 shells from their 130 mm (5.1 in) guns. The two Romanian warships returned fire with their 120 mm (4.7 in) guns at distances between 11,000 to 16,000 m (12,000 to 17,000 yd), but only knocked Moskva's mainmast down. The two Soviet ships were silhouetted against the dawn while the Romanian ships were hidden by the coast behind them. The heavy and accurate Axis fire caused Moskva and Kharkov to begin to withdraw while laying down a smoke screen. As they fell back they entered a Romanian minefield and Moskva sank after striking a mine.

Massively outnumbered by the Black Sea Fleet, the Romanian ships were kept behind the minefields defending Constanța for the next several months, training for convoy escort operations. Beginning on 5 October, the Romanians began laying minefields to defend the route between the Bosphorus and Constanța. The minelayers were protected by the destroyers; the submarine L-4 fired two torpedoes at Regina Maria that same day, but missed. After the evacuation of Odessa on 16 October, the Romanians began to clear the Soviet mines defending the port and to lay their own minefields protecting the route between Constanța and Odessa. On 1 December Regina Maria, her sister ship Regele Ferdinand and Mărăști were escorting a convoy to Odessa when a submarine (Note: Variously identified as D-4 or M-58.) unsuccessfully attacked the convoy. It was quickly spotted and depth charged by Regina Maria and Regele Ferdinand with the latter claiming a kill. Soviet records do not acknowledge any losses on that date. Regina Maria and Regele Ferdinand escorted another convoy to Odessa on 16–17 December, the last one before ice closed the port.

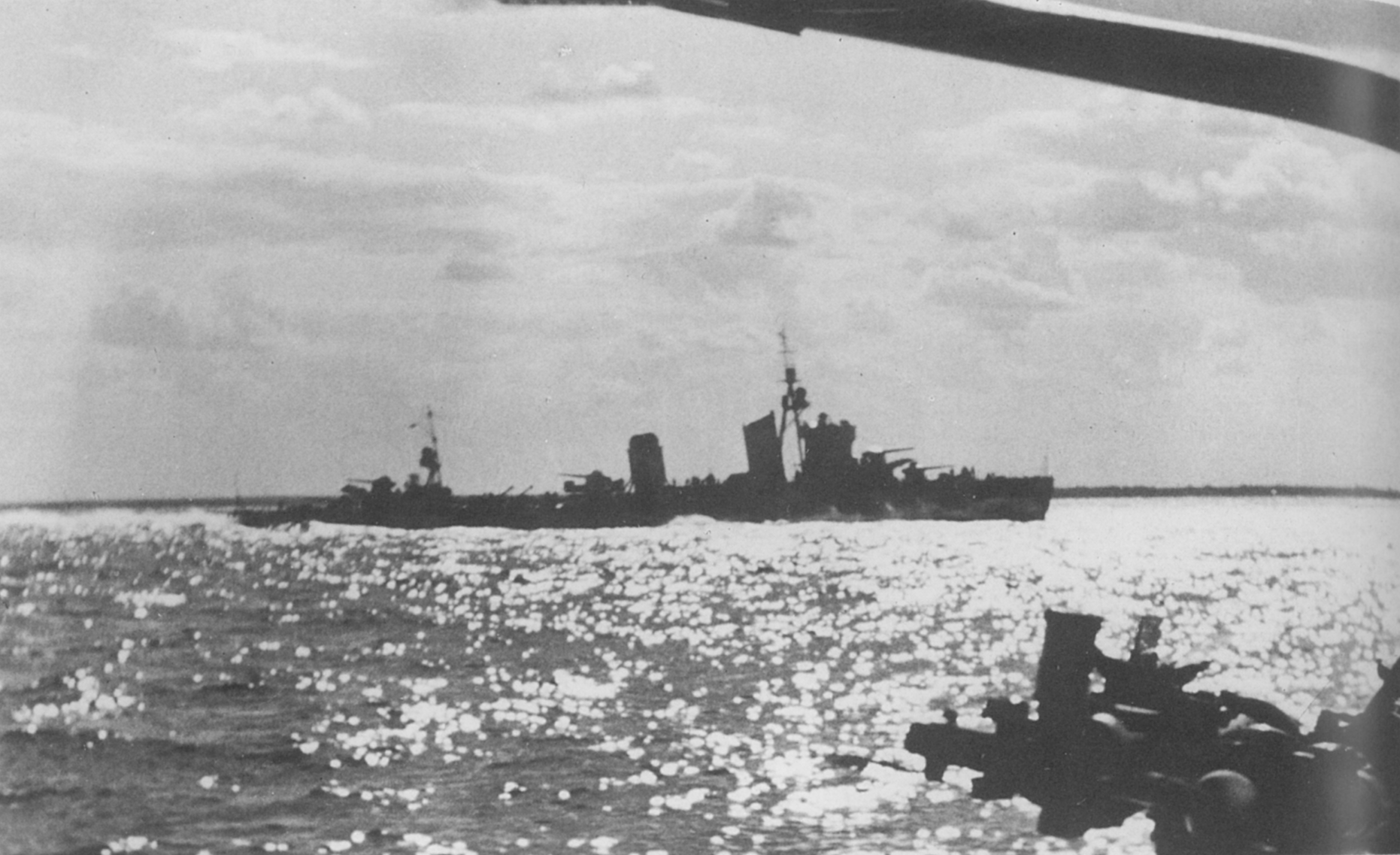
Regina Maria in 1942

On 20 April 1942, after the ice had melted, Regina Maria, Mărăști and her sister Mărășești escorted the first convoy to Ochakov, although the Romanian destroyers were generally used to escort ships between the Bosphorus and Constanța. On the nights of 22/23 and 24/25 June, Regina Maria, Regele Ferdinand and Mărășești covered the laying of defensive minefields off Odessa. After Sevastopol surrendered on 4 July, a direct route between the port and Constanța was opened in October and operated year-round. On 14 November the German 2,793-gross register ton (GRT) oil tanker SS Ossag was torpedoed and damaged by the submarine L-23 at the entrance to the Bosphorus as she was being met by the sisters.

On 20 April 1943, the submarine S-33 sank the largest freighter in the Romanian merchant marine, the 6,876 GRT SS Suceava, despite her escort of Regina Maria and three German minesweepers. On the night of 9/10 November, Regina Maria and Regele Ferdinand escorted minelayers as they laid a minefield off Sevastopol.

Successful Soviet attacks in early 1944 cut the overland connection of the Crimea with the rest of Ukraine and necessitated its supply by sea. In early April another offensive occupied most of the peninsula and encircled Sevastopol. The Romanians began evacuating the city on 14 April, with their destroyers covering the troop convoys. Four days later, the 5,700 GRT cargo ship SS Alba Julia was unsuccessfully attacked by the submarines L-6 and L-4. Shortly after the latter submarine missed with her pair of torpedoes, the freighter was bombed and set on fire by Soviet aircraft. Other ships rescued her passengers and crew after they abandoned ship, but Regina Maria and Regele Ferdinand were dispatched to see if she could be salvaged. They put a skeleton crew aboard to operate her pumps and to stabilise her before a pair of tugboats arrived the next morning to tow her to Constanța. Adolf Hitler suspended the evacuation on 27 April, but relented on 8 May after further Soviet attacks further endangered the Axis forces in Sevastopol as they closed within artillery range of the harbour. Regina Maria made two trips to evacuate Axis troops and was part of the last convoy to reach Sevastopol on the night of 11/12 May. Together with the minelayers Amiral Murgescu and Dacia, she rescued 800 men that night. Regina Maria and Mărășești covered the minelayers as they sealed off the gap that led to Sevastopol in the minefields defending Sulina on the night of 25/26 May.

After King Michael's Coup on 23 August, Romania declared war on the Axis powers. Regina Maria remained in harbour until she was seized by the Soviets on 5 September together with the rest of the Romanian Navy. Before being renamed Letuchiy on 20 October, the ship was commissioned into the Soviet Navy on 14 September as part of the Black Sea Fleet, along with her sister. She was struck from the navy list on 3 July 1951 after she had been returned to Romania with her sister on 24 June. The sisters rejoined Mărăști and Mărășești when they were assigned to the Destroyer Squadron upon their return. Regina Maria was renamed D22 when the Romanian destroyers were assigned numbers when the Destroyer Division was redesignated as the 418th Destroyer Division in 1952. The ship continued to serve until April 1961, when she was discarded and subsequently scrapped.

== Bibliography ==
- Axworthy, Mark (1995). Third Axis, Fourth Ally: Romanian Armed Forces in the European War, 1941–1945. London: Arms and Armour Press. ISBN 1-85409-267-7.
- Berezhnoy, Sergey (1994). Трофеи и репарации ВМФ СССР [Trophies and reparations of the Soviet Navy] (in Russian). Yakutsk: Sakhapoligrafizdat. OCLC 33334505.
- Budzbon, Przemysław; Radziemski, Jan & Twardowski, Marek (2022). Warships of the Soviet Fleets 1939–1945. Vol. I: Major Combatants. Annapolis, Maryland: Naval Institute Press. ISBN 978-1-68247-877-6.
- Hervieux, Pierre (2001). "The Romanian Navy at War, 1941–1945". In Preston, Antony (ed.). Warship 2001–2002. London: Conway Maritime Press. pp. 70–88. ISBN 0-85177-901-8.
- Rohwer, Jürgen (2005). Chronology of the War at Sea 1939–1945: The Naval History of World War Two (Third Revised ed.). Annapolis, Maryland: Naval Institute Press. ISBN 1-59114-119-2.
- Rohwer, Jürgen & Monakov, Mikhail S. (2001). Stalin's Ocean-Going Fleet: Soviet Naval Strategy and Shipbuilding Programs 1935–1953. London: Frank Cass. ISBN 0-7146-4895-7.
- Twardowski, Marek (1980). "Romania". In Chesneau, Roger (ed.). Conway's All the World's Fighting Ships 1922–1946. Greenwich, UK: Conway Maritime Press. pp. 359–362. ISBN 0-85177-146-7.
- Whitley, M. J. (2000). Destroyers of World War Two: An International Encyclopedia. London: Cassell & Co. ISBN 1-85409-521-8.
