= NMS Mărășești =

Romanian Navy Vifor-class destroyer

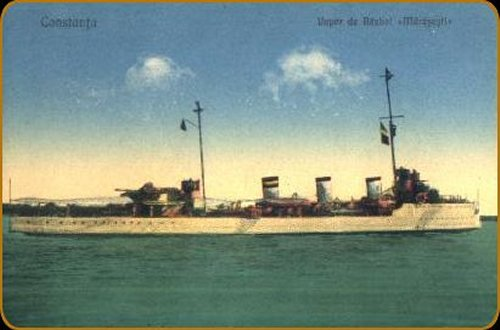
- A postcard of Mărășești

History

Kingdom of Romania
- Name: Vârtej
- Namesake: Whirlwind
- Operator: Royal Romanian Navy (planned)
- Ordered: 1913
- Builder: Cantiere Pattison, Naples, Kingdom of Italy
- Laid down: 15 July 1914
- Fate: Requisitioned by Kingdom of Italy 5 June 1915

Kingdom of Italy
- Name: Nibbio
- Namesake: Kite, a bird of prey
- Acquired: 5 June 1915
- Launched: 30 January 1918
- Commissioned: 15 May 1918
- Fate: Sold to Romania 1 July 1920

Kingdom of Romania
- Name: Mărășești
- Namesake: Battle of Mărășești
- Operator: Royal Romanian Navy
- Acquired: 1 July 1920
- Commissioned: 1 July 1920
- Fate: Seized by the Soviet Union 5 September 1944

Soviet Union
- Name: Mărășești
- Namesake: Previous name retained
- Acquired: 5 September 1944
- Commissioned: 14 September 1944
- Renamed: Lyogkiy 20 October 1944
- Namesake: Nimble
- Stricken: 12 October 1945
- Fate: Returned to Romania 12 October 1945

People's Republic of Romania
- Name: Mărășești
- Namesake: Battle of Mărășești (previous name restored)
- Acquired: 12 October 1945
- Renamed: D11, 1952
- Fate: Discarded April 1961; Scrapped

General characteristics (as built)
- Class & type: Vifor-class destroyer
- Displacement: 1,594 long tons (1,620 t) (normal); 1,760 long tons (1,790 t) (full load)
- Length: 94.7 m (310 ft 8 in) (o/a)
- Beam: 9.5 m (31 ft 2 in)
- Draft: 3.6 m (11 ft 10 in)
- Installed power: 4 Thornycroft boilers; 40,000 shp (30,000 kW)
- Propulsion: 2 shafts; 2 geared steam turbines
- Speed: 34 knots (63 km/h; 39 mph)
- Range: 3,000 nmi (5,600 km; 3,500 mi) at 15 knots (28 km/h; 17 mph)
- Complement: 146
- Armament: 3 × single 152 mm (6.0 in) guns; 4 × single 76 mm (3.0 in) AA guns; 2 × twin 457 mm (17.7 in) torpedo tubes; 24 mines

NMS Mărășești was one of four Vifor-class destroyers ordered by Romania shortly before the beginning of the First World War from Italy. All four sister ships were requisitioned when Italy joined the war in 1915. Originally named Vârtej by the Romanians, she was renamed Nibbio and classified as a scout cruiser in Italian service. Not completed until mid-1918, the ship took part in the Adriatic campaign of World War I but engaged Austro-Hungarian Navy ships in the Adriatic Sea only once before the war ended in November 1918. She was renamed Mărășești when she was re-purchased by the Romanians in 1920.

After Romania entered World War II with the Axis invasion of the Soviet Union on 22 June 1941 (Operation Barbarossa), Mărășești was limited to escort duties in the western half of the Black Sea during the war by the Soviet Navy's powerful Black Sea Fleet, which heavily outnumbered Axis naval forces there. The ship claimed to have sunk a Soviet submarine during the war, but this has not been confirmed by post-war research. In early 1944 the Soviets were able to cut off and surround the port of Sevastopol on the Crimean Peninsula; Mărășești escorted convoys evacuating Axis troops from the port and rescued some troops herself in May 1944.

In August 1944, Romania surrendered to the Soviet Union and switched sides, joining the Allies, but despite this the Soviets seized Mărășești and incorporated her into the Soviet Navy. Renamed Lyogkiy, the ship only served for a year before she was returned to the Romanians, who once again named her Mărășești. They renamed her D11 in 1952. She was discarded in April 1961 and subsequently scrapped.

== Design and description ==
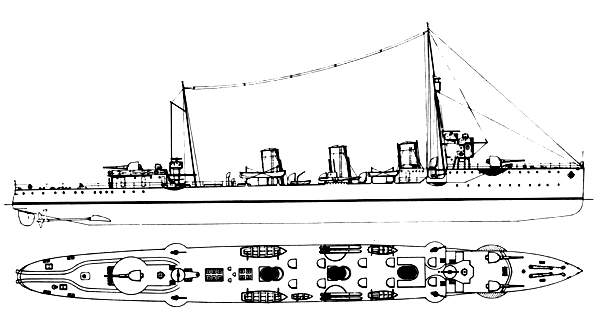
Plan and right elevation line drawing of the Vifor-class destroyers as completed as scout cruisers for the Italian Regia Marina (Royal Navy).

The Vifor-class destroyers were ordered in 1913 by Romania from the Pattison Shipyard in Italy, as part of the 1912 Naval Program. They were to be armed with three 120 mm (4.7 in) guns, four 75 mm (3.0 in) guns, five 45 cm (17.7 in) torpedo tubes and have a 10-hour endurance at full speed. Three ships had been laid down by the time Italy joined the Allied side in World War I on 23 May 1915 by declaring war on Austria-Hungary. The Italians requisitioned the Romanian ships on 5 June 1915, redesignating them as Aquila-class scout cruisers (esploratori). By this time Vârtej approximately 20 percent complete and was renamed Nibbio.

The ships had an overall length of 94.7 meters (310 ft 8 in), had a beam of 9.5 meters (31 ft 2 in), and a draft of 3.6 meters (11 ft 10 in). They displaced 1,594 long tons (1,620 t) at normal load and 1,760 long tons (1,790 t) at deep load. Their crew numbered 9 officers and 137 sailors. The ships were powered by two Tosi steam turbines, each driving a single propeller, using steam provided by five Thornycroft boilers. The turbines were designed to produce 40,000 shaft horsepower (30,000 kW) for a speed of 34 knots (63 km/h; 39 mph), although Nibbio reached 37.4 knots (69.3 km/h; 43.0 mph) during her sea trials from 39,500 shp (29,500 kW). The scouts carried enough fuel oil to give them a range of 1,700 nautical miles (3,100 km; 2,000 mi) at a speed of 15 knots (28 km/h; 17 mph).

The Italians initially intended to arm the ships with seven 120 mm guns and two pairs of twin mounts for 45 cm torpedo tubes, but they changed the gun armament to three 152 mm (6.0 in) and four 76 mm weapons to outgun their nearest Austro-Hungarian equivalents, the Admiral Spaun and Novara-class scout cruisers. Two of the 152 mm guns were mounted side-by-side on the forecastle and the third gun was mounted on the aft superstructure. The 76 mm anti-aircraft (AA) guns were positioned two on each broadside. The torpedo mounts were abreast the middle funnel, one on each broadside. Unlike her sisters, Nibbio could only carry 24 mines.

== Construction ==
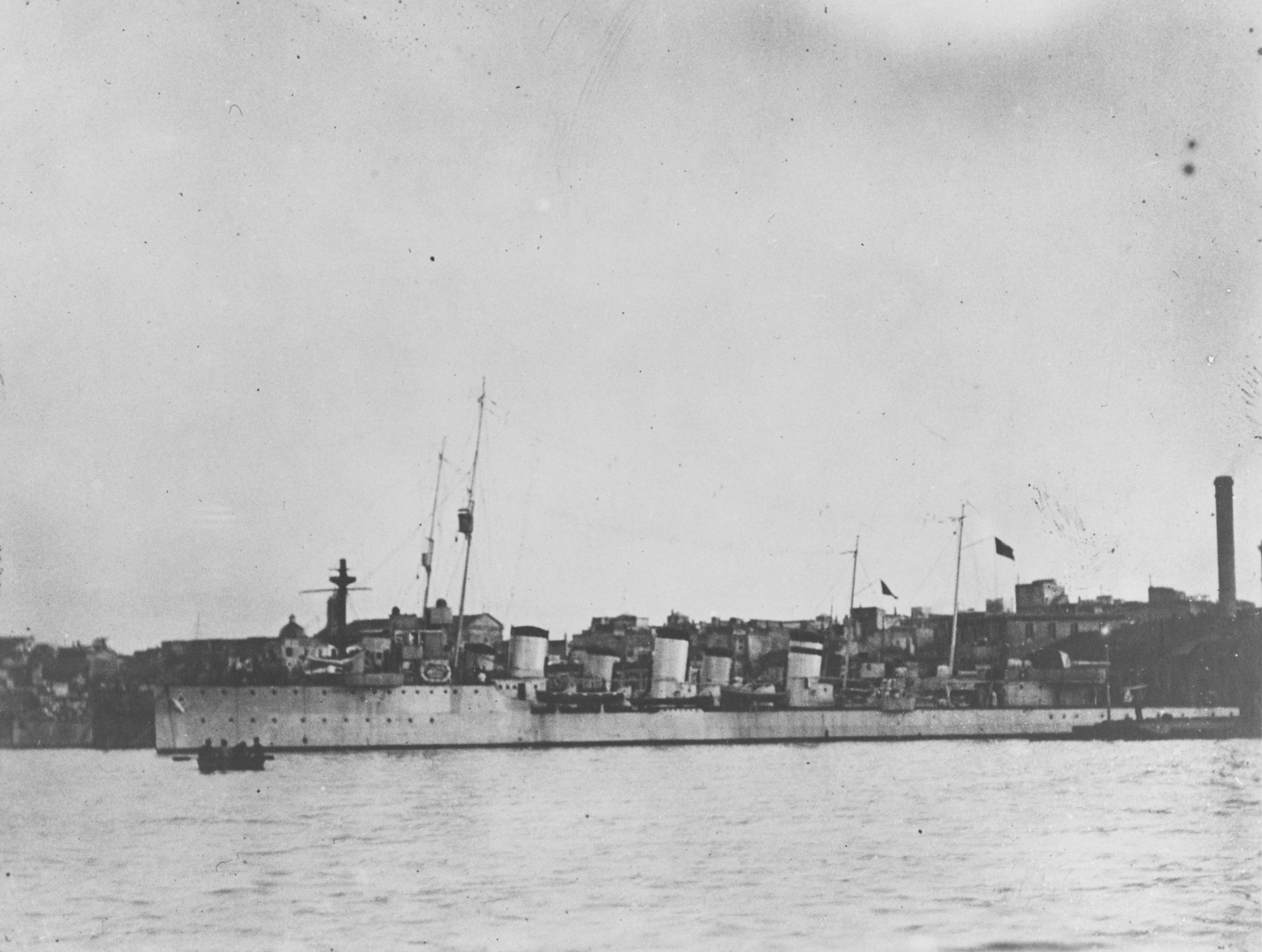
Nibbio in port, 1918; her sister Aquila is behind her

Ordered by the Royal Romanian Navy in 1913, the ship was laid down as Vârtej on 15 July 1914 by Cantieri Pattison (Pattison Shipyard) at its shipyard in Naples, Italy. World War I broke out in late July 1914, and Italy entered the war on the side of the Allies on 23 May 1915. Vârtej was 20 percent complete when Italy requisitioned her on 5 June 1915 for service in the Regia Marina. Renamed Nibbio, she was launched on 30 January 1918 and completed on 15 May 1918.

== Service history ==
=== Italy ===
Commissioned on 15 May 1918, Nibbio entered service in time to take part in the final months of World War I. She operated mainly in the Adriatic Sea, participating in the final stages of the Adriatic campaign against Austria-Hungary and the German Empire, taking part primarily in small naval actions involving clashes between torpedo boats and support operations for Allied motor torpedo boat and air attacks on Central Powers forces.

On 5 September 1918, Nibbio and her sister ships Aquila and Sparviero put to sea to provide support to the coastal torpedo boats 8 PN and 12 PN. Sources disagree on the purpose of the operation: According to one, the three scout cruisers were tasked to operate about 15 nautical miles (28 km; 17 mi) west of Menders Point while the torpedo boats attacked Austro-Hungarian merchant ships about 15 nautical miles (28 km; 17 mi) to the east at Durrës (known to the Italians as Durazzo) on the coast of the Principality of Albania, while another claims that they were covering the recovery of a broken-down flying boat that had landed in the Gulf of Drin. In either case, they were to intervene if Austro-Hungarian Navy warships attempted to intercept the torpedo boats. At 12:35, 8 PN spotted three Austro-Hungarian torpedo boats sweeping mines off Ulcinj (known to the Italians as Dulcigno), Albania. The three scout cruisers steered to attack the three Austro-Hungarian ships and opened fire on them, damaging the torpedo boat 86 F and prompting the Austro-Hungarians to retreat toward the coast and take shelter under cover of the Austro-Hungarian coastal artillery at Shëngjin (known to the Italians as San Giovanni de Medua).

On 2 October 1918, while other British and Italian ships bombarded Austro-Hungarian positions at Durrës, Nibbio, Aquila, and Sparviero were among numerous ships which operated off Durrës in support of the bombardment, tasked with countering any attempt by Austro-Hungarian Navy ships based at Cattaro to interfere with the bombardment. On 21 October 1918, the three scout cruisers covered a force bombarding Shëngjin.

By late October 1918, Austria-Hungary had effectively disintegrated, and the Armistice of Villa Giusti, signed on 3 November 1918, went into effect on 4 November 1918 and brought hostilities between Austria-Hungary and the Allies to an end. On 4 November, Nibbio, under the command of Capitano di fregata (Frigate Captain) Grixoni, left Vlorë (known to the Italians as Valona), Albania, with units of the Navy Battalion "Grado" (a naval infantry battalion) on board. At 14:00 that day she arrived at the island of Korčula (known to the Italians as Curzola) in the Adriatic Sea and took possession of it on behalf of the Kingdom of Italy, an action the local Slavic community strongly opposed. On 5 November 1918, Nibbio provided distant support to the Italian occupation of Šibenik (known to the Italians as Sebenico), an operation carried out by the torpedo boats Albatros and Pallade and two MAS motor torpedo boats. World War I ended six days later with the armistice between the Allies and the German Empire on 11 November 1918.

=== Kingdom of Romania ===
Romania purchased Nibbio and Sparviero in 1920. Nibbio became Mărășești and Sparviero was renamed Mărăști when they were commissioned upon arriving in Romania on 1 July 1920. The ships were formally re-classified as destroyers and assigned to the newly formed Counter-torpedo Division (Diviziunea Contratorpiloarelor) which was renamed as the Destroyer Squadron (Escadrila de Distrugătoare) on 1 April 1927. The sisters were sent to Italy in 1925–1926 for a refit where they had their 152 mm guns replaced by two twin-gun 120 mm Schneider-Canet-Armstrong 1918/19 turrets, one each fore and aft of the superstructure, and a fifth gun on a platform amidships. The aft 76 mm guns were removed during this time. Fire-control systems were fitted the following year. The Squadron was visited by King Carol II of Romania and the Prime Minister, Nicolae Iorga, on 27 May 1931. By 1940, the midships 120 mm gun had been replaced by a pair of twin-gun French Hotchkiss 13.2 mm (0.5 in) anti-aircraft machinegun mounts and the remaining 76 mm guns by a pair of German 3.7 cm (1.5 in) SK C/30 AA guns. Depth charge racks had been fitted on the stern and an Italian depth charge thrower was added. The ships could carry 40 depth charges or 50 mines. These changes reduced the displacement of the sisters to 1,410 long tons (1,430 t) at standard load and 1,723 long tons (1,751 t) at deep load.

==== World War II ====
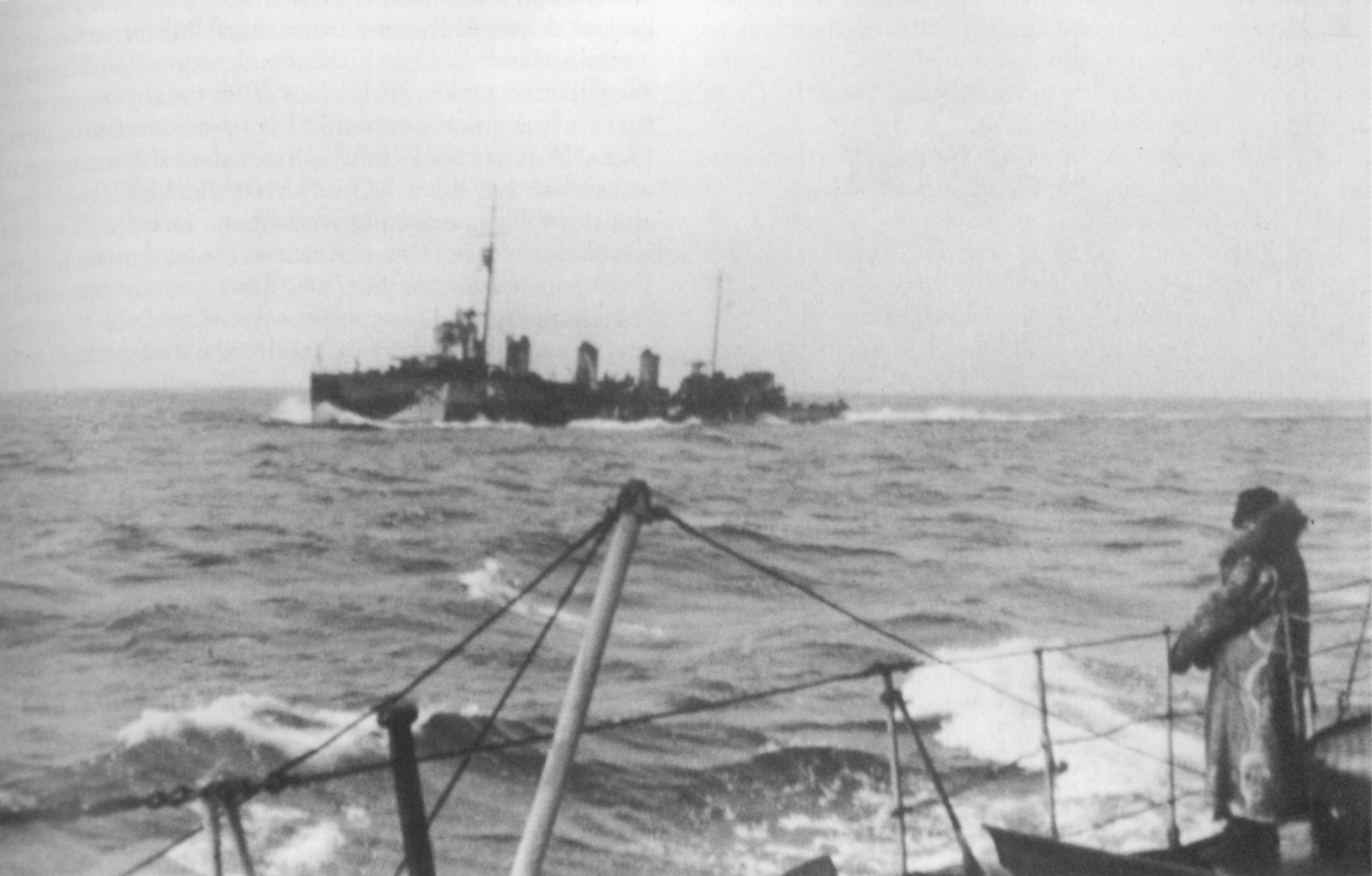
Mărășești at sea, 1942

Massively outnumbered by the Soviet Union's Black Sea Fleet, the Romanian ships were kept behind the minefields defending Constanța for several months after the start of the war. They spent that time training for convoy escort operations. Beginning on 5 October, the Romanians began laying minefields to defend the route between the Bosphorus and Constanța; the minelayers were protected by the destroyers. After the evacuation of Odessa on 16 October, the navy began to clear the Soviet mines defending the port and to lay their own minefields protecting the route between Constanța and Odessa. Mărășești was twice attacked off Mangalia, Romania, on 6 November 1941 by the Soviet submarine S-33, but was missed with all four torpedoes. Sometime during 1941–1942, the ship's turbines were damaged and limited her to a speed of 22 knots (41 km/h; 25 mph). On 20 April 1942, after the ice had melted, Mărășești, Mărăști and the destroyer Regina Maria escorted the first convoy to Ochakov, although the Romanian destroyers were generally used to escort ships between the Bosporus and Constanța. On the nights of 22/23 and 24/25 June, Mărășești, Regina Maria and her sister Regele Ferdinand covered the laying of defensive minefields off Odessa. After Sevastopol surrendered on 4 July to the Axis, a direct route between the port and Constanța was opened in October and operated year-round.

Mărășești and Mărăști and two gunboats were escorting a convoy of three cargo ships on 7 July 1943 when they were attacked by a small wolfpack of three submarines. Shch-201 fired six torpedoes at one of the gunboats and a freighter and missed with all of them. Mărășești depth charged one of the submarines and claimed to have sunk it, but no submarines were lost by the Soviets that day. (Note: This submarine has been identified as M-31, but no losses are listed for the month by naval historians Jürgen Rohwer, Mikhail Monakov, Norman Polmar and Jurrien Noot. The latter pair attribute the loss of M-31 to German aircraft on 2 October, while the former list it as of 17 December 1942 to a German patrol boat.) On the night of 9/10 November, the sisters escorted minelayers as they laid a minefield off Sevastopol. The minefield was enlarged between 14 and 16 November as Regele Ferdinand and Mărășești covered the minelayers. The submarine D-4 sank the German 4,627-gross register ton (GRT) freighter Santa Fé off Yevpatoria despite an escort of Mărășești and three smaller ships on 23 November.

At some point during the war, the ship's anti-aircraft armament was augmented with two additional 3.7 cm SK C/30 and four 2 cm (0.79 in) AA guns.

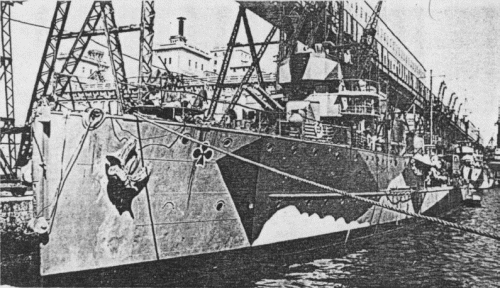
Mărășești in 1944

Successful Soviet attacks in early 1944 cut the overland connection of the Crimea with the rest of Ukraine and necessitated its supply by sea. In early April another offensive occupied most of the peninsula and encircled Sevastopol. The Romanians began evacuating the city on 14 April, with their destroyers covering the troop convoys. Adolf Hitler suspended the evacuation on 27 April, but relented on 8 May after further Soviet attacks further endangered the Axis forces in Sevastopol as they closed within artillery range of the harbour. Mărășești made one trip to evacuate Axis troops and was part of the last convoy to reach Sevastopol on the night of 11/12 May. Mărășești and Regina Maria covered the minelayers Amiral Murgescu and Dacia as they sealed off the gap that led to Sevastpol in the minefields defending Sulina on the night of 25/26 May. Mărășești was slightly damaged during a Soviet airstrike on Constanța on 20 August.

After King Michael's Coup on 23 August, Romania declared war on the Axis powers. Mărășești remained in harbour until she was seized by the Soviets on 5 September together with the rest of the Royal Romanian Navy.

=== Soviet Union ===
The ship was commissioned into the Soviet Navy as part of the Black Sea Fleet along with her sister ship NMS Mărăști on 14 September 1944 and was renamed Lyogkiy (Лёгкий) on 20 October 1944. The Soviet Union returned both ships to what by then was the People's Republic of Romania on 12 October 1945.

=== People's Republic of Romania ===
In Romanian service, the ships resumed their former names. The sisters were then assigned to the Destroyer Squadron before beginning an overhaul. When the Destroyer Division was redesignated as the 418th Destroyer Division in 1952, Mărășești was renamed D11. The ship continued to serve until April 1961, when she was discarded and subsequently scrapped.

== Bibliography ==
- Axworthy, Mark (1995). Third Axis, Fourth Ally: Romanian Armed Forces in the European War, 1941–1945. London: Arms and Armour Press. ISBN 978-1-85409-267-0.
- Berezhnoy, Sergey (1994). Трофеи и репарации ВМФ СССР [Trophies and Reparations of the Soviet Navy] (in Russian). Yakutsk: Sakhapoligrafizdat. OCLC 33334505.
- Budzbon, Przemysław; Radziemski, Jan & Twardowski, Marek (2022). Warships of the Soviet Fleets 1939–1945. Vol. I: Major Combatants. Annapolis, Maryland: Naval Institute Press. ISBN 978-1-68247-877-6.
- Cernuschi, Enrico & O'Hara, Vincent (2016). "The Naval War in the Adriatic, Part 2: 1917–1918". In Jordan, John (ed.). Warship 2016. London: Conway. pp. 62–75. ISBN 978-1-84486-326-6.
- Favre, Franco. La Marina nella Grande Guerra. Le operazioni navali, aeree, subacquee e terrestri in Adriatico (in Italian).
- Fraccaroli, Aldo (1985). "Italy". In Gray, Randal (ed.). Conway's All the World's Fighting Ships 1906–1921. Annapolis, Maryland: Naval Institute Press. pp. 252–290. ISBN 978-0-85177-245-5.
- Hervieux, Pierre (2001). "The Romanian Navy at War, 1941–1945". In Preston, Antony (ed.). Warship 2001–2002. London: Conway Maritime Press. pp. 70–88. ISBN 978-0-85177-901-0.
- Polmar, Norman & Noot, Jurrien (1991). Submarines of the Russian and Soviet Navies, 1718–1990. Annapolis, Maryland: Naval Institute Press. ISBN 978-0-87021-570-4.
- Rohwer, Jürgen (2005). Chronology of the War at Sea 1939–1945: The Naval History of World War Two (Third Revised ed.). Annapolis, Maryland: Naval Institute Press. ISBN 978-1-59114-119-8.
- Rohwer, Jürgen & Monakov, Mikhail S. (2001). Stalin's Ocean-Going Fleet: Soviet Naval Strategy and Shipbuilding Programs 1935–1953. London: Frank Cass. ISBN 0-7146-4895-7.
- Rotaru, Jipa & Damaschin, Ioan (2000). Glorie și dramă: Marina Regală Română, 1940–1945 (in Romanian). Editura "Ion Cristoiu". ISBN 978-973-995447-1.
- Twardowski, Marek (1985). "Rumania". In Gray, Randal (ed.). Conway's All the World's Fighting Ships 1906–1921. Annapolis, Maryland: Naval Institute Press. pp. 421–422. ISBN 978-0-85177-245-5.
- Whitley, M. J. (2000). Destroyers of World War Two: An International Encyclopedia. London: Cassell & Co. ISBN 1-85409-521-8.
