= NMS Regele Ferdinand =

Romanian Navy's Regele Ferdinand-class destroyer

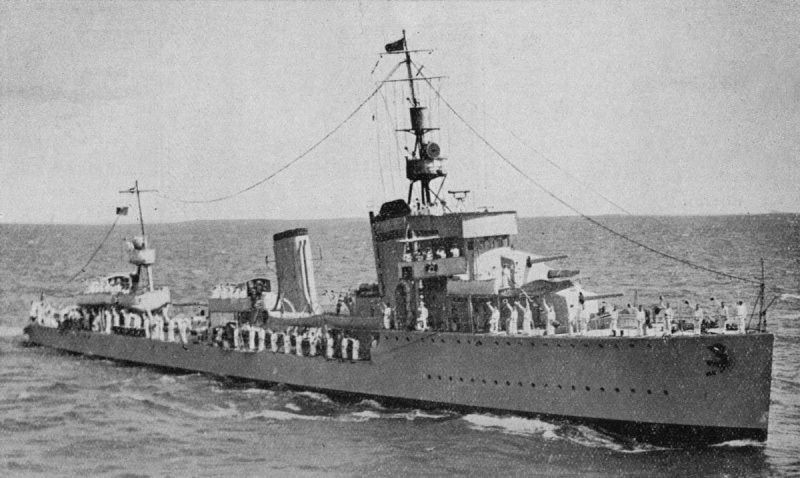
- Regele Ferdinand at sea

History

Romania
- Name: Regele Ferdinand
- Namesake: King Ferdinand I of Romania
- Ordered: 13 November 1926
- Builder: Pattison Yard, Naples, Italy
- Laid down: June 1927
- Launched: 2 December 1928
- Commissioned: 7 September 1930
- Fate: Seized by the Soviet Union, 5 September 1944

Soviet Union
- Name: Likhoy
- Acquired: 5 September 1944
- Commissioned: 20 October 1944
- Stricken: 3 July 1951
- Fate: Returned to Romania, 24 June 1951

People's Republic of Romania
- Acquired: 24 June 1951
- Renamed: D21, 1952
- Stricken: April 1961
- Fate: Scrapped, after April 1961

General characteristics (as built)
- Class & type: Regele Ferdinand-class destroyer
- Displacement: 1,400 long tons (1,422 t) (standard); 1,850 long tons (1,880 t) (full load)
- Length: 101.9 m (334 ft 4 in) (o/a)
- Beam: 9.6 m (31 ft 6 in)
- Draught: 3.51 m (11 ft 6 in)
- Installed power: 4 Thornycroft boilers; 52,000 shp (39,000 kW)
- Propulsion: 2 shafts; 2 geared steam turbines
- Speed: 37 knots (69 km/h; 43 mph)
- Range: 3,000 nmi (5,600 km; 3,500 mi) at 15 knots (28 km/h; 17 mph)
- Complement: 212
- Armament: 5 × single 120 mm (4.7 in) guns; 1 × single 76 mm (3 in) AA gun; 2 × single 40 mm (1.6 in) AA guns; 2 × triple 533 mm (21 in) torpedo tubes; 40 depth charges; 50 mines

NMS Regele Ferdinand was the lead ship of her class of two destroyers built in Italy for the Romanian Navy in the late 1920s. After the Axis invasion of the Soviet Union on 22 June 1941 (Operation Barbarossa), she was limited to escort duties in the western half of the Black Sea during the war by the powerful Soviet Black Sea Fleet which heavily outnumbered Axis naval forces in the Black Sea. The ship may have sunk two Soviet submarines during the war. In early 1944 the Soviets were able to cut off and surround the port of Sevastopol on the Crimean Peninsula. Regele Ferdinand covered convoys evacuating Axis troops from Sevastopol and was badly damaged in May when she rescued some troops herself.

Later that year Romania switched sides, but despite that the Soviets seized the Romanian ships and incorporated them into the Soviet Navy. Renamed Likhoy, the ship served until she was struck from the navy list in 1951 when she was returned to the Romanians who renamed her D21 in 1952. The ship was discarded in 1961 and subsequently scrapped.

== Background and design ==
Following the end of World War I and the re-purchase of two Aquila-class cruisers from Italy, the Romanian Government decided to order also two modern destroyers from the Pattison Yard in Italy, as part of the 1927 Naval Programme. The design was based on the British Shakespeare-class destroyer leaders, but differed in the arrangement of their propulsion machinery. The guns were imported from Sweden and the fire-control system from Germany. Four destroyers were intended to be ordered, but only two were actually built.

The Regele Ferdinand-class ships had an overall length of 101.9 metres (334 ft 4 in), a beam of 9.6 metres (31 ft 6 in), and a mean draught of 3.51 metres (11 ft 6 in). They displaced 1,400 long tons (1,422 t) at standard load and 1,850 long tons (1,880 t) at deep load. Their crew numbered 212 officers and sailors. The ships were powered by two Parsons geared steam turbines, each driving a single propeller, using steam provided by four Thornycroft boilers. The turbines were designed to produce 52,000 shaft horsepower (39,000 kW) for a speed of 37 knots (69 km/h; 43 mph), (Note: Twardowski says 48,000 shp (36,000 kW) and a speed of 35 knots (65 km/h; 40 mph).) although the Regele Ferdinands reached 38 knots (70 km/h; 44 mph) during their sea trials. They could carry 480 long tons (490 t) of fuel oil which gave them a range of 3,000 nautical miles (5,600 km; 3,500 mi) at a speed of 15 knots (28 km/h; 17 mph).

The main armament of the Regele Ferdinand-class ships consisted of five 50-calibre Bofors 120-millimetre (4.7 in) guns in single mounts, two superfiring pairs fore and aft of the superstructure and one gun aft of the rear funnel. For anti-aircraft defense, they were equipped with one Bofors 76-millimetre (3 in) anti-aircraft (AA) gun between the funnels and a pair of 40-millimetre (1.6 in) AA guns. The ships were fitted with two triple mounts for 533-millimetre (21 in) torpedo tubes and could carry 50 mines and 40 depth charges. They were equipped with a Siemens fire-control system which included a pair of rangefinders, one each for the fore and aft guns.

=== Modifications ===
The 40-millimetre guns were replaced by two German 3.7-centimetre (1.5 in) AA guns and a pair of French 13.2-millimetre (0.52 in) M1929 Hotchkiss machineguns were added in 1939. Two Italian depth charge throwers were later installed. During World War II, the 76-millimetre gun was replaced by four 20-millimetre (0.79 in) AA guns. In 1943, the two ships were equipped with a German S-Gerät sonar. The following year, the upper forward 120-millimetre gun was replaced by a German 88-millimetre (3.5 in) AA gun. German 88-millimetre guns in Romanian service were themselves modified by being fitted with Romanian-produced barrel liners.

== Construction and career ==
Regele Ferdinand, named after King Ferdinand I of Romania, was ordered on 13 November 1926 and was laid down by Pattison in June 1927 at their shipyard in Naples, Italy. She was launched on 2 December 1928 and commissioned on 7 September 1930 after arriving in Romania. The ship was assigned to the Destroyer Squadron, which was visited by King Carol II of Romania and the Prime Minister, Nicolae Iorga, on 27 May 1931.

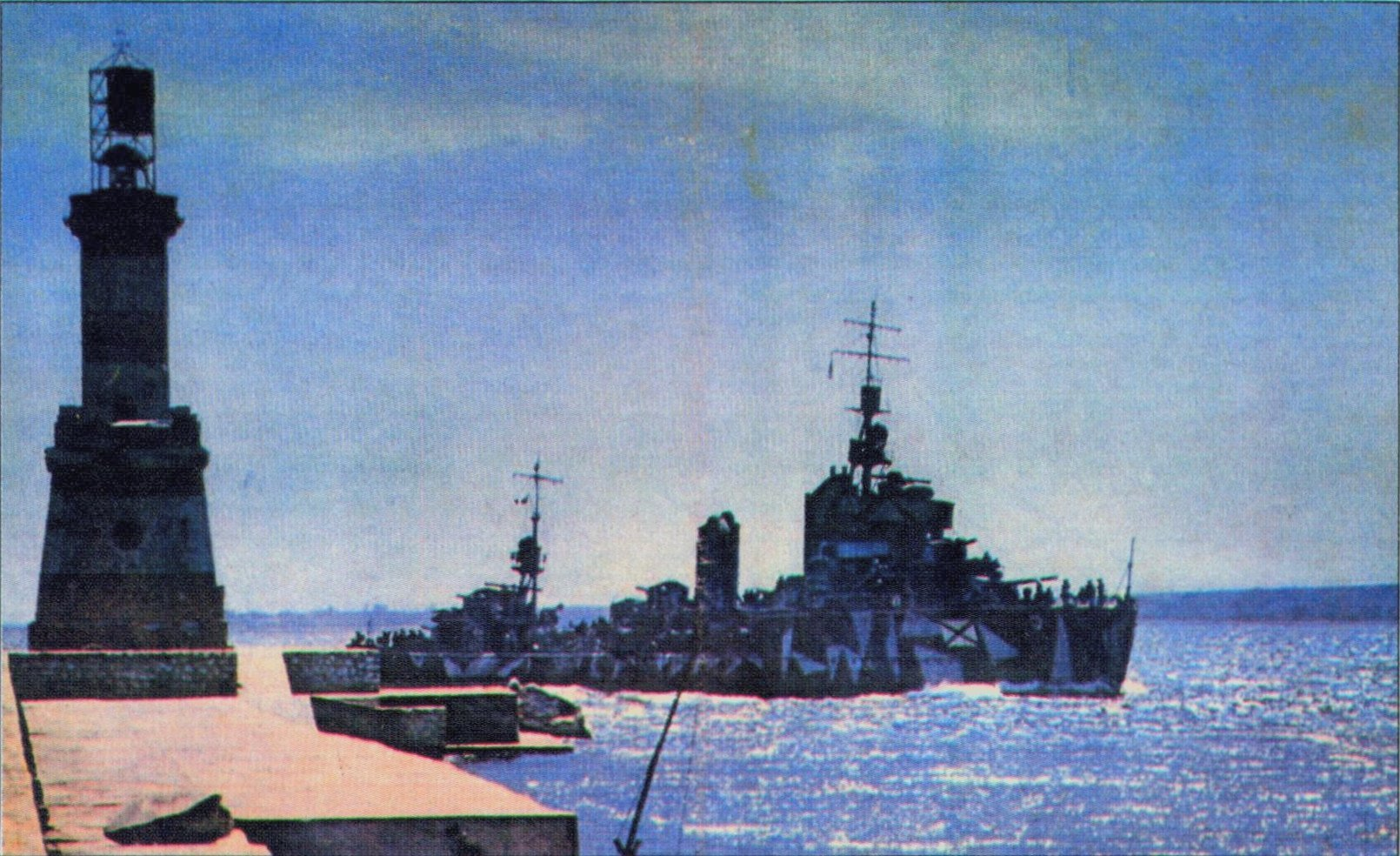
Wartime photo of Regele Ferdinand in splinter camouflage

Massively outnumbered by the Black Sea Fleet, the Romanian ships were kept behind the minefields defending Constanța for several months after the start of Operation Barbarossa on 22 June 1941, training for convoy escort operations. Beginning on 5 October, the Romanians began laying minefields to defend the route between the Bosphorus and Constanța; the minelayers were protected by the destroyers. After the evacuation of Odessa on 16 October, they began to clear the Soviet mines defending the port and to lay their own minefields protecting the route between Constanța and Odessa. On 1 December Regele Ferdinand, her sister ship Regina Maria and the flotilla leader Mărăști were escorting a convoy to Odessa when a submarine (Note: Variously identified as D-4 or M-58.) unsuccessfully attacked the convoy. It was quickly spotted and depth charged by Regele Ferdinand and Regina Maria with the latter claiming a kill. Soviet records do not acknowledge any losses on that date. The sisters escorted another convoy to Odessa on 16–17 December, the last one before ice closed the port. As the convoy passed Jibrieni, Regele Ferdinand spotted a submarine's periscope and depth charged the submarine after evading a pair of torpedoes. The ship reported spotting debris and an oil slick; she may have sunk M-59. (Note: Sources disagree about the date of this submarine's loss. Polmar & Noot say 17 December, but Rohwer & Monakov attribute her loss to a mine between 28 October and 1 November.)

During the winter of 1941–1942, the Romanian destroyers were primarily occupied with escorting convoys between the Bosporus and Constanța. On the nights of 22/23 and 24/25 June, Regele Ferdinand, Regina Maria and the flotilla leader Mărășești covered the laying of defensive minefields off Odessa. After Sevastopol surrendered on 4 July, a direct route between the port and Constanța was opened in October and operated year-round. On 14 October Regele Ferdinand was attacked and missed by the submarine M-32. The submarine Shch-207 unsuccessfully attacked Regele Ferdinand and Mărăști as they escorted a convoy of two Italian oil tankers off the Bosporus; they depth charged the submarine, but she survived. On 14 November the German 2,793-gross register ton (GRT) oil tanker SS Ossag was torpedoed at the entrance to the Bosporus by the submarine L-23 as she was being met by the sisters.

Regele Ferdinand and Mărășești escorted the minelayer Amiral Murgescu as she laid a minefield off the approaches to Sevastopol harbor on the night of 13/14 September 1943. Two days later Regele Ferdinand attacked a submarine, possibly Shch-207, and claimed to have sunk it. Soviet sources do not acknowledge any submarine lost on that day. The submarine S-33 made an unsuccessful attack off Yevpatoria on a ship escorted by Regele Ferdinand on the early morning of 22 September. On the night of 9/10 November, the sisters escorted minelayers as they laid a minefield off Sevastopol. The minefield was enlarged between 14 and 16 November as Regele Ferdinand and Mărășești covered the minelayers.

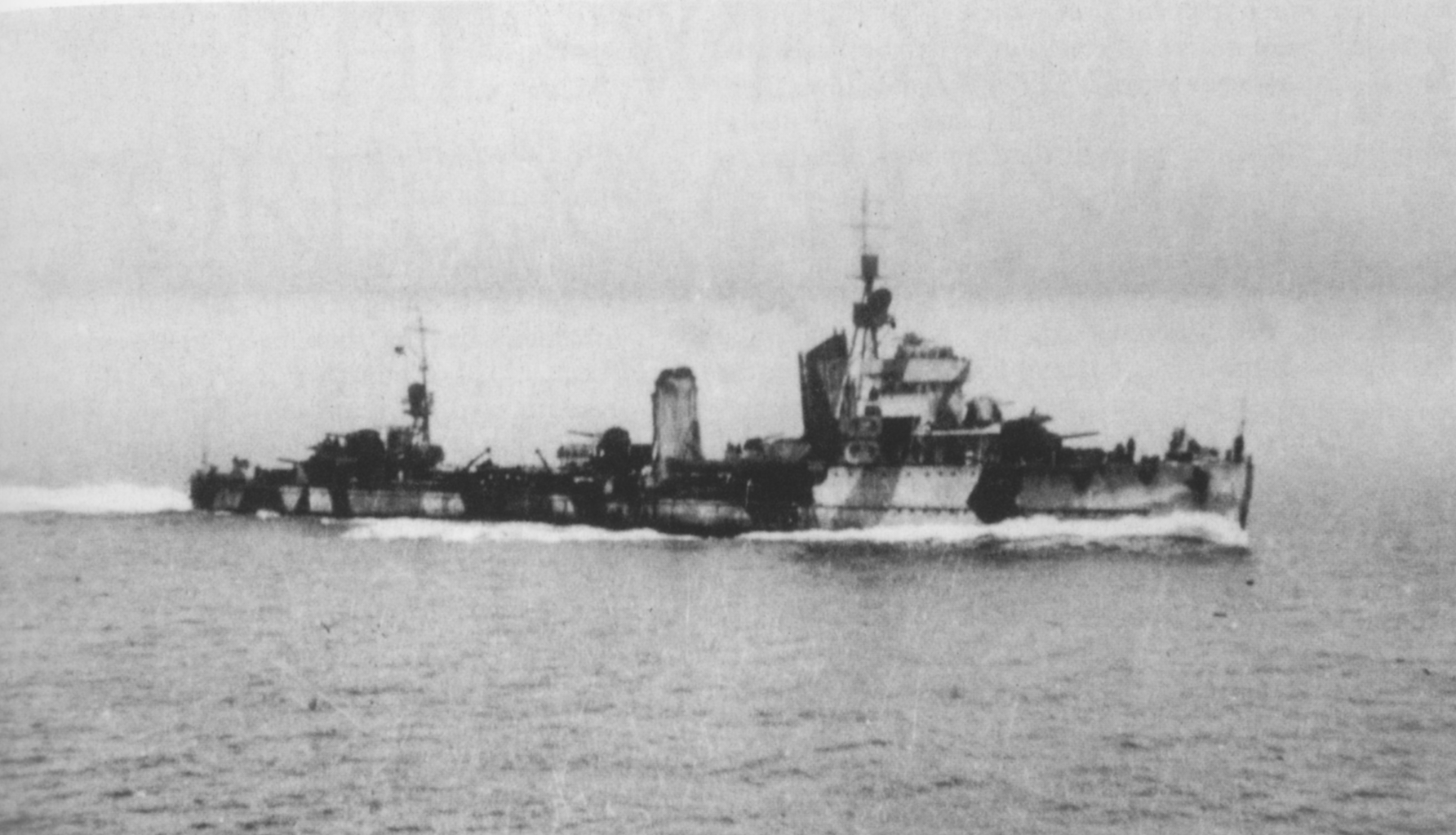
Regele Ferdinand en route to Sevastopol, 1944

Successful Soviet attacks in early 1944 cut the overland connection of the Crimea with the rest of Ukraine and necessitated its supply by sea. In early April another offensive occupied most of the peninsula and encircled Sevastopol. The Romanians began evacuating the city on 14 April, with their destroyers covering the troop convoys. Four days later, the 5,700 GRT cargo ship SS Alba Julia was unsuccessfully attacked by the submarines L-6 and L-4. Shortly after the latter submarine missed with her pair of torpedoes, the freighter was bombed and set on fire by Soviet aircraft. Other ships rescued her passengers and crew after they abandoned ship, but the sisters were dispatched to see if she could be salvaged. They put a skeleton crew aboard to operate her pumps and to stabilise her before a pair of tugboats arrived the next morning to tow her to Constanța.

Adolf Hitler suspended the evacuation on 27 April, but relented on 8 May after further Soviet attacks further endangered the Axis forces in Sevastopol as they closed within artillery range of the harbour. Regele Ferdinand arrived at Sevastopol harbour during the early morning of 11 May and loaded troops before departing later that morning. Soviet air attacks began at 06:00 and lasted until 10:30. The exposed troops and her AA gunners suffered the most from strafing of her decks by aircraft and bomb splinters, but one bomb struck the bridge and killed two officers. Other hits started small fires, but the biggest problem was an unexploded bomb that pierced the port oil tank, causing a major leak. At 09:30 she was engaged by Soviet coastal artillery, but suppressed them with her counter fire. About an hour later, her captain radioed for help, shortly before the final attacks destroyed her radio room and damaged her starboard fuel lines; despite passing oil hand-to-hand in a bucket brigade, the ship ran out of fuel early the following morning and had to be towed a short distance to Constanța. On 12 May at 07:00, Regele Ferdinand was the first ship visited by Marshal Ion Antonescu after the evacuation from Sevastopol, she was inclined towards the port side and had numerous shrapnel holes on her superstructure. Regele Ferdinand was damaged during a Soviet airstrike on Constanța on 20 August with 47 men killed.

After King Michael's Coup on 23 August, Romania declared war on the Axis powers. Regele Ferdinand remained in harbour until she was seized by the Soviets on 5 September together with the rest of the Romanian Navy. Before being renamed Likhoy on 20 October, the ship was commissioned into the Soviet Navy on 14 September as part of the Black Sea Fleet, along with her sister. She was struck from the navy list on 3 July 1951 after she had been returned to Romania with her sister on 24 June. The sisters rejoined Mărăști and Mărășești when they were assigned to the Destroyer Squadron upon their return. Regele Ferdinand was renamed D21 when the Romanian destroyers were assigned numbers when the Destroyer Division was redesignated as the 418th Destroyer Division in 1952. The ship continued to serve until April 1961, when she was discarded and subsequently scrapped.

== Bibliography ==
- Axworthy, Mark (1995). Third Axis, Fourth Ally: Romanian Armed Forces in the European War, 1941–1945. London: Arms and Armour Press. ISBN 1-85409-267-7.
- Berezhnoy, Sergey (1994). Трофеи и репарации ВМФ СССР [Trophies and Reparations of the Soviet Navy] (in Russian). Yakutsk: Sakhapoligrafizdat. OCLC 33334505.
- Budzbon, Przemysław; Radziemski, Jan & Twardowski, Marek (2022). Warships of the Soviet Fleets 1939–1945. Vol. I: Major Combatants. Annapolis, Maryland: Naval Institute Press. ISBN 978-1-68247-877-6.
- Hervieux, Pierre (2001). "The Romanian Navy at War, 1941–1945". In Preston, Antony (ed.). Warship 2001–2002. London: Conway Maritime Press. pp. 70–88. ISBN 0-85177-901-8.
- Polmar, Norman & Noot, Jurrien (1991). Submarines of the Russian and Soviet Navies, 1718–1990. Annapolis, Maryland: Naval Institute Press. ISBN 0-87021-570-1.
- Rohwer, Jürgen (2005). Chronology of the War at Sea 1939–1945: The Naval History of World War Two (Third Revised ed.). Annapolis, Maryland: Naval Institute Press. ISBN 1-59114-119-2.
- Rohwer, Jürgen & Monakov, Mikhail S. (2001). Stalin's Ocean-Going Fleet: Soviet Naval Strategy and Shipbuilding Programs 1935–1953. London: Frank Cass. ISBN 0-7146-4895-7.
- Twardowski, Marek (1980). "Romania". In Chesneau, Roger (ed.). Conway's All the World's Fighting Ships 1922–1946. Greenwich, UK: Conway Maritime Press. pp. 359–362. ISBN 0-85177-146-7.
- Whitley, M. J. (2000). Destroyers of World War Two: An International Encyclopedia. London: Cassell & Co. ISBN 1-85409-521-8.
- Moșneagu, Marian (2005), Regele și regina Mării Negre, Muntenia, ISBN 973-692-108-5
- Damaschin, Ion; Rotaru, Jipa (2022). Glorie și dramă [Glory and drama - The Romanian Royal Navy (1940-1945)] (in Romanian) (2nd ed.). EEC (Editura Evenimentul și Capital). p. 242. ISBN 978-606-95444-64.
