= NMS Mărăști =

Romanian Navy's Vifor-class destroyer

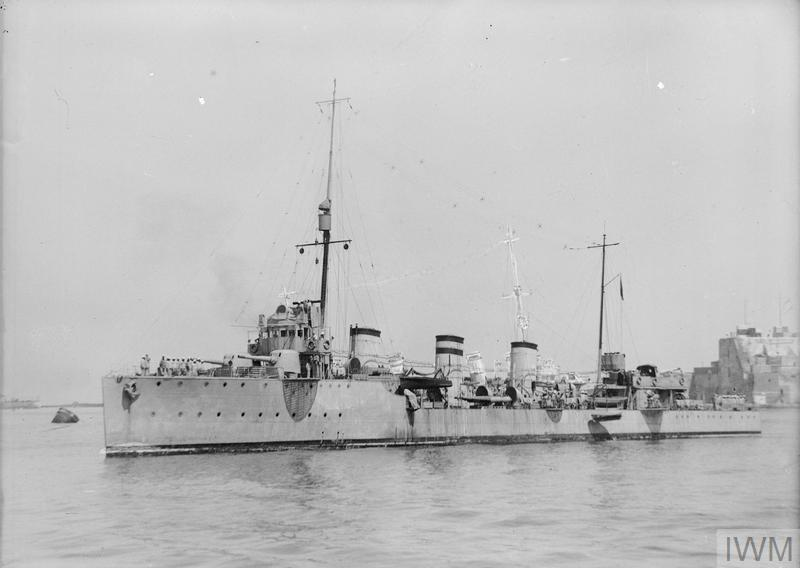
- Italian scout cruiser Sparviero, 1917–1920; later Mărăști

History

Kingdom of Romania
- Name: Vijelie
- Namesake: Squall
- Operator: Royal Romanian Navy (planned)
- Ordered: 1913
- Builder: Cantiere Pattison, Naples, Kingdom of Italy
- Laid down: 29 January 1914
- Fate: Requisitioned by Kingdom of Italy 5 June 1915

History

Kingdom of Italy
- Name: Sparviero
- Namesake: Sparrowhawk
- Acquired: 5 June 1915
- Launched: 26 March 1917
- Commissioned: 15 July 1917
- Fate: Transferred to Romania 1 July 1920

Kingdom of Romania
- Name: Mărăști
- Namesake: Battle of Mărăști
- Acquired: 1 July 1920
- Commissioned: 1 July 1920
- Fate: Seized by the Soviet Union 5 September 1944

Soviet Union
- Name: Mărășești
- Namesake: Previous name retained
- Acquired: 5 September 1944
- Commissioned: 14 September 1944
- Renamed: Lovkiy 20 October 1944
- Namesake: Dexterous
- Stricken: 12 October 1945
- Fate: Returned to Romania 12 October 1945

People's Republic of Romania
- Name: Mărăști
- Namesake: Battle of Mărăști (previous name restored)
- Acquired: 12 October 1945
- Renamed: D12, 1952
- Fate: Discarded April 1961; Scrapped

General characteristics (as built)
- Class & type: Vifor-class destroyer
- Displacement: 1,594 long tons (1,620 t) (normal); 1,760 long tons (1,790 t) (full load)
- Length: 94.7 m (310 ft 8 in) (o/a)
- Beam: 9.5 m (31 ft 2 in)
- Draft: 3.6 m (11 ft 10 in)
- Installed power: 4 Thornycroft boilers; 40,000 shp (30,000 kW)
- Propulsion: 2 shafts; 2 geared steam turbines
- Speed: 34 knots (63 km/h; 39 mph)
- Range: 3,000 nmi (5,600 km; 3,500 mi) at 15 knots (28 km/h; 17 mph)
- Complement: 146
- Armament: 3 × single 152 mm (6.0 in) guns; 4 × single 76 mm (3.0 in) AA guns; 2 × twin 457 mm (17.7 in) torpedo tubes; 44 mines

NMS Mărăști was one of four Vifor-class destroyers ordered from Italy by Romania shortly before the beginning of the World War I. All four sister ships were requisitioned when Italy joined the war in 1915. Originally named Vijelie by the Romanians, she was renamed Sparviero in Italian service. Not completed until mid-1917, the ship took part in the later stages of the Adriatic campaign but engaged Austro-Hungarian Navy ships in the Adriatic Sea only twice before the war ended in November 1918. She was renamed Mărăști when the Romanians re-purchased her in 1920.

After the Axis invasion of the Soviet Union on 22 June 1941 (Operation Barbarossa) during World War II, Mărăști took part in combat during the Soviet Navy's the Raid on Constanța a few days later and may have damaged a Soviet destroyer leader during the battle. The powerful Soviet Black Sea Fleet heavily outnumbered Axis naval forces in the Black Sea and the Romanian destroyers were limited to escort duties in the western half of the Black Sea during the war. In early 1944 the Soviets were able to cut off and surround the port of Sevastopol on the Crimean Peninsula; during this time Mărăști escorted convoys evacuating Axis troops from the port before she ran aground in April 1944. Mărăști saw no further action as she was being repaired.

In August 1944 Romania switched sides and joined the Allies, but despite that the Soviets seized the Romanian ships and incorporated them into the Soviet Navy. Renamed Lovkiy, the ship only served for a year before the Soviets returned her to the Romanians. The Romanians once again named her Mărăști, but renamed her D12 in 1952. The ship was discarded in 1961 and subsequently scrapped.

== Design and description ==
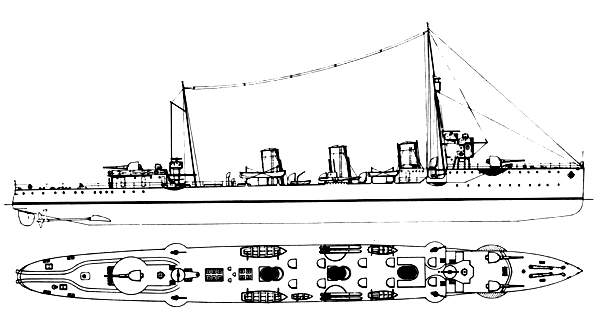
Plan and right elevation line drawing of the Aquila-class scout cruisers

The Vifor-class destroyers were ordered in 1913 by Romania from the Pattison Shipyard in Italy, as part of the 1912 Naval Program. They were to be armed with three 120 mm (4.7 in) guns, four 75 mm (3.0 in) guns, five 45 cm (17.7 in) torpedo tubes and have a 10-hour endurance at full speed. Three ships had been laid down by the time Italy joined the Allied side in World War I on 23 May 1915 by declaring war on the Austro-Hungarian Empire. The Italians requisitioned the Romanian ships on 5 June, redesignating them as Aquila-class scout cruisers (esploratori). By this time Vijelie approximately 50 percent complete and was renamed Sparviero.

The ships had an overall length of 94.7 meters (310 ft 8 in), had a beam of 9.5 meters (31 ft 2 in), and a draft of 3.6 meters (11 ft 10 in). They displaced 1,594 long tons (1,620 t) at normal load and 1,760 long tons (1,790 t) at deep load. Their crew numbered 9 officers and 137 sailors. The ships were powered by two Tosi steam turbines, each driving a single propeller, using steam provided by five Thornycroft boilers. The turbines were designed to produce 40,000 shaft horsepower (30,000 kW) for a speed of 34 knots (63 km/h; 39 mph), although Sparviero reached 38 knots (70 km/h; 44 mph) during her sea trials from 48,020 shp (35,810 kW). The scouts carried enough fuel oil to give them a range of 1,700 nautical miles (3,100 km; 2,000 mi) at a speed of 15 knots (28 km/h; 17 mph).

The Italians initially intended to arm the ships with seven 120 mm guns and two pairs of twin mounts for 45 cm torpedo tubes, but they changed the gun armament to three 152 mm (6.0 in) and four 76 mm weapons to outgun their nearest Austro-Hungarian equivalents, the Admiral Spaun and Novara-class scout cruisers. Two of the 152 mm guns were mounted side-by-side on the forecastle and the third gun was mounted on the aft superstructure. The 76 mm anti-aircraft (AA) guns were positioned two on each broadside. The torpedo mounts were abreast the middle funnel, one on each broadside. Sparviero could carry 44 mines.

== Construction ==
Ordered by the Royal Romanian Navy in 1913, the ship was laid down as Vijelie on 29 January 1914 by Cantieri Pattison (Pattison Shipyard) at its shipyard in Naples, Italy. World War I broke out in late July 1914, and Italy entered the war on the side of the Allies on 23 May 1915. Vijelie was 50 percent complete when Italy requisitioned her on 5 June 1915 for service in the Regia Marina. Renamed Sparviero, she was launched on 25 March 1917 and completed on 15 July 1917.

== Service history ==
=== Italy ===
==== 1917 ====
Sparviero was commissioned on 15 July 1917. During World War I, she operated in the Adriatic Sea, participating in the Adriatic campaign against Austria-Hungary and the German Empire, taking part primarily in small naval actions involving clashes between torpedo boats and support operations for Allied motor torpedo boat and air attacks on Central Powers forces.

On 29 September 1917, under the command of Capitano di navio (Captain) Ferdinando of Savoy, Prince of Udine, Sparviero put to sea with two formations of destroyers (one made up of Ardente, Ardito, and Audace, and the other of Francesco Stocco, Giovanni Acerbi, Giuseppe Cesare Abba, and Vincenzo Giordano Orsini) to support a bombing raid by 10 Italian airplanes against the Austro-Hungarian Navy base at Pola. They encountered an Austro-Hungarian force composed of the destroyers Huszár, Streiter, Turul, and Velebit and four torpedo boats on a similar mission against an Italian airbase. The Italians opened fire just before midnight at a range of 3,000 metres (3,300 yards), but received the worst of the initial exchange as the Austro-Hungarians concentrated their fire on the leading ship, Sparviero. Sparviero was hit five times, but only three men were wounded, and one Italian destroyer was hit. As the Austro-Hungarians retreated towards the shelter of their minefields, the Italians crippled Velebit and set her on fire. Another Austro-Hungarian destroyer took her in tow and both sides returned to port after an inconclusive exchange of fire inside the minefields later that night during the predawn hours of 30 September.

An Austro-Hungarian Navy force consisting of the scout cruiser Helgoland and the destroyers Balaton, Csepel, Lika, Orjen, Tátra, and Triglav left the Austro-Hungarian Navy base at Cattaro on 18 October 1917 to attack Italian convoys. The Austro-Hungarians found no convoys, so on 19 October Helgoland and Lika moved within sight of Brindisi, Italy, to entice Allied ships into chasing them and lure the Allies into an ambush by the Austro-Hungarian submarines U-32 and U-40. Sparviero gor underway from Brindisi with her sister ship Aquila, the destroyers Antonio Mosto, Giuseppe Missori, and Indomito, the British Royal Navy light cruisers HMS Gloucester and HMS Newcastle, and the French Navy destroyers Bisson, Commandant Bory, and Commandant Rivière to join other Italian ships in pursuit of the Austro-Hungarians, but after a long chase which also saw some Italian air attacks on the Austro-Hungarian ships, the Austro-Hungarians escaped and all the Italian ships returned to port without damage.

On 28 November 1917, an Austro-Hungarian Navy force consisting of Huszár, Streiter, Triglav, the destroyers Dikla, Dinara, and Reka, and the torpedo boats TB 78, TB 79, TB 86, and TB 90 attacked the Italian coast. While Dikla, Huszár, Streiter, and the torpedo boats unsuccessfully attacked first Porto Corsini and then Rimini, Dinara, Reka, and Triglav bombarded a railway near the mouth of the Metauro, damaging a train, the railway tracks, and telegraph lines. The Austro-Hungarian ships then reunited and headed back to the main Austro-Hungarian naval base at Pola. Sparviero, Aquila, Ardente, Ardito, Audace, Francesco Stocco, Giovanni Acerbi, Giuseppe Cesare Abba, Vincenzo Giordano Orsini, and the destroyer Giuseppe Sirtori departed Venice, Italy, and, together with reconnaissance seaplanes, pursued the Austro-Hungarian formation. The seaplanes attacked the Austro-Hungarians without success, and the Italian ships had to give up the chase when they did not sight the Austro-Hungarians until they neared Cape Promontore on the southern coast of Istria, as continuing beyond it would bring them too close to Pola.

Sparviero and her sister ship Aquila escorted a force of destroyers and smaller vessels as they bombarded Central Powers forces in Grisolera, Italy, on 19 December 1917.

==== 1918 ====
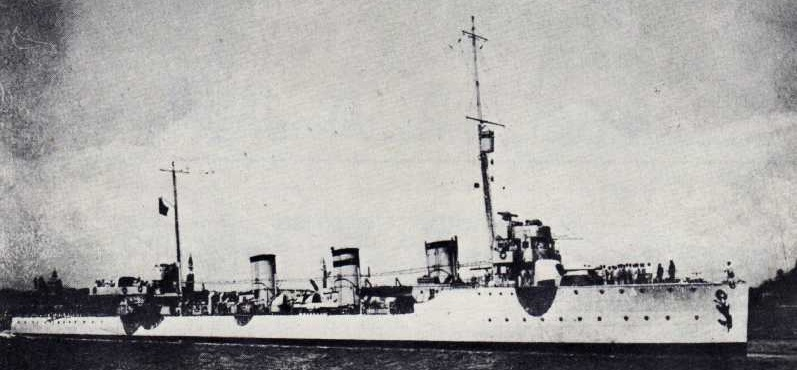
Profile view of Sparviero in 1918.

On 5 September 1918, Sparviero, Aquila, and their sister ship Nibbio put to sea to provide support to the coastal torpedo boats 8 PN and 12 PN. Sources disagree on the purpose of the operation: According to one, the three scout cruisers were tasked to operate about 15 nautical miles (28 km; 17 mi) west of Menders Point while the torpedo boats attacked Austro-Hungarian merchant ships about 15 nautical miles (28 km; 17 mi) to the east at Durrës (known to the Italians as Durazzo) on the coast of Albania, while another claims that they were covering the recovery of a broken-down flying boat that had landed in the Gulf of Drin. In either case, they were to intervene if Austro-Hungarian warships attempted to intercept the torpedo boats. At 12:35, 8 PN spotted three Austro-Hungarian torpedo boats sweeping mines off Ulcinj (known to the Italians as Dulcigno), Albania. The three scout cruisers steered to attack the three Austro-Hungarian ships and opened fire on them, damaging the torpedo boat 86 F and prompting the Austro-Hungarians to retreat toward the coast and take shelter under cover of the Austro-Hungarian coastal artillery at Shëngjin (known to the Italians as San Giovanni de Medua).

On 2 October 1918, while other British and Italian ships bombarded Austro-Hungarian positions at Durrës, Aquila, Nibbio, and Sparviero were among numerous ships which operated off Durrës in support of the bomdardment, tasked with countering any attempt by Austro-Hungarian Navy ships based at Cattaro to interfere with the bombardment. On 21 October 1918, the three scout cruisers covered a force bombarding Shëngjin.

By late October 1918, Austria-Hungary had effectively disintegrated, and the Armistice of Villa Giusti, signed on 3 November 1918, went into effect on 4 November 1918 and brought hostilities between Austria-Hungary and the Allies to an end. On 4 November, Sparviero, under the command of Prince Ferdinando, left Vlorë (known to the Italians as Valona), Albania, with units of the Navy Battalion "Grado" (a naval infantry battalion) on board, made a risky crossing of minefields off the coast of Dalmatia and proceeded to the island of Mljet (known to the Italians as Meleda) in the Adriatic Sea, which she took possession of on behalf of the Kingdom of Italy.

World War I ended with the armistice between the Allies and the German Empire on 11 November 1918. In the war's immediate aftermath, Sparviero and Aquila got underway from Brindisi and took possession of Hvar (known to the Italians as Lesina), an island off the coast of Dalmatia, on 15 November 1918.

=== Kingdom of Romania ===
Sparviero and Nibbio were re-purchased by Romania in 1920. Sparviero became Mărăști and Nibbio was renamed Mărășești when they were commissioned after arriving in Romania on 1 July 1920. The ships were formally re-classified as destroyers and assigned to the newly formed Counter-torpedo Division (Diviziunea Contratorpiloarelor) which was renamed as the Destroyer Squadron (Escadrila de Distrugătoare) on 1 April 1927. The sisters were sent to Italy in 1925–1926 for a refit where they had their 152 mm guns replaced by two twin-gun 120 mm Schneider-Canet-Armstrong 1918/19 turrets, one each fore and aft of the superstructure, and a fifth gun on a platform amidships. The aft 76 mm guns removed during this time. Fire-control systems were fitted the following year. The Squadron was visited by King Carol II of Romania and the Prime Minister, Nicolae Iorga, on 27 May 1931. By 1940, the midships 120 mm gun had been replaced by a pair of twin-gun French Hotchkiss 13.2 mm (0.5 in) anti-aircraft machinegun mounts and the remaining 76 mm guns by a pair of German 3.7 cm (1.5 in) SK C/30 AA guns. Depth charge racks had been fitted on the stern and an Italian depth charge thrower was added. The ships could carry 40 depth charges or 50 mines. These changes reduced the displacement of the sisters to 1,410 long tons (1,430 t) at standard load and 1,723 long tons (1,751 t) at deep load.

==== World War II ====
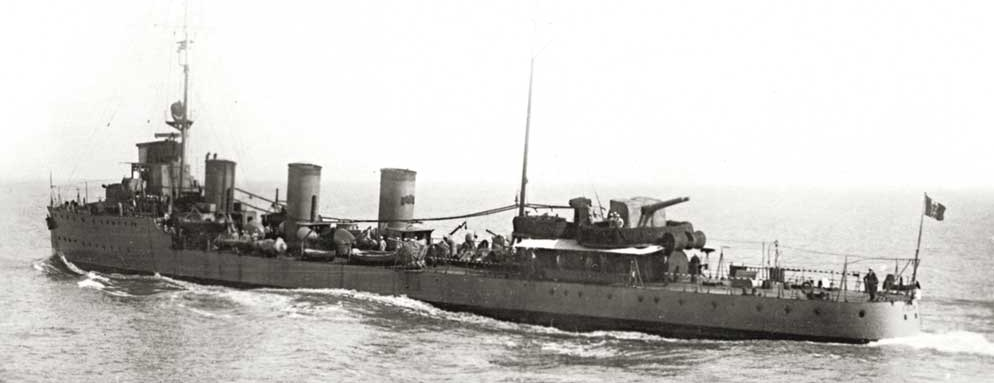
Mărăști at sea, late 1930s

A few days after the invasion of the Soviet Union (Operation Barbarossa) on 22 June 1941, a pair of Leningrad-class destroyer leaders, Moskva and Kharkov, began bombarding Constanța in the early hours of 26 June. The Romanians were expecting a Soviet raid and their defences, consisting of Mărăști, the destroyer Regina Maria and the heavy guns of the German coastal artillery battery Tirpitz, were prepared to engage the Soviet ships. In ten minutes, starting from 03:58, Moskva and Kharkov fired no less than 350 shells from their 130 mm (5.1 in) guns. The two Romanian warships returned fire with their 120 mm (4.7 in) guns at distances between 11,000 to 16,000 m (12,000 to 17,000 yd), but only knocked Moskva's mainmast down. The two Soviet ships were silhouetted against the dawn while the Romanian ships were hidden by the coast behind them. The heavy and accurate Axis fire caused Moskva and Kharkov to begin to withdraw while laying down a smoke screen. As they retreated they entered a Romanian minefield and Moskva sank after striking a mine.

Massively outnumbered by the Black Sea Fleet, the Romanian ships were kept behind the minefields defending Constanța for several months after the start of the war. They spent that time training for convoy escort operations. Beginning on 5 October, the Romanians began laying minefields to defend the route between the Bosphorus and Constanța; the minelayers were protected by the destroyers. After the evacuation of Odessa on 16 October, the Romanians began to clear the Soviet mines defending the port and to lay their own minefields protecting the route between Constanța and Odessa. During the winter of 1941–1942, the Romanian destroyers were primarily occupied with escorting convoys between the Bosporus and Constanța. On 1 December Mărăști, Regina Maria and her sister Regele Ferdinand were escorting a convoy to Odessa when a submarine (Note: Variously identified as D-4 or M-58.) unsuccessfully attacked them. It was quickly spotted and depth charged by Regina Maria and Regele Ferdinand with the latter claiming a kill. Soviet records, however, do not acknowledge any losses on that date.

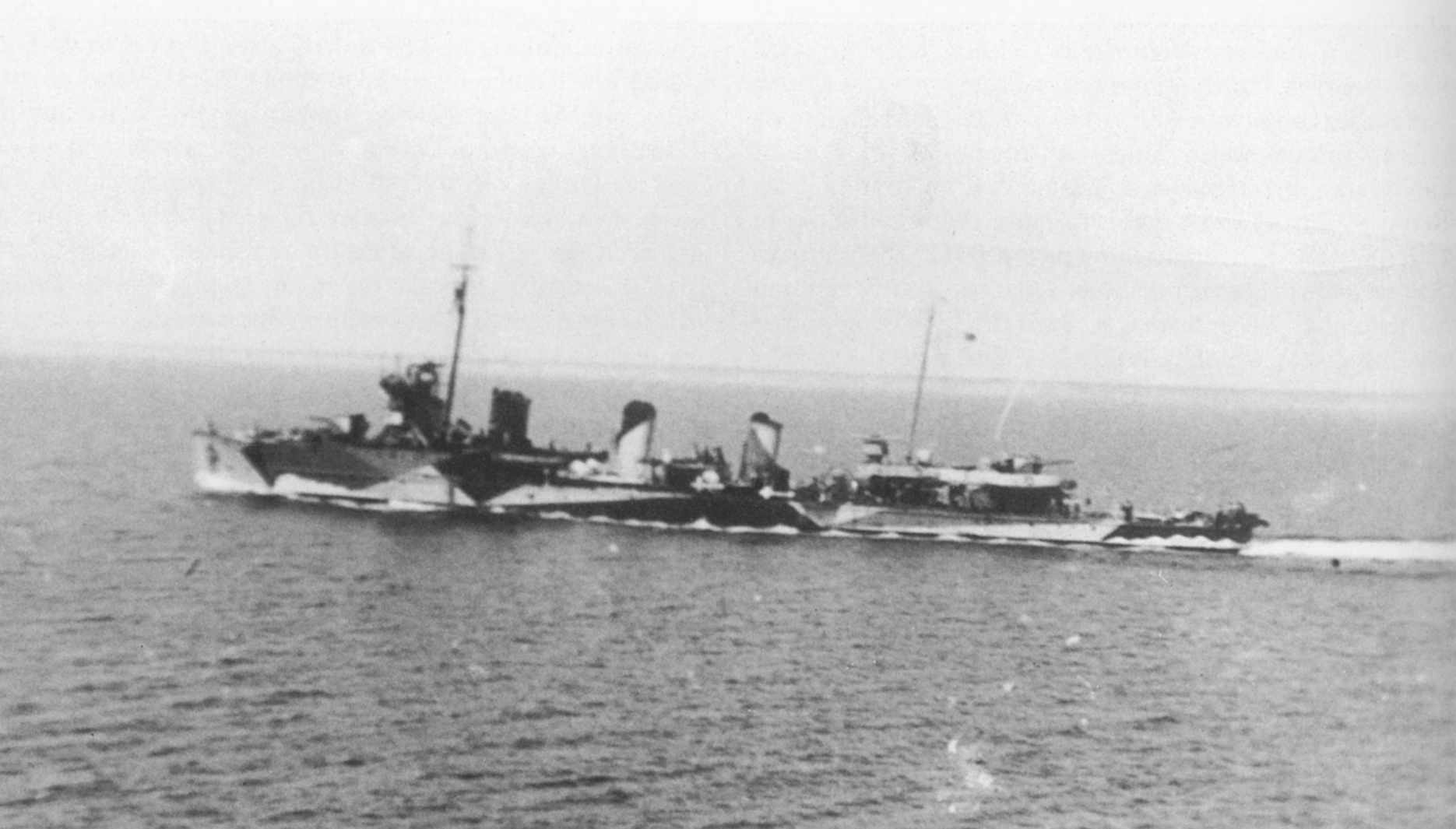
Mărăști in splinter camouflage, 1943

On 20 April 1942, after the ice had melted, Mărăști, Mărășești and Regina Maria escorted the first convoy to Ochakov, although the Romanian destroyers were generally used to escort ships between the Bosporus and Constanța. After Sevastopol surrendered on 4 July, a direct route between the port and Constanța was opened in October and operated year-round. Mărăști and Mărășești and two gunboats were escorting a convoy of three cargo ships on 7 July 1943 when they were attacked by a small wolfpack of three submarines. Shch-201 fired six torpedoes at one of the gunboats and a freighter and missed with all of them. Mărășești depth charged one of the submarines and claimed to have sunk it, but no submarines were lost by the Soviets that day. (Note: This submarine has been identified as M-31, but no losses are listed for the month by naval historians Jürgen Rohwer, Mikhail Monakov, Norman Polmar and Jurrien Noot. The latter pair attribute the loss of M-31 to German aircraft on 2 October, while the former list it as of 17 December 1942 to a German patrol boat.) On the night of 9/10 November, the sisters escorted minelayers as they laid a minefield off Sevastopol.

At some point during the war, the ship's anti-aircraft armament was augmented with two additional 3.7 cm SK C/30 and four 2 cm (0.79 in) AA guns.

Successful Soviet attacks in early 1944 cut the overland connection of the Crimea with the rest of Ukraine and necessitated its supply by sea. In early April another offensive occupied most of the peninsula and encircled Sevastopol. The Romanians began evacuating the city on 14 April, with their destroyers covering the troop convoys. Mărăști ran aground later that month and was under repair for the rest of the war.

After King Michael's Coup on 23 August, Romania declared war on the Axis powers. Mărăști remained in harbour until she was seized by the Soviets on 5 September together with the rest of the Romanian Navy.

=== Soviet Navy ===
The ship was commissioned into the Soviet Navy as part of the Black Sea Fleet along with her sister Mărășești on 14 September 1944. She was renamed Lovkiy on 20 October 1944. After they had spent just over a year in Soviet service, the Soviet Union returned the two destroyers to what by thenwas the People's Republic of Romania on 12 October 1945.

=== People's Republic of Romania ===
In Romanian service, the two destroyers returned to their former names. The sister ships were then assigned to the Destroyer Squadron before beginning an overhaul. When the Destroyer Division was redesignated the 418th Destroyer Division in 1952, Mărăști was renamed D12. The ship continued to serve until April 1961, when she was discarded and subsequently scrapped.

== Bibliography ==
- Axworthy, Mark (1995). Third Axis, Fourth Ally: Romanian Armed Forces in the European War, 1941–1945. London: Arms and Armour Press. ISBN 978-1-85409-267-0.
- Berezhnoy, Sergey (1994). Трофеи и репарации ВМФ СССР [Trophies and Reparations of the Soviet Navy] (in Russian). Yakutsk: Sakhapoligrafizdat. OCLC 33334505.
- Budzbon, Przemysław; Radziemski, Jan & Twardowski, Marek (2022). Warships of the Soviet Fleets 1939–1945. Vol. I: Major Combatants. Annapolis, Maryland: Naval Institute Press. ISBN 978-1-68247-877-6.
- Cernuschi, Enrico & O'Hara, Vincent (2016). "The Naval War in the Adriatic, Part 2: 1917–1918". In Jordan, John (ed.). Warship 2016. London: Conway. pp. 62–75. ISBN 978-1-84486-326-6.
- Cernuschi, Enrico & O'Hara, Vincent P. (2013). "Italy: Regina Marina". In O'Hara, Vincent P.; Dickson, W. David & Worth, Richard (eds.). To Crown the Waves: The Great Navies of the First World War. Annapolis, Maryland: Naval Institute Press. pp. 178–212. ISBN 978-1-61251-082-8.
- Favre, Franco. La Marina nella Grande Guerra. Le operazioni navali, aeree, subacquee e terrestri in Adriatico (in Italian).
- Fraccaroli, Aldo (1985). "Italy". In Gray, Randal (ed.). Conway's All the World's Fighting Ships 1906–1921. Annapolis, Maryland: Naval Institute Press. pp. 252–290. ISBN 978-0-85177-245-5.
- Hervieux, Pierre (2001). "The Romanian Navy at War, 1941–1945". In Preston, Antony (ed.). Warship 2001–2002. London: Conway Maritime Press. pp. 70–88. ISBN 978-0-85177-901-0.
- Polmar, Norman & Noot, Jurrien (1991). Submarines of the Russian and Soviet Navies, 1718–1990. Annapolis, Maryland: Naval Institute Press. ISBN 978-0-87021-570-4.
- Rohwer, Jürgen (2005). Chronology of the War at Sea 1939–1945: The Naval History of World War Two (Third Revised ed.). Annapolis, Maryland: Naval Institute Press. ISBN 978-1-59114-119-8.
- Rohwer, Jürgen & Monakov, Mikhail S. (2001). Stalin's Ocean-Going Fleet: Soviet Naval Strategy and Shipbuilding Programs 1935–1953. London: Frank Cass. ISBN 0-7146-4895-7.
- Rotaru, Jipa & Damaschin, Ioan (2000). Glorie și dramă: Marina Regală Română, 1940–1945 (in Romanian). Editura "Ion Cristoiu". ISBN 978-973-995447-1.
- Twardowski, Marek (1985). "Rumania". In Gray, Randal (ed.). Conway's All the World's Fighting Ships 1906–1921. Annapolis, Maryland: Naval Institute Press. pp. 421–422. ISBN 978-0-85177-245-5.
- Whitley, M. J. (2000). Destroyers of World War Two: An International Encyclopedia. London: Cassell & Co. ISBN 1-85409-521-8.
