= Regele Ferdinand-class destroyer =

Destroyers built in Italy for the Romanian Navy during the 1920s

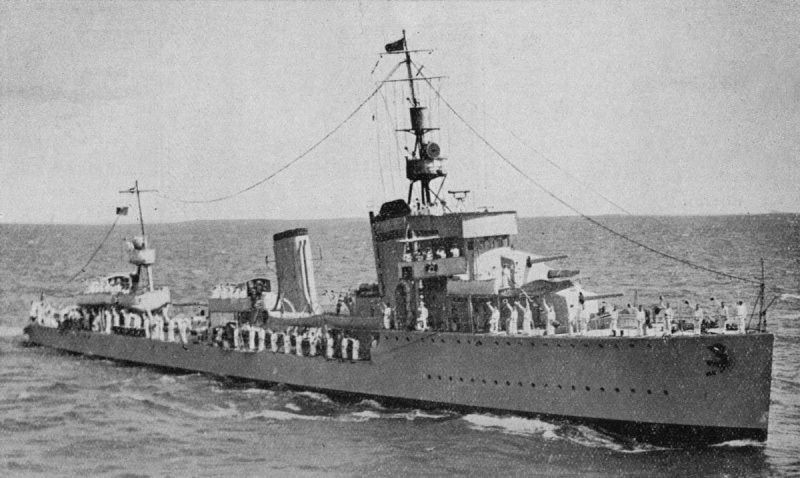
- Regele Ferdinand at sea

Class overview
- Name: Regele Ferdinand class
- Builders: Pattison, Naples, Italy
- Operators: Romanian Navy; Soviet Navy
- Preceded by: Vifor class
- Succeeded by: None
- Built: 1927–1930
- In commission: 1930–1961
- Planned: 4
- Completed: 2
- Canceled: 2
- Scrapped: 2

General characteristics (as built)
- Type: Destroyer
- Displacement: 1,400 long tons (1,422 t) (standard); 1,850 long tons (1,880 t) (full load)
- Length: 101.9 m (334 ft 4 in) (o/a)
- Beam: 9.6 m (31 ft 6 in)
- Draught: 3.51 m (11 ft 6 in)
- Installed power: 4 Thornycroft boilers; 52,000 shp (39,000 kW)
- Propulsion: 2 shafts; 2 geared steam turbines
- Speed: 37 knots (69 km/h; 43 mph)
- Range: 3,000 nmi (5,600 km; 3,500 mi) at 15 knots (28 km/h; 17 mph)
- Complement: 212
- Armament: 5 × single 120 mm (4.7 in) guns; 1 × single 76 mm (3 in) AA gun; 1 × single 40 mm (1.6 in) AA guns; 2 × triple 533 mm (21 in) torpedo tubes; 40 depth charges; 50 mines

The Regele Ferdinand class was a pair of destroyers built in Italy for the Romanian Navy during the late 1920s. The sister ships were the most modern and powerful warships of the Axis powers in the Black Sea during World War II. During the war they participated in the 1941 Raid on Constanța and the 1944 evacuation of the Crimea, although they spent the vast majority of the war escorting convoys in the Black Sea. The Romanians claimed that they sank two submarines during the war, but Soviet records do not confirm their claims. Following King Michael's Coup, where Romania switched sides and joined the Allies in late 1944, the two ships were seized and incorporated into the Soviet Black Sea Fleet. They were returned to Romania in 1951 and served until 1961 when they were scrapped.

== Background and design ==
Following the end of World War I and the re-purchase of two Aquila-class cruisers from Italy, the Romanian Government decided to order several modern destroyers from the Pattison Yard in Naples, Italy, as part of the 1927 Naval Programme. The design was based on the British Shakespeare-class destroyer leaders, but differed in the arrangement of their propulsion machinery. The guns, however, were imported from Sweden and the fire-control system were from Germany. Four destroyers were intended to be ordered, but only two were actually built.

The Regele Ferdinand-class ships had an overall length of 101.9 metres (334 ft 4 in), had a beam of 9.6 metres (31 ft 6 in), and a mean draught of 3.51 metres (11 ft 6 in). They displaced 1,400 long tons (1,422 t) at standard load and 1,850 long tons (1,880 t) at deep load. Their crew numbered 212 officers and sailors. The ships were powered by two Parsons geared steam turbines, each driving a single propeller, using steam provided by four Thornycroft boilers. The turbines were designed to produce 52,000 shaft horsepower (39,000 kW) for a speed of 37 knots (69 km/h; 43 mph), (Note: Twardowski says 48,000 shp (36,000 kW) and a speed of 35 knots (65 km/h; 40 mph).) although the Regele Ferdinands reached 38 knots (70 km/h; 44 mph) during their sea trials. They could carry 480 long tons (490 t) of fuel oil which gave them a range of 3,000 nautical miles (5,600 km; 3,500 mi) at a speed of 15 knots (28 km/h; 17 mph).

The main armament of the Regele Ferdinand-class ships consisted of five 50-calibre Bofors 120-millimetre (4.7 in) guns in single mounts, two superfiring pairs fore and aft of the superstructure and one gun aft of the rear funnel. For anti-aircraft defence, they were equipped with one Bofors 76-millimetre (3 in) anti-aircraft (AA) gun between the funnels and a pair of 40-millimetre (1.6 in) AA guns. The ships were fitted with two triple mounts for 533-millimetre (21 in) torpedo tubes and could carry 50 mines and 40 depth charges. They were equipped with a Siemens fire-control system which included a pair of rangefinders, one each for the fore and aft guns.

=== Modifications ===
The 40-millimetre guns were replaced by two German 3.7-centimetre (1.5 in) AA guns and a pair of French 13.2-millimetre (0.52 in) M1929 Hotchkiss machineguns were added in 1939. Two Italian depth charge throwers were later installed. During World War II, the 76-millimetre gun was replaced by four 20-millimetre (0.79 in) AA guns. In 1943, the two ships were equipped with a German S-Gerät sonar. The following year, the upper forward 120-millimetre gun was replaced by a German 88-millimetre (3.5 in) AA gun. German 88-millimetre guns in Romanian service were themselves modified by being fitted with Romanian-produced barrel liners.

== Ships ==
Construction data
Ship	Laid down	Launched	Commissioned	Fate
Regele Ferdinand (RF)	June 1927	1 December 1928	7 September 1930	Decommissioned and scrapped, April 1961
Regina Maria (RM)	1927	2 March 1929	7 September 1930	Decommissioned and scrapped, April 1961

== Service history ==
The sisters were commissioned into the Romanian Navy when they arrived at Constanța, on 7 September 1930. They were assigned to the Destroyer Squadron, which was visited by King Carol II of Romania and the Prime Minister, Nicolae Iorga, on 27 May 1931. Regina Maria participated in the Coronation Fleet review for King George VI in 1937 at Spithead.

On 26 June 1941, shortly after the Axis invasion of the Soviet Union (Operation Barbarossa), Regina Maria helped repel a Soviet naval attack against the main Romanian port of Constanța, together with the flotilla leader Mărăști. The Romanians were expecting an attack and the accuracy of their fire, reinforced by the heavy guns of the German coastal artillery battery Tirpitz, caused the Soviet ships to withdraw, losing the destroyer leader Moskva in a Romanian minefield that had been laid shortly before the start of the war. Her sister ship Kharkov was lightly damaged by one of the Romanian ships and the heavy cruiser Voroshilov was slightly damaged by a Romanian mine as the Soviets were withdrawing.

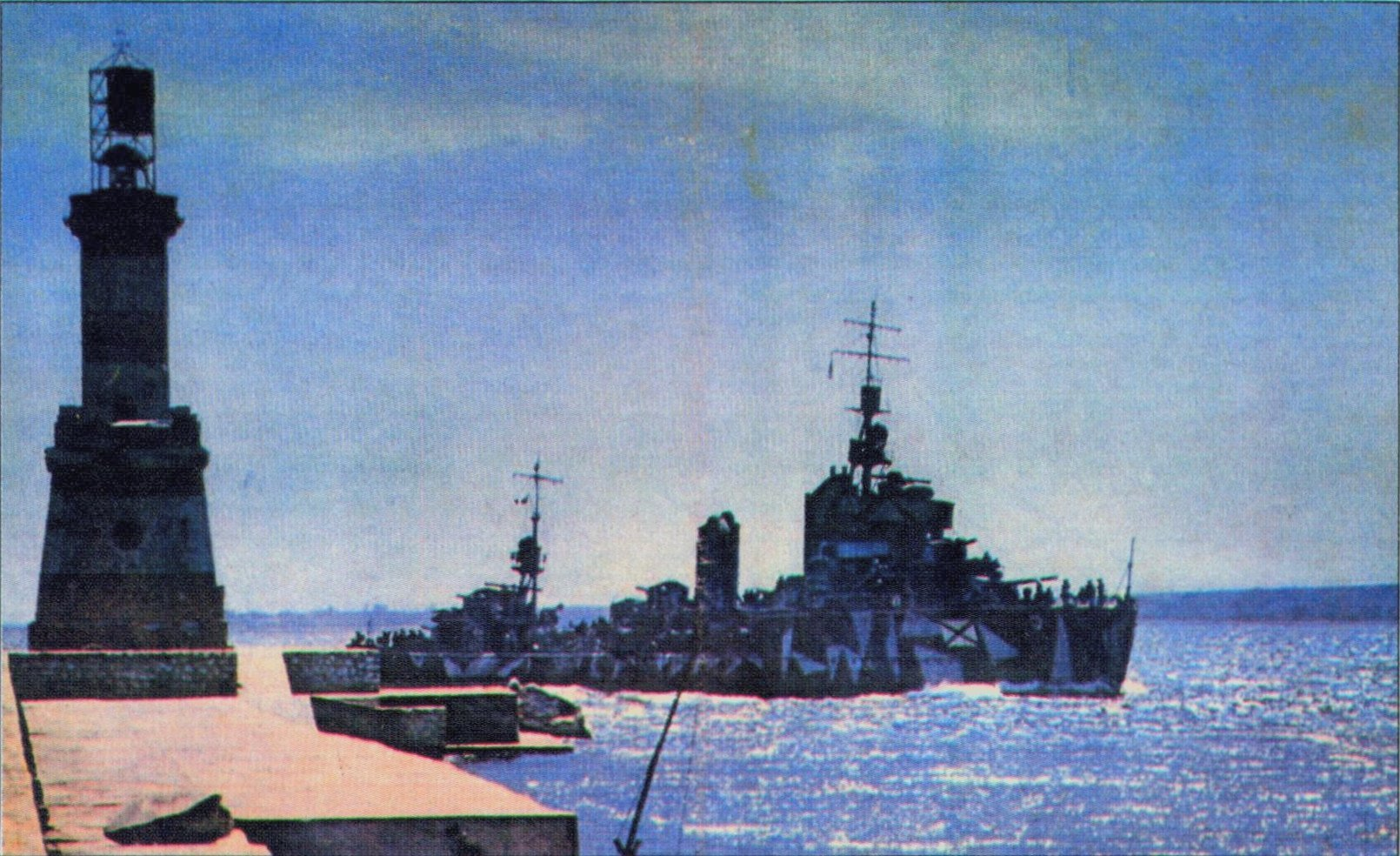
Wartime photo of Regele Ferdinand in splinter camouflage

Massively outnumbered by the Soviet Black Sea Fleet, the Romanian ships were kept behind the minefields defending Constanța for the next several months, training for the convoy escort mission that would be their primary task for the rest of the war. Beginning on 5 October, the Romanians began laying minefields to defend the route between the Bosphorus and Constanța; the minelayers were protected by the destroyers. After the evacuation of Odessa on 16 October, the Romanians began to clear the Soviet mines defending the port and to lay their own minefields protecting the route between Constanța and Odessa. While escorting a convoy to Odessa on 16–17 December, Regele Ferdinand depth-charged and may have sunk the Soviet submarine M-59. (Note: Sources disagree about the date of this submarine's loss. Polmar & Noot say 17 December, but Rohwer & Monakov attribute her loss to a mine between 28 October and 1 November.)

During the winter of 1941–1942, the Romanian destroyers were primarily occupied with escorting convoys between the Bosporus and Constanța, and then, after the ice melted in April 1942, to Ochakov and Odessa. After the garrison of Sevastopol surrendered on 4 July, a direct route between the port and Constanța was opened in October and operated year-round. Regina Maria and Regele Ferdinand also escorted the minelayers as they laid defensive minefields to protect the convoy routes in 1942–1943. The latter ship claimed to have sunk a submarine, possibly Shch-207, on 16 September 1943. Soviet sources, however, do not acknowledge any submarine lost on that day.

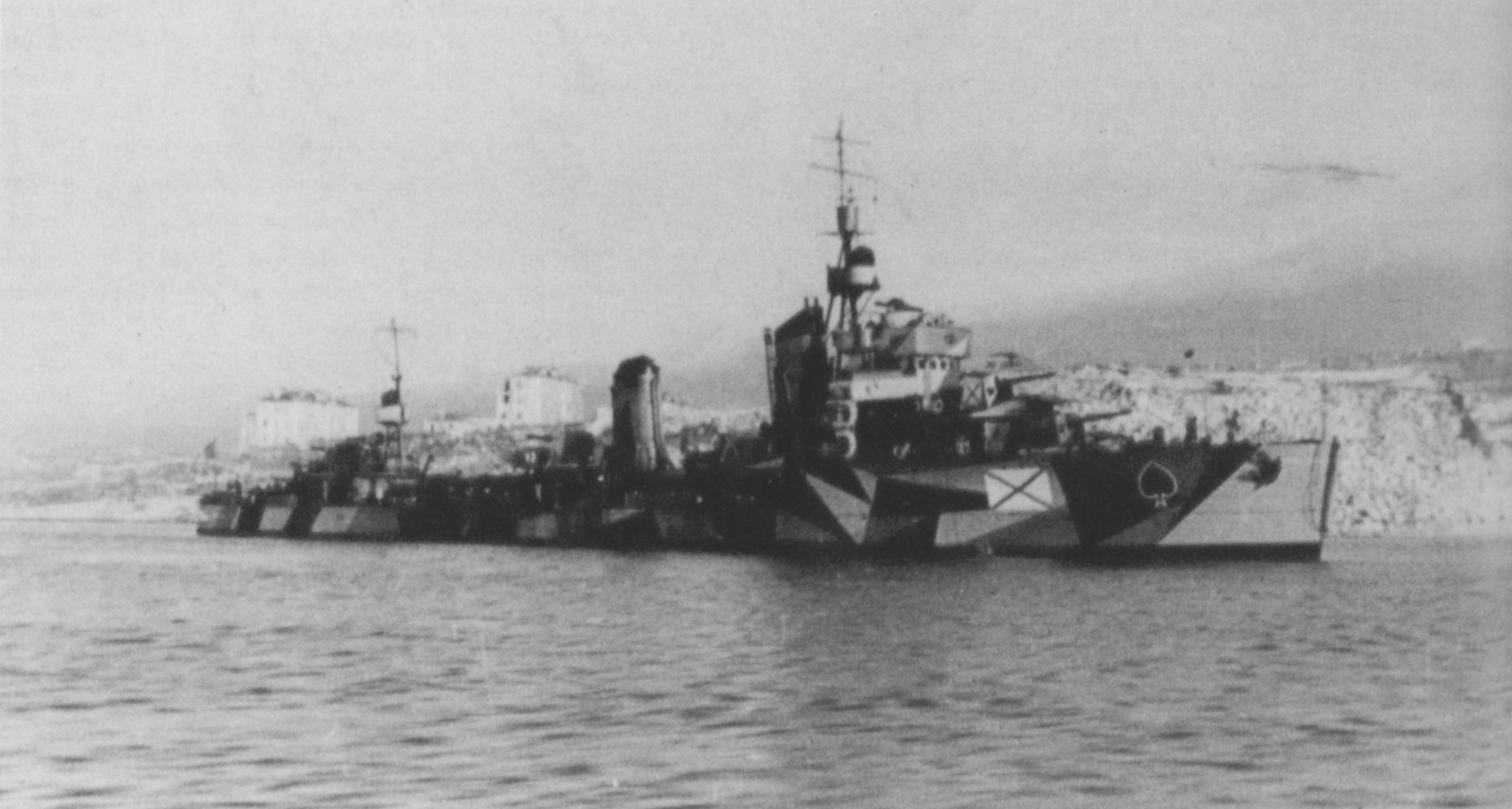
Regina Maria off Sevastopol, 1944

Successful Soviet attacks in early 1944 cut the overland connection of the Crimea with the rest of Ukraine and encircled Axis troops in Sevastopol during April. The Romanians began evacuating the city on 14 April, with their destroyers covering the troop convoys. After the 5,700-gross register ton (GRT) cargo ship SS Alba Iulia was bombed and set on fire by Soviet aircraft on 18 April, the sisters were dispatched to see if she could be salvaged. They put a skeleton crew aboard to operate her pumps and to stabilise her before a pair of tugboats arrived the next morning to tow her to Constanța. Regele Ferdinand was badly damaged by Soviet aircraft on 11 May after having loaded Axis troops at Sevastopol; their attacks damaged her fuel system to the extent that she ran out of fuel despite passing oil hand-to-hand in a bucket brigade and had to be towed a short distance to Constanța. Regina Maria made two trips to evacuate Axis troops and was part of the last convoy to reach Sevastopol on the night of 11/12 May. Regele Ferdinand was slightly damaged during a Soviet airstrike on Constanța on 20 August.

After the capitulation of Romania to the Soviet Union in August 1944, the sisters were seized and incorporated into the Black Sea Fleet as Likhoy (Лихой, ex-Regele Ferdinand) and Letuchiy (Летучий, ex-Regina Maria). They were commissioned into the Soviet Navy on 20 October 1944. The two ships were returned in 1951 and were renamed D21 and D22, respectively, in the Naval Forces of the Romanian People's Republic. They served until 1961 when they were discarded and subsequently scrapped.

== Bibliography ==
- Axworthy, Mark (1995). Third Axis, Fourth Ally: Romanian Armed Forces in the European War, 1941–1945. London: Arms and Armour Press. ISBN 1-85409-267-7.
- Berezhnoy, Sergey (1994). Трофеи и репарации ВМФ СССР [Trophies and reparations of the Soviet Navy] (in Russian). Yakutsk: Sakhapoligrafizdat. OCLC 33334505.
- Budzbon, Przemysław; Radziemski, Jan & Twardowski, Marek (2022). Warships of the Soviet Fleets 1939–1945. Vol. I: Major Combatants. Annapolis, Maryland: Naval Institute Press. ISBN 978-1-68247-877-6.
- Hervieux, Pierre (2001). "The Romanian Navy at War, 1941–1945". In Preston, Antony (ed.). Warship 2001–2002. London: Conway Maritime Press. pp. 70–88. ISBN 0-85177-901-8.
- Polmar, Norman & Noot, Jurrien (1991). Submarines of the Russian and Soviet Navies, 1718–1990. Annapolis, Maryland: Naval Institute Press. ISBN 0-87021-570-1.
- Rohwer, Jürgen (2005). Chronology of the War at Sea 1939–1945: The Naval History of World War Two (Third Revised ed.). Annapolis, Maryland: Naval Institute Press. ISBN 1-59114-119-2.
- Rohwer, Jürgen & Monakov, Mikhail S. (2001). Stalin's Ocean-Going Fleet: Soviet Naval Strategy and Shipbuilding Programs 1935–1953. London: Frank Cass. ISBN 0-7146-4895-7.
- Twardowski, Marek (1980). "Romania". In Chesneau, Roger (ed.). Conway's All the World's Fighting Ships 1922–1946. Greenwich, UK: Conway Maritime Press. pp. 359–362. ISBN 0-85177-146-7.
- Whitley, M. J. (2000). Destroyers of World War Two: An International Encyclopedia. London: Cassell & Co. ISBN 1-85409-521-8.
