= Vifor-class destroyer =

First World War Italian destroyers

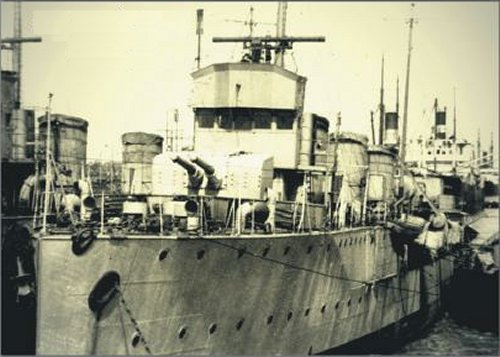
- The Romanian destroyer Mărăști after 1926

Class overview
- Name: Vifor class
- Builders: Pattison, Naples
- Operators: Romanian Naval Forces; Regia Marina; Soviet Navy; Spanish Navy
- Succeeded by: Regele Ferdinand class
- Built: 1914–1918
- In commission: 1917–1961
- Planned: 12
- Completed: 4
- Canceled: 8
- Retired: 4

General characteristics (as built, except for Falco)
- Type: Destroyer
- Displacement: 1,594 long tons (1,620 t) (normal); 1,760 long tons (1,790 t) (full load)
- Length: 94.3 m (309 ft 5 in) (o/a)
- Beam: 9.5 m (31 ft 2 in)
- Draft: 3.6 m (11 ft 10 in)
- Installed power: 4 Thornycroft boilers; 40,000 shp (30,000 kW)
- Propulsion: 2 shafts; 2 geared steam turbines
- Speed: 34 knots (63 km/h; 39 mph)
- Range: 3,000 nmi (5,600 km; 3,500 mi) at 15 knots (28 km/h; 17 mph)
- Complement: 146
- Armament: 3 × single 152 mm (6.0 in) guns; 4 × single 76 mm (3.0 in) AA guns; 2 × twin 457 mm (17.7 in) torpedo tubes; 24–44 mines

The Vifor class was a group of four destroyers ordered by Romania in 1913 and built in Italy during the First World War. The four ships were however requisitioned by Italy in 1915 and rearmed as scout cruisers (esploratori), subsequently seeing service in World War I. Two were re-purchased by Romania in 1920 and saw service in World War II. The other two were eventually transferred by Italy to the Spanish Nationalists and saw service during the Spanish Civil War.

== Construction and specifications ==
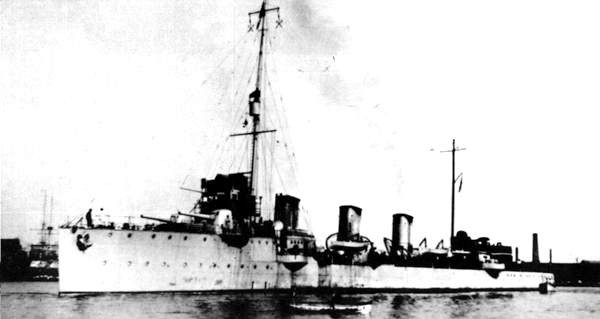
Aquila-class scout cruiser in 1917

The four warships were ordered in 1913 by Romania, from the Pattison Shipyard in Naples, with the names Vifor, Viscol, Vârtej and Vijelie. Designed by engineer Luigi Scaglia and based on Romanian specifications, the ships were to be large destroyers armed with three 120 mm guns, four 75 mm guns, five torpedo tubes, and have a 10-hour endurance at full speed, as they were required to operate in the limited perimeter of the Black Sea. However, the four ships were interned on 5 June 1915, soon after Italy joined the war. At that time, one ship was completed 60%, one 50%, one 20% and the fourth was yet to be laid down. They were completed as scout cruisers (esploratori) and commissioned on 27 July 1916, with the names Aquila, Falco, Nibbio and Sparviero. Aquila was the first to be completed, on 8 February 1917, followed by Sparviero on 15 July, Nibbio on 15 May 1918 and Falco on 20 January 1920.

The four vessels were part of a planned class of 12 units, as envisioned by the 1912 Romanian naval program.

Each scout cruiser measured 94.7 meters in length, with a beam of 9.5 meters and a draught of 3.6 meters. Its power plant consisted of a pair of Tosi steam turbines and five Thornycroft boilers, generating a designed output of 40,000 shaft horsepower (30,000 kW) powering two shafts, which gave each warship a designed top speed of 34 knots (63 km/h; 39 mph). However, this actually oscillated between 35 and 38 knots, depending on the vessel. Each ship had a complement of 146, with ranges of 1,700 nautical miles at 15 knots and 380 nautical miles at 34 knots. Nibbio and Sparviero were each armed with three 152 mm Armstrong guns and four 76 mm dual-purpose (naval/AA) Ansaldo guns, while Aquila and Falco were each armed with two twin 120 mm guns and two 76 mm Ansaldo guns. Each warship also carried two twin 457 mm torpedo tubes and two 6.5 mm machine guns. Nibbio and Falco could also carry mines, 24 and 38 respectively.

As of World War II, standard displacement amounted to 1,432 tons with a full load displacement of 1,751 tons.

Sparviero and Nibbio were sold back to Romania on 1 July 1920, being renamed Mărăști and Mărășești.

== Service history ==
=== Italian service ===
Aquila, Nibbio, and Sparviero entered service in the Italian Regia Marina (Royal Navy) in time to take part in the later stages of the Adriatic campaign of World War I. Most of their war service involved support to coastal torpedo boat and motor torpedo boat raids and air attacks and providing cover for to shore bombardment operations by other ships. Aquila took part in the largest surface naval engagement of the war in the Adriatic Sea, the Battle of the Strait of Otranto, on 15 May 1917, during which the Austro-Hungarian Navy destroyer Csepel scored a hit on Aquila′s boilers which immobilized her, and she had to be towed back to port. While supporting a raid on the coast of the Principality of Albania by Italian coastal torpedo boats on 5 September 1918, Aquila, Nibbio, and Sparviero attacked three Austro-Hungarian torpedo boats engaged in minesweeping, damaging one and forcing them to flee.

Falco was completed in 1920, too late for World War I, but she and Aquila served in the Regia Marina during the interwar period. In 1928, Aquila participated in recovery operations for the Italian submarine F 14, which sank in he Adriatic Sea after a collision.

On 11 October 1937, the government of Fascist Italy unofficially transferred Aquila and Falco to the naval forces of the Spanish Nationalist faction during the Spanish Civil War. Although they already were in Spanish service, the Regia Marina reclassified them as destroyers in 1938. The transfer to Spain finally became official when the Regia Marina struck the two ships from its naval register on 6 January 1939.

=== Romanian service ===
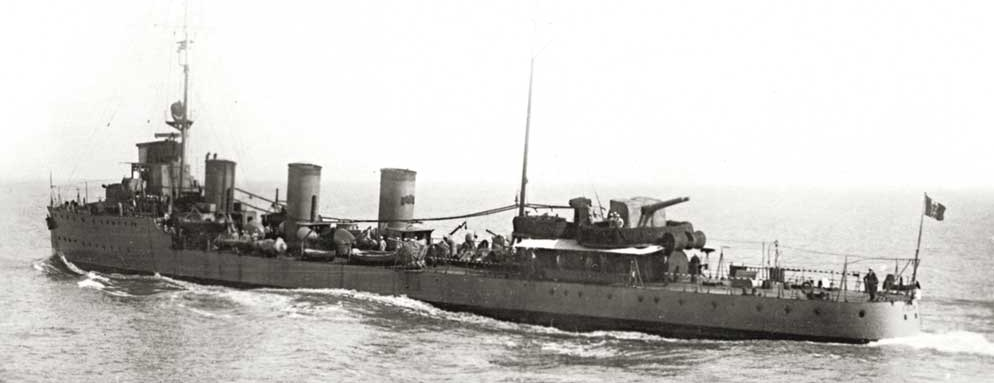
Mărăști during World War II

Upon commissioning by Romania on 1 July 1920, Mărăști and Mărășești were re-classified as destroyers, reverting to their original designation. However, English-language sources of the period refer to the two warships as flotilla leaders, most likely on account of their three cruiser-typical 152 mm guns. Mărăști and Mărășești were refitted at the Galați shipyard in Romania in 1925, and sent back to Naples for rearming in 1926.

The two rearmed warships are also known as the Mărăști-class. As of 1939, when the Second World War started, their artillery approached cruiser standards, amounting to nine heavy naval guns (five of 120 mm and four of 76 mm). In addition, they retained their two twin 457 mm torpedo tubes as well as two machine guns, plus the capacity to carry up to 50 mines. They thus became the most heavily-armed warships in the history of the Royal Romanian Navy, apart from the battleship Potemkin, which was de facto under Romanian control for a brief time in July 1905. All these guns increased their standard displacement to 1,460 tons. Three of these heavy guns (one 120 mm and two 76 mm) were removed in order to make room for two 37 mm and four 20 mm anti-aircraft guns plus two depth charge throwers (one of 900 mm and one of 330 mm). Despite having their heavy armament reduced to destroyer standards, the two warships still presented some cruiser characteristics, such as retaining their torpedo tubes mounted on the broadsides instead of the centerline.

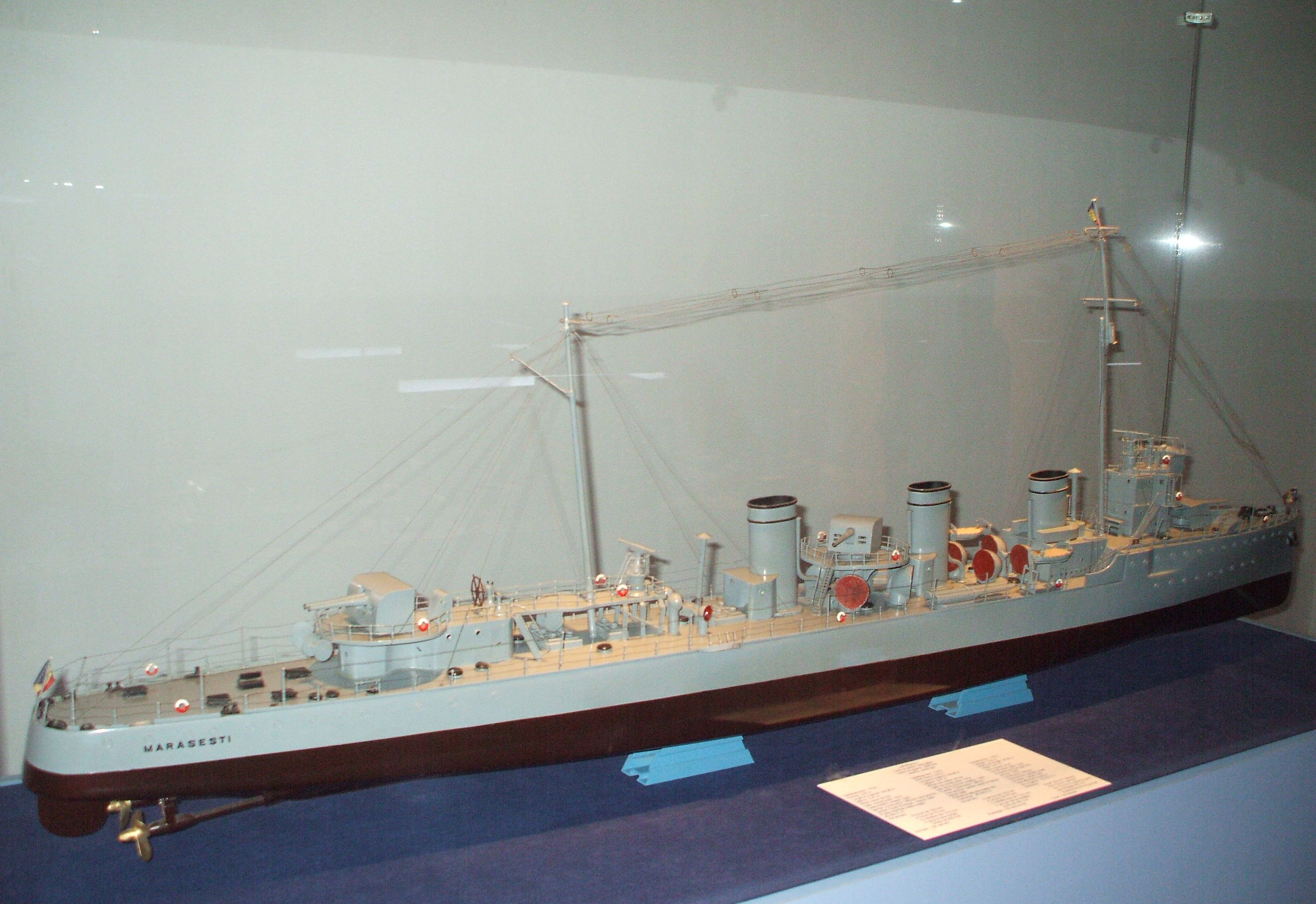
Scale model of Mărășești showing her intermediary armament, after two 76 mm guns were removed but before the midships single 120 mm gun was (one of the twin torpedo tubes is also visible on the broadside)

During World War II, Mărăști and Mărășești were the most heavily-armed Axis warships in the Black Sea, and had the greatest standard displacement. Both ships were active during the Romanian naval campaign in the Black Sea in World War II, mainly providing escort for Axis supply convoys between Romania, the Crimean Peninsula, and the Bosphorus. On 26 June 1941, Mărăști helped repel a Soviet naval attack against the main Romanian port of Constanța, together with the destroyer Regina Maria and the minelayer Amiral Murgescu. Surprised by the level of resistance and the accuracy of the return fire, the Soviet fleet withdrew, losing the destroyer leader Moskva in a Romanian minefield laid by the Romanian minelayers Amiral Murgescu, Regele Carol I and the minelayer Aurora on 19 June 1941. Amiral Murgescu claimed to have shot down two Soviet aircraft during the battle and Mărăști claimed one.

During Romania's participation in the war on the side of the Axis, Mărăști carried out a total of 28 escort missions and Mărășești 21. There were six escort missions in which both warships took part, resulting in a grand total of 55 escort missions. During these missions, the Axis convoys were attacked numerous times by Soviet submarines and aviation, and many Soviet mines were also encountered. Four of the escorted ships were sunk, one by Soviet aircraft and three by Soviet submarines. On the opposite side, one Soviet submarine was sunk, one aircraft was shot down and 14 mines were destroyed. When Romania surrendered to the Soviet Union in August 1944 and switched to the Allied side, Mărăști and Mărășești were handed over to the Soviet Navy. After over a year in Soviet service (August 1944 – October 1945), the Soviet Union returned the two destroyers to Romania. Mărăști was stricken in 1964 and Mărășești in 1965.

=== Spanish service ===
Unofficially transferred from Italy to the Spanish Nationalist faction on 11 October 1937 during the Spanish Civil War, Aquila and Falco were renamed Melilla and Ceuta, respectively, in Spanish service. To conceal the fact that Italy was selling ships to Francisco Franco's side in the war, the two warships were often referred to as Velasco-Ceuta and Velasco-Melilla, and the Spanish Nationalists added a dummy fourth funnel to each ship to increase their resemblance to Velasco, the only non-ex-Italian destroyer under Nationalist control. Although the two scout cruisers were already in Spanish Nationalist service, the Regia Marina reclassified them as destroyers on 5 September 1938. The transfer finally became official and overt on 6 January 1939 when they were stricken by the Regia Marina.

Melilla and Ceuta saw heavy service — primarily in surveillance and escort tasks — during the Spanish Civil War in spite of their poor condition. In August 1938, they joined the heavy cruiser Canarias in an action that forced the Spanish Republican Navy destroyer José Luis Díez to give up on running the Nationalist blockade of the Strait of Gibraltar to reach Cartagena and instead to take refuge at Gibraltar. Ceuta also captured the French merchant ship Prado, which was operating in support of the Spanish Republicans.

After the war, they were retained by the Spanish Navy and served mainly as training ships. Ceuta was stricken in 1948 and Melilla in late 1950.

=== Soviet service ===
Both Romanian ships surrendered to the Soviets in August 1944 upon the capitulation of Romania and were incorporated into the Soviet Black Sea Fleet as Lovkiy (Ловкий, ex-Mărăști) and Lyogkiy (Лёгкий, ex-Mărășești). The Soviets returned them to Romania in October 1945.

== Ships ==
List of Vifor-class destroyers
Ship	Builder	Laid down	launched	Commissioned	Transferred to Romania/Spain	Fate
Mărăști (ex-Sparviero, ex-Vijelie)	Pattison, Naples, Italy	29 January 1914	26 March 1917	15 July 1917	1 July 1920	Stricken, 1964
Mărășești (ex-Nibbio, ex-Vârtej)	Pattison, Naples, Italy	15 July 1914	30 January 1918	15 May 1918	1 July 1920	Stricken, 1965
Melilla (ex-Aquila, ex-Vifor)	Pattison, Naples, Italy	11 March 1914	26 July 1916	8 February 1917	11 October 1937 (unofficially); 5 January 1939 (officially)	Scrapped, 1950
Ceuta (ex-Falco, ex-Viscol)	Pattison, Naples, Italy	19 August 1916	16 August 1919	20 January 1920	11 October 1937 (unofficially); 5 January 1939 (officially)	Scrapped, 1948

== Bibliography ==
- Axworthy, Mark (1995). Third Axis, Fourth Ally: Romanian Armed Forces in the European War, 1941–1945. London: Arms and Armour Press. ISBN 1-85409-267-7.
- Berezhnoy, Sergey (1994). Трофеи и репарации ВМФ СССР [Trophies and reparations of the Soviet Navy] (in Russian). Yakutsk: Sakhapoligrafizdat. OCLC 33334505.
- Budzbon, Przemysław; Radziemski, Jan & Twardowski, Marek (2022). Warships of the Soviet Fleets 1939–1945. Vol. I: Major Combatants. Annapolis, Maryland: Naval Institute Press. ISBN 978-1-68247-877-6.
- Cernuschi, Enrico & O'Hara, Vincent (2016). "The Naval War in the Adriatic, Part 2: 1917–1918". In Jordan, John (ed.). Warship 2016. London: Conway. ISBN 978-1-84486-326-6.
- Fraccaroli, Aldo (1985). "Italy". In Gray, Randal (ed.). Conway's All the World's Fighting Ships 1906–1921. Annapolis: Naval Institute Press. pp. 252–290. ISBN 978-0-87021-907-8.
- Favre, Franco. La Marina nella Grande Guerra. Le operazioni navali, aeree, subacquee e terrestri in Adriatico (in Italian).
- Halpern, Paul G. (1995). A Naval History of World War I. Annapolis: Naval Institute Press. ISBN 1-55750-352-4.
- Hervieux, Pierre (2001). "The Romanian Navy at War, 1941–1945". In Preston, Antony (ed.). Warship 2001–2002. London: Conway Maritime Press. pp. 70–88. ISBN 0-85177-901-8.
- Rohwer, Jürgen (2005). Chronology of the War at Sea 1939–1945: The Naval History of World War Two (Third Revised ed.). Annapolis, Maryland: Naval Institute Press. ISBN 1-59114-119-2.
- Rohwer, Jürgen & Monakov, Mikhail S. (2001). Stalin's Ocean-Going Fleet: Soviet Naval Strategy and Shipbuilding Programs 1935–1953. London: Frank Cass. ISBN 0-7146-4895-7.
- Twardowski, Marek (1980). "Romania". In Chesneau, Roger (ed.). Conway's All the World's Fighting Ships 1922–1946. Greenwich, UK: Conway Maritime Press. pp. 359–362. ISBN 0-85177-146-7.
- Whitley, M. J. (1988). Destroyers of World War 2: An International Encyclopedia. London: Cassell Publishing. ISBN 1-85409-521-8.
