= Esploratore =

Type of Italian warship intermediate between destroyers and light cruisers

An esploratore (meaning "scout") was a type of Italian warship intermediate between destroyers and light cruisers. Before World War II, existing esploratori were reclassified as destroyers (Italian: cacciatorpediniere).

There was a further group of warships (Capitani Romani class), larger than esploratori, classed as esploratori oceanici, that were effectively unarmoured light cruisers.

== Esploratori classes ==
- Mirabello class
- Leone class
- Navigatori class

== See also ==
- Italian World War II destroyers
- Destroyer leader
- Flotilla leader
- Scout cruiser
