= Romanian Navy during World War II =

Warships of the Romanian Navy during the Second World War
	Number of units
Destroyers	4
Frigates	1
Sea-going ironclads	5
Sea-going torpedo boats	3
Coastguard cruisers	3
Submarines	8
Other	~50

The Romanian Navy during World War II was the main Axis naval force in the Black Sea campaigns and fought against the Soviet Union's Black Sea Fleet from 1941 to 1944. Operations consisted mainly of mine warfare, but there were also escort missions and localized naval engagements. The largest naval action fought by the Romanian Navy was the 26 June 1941 Raid on Constanța, and its most extensive operation was the 1944 evacuation of the Crimea.

== The Romanian Black Sea Fleet in June 1941 ==
Vessel	Origin	Type	Notes
Main surface warships
Regele Carol I	United Kingdom	Seaplane tender/Minelayer	Built in the United Kingdom in 1898, sunk in October 1941
Mărăști	Italy	Flotilla leader	Built in Italy for the Romanian Navy, entered service in 1920
Mărășești	Italy	Flotilla leader	Built in Italy for the Romanian Navy, entered service in 1920
Regele Ferdinand	Italy	Destroyer	Built in Italy for the Romanian Navy, entered service in 1930
Regina Maria	Italy	Destroyer	Built in Italy for the Romanian Navy, entered service in 1930
Amiral Murgescu	Romania	Minelayer-frigate	Built at the Galați shipyard in Romania between 1938 and 1941; sizable (1,000+ tons) well-armed multi-purpose warship
Sborul	Austria-Hungary	Sea-going torpedo boat	Built in Austria-Hungary during World War I, acquired by Romania after the end of the war
Bistrița	United Kingdom	Coastguard cruiser	Built in London in 1888
Oltul	United Kingdom	Coastguard cruiser	Built in London in 1888
Siretul	United Kingdom	Coastguard cruiser	Built in London in 1888
Sea-going ironclads
Mihail Kogălniceanu	Austria-Hungary; Romania	Monitor	Built in Austria-Hungary, assembled and launched in Romania in 1907; served as anti-submarine escort fitted with two depth charge throwers
Ion Brătianu	Austria-Hungary; Romania	Monitor	Built in Austria-Hungary, assembled and launched in Romania in 1907; served as anti-submarine escort fitted with two depth charge throwers
Alexandru Lahovari	Austria-Hungary; Romania	Monitor	Built in Austria-Hungary, assembled and launched in Romania in 1907; served as anti-submarine escort fitted with two depth charge throwers
Lascăr Catargiu	Austria-Hungary; Romania	Monitor	Built in Austria-Hungary, assembled and launched in Romania in 1907; served as anti-submarine escort fitted with two depth charge throwers
Bucovina	Austria-Hungary	Monitor	Built in Austria-Hungary in 1915, acquired by Romania after World War I; fitted for service at sea with one depth charge thrower
Escort corvettes
Sublocotenent Ghiculescu	France	Escort gunboat	Built in France during World War I, acquired by Romania after the end of the war
Eugen Stihi	France	Escort gunboat	Built in France during World War I, acquired by Romania after the end of the war
Căpitan Dumitrescu	France	Escort gunboat	Built in France during World War I, acquired by Romania after the end of the war
Smeul	Austria-Hungary	Escort gunboat (ex-torpedo boat)	Built in Austria-Hungary during World War I as torpedo boat, acquired by Romania after the end of the war and converted to escort gunboat
Năluca	Austria-Hungary	Escort gunboat (ex-torpedo boat)	Built in Austria-Hungary during World War I as torpedo boat, acquired by Romania after the end of the war and converted to escort gunboat; sunk August 1944
Fast attack craft
Viscolul	United Kingdom	Motor torpedo boat	Built in the United Kingdom in the late 1930s, acquired by Romania in 1940
Viforul	United Kingdom	Motor torpedo boat	Built in the United Kingdom in the late 1930s, acquired by Romania in 1940; sunk November 1941
Vijelia	United Kingdom	Motor torpedo boat	Built in the United Kingdom in the late 1930s, acquired by Romania in 1940; sunk November 1941
Căpitan Romano Mihail	United Kingdom	Armored motor launch	Built in the United Kingdom in 1906-1907
Locotenent Dimitrie Călinescu	United Kingdom	Armored motor launch	Built in the United Kingdom in 1906-1907
Maior Gheorghe Șonțu	United Kingdom	Armored motor launch	Built in the United Kingdom in 1906-1907
Floating batteries
K-2	Russia	Floating battery	Built in Russia during World War I as landing craft; converted to floating battery armed with two 152 mm guns and acquired by Romania in February 1918
K-7	Russia	Floating battery	Built in Russia during World War I as landing craft; converted to floating battery armed with two 152 mm guns and acquired by Romania in February 1918
Submarines
Delfinul	Italy	Submarine	Built in Italy for the Romanian Navy, entered service in 1936

== Operations in the Black Sea ==
Romanian Navy during the World War II Black Sea Campaign
- Part of the Black Sea campaigns (1941-1944)
Date	26 June 1941 – 23 August 1944
Location	Black Sea
Result	Soviet victory

Belligerents
Romania	Soviet Union

Commanders and leaders
Horia Macellariu	(Soviet Union) Filipp Oktyabrskiy

Casualties and losses
1 seaplane tender 2 gunboats 1 minelayer 2 motor torpedo boats	1 destroyer 16 submarines (1 shared); 2 motor gunboats 1 motor torpedo boat (shared)

=== Beginning and main engagement ===
The naval war in the Black Sea commenced with the Raid on Constanța on 26 June 1941, the only encounter between major warships during the entire campaign. The Romanian flotilla leader Mărăști and the destroyer Regina Maria together with the minelayer Amiral Murgescu defended the port against the Soviet cruiser Voroshilov and the Leningrad-class destroyer leaders Kharkov and Moskva. The Romanian warships were supported by coastal artillery, including the German coastal battery Tirpitz (nominally under Romanian command) and the Soviet warships by Tupolev SB bombers. The raid was a Soviet failure, only amounting to several fuel tanks set on fire. No Romanian warship was sunk while the Soviet destroyer leader Moskva was lost to a Romanian minefield as she was avoiding fire from the Romanian warships and coastal artillery.

=== Other engagements ===
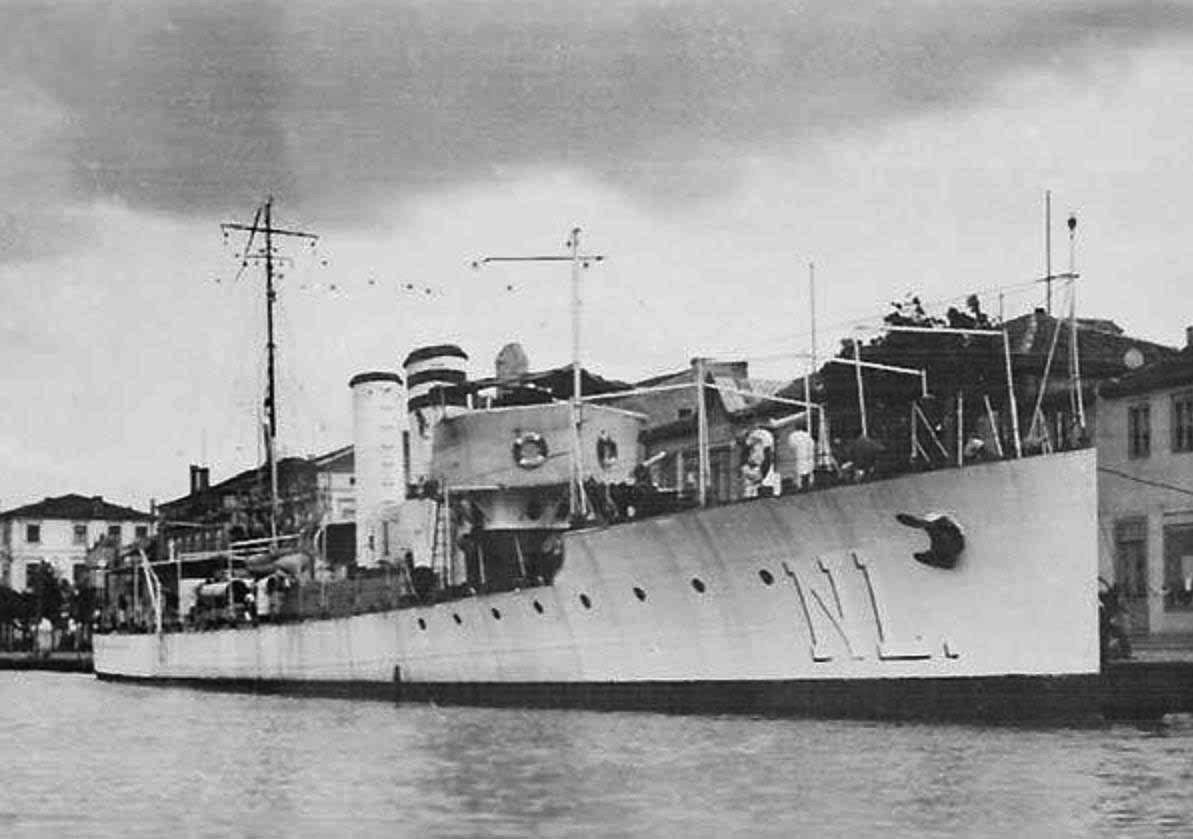
Romanian gunboat Năluca (ex-torpedo boat)

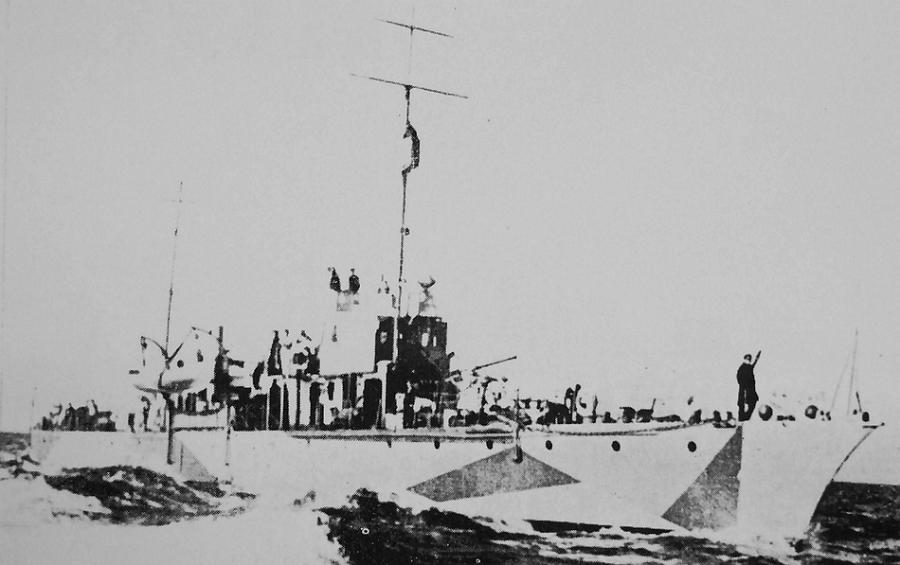
Romanian gunboat Stihi

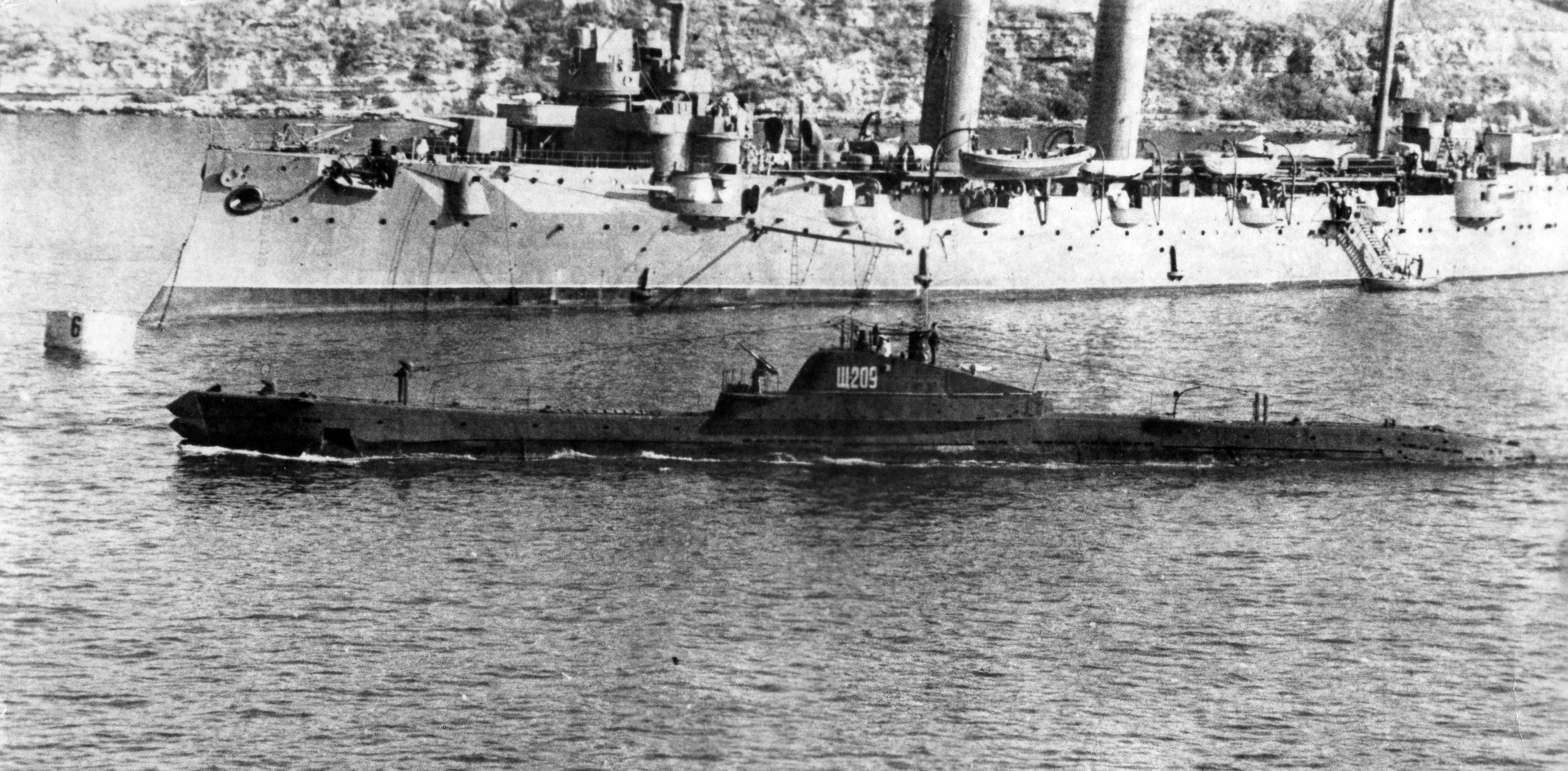
Soviet Shchuka-class submarine in the Black Sea

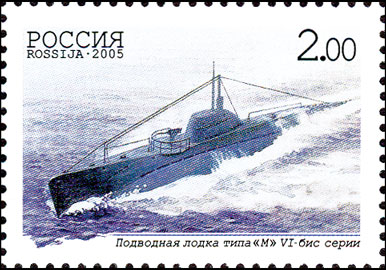
Soviet M-class submarine

On 9 July 1941, near the Romanian Black Sea port of Mangalia, the Romanian gunboat Stihi informed the Romanian 250t-class torpedo boat Năluca (converted to gunboat) and motor torpedo boats Viscolul and Vijelia that the periscope of an enemy submarine was sighted near the harbor. In the ensuing battle, the Soviet Shchuka-class submarine Shch-206 was attacked by Năluca, at first with 20 mm rounds and then with depth charges, eventually being sunk with all hands.

On 17 December 1941, near the Bessarabian coast, the Romanian destroyer Regele Ferdinand, while escorting a convoy of Bulgarian and Hungarian cargo ships, depth-charged and sank the Soviet M-class submarine M-59, after the latter unsuccessfully attacked the convoy with torpedoes. According to other sources however submarine M-59 was lost due to mines earlier that date.

On 1 October, the Soviet submarine M-118 attacked and sank the German transport ship Salzburg. After attacking, the submarine was located by a German BV 138C flying boat, and the Romanian gunboats Sublocotenent Ghiculescu and Stihi Eugen were sent to the scene. The two Romanian warships attacked the submarine with depth charges, sinking her with all hands. Recent surveys in the area failed to find the wreck in the alleged sinking location and it has been raised the alternative version that M-118 was lost due German seaplane attack or a Romanian field from barrage "S-30".

=== Evacuation of the Crimea ===
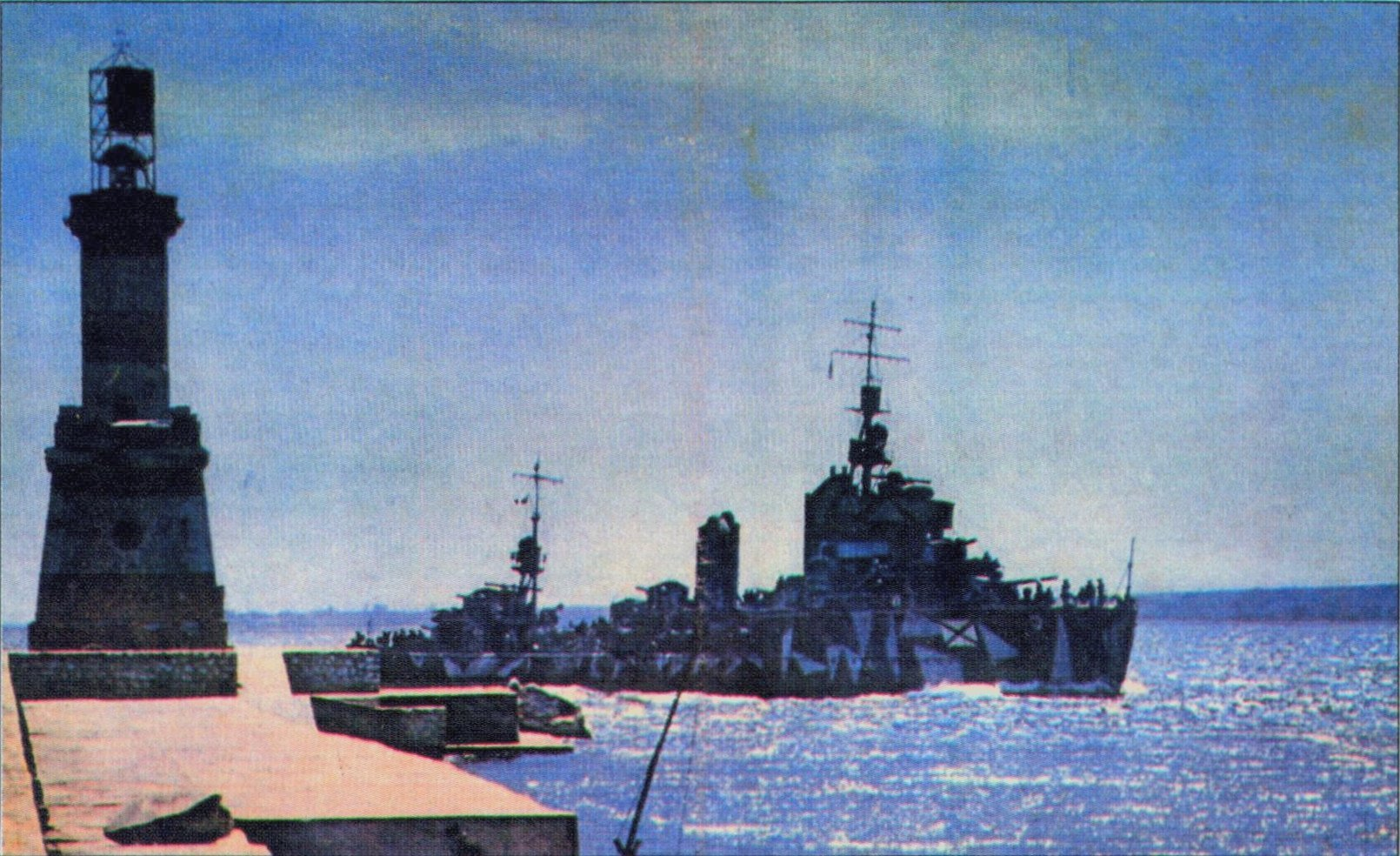
Romanian destroyer Regele Ferdinand

Soviet G-5-class motor torpedo boat

The evacuation of the Crimea in April–May 1944 was the most complex and extensive operation of the Romanian Navy during the Second World War. From 15 April to 14 May, numerous German and Romanian warships escorted many convoys between Constanța and Sevastopol. The scale and importance of the operation can be attested by the usage in combat of all four warships of the Romanian Destroyer Squadron, the largest Axis warships in the Black Sea. The last phase of the evacuation (10-14 May) saw the fiercest combat, as Axis ships transported, under constant attacks from Soviet aircraft and shore artillery, over 30,000 troops. Of these, 18,000 were transported by Romanian ships. In total, Romanian and German convoys evacuated over 113,000 Axis troops from the Crimea, most of them (over 63,000) during the first phase of the evacuation (15-25 April). This achievement earned the Romanian naval commander, Rear-Admiral Horia Macellariu, the Knight's Cross of the Iron Cross (Crucea de Cavaler a Crucii de Fier, in Romanian). No Romanian Navy warships were lost during the evacuation, however the destroyer Regele Ferdinand was close to being sunk. She was struck by a large aerial bomb, which fell in her fuel tanks, but failed to detonate. The bomb was extracted several days after the end of the operation. Two naval actions involving the Romanian Navy took place during the second phase of the evacuation (25 April-10 May), near Sevastopol. On 18 April, the Soviet Leninets-class submarine L-6 was twice attacked with depth charges and damaged by the Romanian gunboat Ghiculescu, numerous bubbles emerged from the depths after each attack, before being finished off by the German submarine hunter UJ-104. During the night of 27 April, a convoy escorted by the Romanian gunboat Ghiculescu, the German submarine hunter UJ-115, one R-boat, two KFK naval trawlers and 19 MFPs (including the Romanian PTA-404 and PTA-406) engaged the Soviet G-5-class motor torpedo boats TKA-332, TKA-343 and TKA-344, after the three attacked and damaged the German submarine hunter UJ-104 (never recovered). Ghiculescu opened fire with tracer rounds, enabling the entire escort group to locate the two Soviet MTBs and open fire. TKA-332 was hit and sunk.

=== Mine warfare ===
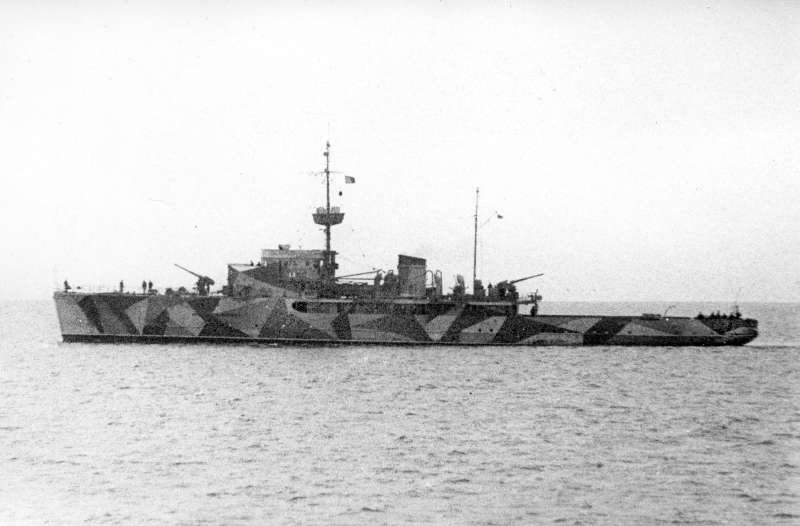
Romanian minelayer/destroyer escort Amiral Murgescu

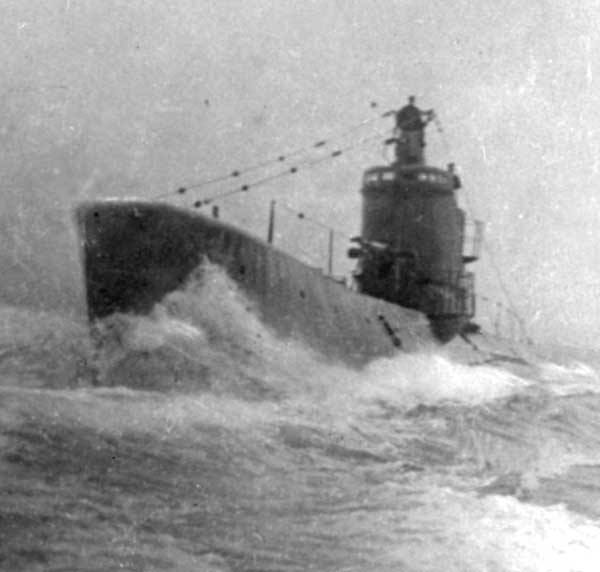
Soviet submarine L-24, the largest submarine sunk by Romanian mines

The majority of naval losses, both inflicted and suffered by the Romanian Navy, were caused by naval mines.

Days before Operation Barbarossa, between 16 and 19 June 1941, the Romanian minelayer Amiral Murgescu along with two auxiliary minelayers laid a barrage of 1,000 mines off Constanța, and it was these mines that would sink Moskva one week later. Throughout the war, the mines laid off Constanța also sank four Soviet submarines (Shch-213, M-58, M-34 and Shch-208).

Between 7 and 16 October 1941, Amiral Murgescu along with two auxiliary minelayers, all three escorted by the Romanian 250t-class torpedo boats Năluca, Sborul and Smeul, the Romanian gunboats Sublocotenent Ghiculescu and Căpitan Dumitrescu and the Bulgarian torpedo boats Drazki, Smeli and Hrabri, laid four full minefields and one partial minefield along the Bulgarian coast. These mines later sank three-four Soviet submarines (the S-class S-34 (claimed also by Bulgarian mines), L-24, Shch-210 and Shch-211).

On 9 November 1941, the Romanian motor torpedo boats Viforul and Vijelia were sunk near Odessa by Soviet mines.

On 24 June 1942, Amiral Murgescu along with one auxiliary minelayer laid mines off Odessa, while being escorted by the Romanian destroyers Regele Ferdinand and Regina Maria, the Romanian flotilla leader Mărășești, the Romanian gunboats Ghiculescu, Stihi and Dumitrescu and the Romanian gunboat Smeul (ex-torpedo boat), as well as German motor minesweepers of the Donau Flotilla. The mines laid near Odessa later sank the Soviet submarines M-33 and M-60 and the motor gunboats YA-26 and YA-27 in 1944.

On 29–30 October and 5 November 1942, Amiral Murgescu along with one auxiliary minelayer, escorted by the Romanian destroyers Regina Maria and Regele Ferdinand, the Romanian leader Mărăști, the Romanian gunboat Stihi and four German R-boats laid two mine barrages to protect Snake Island. These mines sank the Soviet submarine Shch-212 on 11 December that same year. The Soviet submarine M-31 was either sunk as well by the Romanian mine barrages near the island on 17 December, or sunk by the Romanian leader Mărășești in 1943.

== Romanian naval operations in support of Axis land offensives ==
Romanian naval operations in support of Axis land offensives
- Part of the Eastern Front of World War II
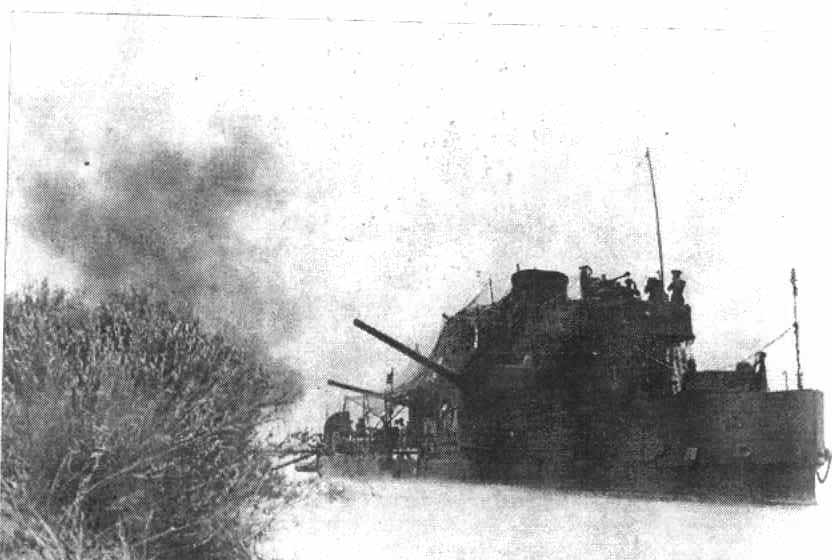
- Romanian monitor Mihail Kogălniceanu
Date	2 July 1941 – 19 November 1942
Location	Black Sea, Danube Delta
Result	Romanian tactical victory

Belligerents
Romania	Soviet Union

Casualties and losses
1 submarine damaged 1 flying boat sunk	1 destroyer damaged 2 submarines sunk 2 monitors damaged 7 armored motor gunboats sunk 1 cargo ship sunk 1 armed merchantman captured

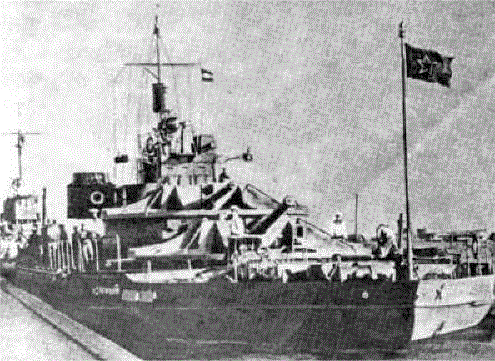
Soviet monitor Udarnyy

=== Operation München ===
Romanian warships and marines in the Danube Delta supported the Romanian-German ground forces during their offensive into Bessarabia, at the start of July 1941. Thus, the artillery of the Romanian 17th Marine Infantry Battalion, operating in the Periprava sector, shelled and sank six Soviet armored motor gunboats. One more armored motor gunboat was sunk at Isaccea by the riverine artillery of a Romanian Marine Infantry detachment. Naval engagements took place on 13 and 14 July, near the mouth of the Danube, on each day the Romanian monitor Mihail Kogălniceanu engaging and damaging a Soviet monitor, the latter being identified as Udarnyy. These actions, combined with the Axis ground troops advancing from the north, determined the Soviet Danube Flotilla to evacuate the Danube Delta on 18–19 July, allowing the Romanian marines to cross the Chilia branch and occupy Southern Bessarabia.

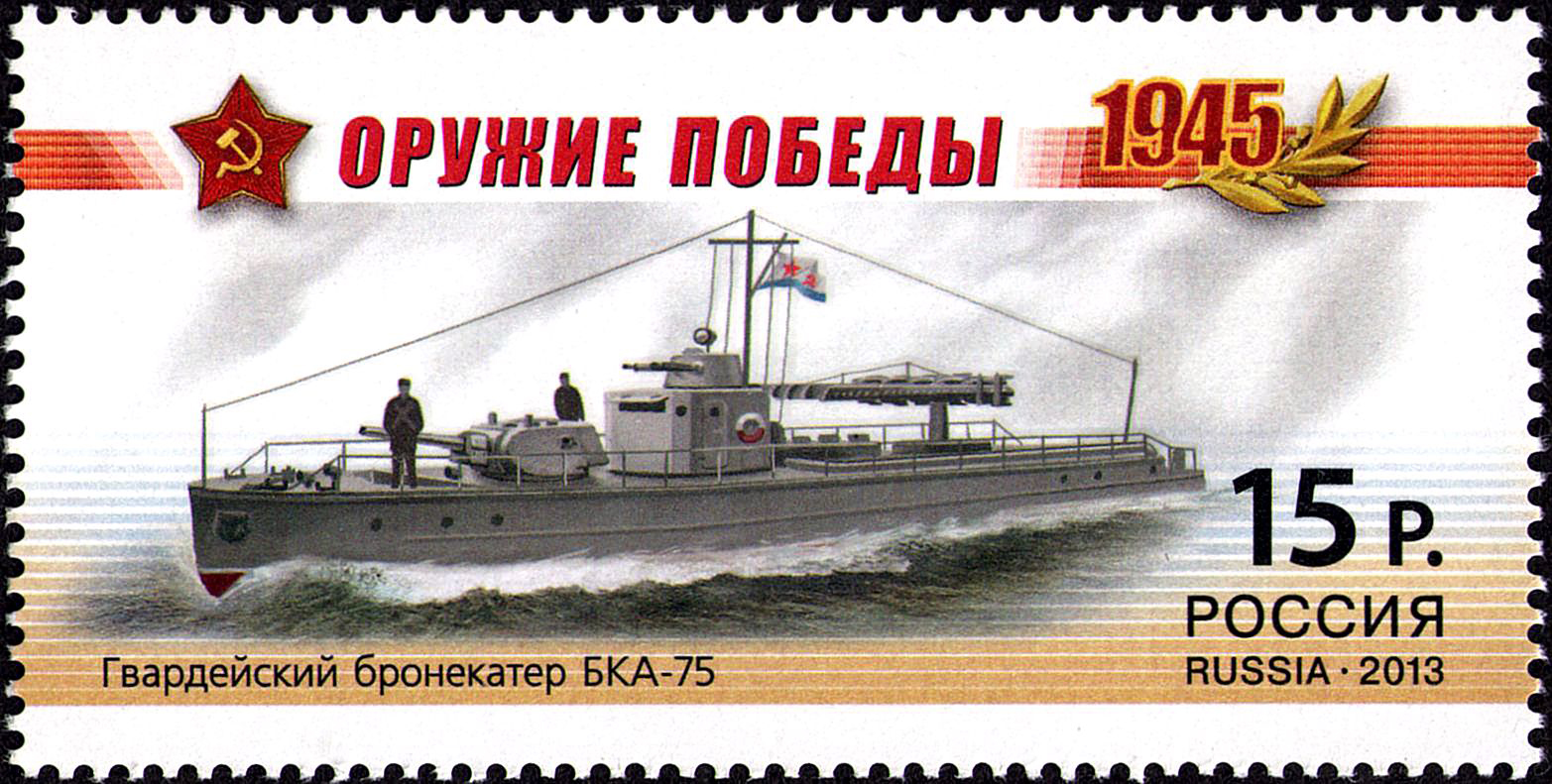
Soviet armored motor gunboat

=== Siege of Odessa ===
In support of the Romanian-led Siege of Odessa, the Romanian Navy dispatched motor torpedo boats to the recently occupied port of Ochakiv (Oceacov or Vozia in Romanian). Their mission was to harass Soviet communication and supply lines. During the night of 18 September 1941, the motor torpedo boats Viscolul and Vijelia attacked a Soviet convoy South of Odessa, each boat launching her two torpedoes at the closest enemy destroyer. Three of the four torpedoes missed. The fourth torpedo hit the Soviet destroyer, but failed to detonate.

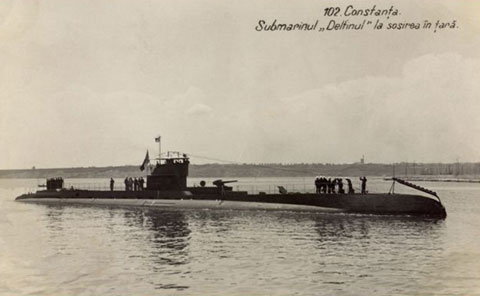
Romanian submarine Delfinul

=== Crimean Campaign ===
On 2 November 1941, in support of the German-Romanian troops advancing into the Crimea, the Romanian Navy sent its then-only submarine, Delfinul (also the only Axis submarine in the Black Sea until late 1942), to carry out a patrol off the Crimean coast. In the early hours of 6 November, the Romanian submarine Delfinul claimed the sinking of the Soviet 1,975-ton cargo ship Uralets four miles South of Yalta during only Romanian submarine torpedo-attack of the war, however the ship was sunk by Luftwaffe and the torpedo attack missed the minelayer Ostrovsky. The submarine was subsequently attacked by Soviet forces but she followed a route along the Turkish coast and managed to evade up to 80 depth charges, before safely arriving in the port of Constanța on 7 November.

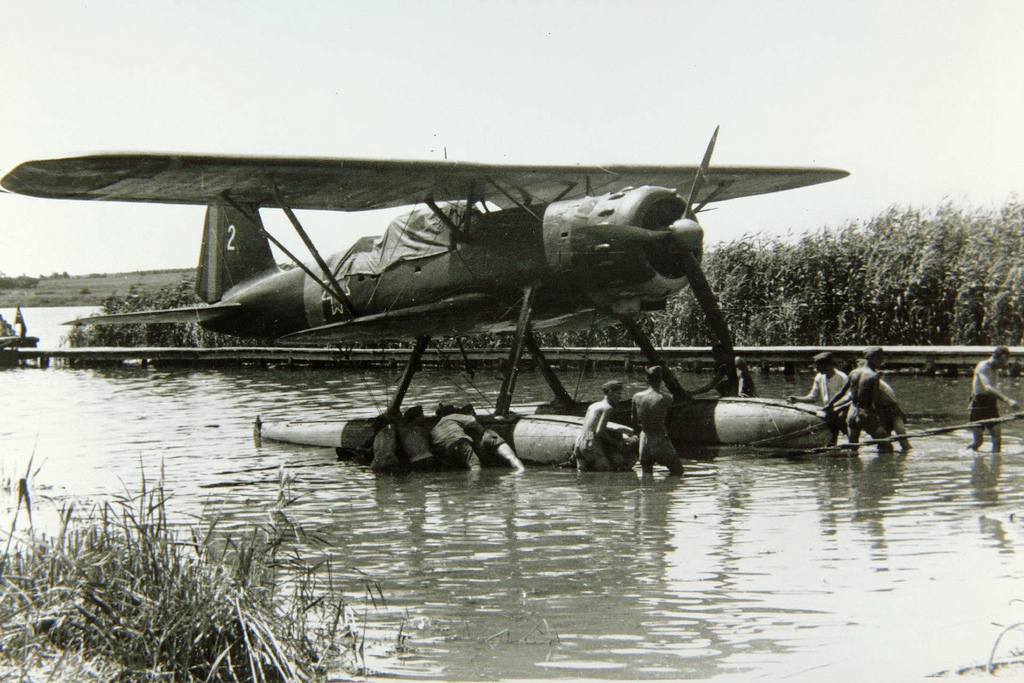
Romanian Heinkel He 114 floatplane

=== Romanian naval aviation ===
The most notable achievements of the Romanian Naval Aviation during World War II were the sinking of two Soviet submarines by a single Z.501 in August 1941, followed by the capture of a Soviet armed merchantman by a group of Heinkels in October. Romanian seaplanes monitored Soviet Navy locations and movements for the Luftwaffe bombers, which, with assistance from Escadrila 102, extirpated Soviet submarines from the Black Sea by late-autumn 1941.

A slight defeat came in the autumn of 1943, when a Z.501 was shot down by Soviet ace Grigoriy Rechkalov.

=== Conclusion ===
The Axis offensives into the Soviet Union were discontinued after Operation Uranus, which took place between 19 and 23 November 1942, during the Battle of Stalingrad. The Romanian naval units which directly supported the Axis offensives of 1941 and 1942 inflicted significantly more losses than they took in all engagements.

== The Royal Romanian Navy in 1943 ==
=== Fleet strength ===
The Romanian Naval Forces lost the anti-submarine gunboat Remus Lepri in 1941, during minelaying trials after she was converted to minelayer. The submarine Delfinul started an extensive refit at the end of 1942, which would keep her out of action for the remainder of the war. The modern Romanian-built submarines Rechinul and Marsuinul were completed in 1942 but could not begin their operations until 1944 and come too late to score results. In addition, five Italian-built CB-class midget submarines were temporarily acquired in the autumn of 1943, however only two could be made serviceable before being returned to the Italian R.S.I. naval forces. Seven 25-ton Italian MAS motor torpedo boats, each armed with two 350 mm torpedoes, were also acquired in 1943 without being used. These supplemented the existing squadron of seven motor torpedo boats, consisting of the British-built Viscolul and the six Romanian-built Vedenia-class vessels. Thus, by the end of 1943, the main operational warships of the Romanian Black Sea Fleet amounted to:

- 4 destroyers (two Regele Ferdinand-class and two Mărăști-class)
- 1 minelaying frigate (Amiral Murgescu)
- 4 operational submarines (Marsuinul, Rechinul and two CB-class)
- 5 sea-going ironclads (four Mihail Kogălniceanu-class and one Sava-class)
- 1 sea-going torpedo boat (Sborul)
- 3 anti-submarine corvettes (all Sublocotenent Ghiculescu-class)
- 2 anti-submarine corvettes (Smeul and Năluca)
- 14 motor torpedo boats (Viscolul, six Vedenia-class and seven MAS)
- 2 minelaying boats (both OMm35-class)
- 1 submarine tender (Constanța)

=== Territorial control ===
Throughout the war, numerous ports along the Western and Northern shores of the Black Sea were put under the protection of Romanian naval minefields. The following major seaports were protected by Romanian mine barrages by the end of 1943:

Port	Country	Date of Romanian mine laying
Constanţa	Romania	June 1941
Varna	Bulgaria	October 1941
Burgas	Bulgaria	October 1941
Odessa	Romania (de facto)	June 1942
Sevastopol	Nazi Germany (de facto)	September 1943

== Aftermath ==
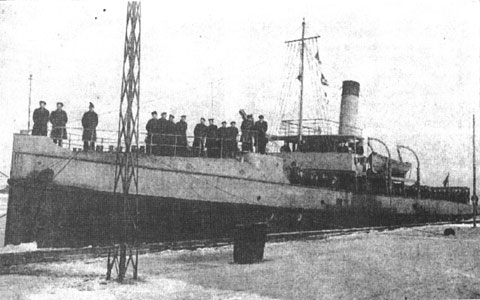
NMS Aurora

Romania capitulated on 23 August 1944, in the aftermath of a successful Soviet land offensive. On 20 August, the Soviet Air Force carried out a large air raid against Constanța, sinking the Romanian torpedo boat Năluca (she was converted to gunboat before the war). Also sunk by Soviet aircraft was the minelayer Aurora, on 15 July 1941, near Sulina. She was the only minelayer of the Romanian Navy that was purpose-built and not used for anything else (Amiral Murgescu was also employed as a destroyer escort). The old brig Mircea was also sunk during a Soviet air raid on 17 April 1944. Seven 25-ton Italian MAS motor torpedo boats, each armed with two 350 mm torpedoes, were also acquired in 1943.

Uniquely, in the Second World War, the Romanian Navy was the only navy to fight for over three years without losing a single unit of its main force of destroyers and submarines.

Starting September 1944, the Soviet Navy moved all Romanian warships to Caucasian ports. They were not returned until after the war. The older vessels were received in September 1945, while the more modern ones (such as the Regele Ferdinand-class) were kept by the Soviet Black Sea Fleet until the early 1950s. A number of warships (such as Amiral Murgescu) were never returned.

== See also ==
- Black Sea campaigns (1941–44)
- List of battles of the Romanian Navy
- List of World War II warship classes of the Royal Romanian Navy
- Soviet Black Sea Fleet during the Battle of Stalingrad
- Naval operations in Romanian-occupied Soviet waters
