= Black Sea campaigns (1941–1944) =

WWII operations

Black Sea Campaigns
- Part of the Eastern Front of World War II
Date	22 June 1941 – August 1944
Location	Black Sea
Result	Soviet victory

Belligerents
Romania; Germany; Italy (until 1943); Supported by; Hungary; Bulgaria; Croatia	Soviet Union

Commanders and leaders
(Kingdom of Romania) Horia Macellariu; (Nazi Germany) Helmut Rosenbaum; (Kingdom of Italy) Francesco Mimbelli	(Soviet Union) Filipp Oktyabrskiy; (Soviet Union) Lev Vladimirsky

Strength
(Kingdom of Romania) Romania; 4 destroyers 4 torpedo boats 3 minelayers 3 gunboats 1 submarine tender 1 training ship 8 submarines (Nazi Germany) Germany; 16 torpedo boats 6 submarines 49 ASW craft 100+ landing craft (Kingdom of Italy) Italy; 7+ torpedo boats 6 submarines (Tsardom of Bulgaria (1908–1946)) Bulgaria; 11 torpedo boats 5 ASW craft 14 landing craft (Independent State of Croatia) Croatia; 12 ASW craft	(Soviet Union) Soviet Union; 1 battleship 6 cruisers 19 destroyers 15 multi-purpose small ships 84 motor torpedo boats 44 submarines

The Black Sea Campaigns were the operations of the Axis and Soviet naval forces in the Black Sea and its coastal regions during World War II between 1941 and 1944, including in support of the land forces.

The Black Sea Fleet was as surprised by Operation Barbarossa as the rest of the Soviet military. The Axis forces in the Black Sea consisted of the Romanian and Bulgarian navies together with German and Italian units transported to the area via rail and canal. Although the Soviets enjoyed an overwhelming superiority in surface ships over the Axis, this was effectively negated by German air superiority and most of the Soviet ships sunk were destroyed by bombing. For the majority of the war, the Black Sea Fleet was commanded by Vice Admiral Filipp Oktyabrskiy, its other commander being Lev Vladimirsky.

The major Soviet shipyards were located in Ukraine (Nikolayev) and on the Crimean Peninsula, then part of the Russian Soviet Federative Socialist Republic, at Sevastopol. The former was occupied in 1941 but although the latter was not occupied until July 1942 (Siege of Sevastopol (1941–1942)) the rest of Crimea were also occupied in 1941 rendering the shipyards largely unusable. Many incomplete ships which were afloat were evacuated to harbours in Georgia which provided the main bases for the surviving fleet. These ports such as Poti, however had very limited repair facilities which significantly reduced the operational capability of the Soviet Fleet.

== Soviet naval strength ==
On 22 June 1941, the Black Sea Fleet of the Soviet Navy consisted of:

Ship Type	Number	Note/class
Battleship	1	Parizhskaya Kommuna
Cruisers	6	Molotov, Voroshilov, Chervona Ukraina, Krasnyi Krym, Krasny Kavkaz, and Komintern
Destroyer leaders	3	Kharkov, Moskva, and Tashkent
Destroyers (modern)	11	6 Type 7, 5 Type 7U,
Destroyers (old)	5	4 Fidonisy-class destroyer, 1 Derzky-class destroyer
Multi-purpose small ships	15	2 Uragan-class and 13 Fugas-class
Submarines	44	
Motor torpedo boats	84	

== Axis naval strength ==
=== Romanian Navy ===
Romanian naval forces in the Black Sea consisted of four destroyers, six torpedo boats, eight submarines, three minelayers, one submarine tender, three gunboats and one training ship.

Vessel	Origin	Type	Notes
Destroyers
Mărăști	Italy	Destroyer	Built in Italy for the Romanian Navy, entered service in 1920
Mărășești	Italy	Destroyer	Built in Italy for the Romanian Navy, entered service in 1920
Regele Ferdinand	Italy	Destroyer	Built in Italy for the Romanian Navy, entered service in 1930
Regina Maria	Italy	Destroyer	Built in Italy for the Romanian Navy, entered service in 1930
Torpedo boats
Năluca	Austria-Hungary	Torpedo boat	Built in Austria-Hungary during World War I
Sborul	Austria-Hungary	Torpedo boat	Built in Austria-Hungary during World War I
Smeul	Austria-Hungary	Torpedo boat	Built in Austria-Hungary during World War I
Viscolul	United Kingdom	Motor torpedo boat	Built in the United Kingdom, acquired in 1940
Viforul	United Kingdom	Motor torpedo boat	Built in the United Kingdom, acquired in 1940
Vijelia	United Kingdom	Motor torpedo boat	Built in the United Kingdom, acquired in 1940
Minelayers
Regele Carol I	United Kingdom	Minelayer/Seaplane tender	Built in the United Kingdom in 1898
Amiral Murgescu	Romania	Minelayer/Escort ship	Built at the Galați shipyard in Romania between 1938 and 1941
Submarine tenders
Constanța	Italy	Submarine tender	Built in Italy for the Romanian Navy between 1927 and 1931
Gunboats
Sublocotenent Ghiculescu	France	Gunboat	Built in France during the second half of World War I
Eugen Stihi	France	Gunboat	Built in France during the second half of World War I
Căpitan Dumitrescu	France	Gunboat	Built in France during the second half of World War I
Training ships
Mircea	Germany	Training ship	Built in Germany for the Romanian Navy in 1938
Submarines
Delfinul	Italy	Submarine	Built in Italy for the Romanian Navy, entered service in 1936
Rechinul	Romania	Submarine	Built at the Galați shipyard in Romania between 1938 and 1943
Marsuinul	Romania	Submarine	Built at the Galați shipyard in Romania between 1938 and 1943
CB-1	Italy	Midget submarine	Acquired in late 1943 after the Italian surrender
CB-2	Italy	Midget submarine	Acquired in late 1943 after the Italian surrender
CB-3	Italy	Midget submarine	Acquired in late 1943 after the Italian surrender
CB-4	Italy	Midget submarine	Acquired in late 1943 after the Italian surrender
CB-6	Italy	Midget submarine	Acquired in late 1943 after the Italian surrender

=== Germany ===
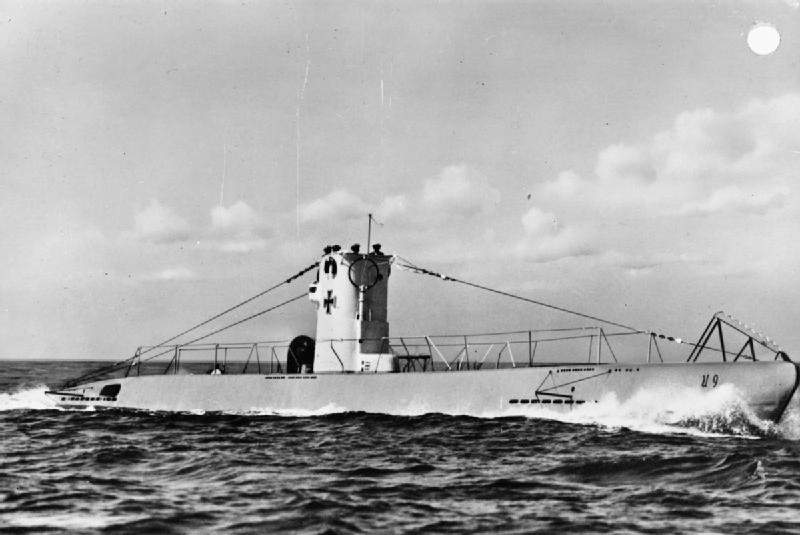
German Type IIB submarine U-9, re-assembled for the Kriegsmarine at the Galați shipyard

As Turkey was neutral during World War II, the Axis could not transfer warships to the Black Sea via the Bosphorus. The Montreux Convention, signed only a few years earlier, allowed Turkey to close the straits to all military traffic. Hitler offered to sell Turkey a few submarines so they could legally gain passage to the Black Sea, in a way not too different than the scheme successfully employed to pull Turkey into WWI. Turkey refused. However, several small ships were transferred from the North Sea via rail, street and canal networks to the Danube. These included six Type IIB U-boats of the 30th U-boat Flotilla which were disassembled and shipped to Romania along the Danube. They were then re-assembled at the Romanian Galați shipyard in late 1942 and afterwards sent to Constanța. The Germans also transported 10 S-boats (Schnellboote) and 23 R-boats (Räumboote) via the Danube and built armed barges and KTs (Kriegstransporter, literally war transports) in the captured Nikolayev Shipyards in Nikolayev. Some ships were obtained in Romania, Bulgaria and Hungary, and then converted to serve the German cause, such as the S-boat tender Romania, the minelayer Xanten and the anti-submarine trawler UJ-115 Rosita. Additional vessels were built in German or local shipyards, captured from Soviets, or transferred from the Mediterranean nominally as merchant ships. In total, the German naval forces in the Black Sea mainly amounted to 6 coastal submarines, 16 S-boats, 23 R-boats, 26 submarine chasers and over 100 MFP barges. The German Black Sea fleet ultimately operated hundreds of medium and small warships or auxiliaries before its self-destruction immediately prior to the defection of Bulgaria. Very few vessels were able to make good their escape via the Danube.

=== Bulgaria, Italy and Hungary ===
Despite Bulgaria's neutral status in the German-Soviet war, the Bulgarian navy was involved in escort duties to protect Axis shipping against Soviet submarines in Bulgarian territorial waters. The small Bulgarian Navy mainly consisted of 4 old torpedo boats, 3 modern German-built motor torpedo boats, 4 Dutch-built motor torpedo boats of the Power type, 2 SC-1 class submarine chasers and 3 anti-submarine motor launches. In late August 1944, 14 MFP landing barges were transferred to Bulgaria.

At Germany's request, the Italian Navy dispatched a small force to the Black Sea. This was "the only time that the Germans ever spontaneously requested the assistance of the Italian Armed Forces on any German war front." The force dispatched included six MAS boats, six (originally four) CB class midget submarines and four torpedo motorboats.

Hungary became landlocked in the aftermath of World War I, but some Hungarian merchant ships were able to reach the Black Sea via the Danube River. Hungarian cargo ships were operated as part of Axis sea transport forces on the Black Sea, and thus participated in the Axis evacuation from Crimea.

=== Croatian Naval Legion ===
The Croatian Naval Legion was formed in July 1941. It initially comprised some 350 officers and ratings in German uniform, but this eventually swelled to 900–1,000. Their first commander was Andro Vrkljan, later replaced by Stjepan Rumenović. The Croats' purpose in posting a naval contingent to the Black Sea was to evade the prohibition on an Adriatic navy imposed by the 18 May 1941 Treaties of Rome with Italy, which effectively limited the Croatian Navy (RMNDH) to a riverine flotilla. Upon its arrival at the Sea of Azov, the Legion scrounged up 47 damaged or abandoned fishing vessels, mostly sailing ships, and hired local Russian and Ukrainian sailors (many of them deserters from the Soviet Navy) to man them. The Legion later acquired 12 German submarine hunters and a battery of coastal artillery. Lieutenant Josip Mažuranić notably commanded the submarine hunter UJ2303.

== Operations in 1941 ==
On 26 June the Soviet forces attacked the Romanian city of Constanța. During this operation, the destroyer leader Moskva was lost to mines while evading fire from Axis coastal batteries and destroyers. The Black Sea Fleet supplied the besieged garrison in Odessa and evacuated a significant part of the force (86,000 soldiers, 150,000 civilians) at the end of October, but lost the destroyer Frunze and a gunboat to the German dive bombers in the process. Soviet hospital ship Armenia was sunk by German aviation on 7 November, resulting in over 5000 deaths, most of them civilian and patients being evacuated.

The Black Sea Fleet played a valuable part in defeating the initial assault on Sevastopol. In December, there was an amphibious operation against Kerch which resulted in the recapture of the Kerch Peninsula. A naval detachment including the cruiser Krasnyi Krym remained in Sevastopol to give gunfire support. Soviet submarines also raided Axis shipping on the Romanian and Bulgarian coasts, sinking 29,000 long tons (29,000 t) of shipping. During fall of 1941, both sides laid many mine fields in southern Black Sea: Romanian defensive minefields sunk at least 5 Soviet submarines during this period (M-58, S-34, ShCh-211, M-34, M-59), however during such operations the Axis forces lost the Romanian minelayer Regele Carol I, sunk by a mine laid by Soviet submarine L-4: 2 of the 5 Soviet submarines (M-58 and ShCh-211) will be later sunk on that same minelayer's fields, after the sinking of the ship, in addition to another submarine sunk in 1942. In total, up to 15 Soviet submarines were sunk by Romanian defensive minefields until the end of the War. Another Romanian minelayer was lost, the Aurora, when the ship was destroyed by Soviet bombers on 15 July.

== Operations in 1942 ==
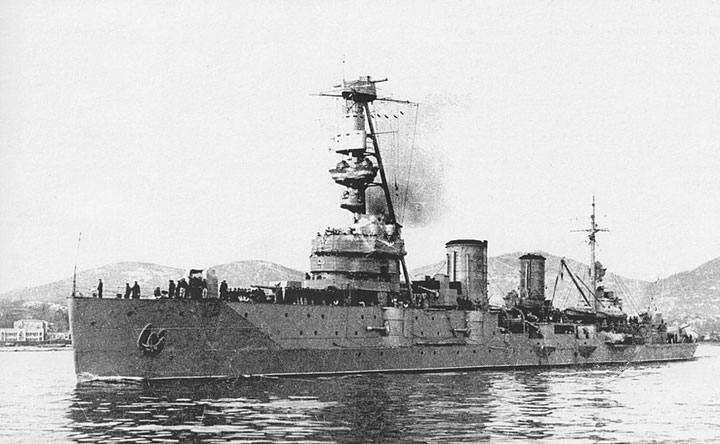
Soviet cruiser Krasnyi Krym took part in defending against the Siege of Sevastopol

Operations in 1942 were dominated by the Siege of Sevastopol. During the winter, Soviet warships including the only battleship Parizhskaya Kommuna provided fire support and supply missions near Sevastopol. The Soviets continued supply missions until 27 June, losses were heavy and included the cruiser Chervonnaya Ukraina, destroyer leader Tashkent (built in Italy for the USSR) and six modern destroyers.

The cruiser Voroshilov and destroyers tried to intervene without success in the Battle of the Kerch Peninsula in May and the Soviets could not prevent a landing across the Kerch strait in the Taman Peninsula in September. The remainder of the Black Sea Fleet evacuated to ports in the Caucasus that had very limited facilities. Soviet submarines were active in the western part of the Black Sea where they attacked Axis shipping. Unfortunately this included sinking the refugee ship Struma sailing under a Red Cross flag, International Red Cross and the USSR were informed before departure, the ship was torpedoed while being towed. On 1 October the Soviet submarine M-118 was sunk with depth charges by the Romanian gunboat Sublocotenent Ghiculescu.

== Operations in 1943 ==
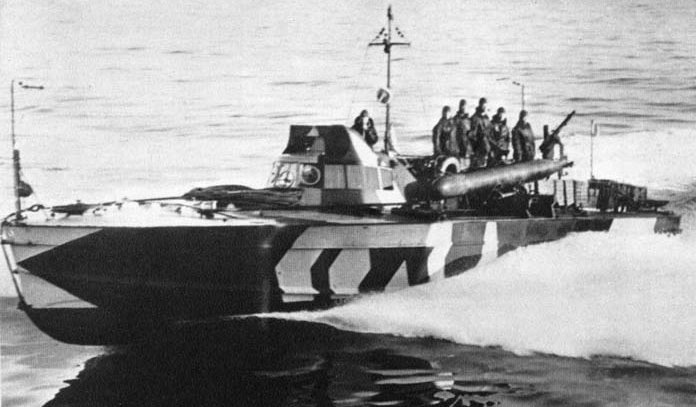
Italian MAS torpedo boat

In 1943, the Black Sea Fleet was reduced to the following ships, which all suffered from poor maintenance due to a lack of facilities:

- Battleship Sevastopol
- Four cruisers (two Kirov class - Molotov and Voroshilov -, Krasniy Krim and Krasniy Kavkaz)
- Destroyer leader Kharkov
- Five modern and three old destroyers
- 29 submarines

The Romanian Naval Forces lost the anti-submarine gunboat Remus Lepri in 1941, during minelaying trials after she was converted to minelayer. The submarine Delfinul started an extensive refit at the end of 1942, which would keep her out of action for the remainder of the war. Despite these losses, the Romanian Navy reached its peak strength in 1943. The modern Romanian-built submarines Rechinul and Marsuinul were completed in 1942. In addition, five Italian-built CB-class midget submarines were acquired in the autumn of 1943, however only two could be made serviceable. Four modified M-class minesweepers, armed as anti-submarine frigates, were built in Romania from German materials during the year. Thus, the main operational warships of the Romanian Black Sea Fleet amounted to:

- 4 destroyers (two Regele Ferdinand-class and two Mărăști-class)
- 1 sea-going torpedo boat (Sborul)
- 10 anti-submarine frigates (Amiral Murgescu, four Mihail Kogălniceanu-class, one Sava-class and the four M-class minesweepers)
- 5 anti-submarine corvettes (three Sublocotenent Ghiculescu-class and two Smeul-class)
- 4 submarines (Marsuinul, Rechinul and two CB-class midget submarines)

Operations initially consisted of several offensive operations by the Soviets including the defence of Malaya Zemlya in Novorossiysk and some coastal bombardments and raids. On 7 July, the Romanian destroyer Mărășești sank the Soviet submarine M-31. As the war was going badly for the Axis on other fronts, the Germans began to evacuate the Kuban bridgehead in September. This was successfully accomplished. Kharkov and two destroyers—Sposobny and Besposchadny—were sunk by Stukas while raiding the Crimea. As a result of this loss, Stalin insisted on personally authorizing the use of any large ships. The Kerch-Eltigen Operation followed in November.

== Operations in 1944 ==
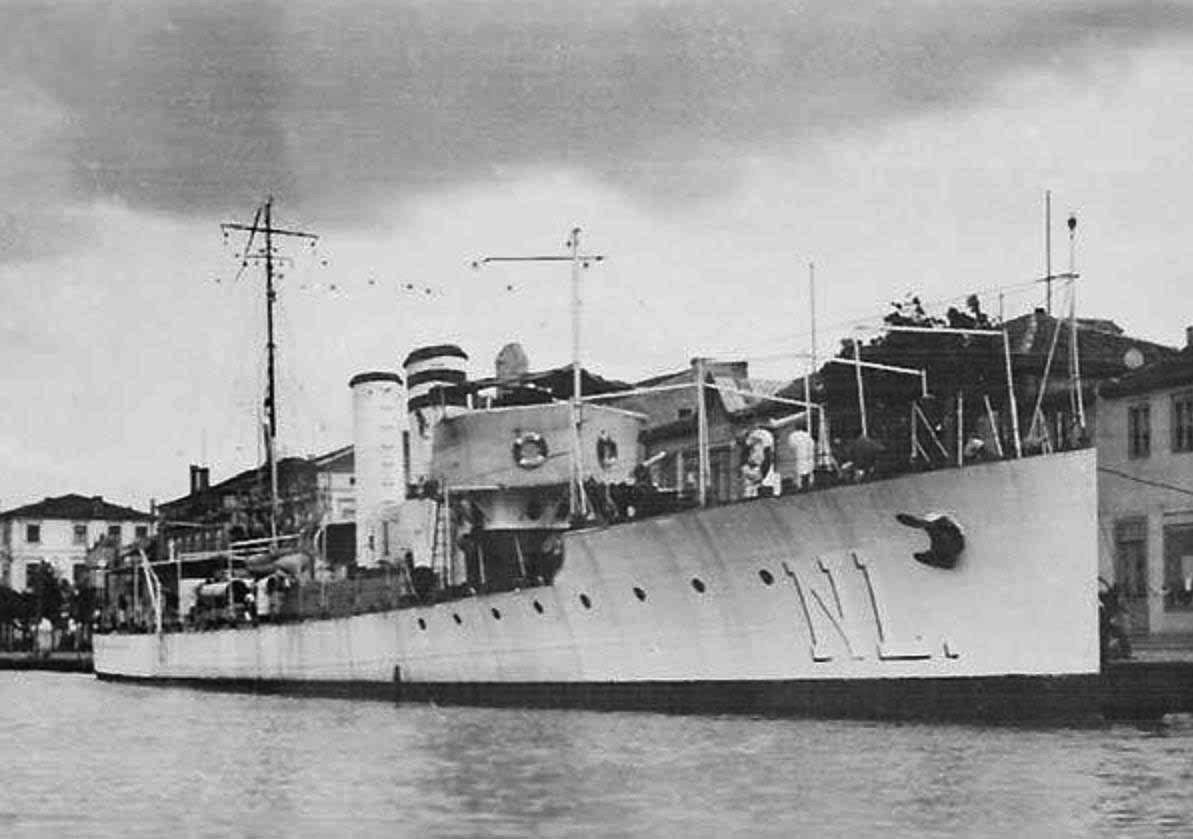
Romanian torpedo boat Năluca, sunk by Soviet aircraft on 20 August 1944

By early 1944, the Soviet surface fleet was practically nonoperational due to a poor state of repair. Most of the offensive work was carried out by small vessels and the Soviet Naval air force. The land situation had significantly deteriorated for the Axis. The area around Odessa was liberated in March, trapping the Axis forces in the Crimea. The last Axis forces near Sevastopol surrendered on 9 May 1944 and a considerable number of men were evacuated. (See Battle of the Crimea (1944) for details). Soviet submarines continued to attack Axis shipping. Unbeknownst to them, one of the ships attacked was the MV Mefküre transporting Jewish refugees from Europe.

On 20 August 1944, the Red Air Force carried out a large air raid against the main Axis base in Black Sea. A number of targets were sunk including the German U-boat U-9, and the old Romanian torpedo boat Naluca (converted to anti-submarine corvette before the start of the war). U-18 and U-24 were both damaged and were ultimately scuttled a few days later. The Naval war in the Black Sea was now almost over, but U-boats remained operative in the theater until they consumed their fuel: with a single strike, Soviet aviation had halved the German submarine force, but the effect could have been greater if such an attack had been carried out earlier.

== See also ==
- Baltic Sea Campaigns (1939–1945)
- Romanian Navy during World War II
- List of battles of the Romanian Navy
- Soviet Black Sea Fleet during the Battle of Stalingrad
- Naval operations in Romanian-occupied Soviet waters

== Bibliography ==
- Ruge, Fredrich - The Soviets as Naval Opponents, 1941-1975 (1979), Naval Press Annapolis ISBN 9780870216763
