= Naval operations in Romanian-occupied Soviet waters =

- Part of the Black Sea campaigns (1941–1944)
- Territories acquired by Romania during Operation Barbarossa
Date	November 1941 – April 1944
Location	Western Black Sea
Result	Axis defeat: Virtually all disputed coastline recovered by Soviet ground forces as of 23 August 1944

Belligerents
Romania; Germany; Hungary; Bulgaria	Soviet Union

Commanders and leaders
Horia Macellariu	(Soviet Union) Filipp Oktyabrskiy

Strength
Military vessels: 3 destroyers 5 gunboats 2 minelayers 2 motor torpedo boats	Military vessels: 6 submarines 2 motor gunboats

Casualties and losses
Military vessels: 2 motor torpedo boats	Military vessels: 4 submarines sunk 2 submarines damaged 2 motor gunboats sunk

Between 1941 and 1944, Romania held control over much of the Black Sea coast in modern Ukraine east of Crimea. This was acquired during Operation Barbarossa. The Romanian capture of the Soviet-controlled western Black Sea coast started in July 1941 during Operation München and ended in October that year, after the Siege of Odessa. In the aftermath of these actions, Romania acquired two sectors of coastline: the Bessarabian coast, which had been part of Romanian waters prior to the Soviet occupation of Bessarabia and Northern Bukovina; and the Transnistrian Coast. The latter was lost in April 1944, but the former was successfully defended until August 1944.

== Actions in Bessarabian waters ==
On 17 December 1941, the Soviet M-class submarine M-59 carried out an attack against an Axis convoy near the coastal town of Jibrieni in December 1941. The convoy consisted of the Hungarian cargo ships Kassa and Kolozsvár and the Bulgarian cargo ship Tzar Ferdinand. The three ships were escorted by the Romanian destroyers Regele Ferdinand and Regina Maria, the Romanian gunboats Stihi and Ghiculescu and the Romanian torpedo boats Sborul and Smeul. The two torpedoes launched by the Soviet submarine missed the aft and bow respectively of the Romanian destroyer by about 30 feet each. With 25 knots, Regele Ferdinand rushed to the place the torpedoes were launched from and dropped three series of depth charges. Between the second and third series, fuel and bubbles emerged from the water. Regele Ferdinand subsequently circled the area and dropped four more depth charges, followed by more fuel emerging from the depths as well as pieces of wood. Regele Ferdinand reported the sinking of the submarine, which was confirmed by the Romanian Naval Command. Post-war sources revealed the identity of the submarine as M-59.

On 1 October 1942, near the Burnas Lagoon, the Soviet M-class submarine M-118 attacked and sank the German transport ship Salzburg. After attacking, the submarine was located by a German BV 138C flying boat, and the Romanian gunboats Sublocotenent Ghiculescu and Stihi Eugen were sent to the scene. The two Romanian warships attacked the submarine with depth charges, sinking her with all hands.

On 14 October 1942, the Soviet submarine M-32 unsuccessfully attacked the Romanian destroyer Regele Ferdinand near the Burnas Lagoon, the submarine being subsequently depth charged and damaged by the Romanian torpedo boat Smeul.

== Actions in Transnistrian waters ==
On 9 November 1941, the Romanian motor torpedo boats Viforul and Vijelia were sunk near Odessa by Soviet mines.

On 13 June 1942, the Soviet submarine A-5 was damaged by Romanian depth charges near Odessa.

On 24 June 1942, the Romanian minelayer Amiral Murgescu along with one auxiliary minelayer laid mines off Odessa, while being escorted by the Romanian destroyers Regele Ferdinand and Regina Maria, the Romanian flotilla leader Mărășești, the Romanian gunboats Ghiculescu, Stihi and Dumitrescu and the Romanian gunboat Smeul (ex-torpedo boat), as well as German motor minesweepers of the Donau Flotilla. The mines laid near Odessa later sank the M-class submarines M-33 and M-60 on 24 August and 26 September that year.

Also sunk by the Romanian-laid mines near Odessa were the motor gunboats YA-26 and YA-27 on 18 April 1944, a few days after Transnistria was re-captured by Soviet forces.

== Gallery ==
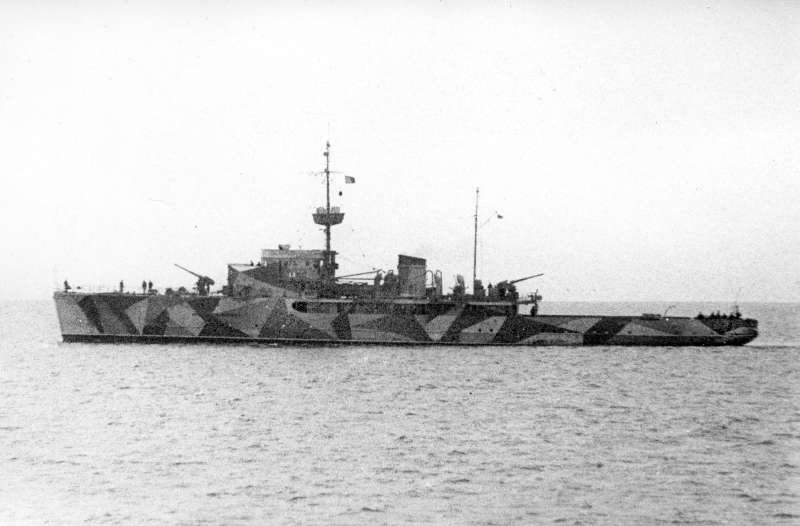
The Romanian minelayer Amiral Murgescu

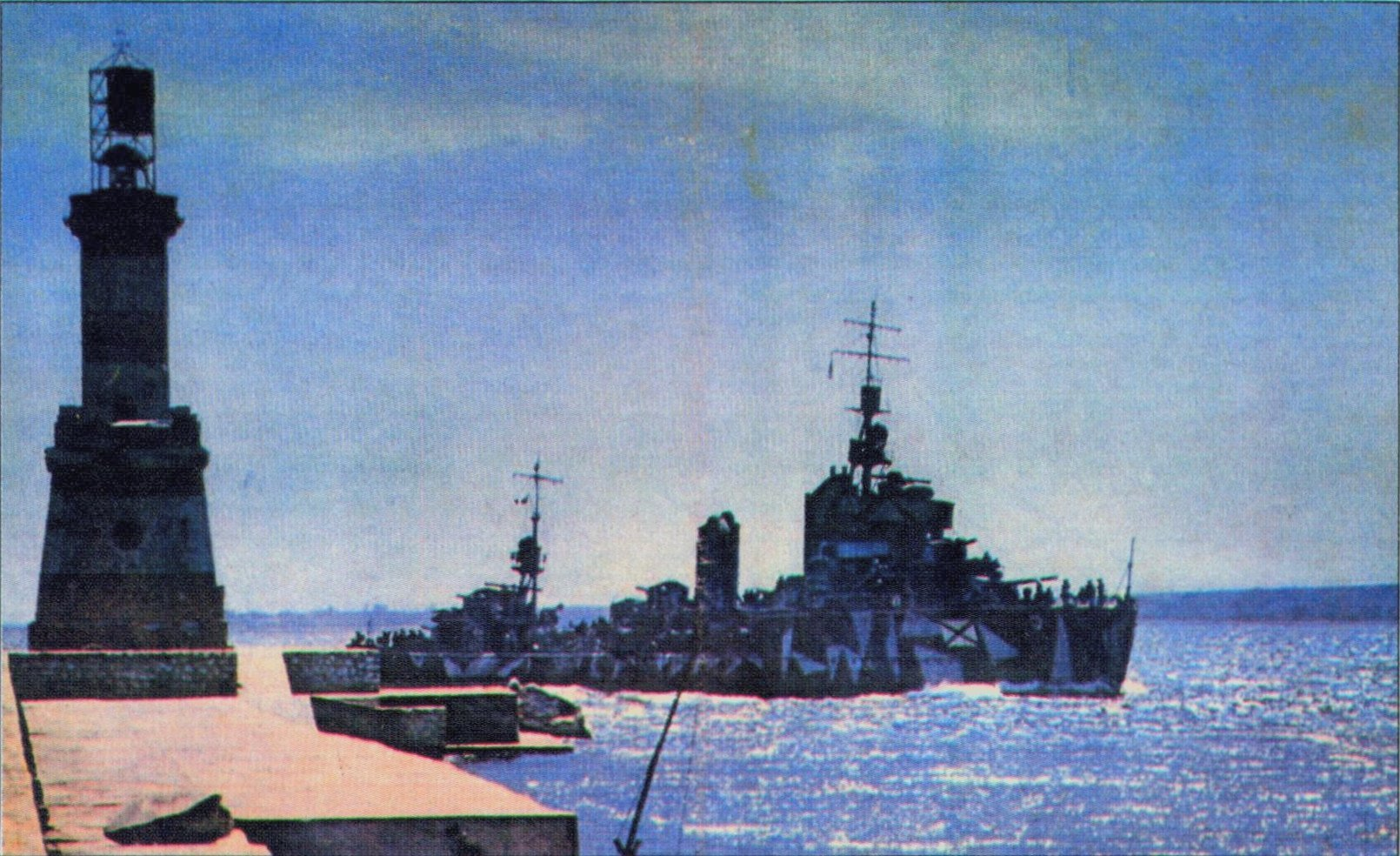
The Romanian destroyer Regele Ferdinand

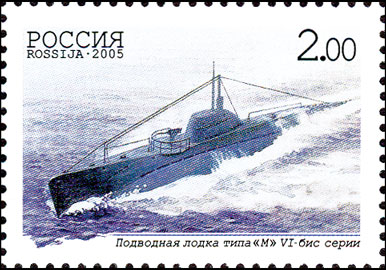
Soviet M-class submarine

The Romanian front in August 1944
