= Operation München =

1941 German-Romanian offensive of Operation Barbarossa

- Part of Operation Barbarossa of the Eastern Front of World War II
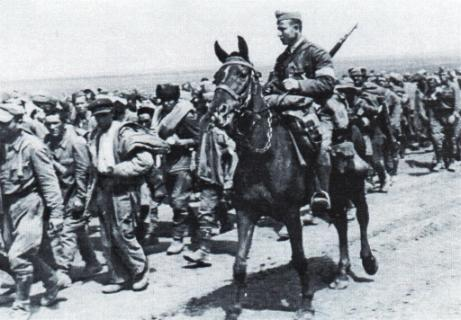
- Romanian cavalryman escorting Soviet prisoners
Date	2–26 July 1941
Location	Bessarabia, Northern Bukovina, Hertsa region
Result	Axis victory

Belligerents
Soviet Union	Romania (Nazi Germany) Germany

Commanders and leaders
(Soviet Union) Ivan Tyulenev (Soviet Union) Yakov Cherevichenko (Soviet Union) Andrey Smirnov (Soviet Union) Filipp Oktyabrsky	(Kingdom of Romania) Ion Antonescu (Kingdom of Romania) Petre Dumitrescu (Kingdom of Romania) Nicolae Ciupercă (Nazi Germany) Eugen von Schobert (Kingdom of Romania) Horia Macellariu

Units involved
Odessa Military District: (Soviet Union) 9th Army (Soviet Union) 12th Army (Soviet Union) 18th Army	Army Group Antonescu: (Kingdom of Romania) 3rd Army; (Kingdom of Romania) 4th Army; (Nazi Germany) 11th Army

Strength
(Soviet Union) 364,700 troops 700 tanks 1,750 aircraft 5 river monitors 22 armored motor gunboats	(Kingdom of Romania) 325,685 troops 201 tanks 672 aircraft 1 monitor 6 river monitors 4+ armed boats (Nazi Germany) 5 divisions, 420 aircraft

Casualties and losses
Total: 17,893; 8,519 killed/missing 9,374 wounded 255 aircraft 2 river monitors damaged 7 armored motor gunboats sunk	(Kingdom of Romania) Total: 21,738; 4,112 killed, 12,120 wounded, 5,506 missing 58 aircraft

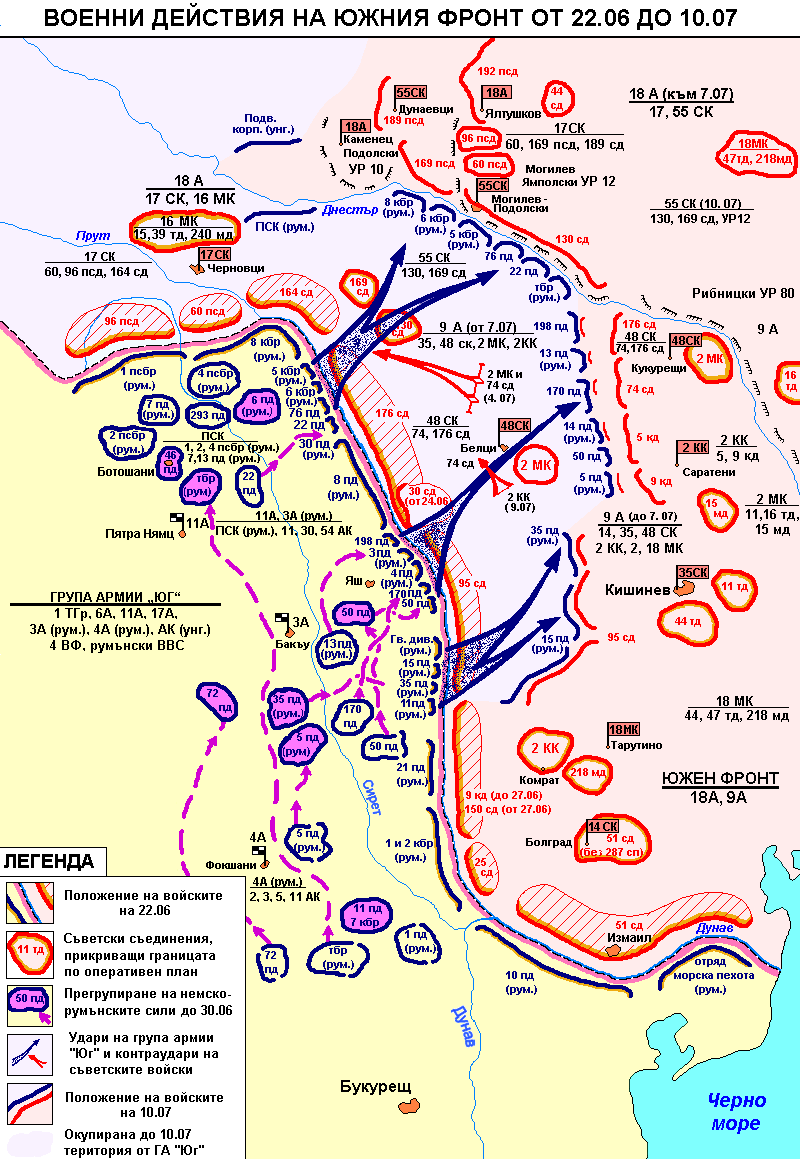
Operation München

Operation München (Romanian: Operațiunea München; German: Unternehmen München; Russian: Операция Мюнхен, romanized: Operatsiya Myunkhen) was the Romanian codename of a joint German-Romanian offensive during the German invasion of the Soviet Union in World War II, with the primary objective of recapturing Bessarabia, Northern Bukovina and the Hertsa region, ceded by Romania to the Soviet Union a year before (Soviet occupation of Bessarabia and Northern Bukovina). The operation started during the night of 2–3 July 1941 and concluded successfully after 24 days of fighting. Axis formations involved included the Romanian Third Army (under the command of Petre Dumitrescu) in the north; the German Eleventh Army and subordinated Romanian units (under the command of Eugen Ritter von Schobert) in the center; and the Romanian Fourth Army (under the command of Nicolae Ciupercă) in the south. The invasion was followed by a genocide against the Jewish population of Bessarabia.

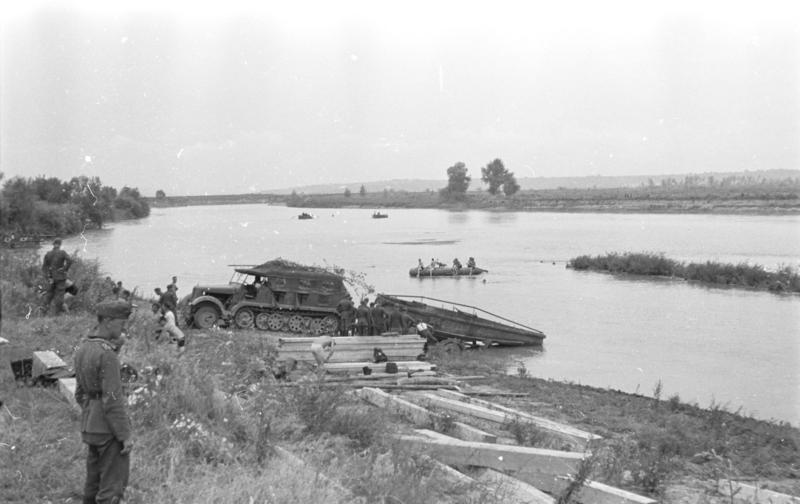
Units of the German 11th Army building a pontoon bridge across the Prut River during the advance towards Uman

The offensive started on 2 July, with Romanian forces striking north. On 5 July, Cernăuți, the capital of Northern Bukovina, was seized by the 3rd and 23rd Vânători de Munte Battalions. On 16 July, Chișinău, the Bessarabian capital, was seized after heavy fighting by Romanian forces spearheaded by the 1st Romanian Armored Division (Divizia 1 Blindată), equipped mainly with 126 R-2 light tanks. By 26 July, the entire region was under Romanian-German control. On 17 August, Bessarabia and Northern Bukovina were formally re-integrated into the Romanian state.

== Order of Battle ==
=== Axis forces ===
Mareșal Ion Antonescu

- Romanian Third Army – Lieutenant General Petre Dumitrescu
  - Mountain Corps – Major General Gheorghe Avramescu
    - 1st Mountain Brigade – Brigadier General Mihail Lascăr
    - 2nd Mountain Brigade – Brigadier General Ioan Dumitrache
    - 4th Mountain Brigade – Brigadier General Gheorghe Manoliu
    - 7th Infantry Division – Brigadier General Olimpiu Stavrat
  - Cavalry Corps – Major General Ioan Mihail Racoviță
    - 6th Infantry Division – Brigadier General Romulus Ioanovici
      - 15th Războieni Regiment
    - 5th Cavalry Brigade – Colonel Vasile Măinescu
      - 6th Motorized Roșiori Regiment – Colonel Radu Korne
    - 6th Cavalry Brigade – Major General Aurel Racovitză
    - 8th Cavalry Brigade – Colonel Ioan Dănescu
  - 4th Army Corps – Major General Constantin Sănătescu
    - 13th Infantry Division – Brigadier General Gheorghe Rozin
    - 14th Infantry Division – Brigadier General Gheorghe Stavrescu
- German 11th Army – Colonel General Eugen Ritter von Schobert
  - XI Army Corps – General of the Infantry Joachim von Kortzfleisch
    - 22nd Infantry Division – Lieutenant General Hans Graf von Sponeck
    - 46th Infantry Division – Lieutenant General Karl Kriebel
    - 239th Infantry Division – Lieutenant General Ferdinand Neuling
  - XXX Army Corps – General of the Infantry Hans von Salmuth
    - 76th Infantry Division – Lieutenant General Carl Rodenburg
    - 198th Infantry Division – Lieutenant General Otto Röttig
  - LIV Army Corps – General of the Cavalry Erick-Oskar Hansen
    - 50th Infantry Division – Lieutenant General Karl-Adolf Hollidt
    - 170th Infantry Division – Lieutenant General Walter Wittke
  - Romanian 1st Armored Division – Brigadier General Ioan Sion
- Romanian Fourth Army – Lieutenant General Nicolae Ciupercă
  - 3rd Army Corps – Major General Vasile Atanasiu
    - 15th Infantry Division – Major General Cosma Marin Popescu
      - 23rd Artillery Regiment – Colonel Alexandru Ianculovici
      - 25th Artillery Regiment – Colonel Petre Romano
    - 35th Reserve Division – Brigadier General Emil Procopiescu
  - 5th Army Corps – Major General Aurelian Son
    - Guards Division – Major General Nicolae Șova
    - 21st Infantry Division – Major General Nicolae Dăscălescu
      - 5th Artillery Regiment – Colonel Vasile Mihăilescu
      - 30th Artillery Regiment – Colonel Constantin Rosetti-Bălănescu
  - 11 Army Corps – Major General Constantin Constantinescu-Claps
    - 4th Infantry Division – Brigadier General Gheorghe Cialâk
    - 1st Fortress Brigade
    - 2nd Fortress Brigade
  - Reserve: 5th Infantry Division – Brigadier General Petre Vlădescu
    - 7th Artillery Regiment – Colonel Alexandru Nicolici
    - 28th Artillery Regiment – Colonel Alexandru Otopeanu
  - 2nd Army Corps – General Nicolae Macici
    - 9th Division – Brigadier General Hugo Schwab
    - 10th Division – Brigadier General Ioan Glogojeanu

=== Soviet forces ===
Southern Front – General Colonel Ivan Tyulenev

- 18th Army – Lieutenant General Andrey Smirnov
  - 17th Rifle Corps – Major General Ivan Galanin
    - 60th Mountain Rifle Division – Major General M.B. Salikhov
    - 96th Mountain Division – Major General Ivan Shepetov
    - 164th Rifle Division – Colonel A.N. Chervinskii
  - 16th Mechanized Corps – Major General A. D. Sokolov
    - 15th Tank Division
    - 39th Tank Division
    - 240th Motorized Division
  - 55th Rifle Corps – Major General Konstantin Koroteyev
    - 130th Rifle Division
    - 169th Rifle Division – Major General Ivan Turunov
    - 189th Rifle Division
- 9th Army – Lieutenant General Yakov Cherevichenko
  - 35th Rifle Corps – Major General Ivan Dashichev
    - 30th Mountain Division
    - 95th Rifle Division – Major General A.I. Pastrevich
    - 176th Rifle Division – Major General V.M. Martsinkevich
  - 48th Rifle Corps – Major General Rodion Malinovsky
    - 74th Rifle Division – Colonel F.Ye. Sheverdin
    - 116th Rifle Division – Colonel Ya.F. Eremenko
    - 150th Rifle Division – Major General I.I. Khorun
  - 2nd Mechanized Corps – Major General Yury Novoselsky
    - 11th Tank Division – Colonel G.I. Kuzmin
    - 16th Tank Division – Colonel Col. M.I. Mindro
    - 15th Motorized Division – Major General Nikolay Belov
  - 18th Mechanized Corps – Major General P.V. Volokh
    - 44th Tank Division – Colonel V.P. Krimov
    - 47th Tank Division – Colonel Georgy Rodin
    - 218th Motor Rifle Division – Major General F.N. Shilov
  - 2nd Cavalry Corps – Major General Pavel Belov
    - 5th Cavalry Division – Colonel Viktor Kirillovich Baranov
    - 9th Cavalry Division – Colonel A.F. Bychkovsky
  - 14th Rifle Corps – Major General Daniil Yegorov
    - 25th Rifle Division – Colonel A.S. Zakharchenko
    - 51st Rifle Division – Major General P.G. Tsirulnikov
  - Danube Flotilla – Rear Admiral Nikolai Osipovich Abramov

== Fighting in Southern Bessarabia ==
The combat operations in Southern Bessarabia were some of the most complex in the entire operation, involving artillery, warships, aviation, soldiers and marines from both sides. The Soviet Danube Flotilla consisted of 5 river monitors, 22 armed and armored motor boats and 7 minesweeping boats. The Romanian Danube Flotilla had 7 river monitors, but fewer, about 4, small armed small boats. Fighting in this sector of the front started days before the operation, with a first skirmish between Soviet and Romanian warships on 23 June, when the Soviet vessels attempted to break the Romanian naval blockade. During the night of 9/10 July, the Soviet warships took advantage of the reduced visibility and managed to sneak out of the blockade. On 26 June, in support of the sea-borne Raid on Constanța, Soviet armored motor gunboats landed troops at Chilia Veche and captured most of the Romanian 15th Marine Infantry Battalion, Romanian losses amounting to 468 troops. The remnants of the battalion, supported by one armed boat and two motorboats, managed to defend Stipoc Island against further Soviet attacks. The Romanian 17th Marine Infantry Battalion managed to hold the Periprava sector all throughout the Operation and the preceding days, repelling numerous Soviet attacks. During this time, its artillery also sank four Soviet armored boats. On the night of 22–23 July, the battalion recaptured Tatarbunar. Ultimately, the losses of the Soviet Danube Flotilla amounted to two river monitors damaged, five armored motor boats sunk and one more damaged. On 18–19 July, the Flotilla withdrew from the Danube Delta. Thus, on 22 July, Romania recaptured Reni, Ismail, Chilia Nouă and Vâlcov.

== Naval engagements ==
The Romanian naval formation involved in the operation, the Tulcea Tactical Group, fought several naval engagements against the Soviet Navy. These battles resulted in the damaging of two Soviet monitors and two armored motor gunboats, as well as the sinking of another armored motor gunboat. The two damaged Soviet gunboats were the result of an action preceding the operation by several days.

=== Action of 13 July ===
On 13 July, the Romanian monitor Mihail Kogălniceanu encountered a Soviet monitor near the village of Copana Balca. The Romanian monitor attacked, scoring a direct hit against her Soviet counterpart. The Soviet warship returned fire with no result before retreating.

=== Action of 14 July ===
On 14 July, Mihail Kogălniceanu attacked the Soviet monitor Udarnyy at Ismail. Like on the previous day, the Romanian monitor scored a direct hit against her Soviet foe, despite the latter's fierce return fire. Udarnyy continued firing while retreating, but yet again, no damage was inflicted upon the Romanian warship.

=== Action off Isaccea ===
At some point during the Operation, Romanian armed barges shelled and sank an armored motor gunboat off Isaccea.

== Air combat ==
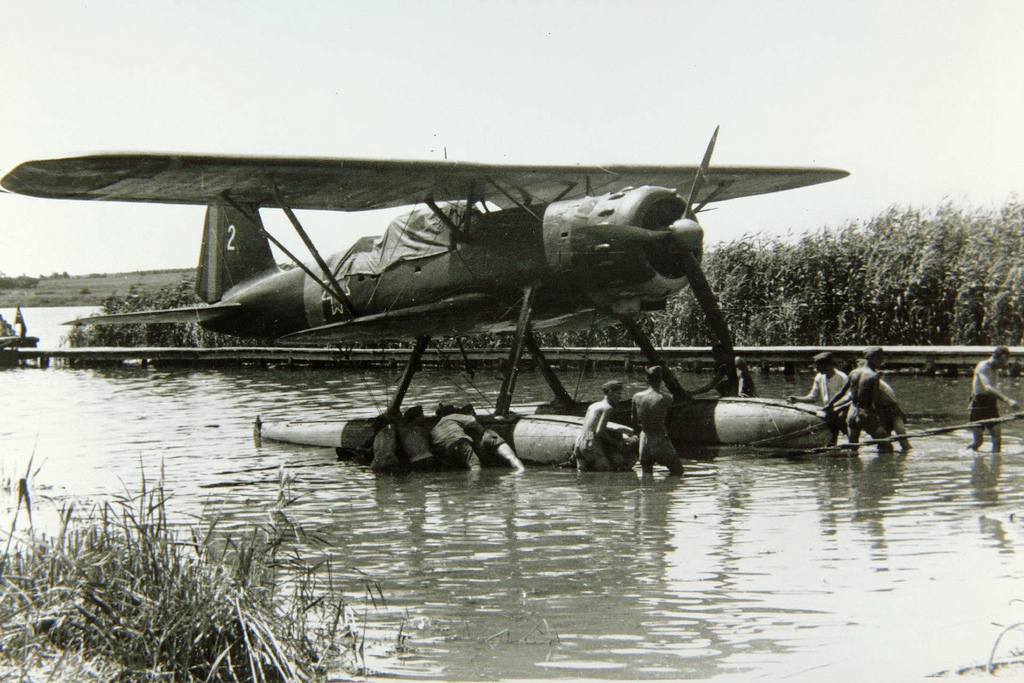
Romanian Heinkel He 114 floatplane during Operation München

The first Soviet-Romanian aerial combat was carried out by Sub-Lieutenant Teodor Moscu of Escadrila 51. While flying over Southern Bessarabia, his Heinkel He 112 was attacked by a formation of five Polikarpov I-16. The Romanian pilot swiftly shot down three of them, causing the other two to retreat. Eight more Soviet aircraft were shot down during this battle and 40 more were strafed on the ground, but the Romanians lost 11 of their own aircraft to Soviet ground fire. On 12 July, responding to a powerful Red Army counteroffensive, the Romanians assembled an air fleet of 59 bombers (mostly of Italian and Polish construction) escorted by 54 fighters (including Romanian-made IAR-80s). This mixed force swept the Soviets from the sky before decimating Soviet ground forces (artillery, troops, transports and tanks). In one instance, IAR-80 pilot Vasile Claru ran out of ammunition after destroying three of the six Polikarpovs pursuing him. Consequently, he rammed his plane into a fourth, killing a deputy Soviet squadron commander (M. Shamanov), but Claru himself didn't survive the crash either. Ultimately, the Soviet counteroffensive was repulsed with heavy losses. By 26 July, the Romanians had established air supremacy over Bessarabia and Northern Bukovina. They flew a total of 5,100 missions, claiming 88 enemy aircraft shot down in aerial combat plus 108 destroyed on the ground for the cost of 58 of their own aircraft. An additional 59 Soviet aircraft were shot down by Romanian flak.

== See also ==
- Romanian Navy during World War II
- Action of 9 July 1941
- Naval operations in Romanian-occupied Soviet waters

== Bibliography ==
- Axworthy, Mark; Scafeș, Cornel I.; Crăciunoiu, Cristian (1995). Third Axis Fourth Ally: Romanian Armed Forces in the European War, 1941–1945. London: Arms & Armour Press. ISBN 1-85409-267-7. OCLC 32552622.
