= Soviet Navy surface raids in the western Black Sea =

Soviet Navy surface raids on Western Black Sea
- Part of the Black Sea campaigns (1941–1944)
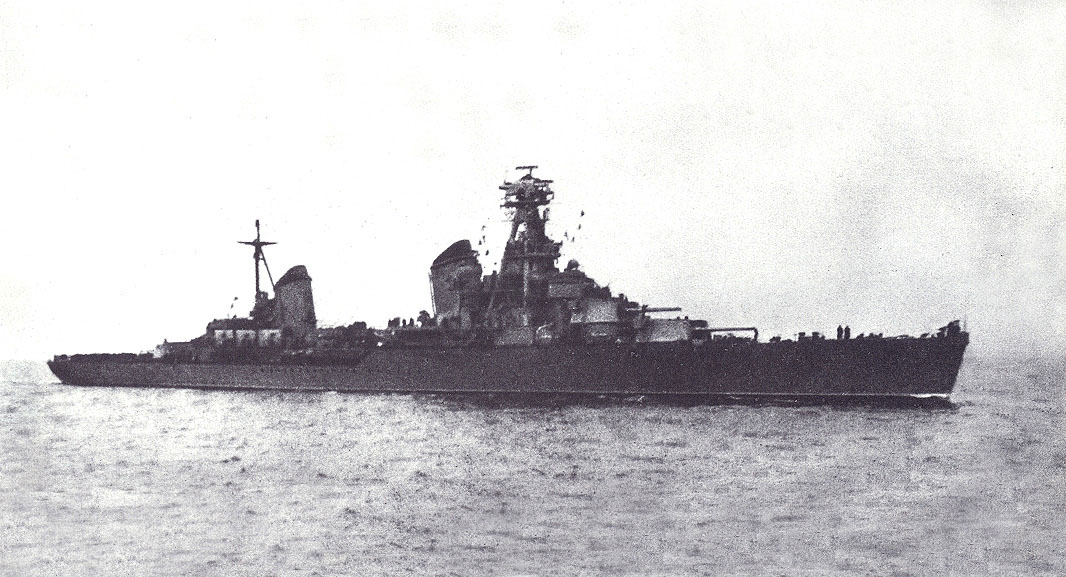
- Soviet cruiser Voroshilov
Date	22 June 1941 – 27 December 1942
Location	Western Black Sea
Result	Axis victory

Belligerents
Romania; Germany; Bulgaria	Soviet Union

Commanders and leaders
Horia Macellariu	(Soviet Union) Filipp Oktyabrskiy

Casualties and losses
3 merchants sunk 2 motor torpedo boats sunk 1 minelayer sunk 2 minesweepers sunk	1 cruiser damaged 1 leader destroyer sunk 1 destroyer damaged

The Soviet Black Sea Fleet during the first years of the Black Sea campaigns (1941–44) conducted raiding operations along the Western coast of the Black Sea aimed to disrupt Axis communications and supplies by sea.

== Background ==
At the beginning of the conflict, the Soviet Navy possessed a decisive superiority in terms of number and capabilities of warships over the Romanian Navy, while the German Navy had yet to deploy significant assets. However only few surface operations were carried on, with no decisive naval battle fought. The Soviet Navy's efforts were quickly drained to the Siege of Odessa and the subsequent Siege of Sevastopol (1941–42), while only submarines maintained constant (albeit costly) campaigns on the first and during the second year of naval warfare.

== Engagements in 1941 ==
The first and most significant surface engagement occurred on 26 June 1941, when a Soviet task force attacked Constanța. The Raid on Constanța involved the only destroyer-size engagement on the Black Sea during the war when Romanian destroyers NMS Mărăști and Regina Maria briefly engaged the Leningrad-class destroyers Moskva and Leningrad. Both Soviet units suffered light damage during the engagement, and Moskva sunk on a defensive minefield. As outcome of the action, while retaining naval superiority in Black Sea, the Soviet Navy's surface ships focused more in amphibious operations and ground support during the Siege of Odessa.

Soviet warships, while not attempting other raids against Axis shipping in 1941, laid mines on the Western Black Sea shipping lines. A field of mines laid by Fugas-class minesweepers T-404 Shchit and T-408 Yakor caused the loss between 24 and 25 October of German minelayer Theresia Wallner and the small minesweepers Drossel and Brusterort.

Mines laid by Soviet destroyers Smyshlyony and Bodry sank the Hungarian merchant Ungvár (961 GRT) on 9 November. When the Romanian motor torpedo boat Viforul and Vijelia sailed to attempt rescuing the ship, both were lost either to mines or the merchant's explosion.

Toward the end of the year, other Soviet-laid mines caused the loss of the Romanian merchant Cavarna (3495 GRT) and the German merchant Cordelia (1357 GRT) between 1 and 2 December 1941. The mines responsible for these losses were either the ones of destroyers Smyshlyony and Bodry, or the ones laid by gunboats Krasnaya Gruziya and Krasnyy Adzharistan.

== Engagements in late 1942 ==
In late 1942 Soviet Navy surface ships attempted once again to raid Romanian waters for Axis shipping, this time without further minelaying operations. Three main raids were attempted but were hampered by effective Axis intercept stations that alerted most merchants in the area to the Soviet naval presence.

- On 1 December 1942, the Soviet cruiser Voroshilov bombarded Snake Island together with the destroyers Soobrazitelny and Kharkov. The cruiser fired forty-six 180 mm and fifty-seven 100 mm shells, which struck the radio station, barracks and lighthouse on the island, but failed to inflict significant losses. Her shelling was cut short by Romanian mines, which significantly damaged her. However, she managed to return to Poti for repairs under her own power. At the same time, destroyers Boyky and Besposhchadny claimed to have intercepted and destroyed a small convoy with torpedoes and gunfire, however post-war discoveries found they actually shelled a group of rocks covered by fog.
- On 11–13 December, the Romanian torpedo boat NMS Smeul (commanded by Captain Dumitru Mitescu) along with four German R-boats escorted the transport ships Tzar Ferdinand and Oituz along the Romanian coast. In the morning of 13 December, the convoy was attacked by the destroyer Soobrazitelny and four Fugas-class minesweepers. The exchange of fire lasted for two hours, until Smeul launched a smokescreen which enabled the four R-boats to simulate a torpedo attack, causing the Soviet warships to retreat. None of the Axis or Soviet warships were damaged.
- The third and last Soviet raid was attempted on 27 December, once again Soobrazitelny and Besposhchadny sailed with support of four Fugas-class minesweepers to intercept enemy shipping. Axis forces were able to intercept Soviet naval radio signals which alerted them to the Red Fleet's plans and allowed them to avoid any permanent losses. The German merchant ship Saone became temporarily grounded while she rushed to harbor, but was not found by the raiding force and was later recovered.

== Outcome ==
Overall, Soviet surface actions failed to inflict significant damage to the Axis shipping lines. While minelaying operations inflicted some losses in 1941, they were not repeated the following year and three subsequent raids failed to intercept Axis shipping. Aside from submarine operations, in 1943 the Soviet Navy switched focus entirely to the Kerch–Eltigen Operation and other ground support missions.
