= NMS Regele Carol I =

Ship of the Romanian Maritime Service and the Romanian Navy

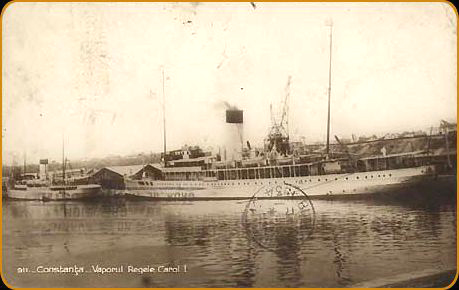

History

Romania
- Name: Regele Carol I
- Namesake: King Carol I of Romania
- Builder: Fairfield Shipbuilding and Engineering Company, Glasgow, Scotland, United Kingdom
- Completed: 1898
- Commissioned: July 1898
- Fate: Sunk by Soviet mine, 10 October 1941

General characteristics (as warship)
- Type: Seaplane tender/Minelayer
- Displacement: 2,653 tons (standard)
- Length: 93.2 m (305 ft 9 in)
- Beam: 12.8 m (42 ft 0 in)
- Draught: 5 m (16 ft 5 in)
- Propulsion: 2 shafts, 2 boilers (one coal and one oil), 6,500 shp (4,800 kW)
- Speed: 18 knots (33 km/h; 21 mph)
- Armament: 2 × 150 mm (5.9 in) guns; 28 mines
- Aircraft carried: 1 x seaplane

NMS Regele Carol I was a passenger ship of the Romanian Maritime Service and later a warship of the Romanian Navy, serving as both minelayer and seaplane tender. She was completed and commissioned in 1898 and sunk in 1941, during World War II.

== Construction and career ==
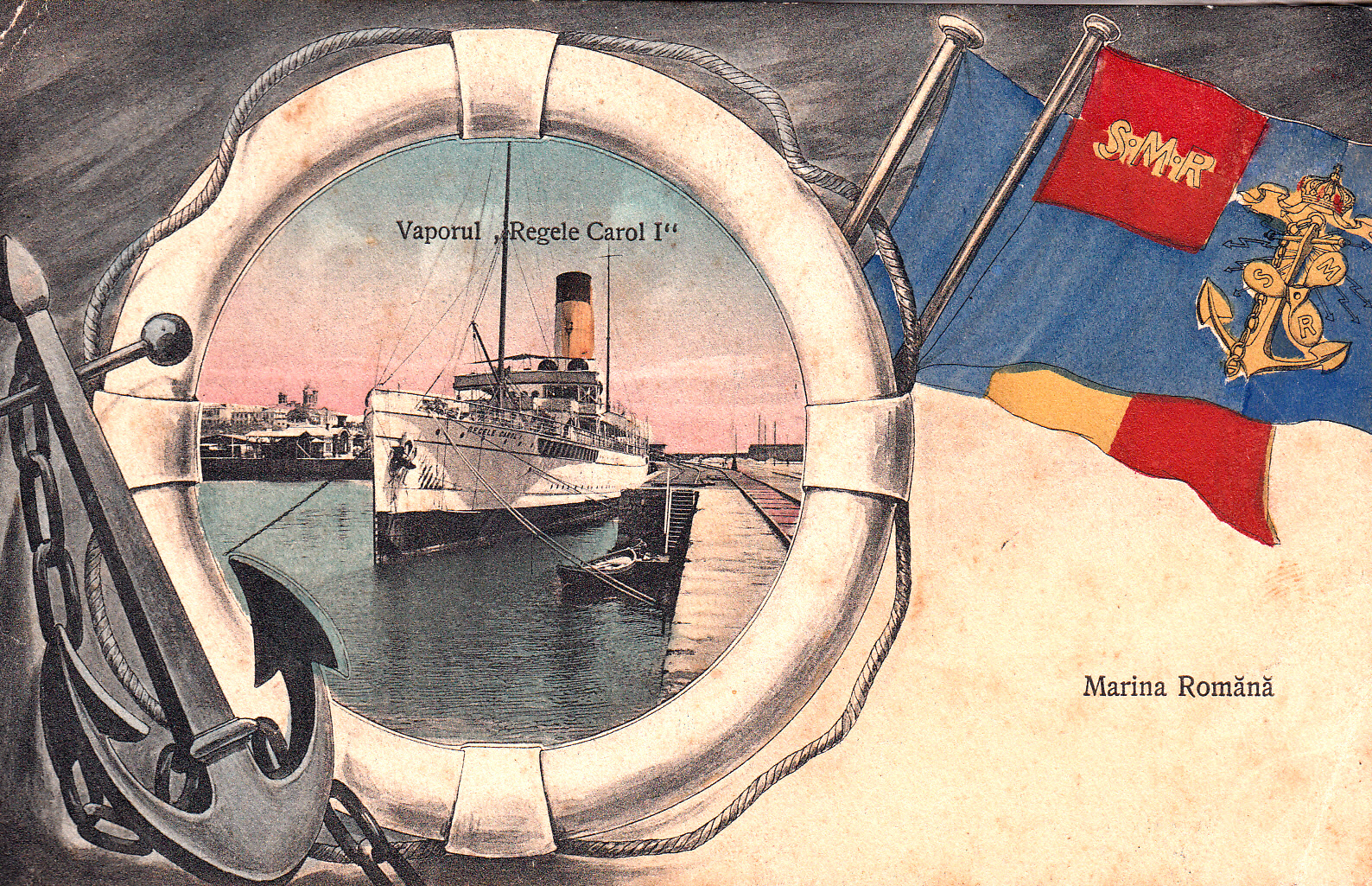
Postcard from 1916 depicting Regele Carol I

Regele Carol I was initially built as a passenger steamer and was completed by the Fairfield Shipbuilding and Engineering Company in Glasgow, Scotland, United Kingdom. The twin-screw ship was formally christened by the King of Romania and commissioned in July, 1898. Shortly after her commissioning, her Romanian owners changed her fuel from coal to a mixture of half coal and half oil (two separate boilers). This conversion offered several advantages: the ship became slightly faster, the fuel consumption dropped by around half (60-80 tons of oil instead of 150 tons of coal required to cover the same distance) and the size of her crew was reduced. The steamer displaced 2,653 tons and her power plant had an output of 6,500 horse power, generating a top speed of 18 knots. She measured 93.2 meters in length, with a beam of 12.8 meters and a draught of 5 meters. Internal work (mainly the music room) was by Glasgow architect William Leiper.

In 1916, after Romania joined World War I, Regele Carol I was leased to the Imperial Russian Navy and converted into a warship. She served as both minelayer and seaplane tender, carrying one aircraft as well as 28 mines. She was also armed with two 150 mm naval guns. After briefly being renamed Ion Roate in early 1917 (she was also known as Korol Carl in the Russian Navy), she was returned to Romania at some point between 1917 and 1919.

== World War II and sinking ==
At the start of Operation Barbarossa in June 1941, Regele Carol I and two other Romanian minelayers (Amiral Murgescu and Dacia) laid a flanking barrage of mines off Constanța for the protection of the port. In October 1941, these mines sank the Soviet M-class submarines M-58 and M-34.

On 7 October 1941, Regele Carol I took part in a large-scale minelaying operation off the Bulgarian coast. The so-called Operation Varna consisted in the minelaying of the Bulgarian coast by the Romanian minelayers Amiral Murgescu, Regele Carol I and Dacia, escorted by the Romanian 250t-class torpedo boats Năluca, Sborul and Smeul, the Romanian gunboats Sublocotenent Ghiculescu and Căpitan Dumitrescu (both of the same class) and the Bulgarian torpedo boats Drazki, Smeli and Hrabri (all three of the same class). On 10 October, Regele Carol I was sunk off of Varna, Bulgaria, by a mine laid by the Soviet submarine L-4.
