= List of World War II warship classes of the Royal Romanian Navy =

The following list includes the most important warships (ironclad warships, cruisers, destroyers and submarines) of the Royal Romanian Navy used during World War II.

Vessel	Origin	Type	Notes	Ref.
Ironclad warships
Potemkin	Russia	Pre-dreadnought battleship	The only battleship in the history of the Romanian Navy, possessed briefly after the 1905 uprising, 8–9 July 1905	
Mihail Kogălniceanu	Austria-Hungary/Romania	Monitor	Built in sections in the Austro-Hungarian port of Triest, transported to Romania by rail and assembled at the Galați shipyard in Romania between 1907 and 1908; converted to sea-going monitor in 1918	
Cruisers
Elisabeta	United Kingdom	Protected cruiser	Served as the flagship from the time she was built in Britain in 1888 until 1920, undergoing a major refit at the Galați shipyard in Romania between 1904 and 1905	
Destroyers
Mărăști	Italy	Flotilla leader	Built in Italy for the Romanian Navy, entered service in 1920 (refitted in Romania in 1925); officially classed as destroyer, her armament of 5 x 120 mm and 4 x 76 mm more closely resembled that of a light cruiser	
Mărășești	Italy	Flotilla leader	Built in Italy for the Romanian Navy, entered service in 1920 (refitted in Romania in 1925); officially classed as destroyer, her armament of 5 x 120 mm and 4 x 76 mm more closely resembled that of a light cruiser	
Regele Ferdinand	Italy	Destroyer	Built in Italy for the Romanian Navy, entered service in 1930	
Regina Maria	Italy	Destroyer	Built in Italy for the Romanian Navy, entered service in 1931	
Amiral Murgescu	Romania	Destroyer escort	Built at the Galați shipyard in Romania between 1938 and 1941; initially intended only as a minelayer, but eventually she was also armed and employed as a destroyer escort	
Tenders
Constanța	Italy	Submarine tender	Cruiser-sized submarine tender, largest purpose-built Romanian warship of World War II, built in Italy and entered service in 1931	
Submarines
Delfinul	Italy	Submarine	Built in Italy for the Romanian Navy, entered service in April 1936	
Rechinul	Romania	Submarine	Built at the Galați shipyard in Romania between 1938 and 1941	
Marsuinul	Romania	Submarine	Built at the Galați shipyard in Romania between 1938 and 1941	
CB-1	Italy	Midget submarine	Transferred to Romania after the surrender of Italy in September 1943, transferred to U.S.S.R. in August 1944, scuttled in 1955.	
CB-2	Italy	Midget submarine	Transferred to Romania after the surrender of Italy in September 1943, transferred to U.S.S.R. in August 1944, scuttled in 1955.	
CB-3	Italy	Midget submarine	Transferred to Romania after the surrender of Italy in September 1943, transferred to U.S.S.R. in August 1944, scuttled in 1955.	
CB-4	Italy	Midget submarine	Transferred to Romania after the surrender of Italy in September 1943, transferred to U.S.S.R. in August 1944, scuttled in 1955.	
CB-6	Italy	Midget submarine	Transferred to Romania after the surrender of Italy in September 1943, transferred to U.S.S.R. in August 1944, scuttled in 1955.	

== Sources ==
- Gardiner, Robert; Chesneau, Roger, eds. (1980). Conway's All the World's Fighting Ships 1922–1946. London: Conway Maritime Press. ISBN 0-85177-146-7 – via Internet Archive.
