= Horia Macellariu =

Romanian Counter Admiral (1894–1989)

- Horia Ion Pompiliu Macellariu
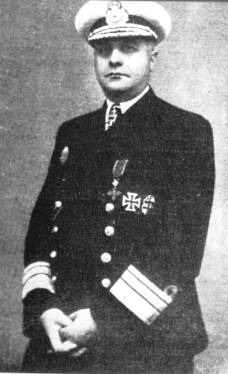
- Born: May 10, 1894; Craiova, Kingdom of Romania
- Died: July 11, 1989 (aged 95); Bucharest, Socialist Republic of Romania
- Burial place: Cozia Monastery
- Military career
- Allegiance: Kingdom of Romania
- Branch: Royal Romanian Navy
- Rank: Rear Admiral
- Conflicts: World War II; Black Sea campaigns (1941–1944); Operation Achse; Evacuation of the Crimea; Romanian Navy during World War II
- Awards: Order of the Crown (Romania); Legion of Honour; Order of Michael the Brave; Order of the Star of Romania; Knight's Cross of the Iron Cross; Order of the German Eagle

Horia Macellariu (10 May 1894 – 11 July 1989) was a Romanian rear admiral, commander of the Royal Romanian Navy's Black Sea Fleet during the Second World War.

== Early life ==
Horia Ion Pompiliu Macellariu was born in Craiova on 10 May [O.S. 28 April] 1894. After undergoing military studies, he became a marine officer in 1915. During World War I, he served as the captain of the Romanian command ship Principele Nicolae. Throughout the war, he distinguished himself, being decorated with the Order of the Romanian Crown, Knight rank. In 1927–1928, he studied at the Naval War School in Paris, where the French President also decorated him with the Legion of Honour, Knight rank. After returning to Romania, he commanded several Romanian warships throughout the 1930s: the torpedo boat Vârtejul, the river monitor Lascăr Catargiu, the monitor Mihail Kogălniceanu and the destroyer Regina Maria.

== Career during World War II ==
When Romania entered the war with Nazi Germany against the Soviet Union on 22 June 1941, he was appointed Chief of Staff of the Romanian Navy at the Romanian General Staff. He climbed through the ranks as the war progressed, in January 1942 becoming the commander of the Romanian Destroyer Squadron, the most powerful naval formation of the Romanian Navy and of the Axis powers in the Black Sea, consisting of two destroyers (Regele-Ferdinand-class) and two scout cruisers Aquila-class). In early 1943, he became the commander of the Romanian Black Sea Fleet, gaining the rank of Rear-Admiral in March that year.

=== Commander of the Romanian Black Sea Fleet ===
As a commander, he presided over a significant enlargement of the Romanian Black Sea Fleet, most notably the commissioning of the Romanian-built submarines Marsuinul and her smaller sister ship Rechinul in May 1943, the former being the most powerful and modern Axis submarine in the Black Sea. Between 1939 and early 1943, Romania built six new motor torpedo boats. They were of the British Power type, but licence-built in Romania at the Galați shipyard, being commissioned as Vântul, Vârtejul, Vulcanul, Vedenia, Viforul, and Vijelia. He arranged a further enlargement of the Romanian Black Sea Fleet in September 1943, when, upon Italy's surrender, he orchestrated the transfer of the five Italian midget submarines operating in the Black Sea to the Romanian Navy. The five submarines were commissioned on 30 November that year.

The evacuation of the Crimea in April–May 1944 was the most complex and extensive operation of the Romanian Navy during the Second World War. From 15 April to 14 May, numerous German and Romanian warships escorted many convoys between Constanța and Sevastopol. The scale and importance of the operation can be attested by the usage in combat of all four Romanian destroyers, the largest Axis warships in the Black Sea. The last phase of the evacuation (10–14 May) saw the fiercest combat, as Axis ships transported, under constant attacks from Soviet aircraft and shore artillery, over 30,000 troops. Of these, 18,000 were transported by Romanian ships. In total, Romanian and German convoys evacuated over 113,000 Axis troops from the Crimea, most of them (over 63,000) during the first phase of the evacuation (15–25 April). No Romanian Navy warships were lost during the evacuation, however the destroyer Regele Ferdinand came close to being sunk. She was struck by a large aerial bomb, which fell in her fuel tanks, but failed to detonate. The bomb was extracted several days after the end of the operation. Two naval actions involving the Romanian Navy took place during the second phase of the evacuation (25 April – 10 May), near Sevastopol. On 18 April, the Soviet Leninets-class submarine L-6 was twice attacked with depth charges and damaged by the Romanian gunboat Ghiculescu, numerous bubbles emerged from the depths after each attack, before being finished off by the German submarine hunter UJ-104. During the night of 27 April, a convoy escorted by the Romanian gunboat Ghiculescu, the German submarine hunter UJ-115, one R-boat, two KFK naval trawlers and 19 MFPs (including the Romanian PTA-404 and PTA-406) engaged the Soviet G-5-class motor torpedo boats TKA-332, TKA-343 and TKA-344, after the three attacked and damaged the German submarine hunter UJ-104. Ghiculescu opened fire with tracer rounds, enabling the entire escort group to locate the two Soviet MTBs and open fire. TKA-332 was hit and sunk. Over 12 Soviet aircraft were also shot down during the evacuation, including two by the minelaying destroyer escort Amiral Murgescu. The last Axis pockets in the Crimea were destroyed on 12 May. The last Axis warship to leave the peninsula was Amiral Murgescu, carrying on board 1,000 Axis troops, including the German General Walter Hartmann. Macellariu's successful conduct of the evacuation and the achievements obtained by the Romanian warships under his command, in combat and number of Axis troops evacuated, earned him the Knight's Cross of the Iron Cross (Crucea de Cavaler a Crucii de Fier, in Romanian). Other decorations bestowed upon him include the Order of the Star of Romania, the Order of the German Eagle and the Order of Michael the Brave.

After the 23 August 1944 coup which put Romania on the side of the Allies, the situation became uncertain. German Vice Admiral Helmuth Brinkmann had orders to hold Constanța at all costs. However, after a face-to-face meeting with Macellariu, he was persuaded to make an orderly retreat and avoid an unnecessary and costly battle. The Germans subsequently retreated on the night of 25–26 August.

== After the war ==
Macellariu was arrested by the communist authorities on 19 April 1948 and incarcerated at Jilava Prison. After a trial, he was sentenced to hard labor for life for high treason, a sentence subsequently reduced to 25 years. He served time at Aiud Prison, where he was detained in complete isolation, and on 4 April 1958 he was moved to Râmnicu Sărat Prison. After this prison was closed on 13 April 1963, he was transferred to Gherla Prison, where he shared a cell with Nicolae Steinhardt. He was freed from detention on 29 July 1964, when political prisoners in Romania were amnestied by Gheorghe Gheorghiu-Dej. He died in Bucharest on 11 July 1989, aged 95.

== Awards ==
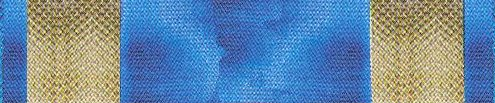
- Order of the Crown (Romania), Knight rank (1918)
- Legion of Honour, Knight rank (1928)
- Order of Michael the Brave (1943)
- Order of the Star of Romania (1944)
- Knight's Cross of the Iron Cross (1944)
- Order of the German Eagle (1944)

== Legacy ==
One of the two Rear-Admiral Eustațiu Sebastian-class corvettes of the Romanian Navy is named after him. A street in Sector 1 of Bucharest also bears his name.
