= Căpitan Nicolae Lascăr Bogdan-class torpedo gunboat =

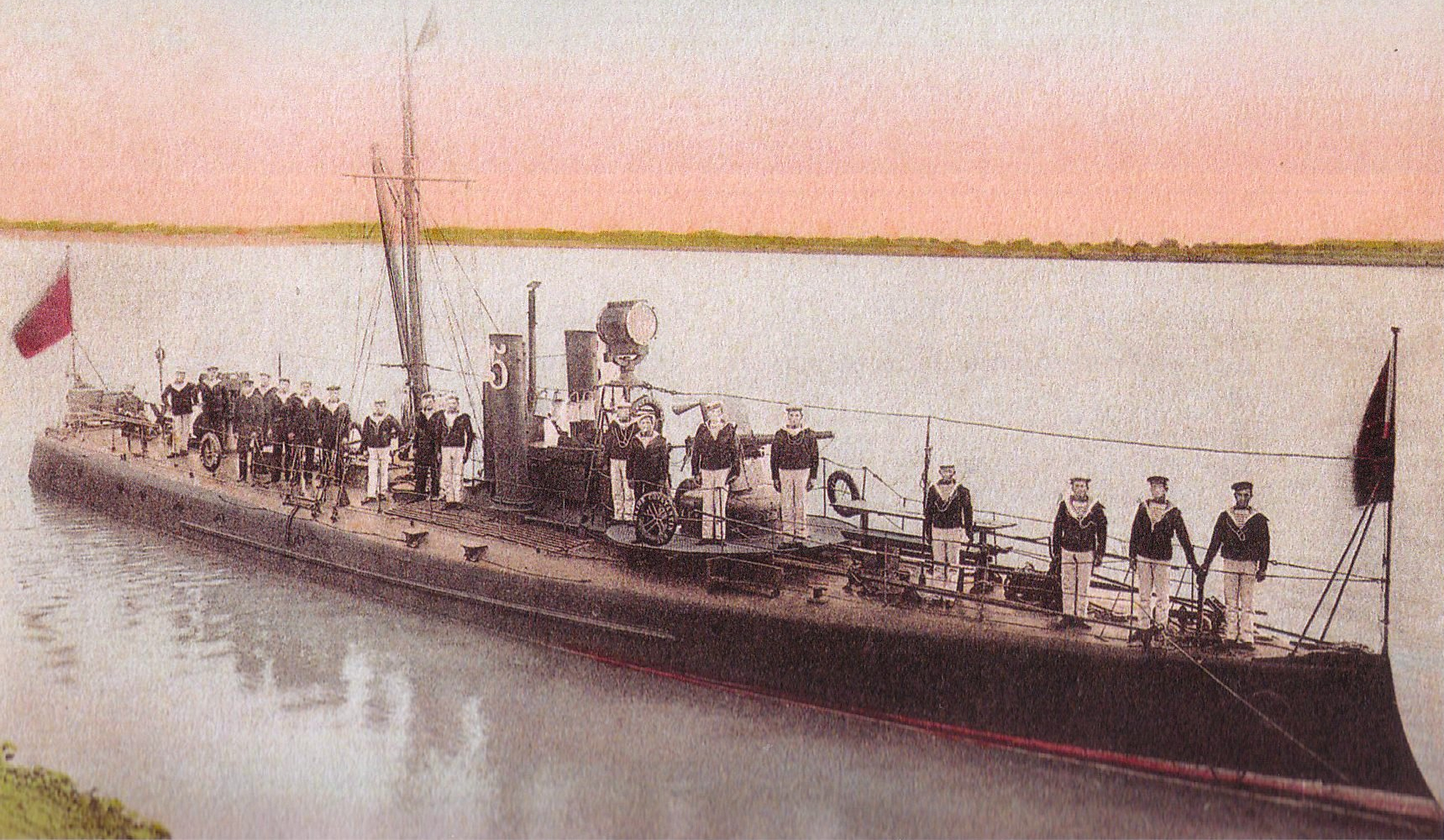

Class overview
- Name: Căpitan Nicolae Lascăr Bogdan-class torpedo gunboat
- Builders: Thames Iron Works, London
- Operators: Royal Romanian Navy; Soviet Navy
- Built: 1906–1907
- In service: 1907–1958
- Planned: 12
- Completed: 8
- Canceled: 4
- Lost: 1
- Retired: 7

General characteristics
- Displacement: 45 tons (normal); 51 tons (full load)
- Length: 30 meters
- Beam: 4 meters
- Draft: 0.8 meters
- Propulsion: 2 compound engines, 2 shafts, 550 hp
- Speed: 18 knots
- Range: 7.6 tons of fuel
- Complement: 20
- Armament: World War I: 1 x 47 mm Skoda naval gun; 1 x 6.5 mm Maxim machine gun; 4 torpedoes (two on spars and two in drop collars); World War II: 1 x 47 mm Skoda naval gun; 1 x 20 mm Rheinmetall AA gun; 1 x 300 mm depth charge thrower
- Notes: Bulletproof sides and deck

The Căpitan Nicolae Lascăr Bogdan-class was a group of eight riverine torpedo gunboats of the Romanian Navy which served during the First World War and the Second World War.

== Construction and specifications ==
Twelve boats were planned as part of the 1899 naval programme, but this was reduced to 8. The boats were built at the Thames Iron Works in the United Kingdom from 1906 to 1907 and delivered through inland rivers. Each boat measured 30 meters in length, with a beam of 4 meters and a draught of 0.8 meters. Normal displacement amounted to 45 tons, growing to 51 tons for a full load. Power plant consisted of two compound engines powering two shafts, generating 550 hp which resulted in a top speed of 18 knots. Each vessel could carry up to 7.6 tons of fuel. With a full complement of 20, each of the boats was armed with one 47 mm Skoda gun, one 6.5 mm Maxim machine gun and two spar torpedoes, as well as torpedo dropping gear amidships. The sides and deck were protected by bulletproof armor.

== Career ==
The eight vessels were classed as river torpedo boats, and served as such during the First World War as part of the Danube Division. Căpitan Mărăcineaunu was mined and sunk at the end of 1916. By 1940 three boats remained, Căpitan Romano Mihail, Locotenent Dimitrie Călinescu and Maior Gheorghe Șonțu. Before the war the three were fitted with a 300 mm depth charge thrower. Their 6.5 mm machine gun was also replaced by a German 20 mm autocannon.

The three remaining ships were captured by the Soviet Union in 1944 and incorporated into the Danube Flotilla as SKA-754, SKA-755, and SKA-756, and were used to guard the port of Izmail. They would be returned to Romania in September 1945.

== Ships ==
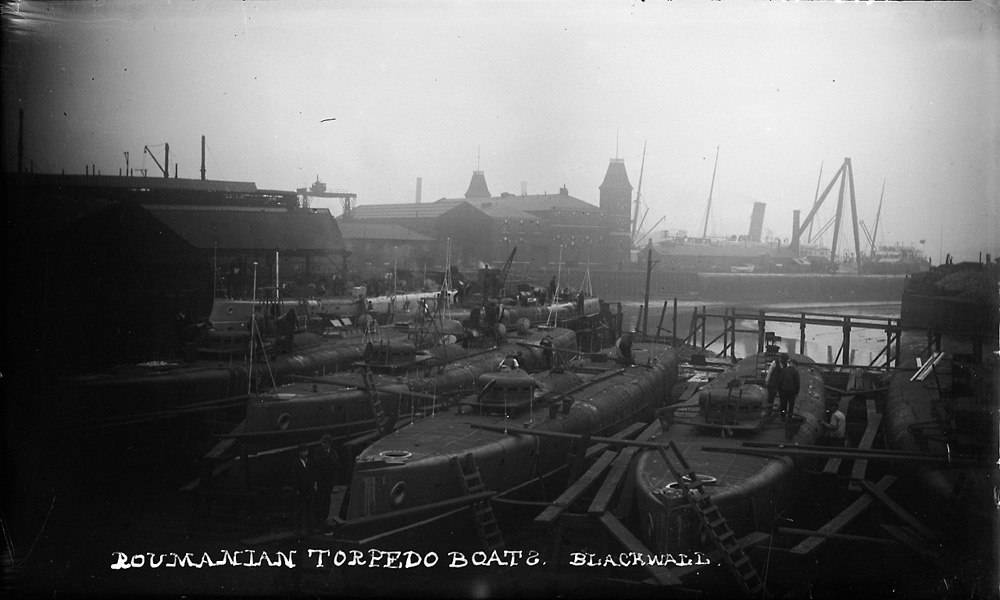
The CNLB-class torpedo gunboats under construction at the Thames Iron Works

Ships in class
Number	Name	Image	Builder	Laid down	Fate
1	Maior Constantin Ene		Thames Iron Works, London	1906	Scrapped in 1959-1960
2	Căpitan Nicolae Lascăr Bogdan		Thames Iron Works, London	1906	Scrapped in 1959-1960
3	Căpitan Mihail Romano		Thames Iron Works, London	1906	Scrapped in 1959-1960
4	Maior Dimitrie Giurescu		Thames Iron Works, London	1906	Scrapped in 1959-1960
5	Maior Gheorge Șonțu		Thames Iron Works, London	1906	Scrapped in 1959-1960
6	Maior Nicolae Grigore Ioan		Thames Iron Works, London	1906	Scrapped in 1959-1960
7	Locotenent Dimitrie Călinescu		Thames Iron Works, London	1906	Scrapped in 1959-1960
8	Căpitan Valter Mărăcineanu		Thames Iron Works, London	1906	Sunk by mine, 1916
