= NMS Smeul (1920) =

Romanian torpedo boat

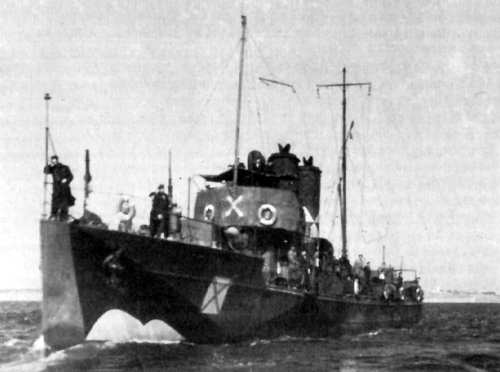
- NMS Smeul

History

Austria-Hungary
- Name: Tb 83 F
- Builder: Ganz & Danubius
- Laid down: 1913
- Launched: 1914
- Commissioned: 1915
- Fate: Given to Romania as reparations, 1920

Romania
- Name: Smeul
- Namesake: Romanian mythological creature
- Commissioned: 1920
- Out of service: 1944
- Reinstated: 1946
- Fate: Broken up, 1960

Soviet Union
- Name: Toros
- Commissioned: 1944
- Fate: Returned to Romania, 1945

General characteristics
- Class & type: 250t-class torpedo boat
- Displacement: 266 tons (standard); 330 tons (full load)
- Length: 58.5 m (191 ft 11 in)
- Beam: 5.8 m (19 ft 0 in)
- Draft: 1.5 m (4 ft 11 in)
- Propulsion: 2 Yarrow boilers, 2 AEG turbines, 2 shafts, 5,000 horse power
- Speed: 28 knots (52 km/h)
- Range: 1,200 nautical miles (2,200 km)
- Complement: 38
- Armament: World War II: 2 x 66 mm Škoda naval guns; 2 x 20 mm Oerlikon AA guns; 1 x 400 mm depth charge thrower

NMS Smeul was a torpedo boat of the Royal Romanian Navy. She was commissioned in 1920, after initially serving as Tb 83 F in the Austro-Hungarian Navy during World War I. She and six more sister ships were awarded to Romania as reparations after the war ended.

== Construction and specifications ==
A vessel of the F-group of the 250t class, Smeul was built by Ganz & Danubius at Fiume and nearby Porto Re, along with the rest of her group, between October 1913 and December 1916. Under the designation 83 F, she was laid down in 1913, launched in 1914 and completed in 1915. She had a waterline length of 58.5 m (191 ft 11 in), a beam of 5.8 m (19 ft 0 in), and a normal draught of 1.5 m (4 ft 11 in). While her designed displacement was 266 tonnes (262 long tons), she displaced about 330 tonnes (320 long tons) fully loaded. The crew consisted of 38 officers and enlisted men. Her AEG-Curtiss turbines were rated at 5,000 shp (3,700 kW) with a maximum output of 6,000 shp (4,500 kW), enabling her to reach a top speed of 28 knots (52 km/h; 32 mph). She carried 20 long tons (20.3 t) of coal and 34 long tons (34.5 t) of fuel oil, which gave her a range of 1,200 nmi (2,200 km; 1,400 mi) at 16 knots (30 km/h; 18 mph). Under the provisions of the Treaty of Saint-Germain-en-Laye, she was awarded as reparations to Romania in 1920, along with six more boats of the same class. During World War II, she had no torpedo tubes. These were replaced by depth charges, her artillery consisting of two 66 mm naval guns and two 20 mm anti-aircraft guns. The depth charges were deployed using one 400 mm thrower.

== Career ==
While fighting on the Axis side during World War II, she was involved in the minelaying operation of the Bulgarian coast in October 1941 and escorted the Romanian minelayers Amiral Murgescu and Dacia when they laid mines near Odessa in June 1942.

On 14 October 1942, the Soviet M-class submarine M-32 unsuccessfully attacked the Romanian destroyer Regele Ferdinand near Cape Burnas, the submarine being subsequently depth-charged and damaged by Smeul.

On 11–13 December 1942, under the command of Captain Dumitru Mitescu, Smeul escorted the Axis transport ships Tzar Ferdinand and Oituz along the Romanian coast, along with four German R-boats. In the morning of 13 December, the convoy was attacked by the Soviet destroyer Soobrazitelny and four Fugas-class minesweepers. The exchange of fire lasted for two hours, until Smeul launched a smokescreen which enabled the four R-boats to simulate a torpedo attack, causing the Soviet warships to retreat. None of the Axis or Soviet warships were damaged.

After the 23 August 1944 coup, she was commissioned by the Soviet Navy as Toros. In October 1945, she was returned to Romania. After being refitted at the Galați shipyard, she was recommissioned in 1946 and finally broken up in 1960.

== See also ==
- Romanian Navy during World War II
