= NMS Marsuinul =

WW2 Romanian Navy submarine

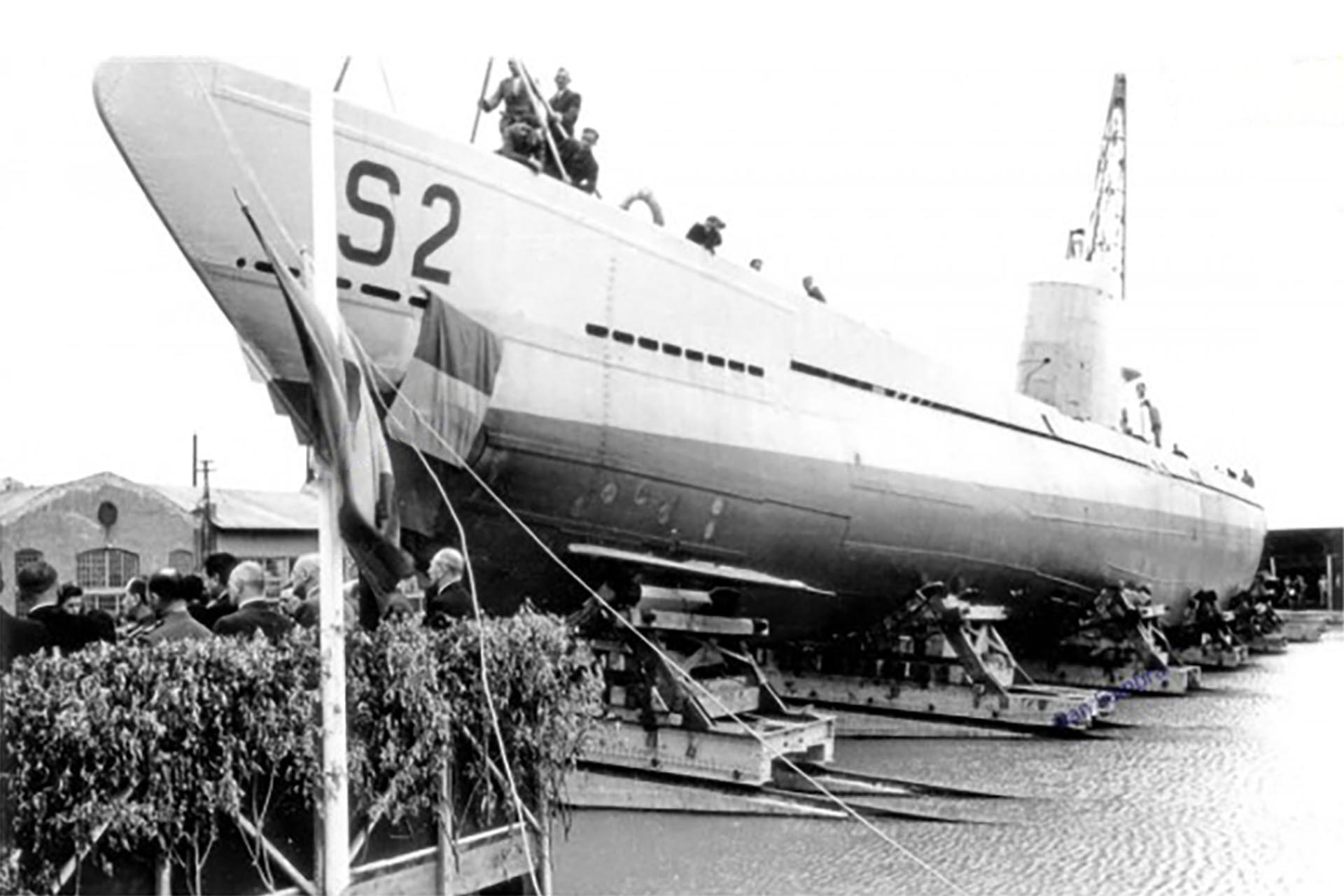
- Launching of the Marsuinul

History

Romania
- Name: Marsuinul
- Builder: Galați shipyard, Romania
- Laid down: 1938
- Launched: 4 May 1941
- Commissioned: May 1943
- Out of service: 1944
- Fate: Captured by the Soviet Union

Soviet Union
- Name: TS-2 (Cyrillic: ТС-2)
- Commissioned: 20 October 1944
- Fate: Sunk by internal explosion 20 February 1945

General characteristics
- Displacement: 620 tons (surfaced)
- Length: 58 m (190 ft 3 in)
- Beam: 5.6 m (18 ft 4 in)
- Draft: 3.6 m (11 ft 10 in)
- Propulsion: 2 MAN diesel engines, 2 electric motors, 2 shafts
- Speed: 16 knots (30 km/h; 18 mph) surfaced; 9 knots (17 km/h; 10 mph) submerged
- Range: 8,000 nmi (15,000 km; 9,200 mi)
- Test depth: 110 m (360 ft 11 in)
- Complement: 45
- Armament: 1 x 105 mm SK C/32 naval gun; 1 x 37 mm SK C/30 AA gun; 6 × 533 mm torpedo tubes

NMS Marsuinul (The Porpoise) was a submarine of the Romanian Navy, one of the few warships built in Romania during the Second World War. She was the largest Romanian-built submarine and the most powerful and modern Axis submarine in the Black Sea.

== Construction and specifications ==
Marsuinul was designed by NV Ingenieurskantoor voor Scheepsbouw in the Hague, at first bearing the designation S-2. Her design was an improvement of the earlier Vetehinen-class of the Finnish Navy. She was laid down at the Galați shipyard in 1938 and launched on 4 May 1941. She had a standard (surfaced) displacement of 620 tons, a length of 58 meters, a beam of 5.6 meters and a draught of 3.6 meters. Her power plant consisted of two MAN diesel engines and two electric motors powering two shafts, giving her a top speed of 16 knots on surface and 9 knots in immersion. She was armed with one 105 mm deck gun, one 37 mm anti-aircraft gun and six 533 mm torpedo tubes (four in the bow and two in the stern), her crew amounting to 45. Her maximum diving depth was of 110 meters with a range of over 8,000 nautical miles.

== Career ==
Marsuinul was commissioned, like her half-sister Rechinul, in May 1943. She spent almost a year undergoing sea drills and tests, along with Rechinul, only being declared ready for action in April 1944. She carried out only one patrol mission, between 11 and 27 May 1944, along the Turkish coast, between Eregli and Trabzon, and near the Soviet port of Batumi. Shortly after she departed, she was attacked by German warships off Varna, Bulgaria, after being mistaken for a Soviet submarine. After reaching Batumi, she was spotted several times by Soviet forces, each time being attacked with depth charges by Soviet warships and aircraft. On 19 May alone, 43 Soviet depth charges were dropped on her. On 20 May, a Soviet submarine launched a torpedo at her, which missed. The submarine subsequently called for submarine chasers, which dropped 31 more depth charges. On 21 May, she was again attacked with 43 depth charges, as she began her trip back home. After a perilous journey, she reached Constanța at the end of the month with no damage and no casualties.

== Fate ==
She was captured by Soviet forces after the 23 August 1944 coup and commissioned as TS-2 on 20 October. She was sunk at Poti on 20 February 1945 by the accidental explosion of one of her own torpedoes. She was later raised, repaired, and recommissioned as N-40 in August 1947. She was renamed S-40 in June 1949 and scrapped after November 1950.

== German propaganda ==
The German Propaganda Department made the most of the launching of the two Romanian submarines in May 1941, implying that these would be the first of a steady supply which would reinforce the Axis in the Black Sea.

== See also ==
Rechinul - Marsuinul's half-sister
