= NMS Sborul =

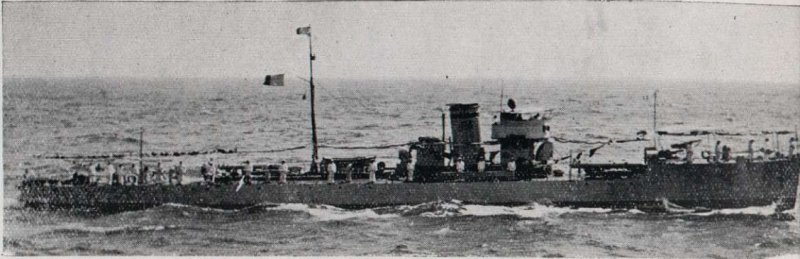

History

Austria-Hungary
- Name: Tb 81 T
- Builder: Stabilimento Tecnico Triestino
- Laid down: 6 February 1914
- Launched: 6 August 1914
- Commissioned: 1 December 1914
- Fate: Given to Romania as reparations, 1920

Romania
- Name: Sborul
- Namesake: The Romanian word for flight
- Commissioned: 1920
- Out of service: 1944
- Reinstated: 1945
- Fate: Broken up, 1958

Soviet Union
- Name: Musson
- Commissioned: 1944
- Fate: Returned to Romania, 1945

General characteristics
- Class & type: 250t-class torpedo boat
- Displacement: 262 tons (standard); 320 tons (full load)
- Length: 58.2 m (190 ft 11 in)
- Beam: 5.7 m (18 ft 8 in)
- Draft: 1.5 m (4 ft 11 in)
- Propulsion: 2 Yarrow boilers, 2 Parsons turbines, 2 shafts, 5,000 horse power
- Speed: 28 knots (52 km/h)
- Range: 980 nautical miles (1,810 km)
- Complement: 39
- Armament: World War II: 2 x 66 mm Škoda naval guns; 2 x 20 mm Oerlikon AA guns; 2 x 450 mm torpedo tubes

NMS Sborul was a torpedo boat of the Royal Romanian Navy. She was commissioned in 1920, after initially serving as Tb 81 T in the Austro-Hungarian Navy during World War I. She and six more sister ships were awarded to Romania as reparations after the war ended.

== Construction and specifications ==
A vessel of the T-group of the 250t-class, Sborul was built by STT at the Port of Trieste. Under the designation 81 T, she was laid down on 6 February 1914, launched on 6 August that year and commissioned on 1 December. She had a waterline length of 58.2 m (190 ft 11 in), a beam of 5.7 m (18 ft 8 in), and a normal draught of 1.5 m (4 ft 11 in). While her designed displacement was 262 tonnes (258 long tons), she displaced about 320 tonnes (310 long tons) fully loaded. The crew consisted of 39 officers and enlisted men. Her Parsons turbines were rated at 5,000 shp (3,700 kW) with a maximum output of 6,000 shp (4,500 kW), enabling her to reach a top speed of 28 knots (52 km/h; 32 mph). She carried 18 tonnes (17.7 long tons) of coal and 24 tonnes (23.6 long tons) of fuel oil, which gave her a range of 980 nmi (1,810 km; 1,130 mi) at 16 knots (30 km/h; 18 mph). Under the provisions of the Treaty of Saint-Germain-en-Laye, she was given as reparations to Romania in 1920, along with six more boats of the same class. Notably, Sborul was the only Romanian torpedo boat of the Second World War to still have her torpedo tubes. Along with the destroyers Mărăști and Mărășești, she was the only warship of the Romanian Navy to use 450 mm torpedoes, as opposed to most of the other vessels which used 533 mm torpedoes. Her armament consisted of two 66 mm naval guns, two 20 mm anti-aircraft guns and two 450 mm torpedo tubes.

== Career ==
Sborul was captured by Soviet forces in 1944 and commissioned by the Soviet Navy as Musson. She was returned to Romania on 22 September 1945 and continued to serve until 1958, when she was scrapped.

While fighting on the Axis side during World War II, she was involved in the minelaying operation of the Bulgarian coast in October 1941. Sborul also took part in the Battle of Jibrieni on 17 December 1941.
