= NMS Sublocotenent Ghiculescu =

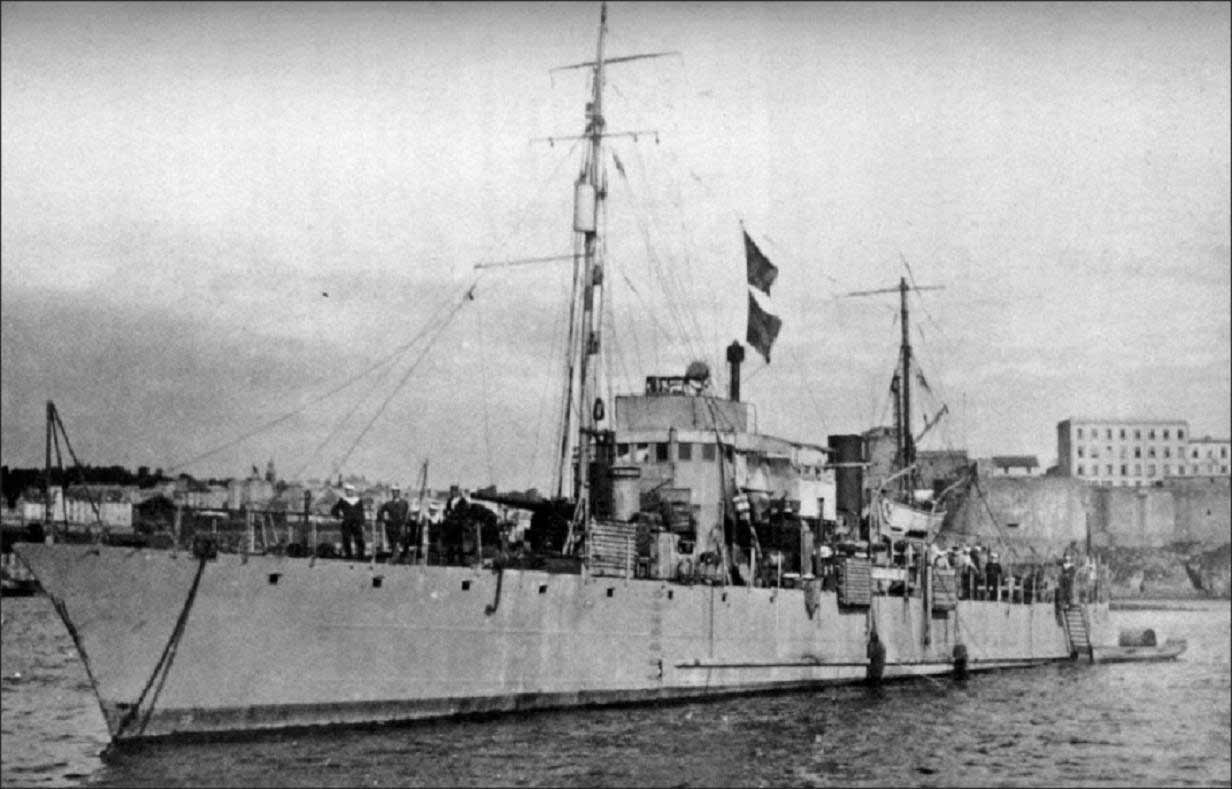
- Sublocotenent Ghiculescu at sea

History

France
- Name: Mignonne
- Builder: Arsenal de Brest, France
- Launched: 1917
- Completed: 1918
- Commissioned: 1918
- Out of service: 1920
- Fate: Sold to Romania

Romania
- Name: Sublocotenent Ghiculescu
- Commissioned: 1920
- Out of service: 1944
- Reinstated: 1945
- Fate: Stricken, 2002

Soviet Union
- Name: Angara
- Commissioned: 1944
- Out of service: 1945
- Fate: Returned to Romania

Service record
- Operations: Evacuation of the Crimea
- Victories: 2 submarines and 1 MTB sunk

General characteristics
- Class & type: Friponne-class gunboat
- Type: Gunboat
- Displacement: 344 tons (standard); 443 tons (full load)
- Length: 62.1 m (203 ft 9 in)
- Beam: 7 m (23 ft 0 in)
- Draft: 2.9 m (9 ft 6 in)
- Propulsion: 2 Sulzer diesel engines, 2 shafts
- Speed: 15 knots (28 km/h; 17 mph)
- Range: 3,000 nautical miles (5,600 km; 3,500 mi) at 10 knots (19 km/h; 12 mph)
- Complement: 50
- Armament: As built: 2 × 100 mm naval guns; 2 x 400 mm depth charge throwers; World War II: 2 × 100 mm naval guns; 4 x 20 mm Oerlikon AA guns; 2 x 400 mm depth charge throwers

NMS Sublocotenent Ghiculescu was a specialized ASW gunboat of the Romanian Navy. Initially built as a French warship in late World War I, she was purchased by Romania in 1920 and fought during World War II, sinking two submarines and one motor torpedo boat. After 1 year of Soviet service, she was returned to Romania and served as a survey vessel until 2002.

== Construction and specifications ==
Sublocotenent Ghiculescu was a gunboat of the French Friponne class. She was built at Arsenal de Brest, being launched in 1917 and commissioned by the French Navy as Mignonne in 1918. She was sold to Romania in January 1920. Like her sisters, the gunboat displaced between 344 and 443 tons, measuring 62.1 meters in length, with a beam of 7 meters and a deep-load draught of 2.9 meters. Power plant consisted of two Sulzer diesel engines powering two shafts, resulting in an output of 900 hp which gave her a top speed of 15 knots. She had a range of 3,000 nautical miles at 10 knots and 1,600 nautical miles at 15 knots. She was armed with two 100 mm naval guns and two 400 mm depth-charge throwers, her crew amounting to 50.

== Service ==
During World War II, her armament was increased. Her two 100 mm naval guns were supplemented by four 20 mm anti-aircraft guns. She also retained her two 400 mm depth charge throwers. She had 3 identical sisters which also served during the war: Dumitrescu, Stihi and Lepri Remus. Lepri Remus was fitted with mine rails and converted to minelayer.

She escorted a total of 17 Axis convoys in the Black Sea.

On 1 October 1942, the Soviet M-class submarine M-118 attacked and sank the German transport ship Salzburg, which was carrying on board 2,000 Soviet prisoners of war. After attacking, the submarine was located by a German BV138C flying boat, and Sublocotenent Ghiculescu together with sister ship Stihi Eugen were sent to the scene. The two Romanian gunboats attacked the Soviet submarine with depth-charges, sinking her with all hands.

On 18 April 1944, during the evacuation of the Crimea, the Soviet Leninets-class submarine L-6 was sunk with depth charges near Sevastopol by the Sublocotenent Ghiculescu, aided by the German submarine chaser UJ-104.

During the night of 27 April, a convoy escorted by the Romanian gunboat Sublocotenent Ghiculescu, the German submarine hunter UJ-115, one R-boat, two KFK naval trawlers and 19 MFPs (including the Romanian PTA-404 and PTA-406) engaged the Soviet G-5-class motor torpedo boats TKA-332, TKA-343 and TKA-344, after the three attacked and damaged the German submarine hunter UJ-104. Ghiculescu opened fire with starshell rounds, enabling the entire escort group to locate the two Soviet MTBs and open fire. TKA-332 was hit and sunk.

She was captured by Soviet forces in September 1944 and was commissioned as Angara. In October 1945, she was returned to Romania and served as a survey vessel until 2002.
