= Bulgarian Navy =

- Военноморски сили на Република България; Voennomorski sili na Republika Balgariya
- Ensign of the Bulgarian Navy
- Founded: 13 January 1899 (127 years, 9 months)
- Country: Bulgaria
- Type: Navy
- Role: Defense of the Bulgarian sea territory and eliminating enemy units
- Size: 4,450 active personnel
- Part of: Bulgarian Armed Forces
- Garrison/HQ: Varna; Atia
- Patron: Saint Nicholas
- Anniversaries: 9 August
- Engagements: First Balkan War; Second Balkan War; World War I World War II; 2011 military intervention in Libya
- Website: navy.mod.bg

Commanders
- Commander of the Navy: Rear Admiral Kyril Yordanov Mikhailov

Insignia
- Naval ensign

- Naval jack

- Coast guard ensign

- Bulgarian navy rank

The Bulgarian Navy (Bulgarian: Военноморски сили на Република България, romanized: Voennomorski sili na Republika Balgariya, lit. 'Naval Forces of the Republic of Bulgaria') is the navy of the Republic of Bulgaria and forms part of the Bulgarian Armed Forces.

The Principality of Bulgaria established its navy soon after its creation, in 1879, to operate on the Danube river and the Black Sea, but the young country could spend only limited resources on warships. In the conflicts of the 20th century in which Bulgaria was involved - the Balkan Wars, World War I and World War II, the navy played a limited role, mainly protecting Bulgarian harbors and shipping. The navy's greatest combat feat was a torpedo attack against an Ottoman cruiser during the First Balkan War that forced the ship to retreat.

In the aftermath of World War II, the People's Republic of Bulgaria was a part of the Eastern Bloc and the navy was reorganized and supplied with Soviet-made equipment. It participated in various Warsaw Pact naval exercises, but took no part in any military operations. The navy reached its peak, in both materiel and personnel, in the late 1980s, but even then its most powerful ships were frigates and destroyers.

After the fall of the Soviet Union and Bulgaria's communist regime, all Bulgarian armed forces fell in decline due to their reduced relevance, and the economic crisis of the 1990s limited the resources that could be set aside for their modernization. The Navy was no exception. After a period of negotiations and reforms in order to comply with NATO standards, Bulgaria was admitted in the alliance in 2004. Since then, the Navy has acquired and operates a small number of relatively modern vessels.

Since the 1940s, the Bulgarian Navy has two main bases, each near one of the two major commercial port cities in the country - Varna and Burgas (by the village of Atia).

== Operational history ==
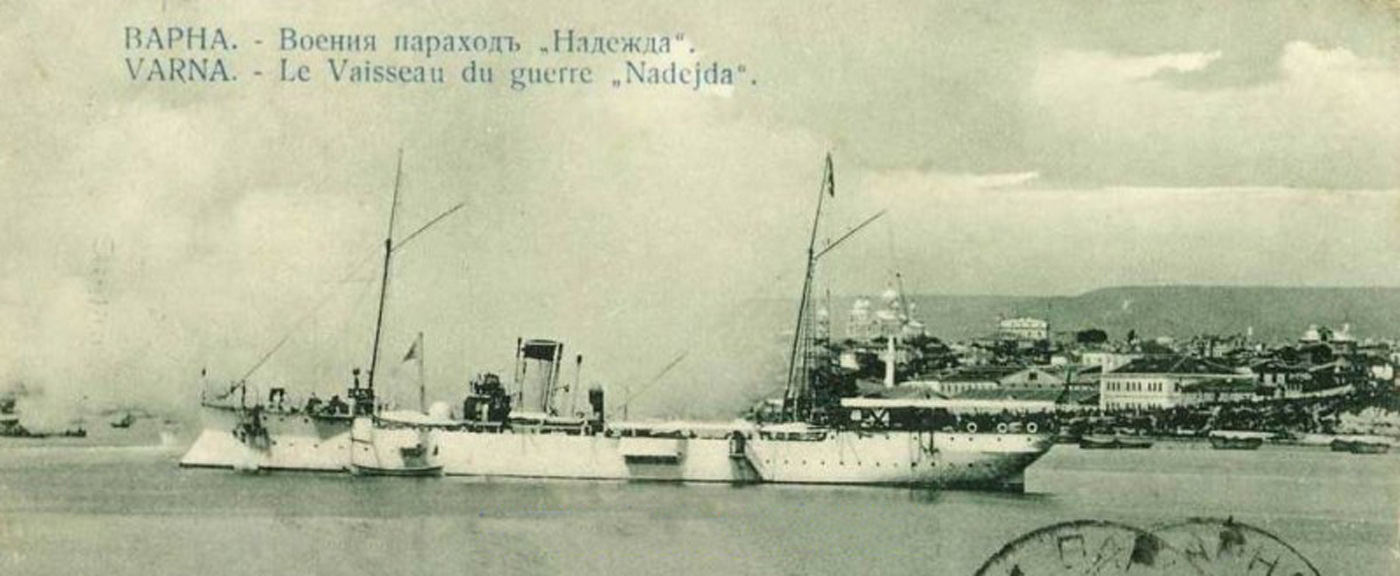
Bulgarian torpedo gunboat Nadezhda

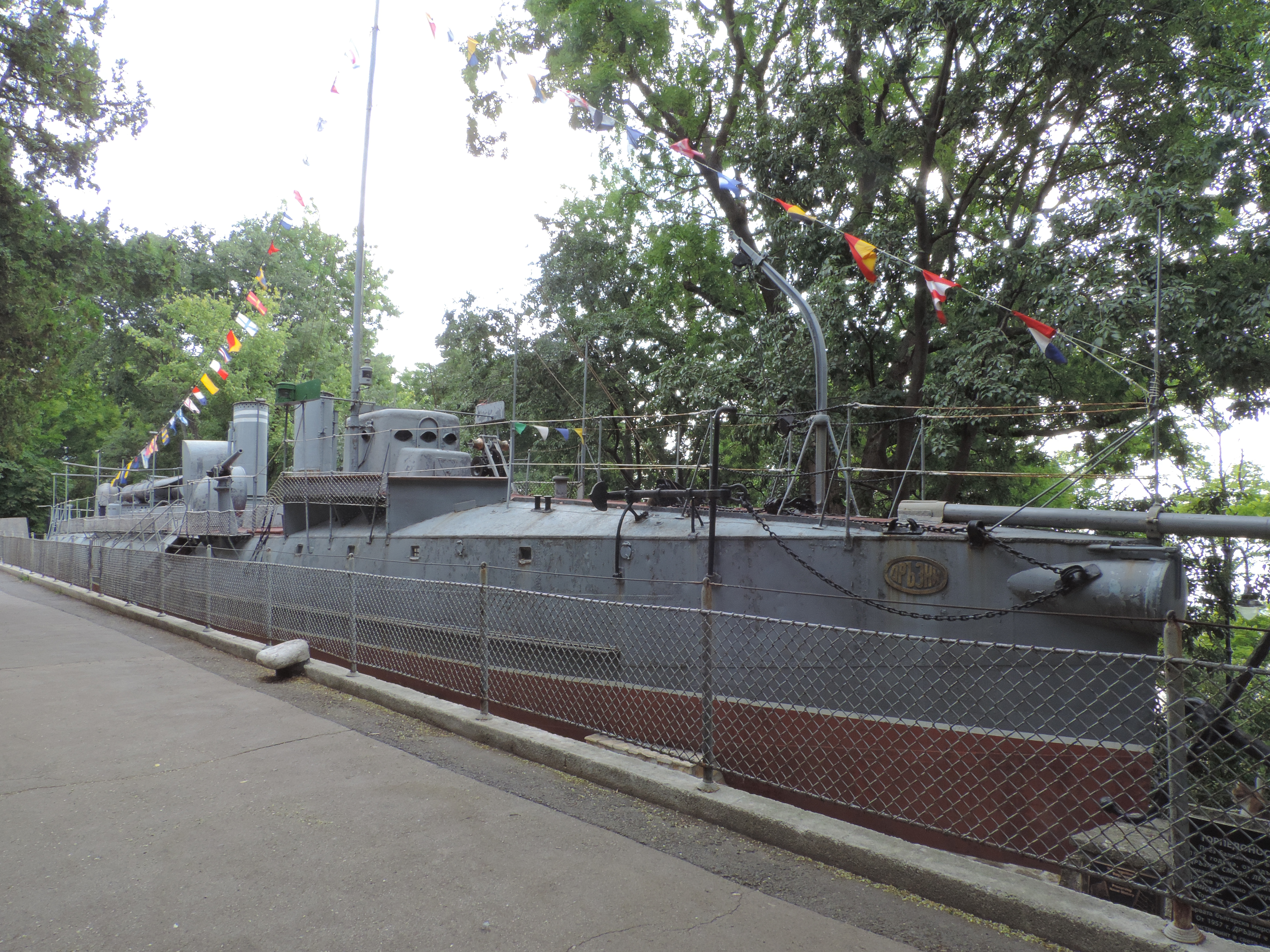
Drazki as a museum ship on static display in Varna, Bulgaria

=== First Balkan War ===
The Bulgarian Navy's first combat action was the 1912 Battle of Kaliakra during the First Balkan War, when four Bulgarian torpedo boats attacked the Ottoman cruiser Hamidiye; Bulgarian torpedo boat Drazki managed to score a hit, forcing Hamidiye to retreat back to Istanbul for emergency repairs.

=== Second Balkan War ===
The Bulgarian Navy scuttled its four Danube gunboats during the Second Balkan War, probably to avoid capture by the invading Romanian Army. The four gunboats were 400-600-ton vessels, with a top speed of 11 knots (20 km/h; 13 mph) and armed with two-to-four 75 mm (3 in) guns and two-to-four 47 mm (1.9 in) guns. They were still present on the Bulgarian Navy list in August 1916.

=== World War I ===
When Bulgaria entered World War I in 1915, its navy consisted mainly of a French-built torpedo gunboat called Nadezhda and six torpedo boats. It mainly engaged in mine warfare actions in the Black Sea against the Russian Black Sea Fleet and allowed the Germans to station two U-boats at Varna, one of which came under Bulgarian control in 1916 as Podvodnik No. 18. Russian mines sank one Bulgarian torpedo boat and damaged one more during the war.

=== World War II ===
The Bulgarian Navy during World War II supported the Axis powers in the Black Sea and consisted mainly of four obsolete Drazki-class torpedo boats, four modern Lurrsen type motor torpedo boats out of five ordered, and three formerly Dutch motor torpedo boats. Bulgaria and the Soviet Union were not at war with each other, but there was still little naval fighting with Soviet submarines operating in Bulgarian waters, its main action taking place in October 1941.

The so-called Operation Varna consisted in the minelaying of the Bulgarian coast by the Romanian minelayers Amiral Murgescu, Regele Carol I and Dacia, escorted by Romanian 250t-class torpedo boat Năluca, Sborul and Smeul, Romanian gunboats Sublocotenent Ghiculescu and Căpitan Dumitrescu and Bulgarian torpedo boats Drazki, Smeli and Hrabri. The operation, lasting between 7 and 16 October 1941, was largely successful, as despite the loss of the Romanian auxiliary minelayer Regele Carol I to a Soviet mine, the five minefields laid by the Romanian minelayers along the Bulgarian coast are credited with the sinking of four Soviet submarines: S-34, L-24, Shch-211 and Shch-210, although the latter could have also been sunk by German aircraft or depth-charged by the Bulgarian patrol boats Belomorets and Chernomorets.

On 6 December 1941, Belomorets and Chernomorets depth-charged and sank the Soviet submarine Shch-204.

Soviet submarines also laid mines near the Bulgarian coast. The 2304-ton Bulgarian steamer Shipka ("Шипка", also transliterated Chipka) was sunk off Varna in September 1941 by mines laid by the submarine L-4.

On 19 May 1943, the Bulgarian torpedo boat Smeli foundered between Varna and Burgas during a storm.

Any hostilities ended when Bulgaria changed sides and joined the Allied powers in September 1944.

=== Cold War ===
In line with Soviet naming practices the navy of the Bulgarian People's Army was called the Military-Maritime Fleet (Bulgarian: Военноморски флот, ВМФ). The merchant marine, which was to mobilize in wartime in support of the regular navy was called Bulgarian Sea Fleet (Български морски флот, БМФ).

In the 1970s the Burgas Naval Base relocated to Atia with a corresponding change in name.

The Naval Fleet Staff was located in Varna.

=== Post Warsaw Pact ===
The Bulgarian Communist Party was forced to give up its political monopoly on 10 November 1989 under the influence of the Revolutions of 1989. With the restoration of freedom from the Warsaw Pact entanglement, it became a member of NATO in 2004, and after several years of reforms, it joined the European Union and the single market in 2007, despite EU concerns over government corruption.

In order to meet some of the NATO requirements, the Bulgarian government purchased a Wielingen-class frigate from Belgium in 2005. Wandelaar (F-912), built in 1977, was renamed to Drazki. That same year the Bulgarian frigate Smeli took part as a full NATO member for the first time in Operation Active Endeavour. In 2006, following a decision of the Bulgarian National Assembly, Drazki deployed as part of the United Nations Interim Forces in Lebanon (UNIFIL), patrolling the territorial waters of Lebanon under German command. This was the first time the Bulgarian Navy took part in an international peacekeeping operation. The Bulgarian government purchased two more Wielingen-class frigates and one Tripartite-class minehunter in 2007.

On 21 July 2020 took place the official inauguration of the Maritime Coordination Center in Varna. This was an important step towards greater NATO and regional cooperation in the Black Sea region.

== Command structure in 1989 ==
=== Directly subordinate to Naval Staff ===
- Electronic Warfare Section (Отделение РЕБ)
  - Independent Electronic Warfare Battalion type "NS" (Отделен батальон тип "НС") (one company type N for jamming of enemy communications and one company type S for jamming of enemy targeting systems)
- 8th Submarine Division, Varna Naval Base, with 4x Romeo-class submarines (Afterwards two were decommissioned without replacement in 1990, one in 1992, and the last one in 2011.)
  - 81 Pobeda (Победа, "Victory", delivered in 1972, former Soviet S-57), 82 Victoria (Виктория, delivered in 1972, former Soviet S-212), 83 Nadezhda (Надежда, "Hope", delivered in 1983, former Soviet S-36), 84 Slava (Слава, "Glory", delivered in 1985, former Soviet S-38) (traditional female names)
- 2nd Coastal Missile Brigade, south of Varna, with 4K51 Rubezh anti-ship missiles
- 10th Missile & Torpedo Boat Brigade, in Sozopol (mixed composition of the divisions, the torpedo boats had the dual role to attack enemy vessels with their torpedoes and to provide target acquisition for the missile boats)
  - 122 (Commander's cutter, 10-ton Soviet project 371)
  - 10th Missile & Torpedo Boat Division
    - Project 205 missile boats: 101 Svetkavitsa (Светкавица, "Lightning", delivered in 1982, former Soviet R-496, improved project 205U); 102 Uragan (Ураган, "Hurricane", delivered in 1977, former Soviet R-169, improved project 205U); 103 Burya (Буря, "Storm", delivered in 1971, former Soviet R-176?, basic project 205)
    - Project 206 torpedo boats: 104 Orel (Орел, "Eagle"), 105 Yastreb (Ястреб, "Hawk"), 106 Albatros (Албатрос)
  - 11th Missile & Torpedo Boat Division
    - Project 205 missile boats: 111 Tayfun (Тайфун, "Typhoon", delivered in 1982, former Soviet R-496, improved project 205U); 112 Gram (Гръм, "Thunder", delivered in 1977, former Soviet R-169, improved project 205U); 113 Smerch (Смерч, "Whirlwind", delivered in 1971, former Soviet R-176?, basic project 205)
    - Project 206 torpedo boats : 114 Bars (Барс, "snow leopard"), 115 Yaguar (Ягуар, "Jaguar"), 116 Pantera (Пантера, "Panther")
  - Coastal Base Sozopol (Брегова база Созопол, the brigade's logistic formation)
    - 274 (fireboat project 364 of Soviet build)
- 25th Signals Regiment, in Varna
- 63rd Anti-submarine Helicopter Squadron, at Chayka Independent Naval Helicopter Base in Varna (in the Chayka suburb), flying 8x Mi-14PL anti-submarine helicopters (nr. 801, and nr. 810 of the original ten were lost), 1 x Mi-14BT (nr. 811; nr. 812 had been retired in 1986 and the minesweeping equipment removed from 811. Afterwards nr. 811 was used for transport tasks) and 1 x Ka-25C (Hormone-B, nr. 821, used for OTH targeting of the shore-based AShM systems).
- 65th Maritime Special Reconnaissance Detachment (65-ти Морски Специален Разузннавателен Отряд (65ти МСРО)), in Varna (Tihina) (Navy frogmen)
- 130mm Coastal Artillery Training Battery, in Varna (in wartime the navy would mobilize the 1st (Varna) and 2nd (Burgas) Coastal Artillery Regiments with 5 batteries each)
- People's Higher Naval School "Nikola Vaptsarov", in Varna
- 44th Surveillance and Signals Battalion - Danube River, in Ruse (44-ти батальон за наблюдение и свръзки - река Дунав) (Radar and SIGINT)
- Rear (Тил) (logistic services)

=== Varna Naval Base ===
- Varna Naval Base, in Varna
  - 2 commander's cutters of Project 371
  - 1st Anti-Submarine Ships Division
    - Riga-class frigates: 11 Drazki (Дръзки, "daring, bold", delivered in 1957, former Soviet Black Sea Fleet SKR-67), 12 Smeli (Смели, "Brave", delivered in 1958, former Black Sea Fleet SKR-53, replaced on Sept 4 1989 by the Koni-class frigate 11 "Brave", this caused renumbering of the Riga-class ships, but they were retired only a year later), 13 Bodri (Бодри, "Cheerful", delivered in 1985, former Soviet Baltic Fleet SKR "Kobchik")
    - Poti-class small ASW ships: 14 Khrabri (Храбри, "Brave", delivered in 1975, former Soviet MPK-106), 15 Bezstrashni (Безстрашни, "Fearless", delivered in 1975, former Soviet MPK-125)
  - 3rd Minesweepers Division
    - 31 Iskar (Искър, after the river), 32 Tsibar (Цибър), 33 Dobrotich (Добротич, after the medieval ruler), 34 Kapitan-Leytenant Kiril Minkov (Капитан-лейтенант Кирил Минков), 35 Kapitan-Leytenant Evstati Vinarov (Капитан-лейтенант Евстати Винаров), 36 Kapitan I Rang Dimitar Paskalev (Капитан I-ви ранг Димитър Паскалев) (minehunters project 257D/DME, Soviet second hand, NATO reporting name Vanya)
  - 5th Minesweepers Division (Coastal Base Balchik)
    - 51 - 56 (minehunters of project 1259.2 project "Malachite", NATO reporting name Olya, built in Michurin), 2 auxiliary cutters of project 501 (former auxiliary minesweeping boats) and a commander's cutter of project 371
  - 18th Independent Division of Special Purpose Ships (former 18th Harbour Area Security Ships, includes supply, rescue and support ships and small patrol craft)
    - 300 General Vladimir Zaimov (Генерал Владимир Заимов) (Command ship Bulgarian project 589, built in Ruse, also used for SIGINT of the Turkish Navy)
    - 221 Yupiter (Юпитер, "Jupiter") (East German fire-/ tugboat project 700, used as fireboat, salvage tugboat, submarine rescue ship and target tow for the coastal artillery and ships)
    - 401 Admiral Branimir Ormanov (Адмирал Бранимир Орманов) (Polish project 861-МВ hydrographic ship, built in 1977)
    - 206 Kapitan I Rang Dimitar Dobrev (Капитан І ранг Димитър Добрев) (Polish project 1799 (class 130 for the Soviet Navy) degaussing ship, built in 1988, the modern Polish Navy ship ORP Kontradmirał Xawery Czernicki is a development on the same hull type)
    - 311 Anton Ivanov, later Mitsar and Anlain ("Антон Иванов", "Мицар", "Анлайн", Auxiliary transport (replenishment) ship Bulgarian project 102, built in Ruse in 1979, main task was to provide en route replenishment for the Bulgarian ships, committed to the Soviet Navy Operational Mediterranean Squadron)
    - 223 (diving support boat Bulgarian project 245, built in Varna in 1980)
    - 121, 215 and 216 (multirole motor cutters Bulgarian project 160, built in Varna)
    - 1 fireboat type L26, pennant number changed several times (built in Rostock, GDR in 1954-55)
    - 218 and 219 (auxiliary cutters, former minesweeping boats type R376 "Sever")
  - 55th Surveillance and Signals Battalion (55-ти батальон за наблюдение и свръзки) (Radar and SIGINT)
  - Repair Workshop
  - Shore based support units

=== Atia Naval Base ===
- Atia Naval Base, east of Burgas
  - 2 commander's cutters of project 371
  - 4th Small Anti-Submarine Ships Division
    - Poti-class small ASW ships: 41 Letyashti (Летящи, "flying"; delivered in 1982, former Soviet MPK-77), 42 Bditelni (Бдителни, "Vigilant"; delivered in 1982, former Soviet MPK-148), 43 Naporisti (Напористи, "persistent, assertive"; delivered in 1982, former Soviet MPK-109), 44 Strogi (Строги, "stern, rigorous"; delivered in 1975 to Varna, transferred in 1982 to Burgas, former Soviet MPK-59)
  - 6th Minesweepers Division
    - 61 Briz (Бриз, "breeze"), 62 Shkval (Шквал, "squall"), 63 Priboy (Прибой, "surf"), 64 Shtorm (Щорм, "sea storm") (minehunters project 1265 "Yakhont")
    - 65, 66, 67, 68 (minesweepers project 1258E "Korund", NATO reporting name Yevgenya)
  - 7th Landing Ships Division
    - 701 "Sirius" ("Сириус") and 702 "Antares" ("Антарес") (Polish project 770Е medium tank landing ships, NATO reporting name Polnocny)
    - 703 - 712 (Soviet project 106K small tank landing ship and auxiliary minelayers, practically self-propelled landing barges, built in Ruse and Burgas, NATO reporting name Vydra)
    - (another 14 project 106K small tank landing ships and auxiliary minelayers mothballed after construction and stored by Bulgarian Sea Fleet (the state-owned merchant marine) as wartime mobilization stock)
  - 96th Independent Division of Special Purpose Ships (former 96th Harbour Area Security Ships, includes supply, rescue and support ships and small patrol craft)
    - 301 Kapitan Kiril Halachev ("Капитан Кирил Халачев") (Command ship Bulgarian project 589, built in Ruse)
    - 302 Atiya (Атия; auxiliary transport (replenishment) ship Bulgarian project 102, built in Ruse in 1987, main task was to provide en route replenishment for the Bulgarian ships, committed to the Soviet Navy Operational Mediterranean Squadron)
    - 323 (diving support boat Bulgarian project 245, built in Varna in 1980)
    - 331 (torpedo salvage boat Bulgarian project 205, built in Varna in 1980)
    - 312 and 313 (multirole motor cutters Bulgarian project 160, built in Varna)
    - 1 fireboat type L26, pennant number changed several times (built in Rostock, GDR in 1954-55)
    - 57 and 58 (auxiliary cutters, former minesweeping boats type R376 "Sever")
  - 66th Surveillance and Signals Battalion (66-ти батальон за наблюдение и свръзки) (Radar and SIGINT)
  - Coastal Radiolocation Station "Periscope I" (ELINT unit)
  - Repair Workshop
  - Shore based support units

==== Naval equipment ====
In 1989, the people's navy's inventory consisted of:

- 4x Romeo-class submarines (all decommissioned, with last in 2011)
- 3x Riga-class frigates (One decommissioned 1989, two in 1990)
- 1x Koni-class frigate (Commissioned December 1989)
- 6x Poti-class anti-submarine warfare corvettes (all decommissioned 1993-2005)
- 1x Pauk-class corvette (Commissioned in 1989, a second Pauk-class corvette was transferred from the Soviet Union in 1990)
- 6x Osa-class missile boats (all decommissioned, starting in 2008)
- 6x Shershen-class torpedo boats (all discarded & scrapped, 1992)
- 2x Polnocny-class landing ships (decommissioned)
- 6x Vanya-class minesweepers (all ships retired by the mid-1990s)
- 4x Yevgenya-class minesweepers (decommissioned?)
- 4x Sonya-class minesweepers (one ship decommissioned?)
- 6x Olya-class minesweepers (two ships decommissioned?)
- 34x R376 type "Yaroslavets" axillary cutters in various configurations (most decommissioned?)

== Organization 2025 ==
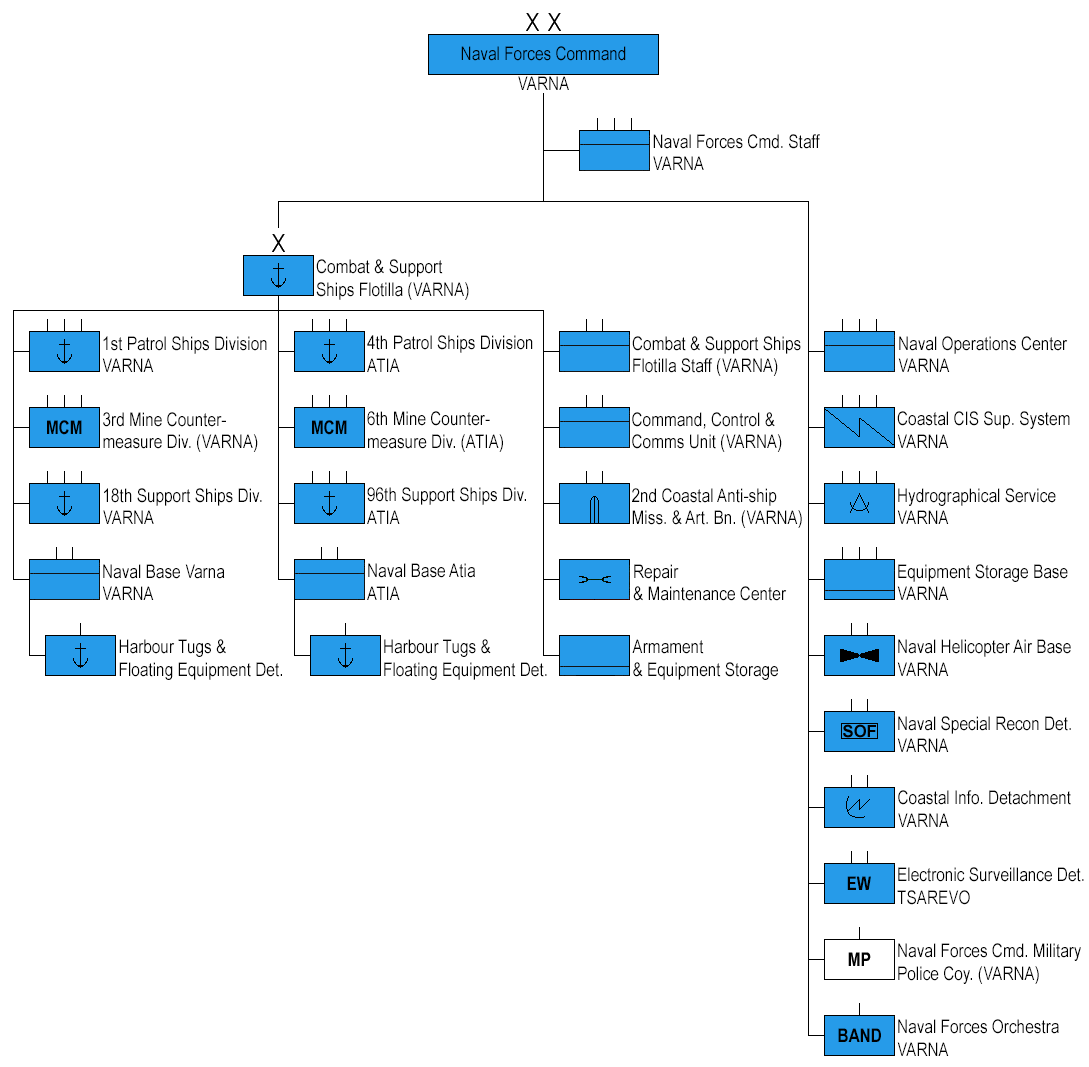
Naval Forces organization 2025 (click to enlarge)

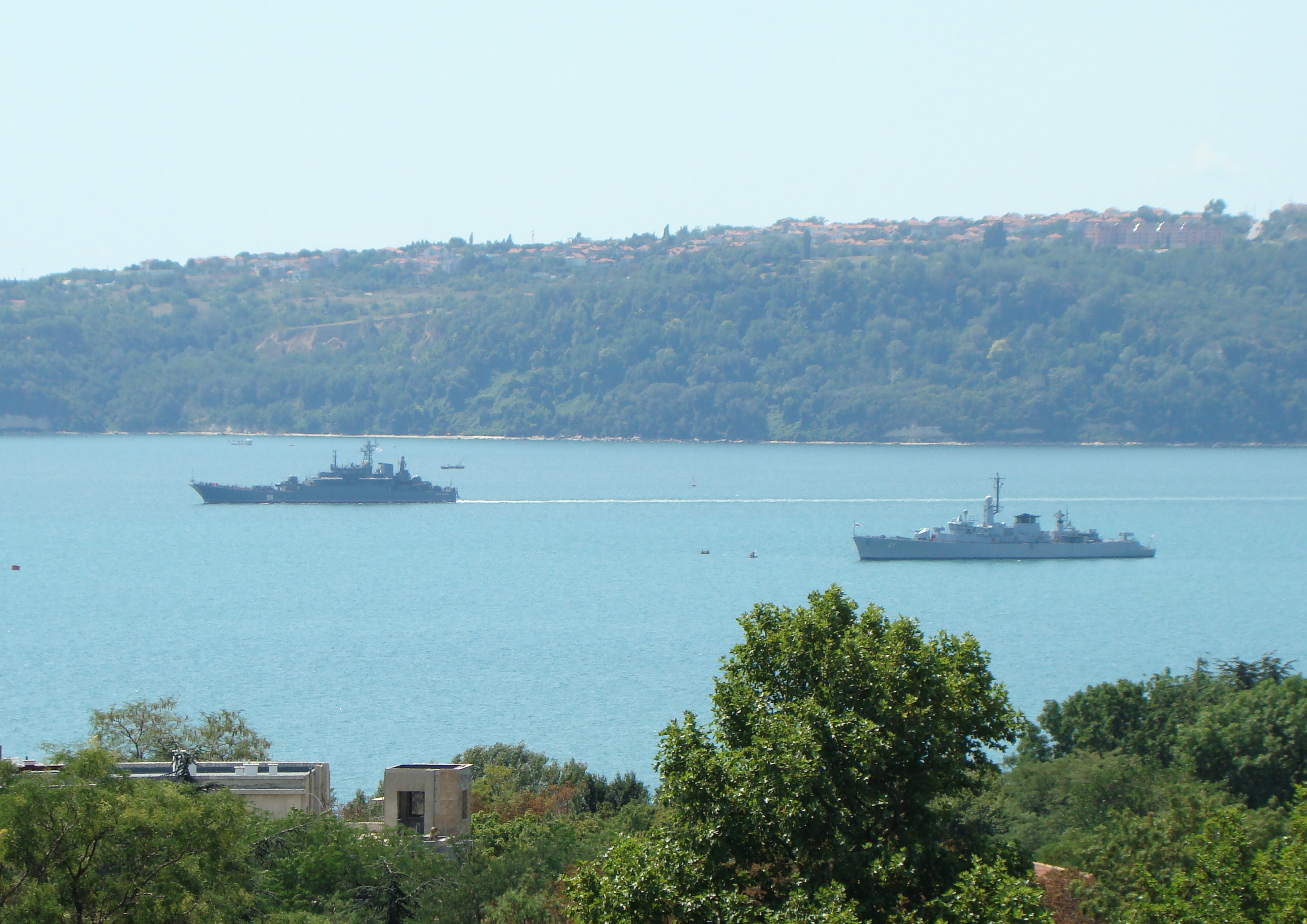
The Bulgarian fleet in Varna

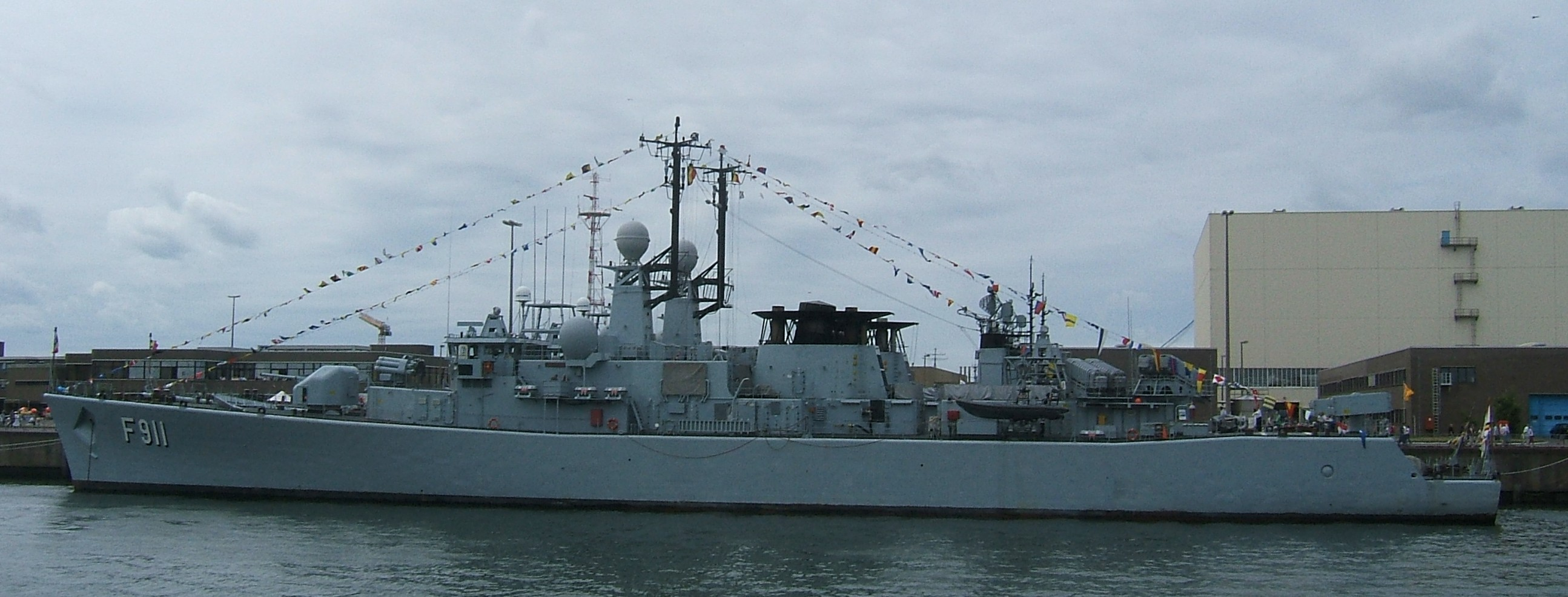
The Wielingen-class frigate ex-Westdiep, now BGS Gordi

- Naval Forces Command, Varna
  - Naval Forces Staff (Командване на Военноморските сили)
    - Commander of the Naval Forces - Rear admiral
    - Deputy Commander of the Naval Forces - Flotilla admiral
    - Chief of Staff of the Naval Forces - Captain 1st rank
    - Deputy Chief of the Naval Staff (Operations) - Captain 1st rank
    - Deputy Chief of the Naval Staff (Resources) - Captain 1st rank
  - Naval Operations Center (Морски оперативен център)
  - Coastal Fundamental System for CIS Support (Брегова опорна система за комуникационно-информационна поддръжка), Varna
  - Coastal Information Detachment (Брегови информационен отряд)
  - Independent Electronic Surveillance Detachment (Отделен отряд за електронно разузнаване), Tsarevo
  - Combat and Support Ships Flotilla (Флотилия бойни и спомагателни кораби), Varna - Flotilla Admiral
    - Combat and Support Ships Flotilla Staff (Командване и щаб)
    - Command, Control and Communications Units (формирования, осигуряващи командване, управление и комуникации)
    - 1st Patrol Ships Division (1-ви Дивизион патрулни кораби), BL Varna
    - 3rd Mine Counter-Measure Ships Division (3-ти дивизион противоминни кораби), BL Varna
    - 18th Support Purpose Ships Division (18-ти дивизион кораби със спомагателно назначение), BL Varna
    - Basing Location Varna (Пункт за базиране Варна)
      - Harbour boats and Floating and Equipment Detachment BLV (отряд плаващи средства и съоръжения)
    - 4th Patrol Ships Division (4-ти Дивизион патрулни кораби), BL Atiya
    - 6th Mine Counter-Measure Ships Division (6-ти дивизион противоминни кораби), BL Atiya
    - 96th Support Purpose Ships Division (96-ти дивизион кораби със спомагателно назначение), BL Atiya
    - Basing Location Atiya (Пункт за базиране Атия)
      - Harbour boats and Floating and Equipment Detachment BLA (отряд плаващи средства и съоръжения)
    - Repair and Maintenance Center and Weapons and Equipment Storage (ремонтна работилница и склад за въоръжение и техника)
    - 2nd Coastal Anti-Ship Missile and Artillery Battalion (Брегови ракетно-артилерийски дивизион), near Varna
  - Independent Naval Helicopter Air Base "Chayka" (Отделна морска вертолетна авиобаза "Чайка"), Varna
  - Naval Special Reconnaissance Detachment (Морски специален разузнавателен отряд), Varna, co-located with the air base
  - Hydrographical Service of the Naval Forces (Хидрографска служба на ВМС)
  - Equipment Storage Base of the Naval Forces (База за съхранение на технически имущества), near Varna
  - Military Police Company of the Naval Forces Command (Рота „Военна полиция“), Varna
  - Representative Naval Orchestra (Представителен духов оркестър), Varna
  - other support units (осигуряващи формирования)

A "Division" is the equivalent of land forces battalion or air force squadron as the Bulgarian Navy follows the Russian naval tradition, according to which an "Operational Squadron" or "Оперативная эскадра" is a temporary formation, an equivalent of a land forces division and in modern times a "Squadron" of the Russian Navy is an equivalent of a land forces corps.

According to the reform plans envisioned in the White Paper on Defence 2010, the two naval bases would be merged into one with two base facilities in Varna and Burgas. The manpower of the Navy would account to about 3,400 seamen. The ordered Eurocopter AS565 MB Panther helicopters were reduced from six to three units. Between 2011 and 2020 the naval "Longterm Investment Plan" should come into action, providing the sea arm of the Bulgarian military with modernised ships and new equipment.

== Ships ==
The list does not include vessels assigned to the border police. The Bulgarian Navy has inherited the Soviet tradition of "board numbers" (Bulgarian: бордови номер, romanized: bordovi nomer), which means that unlike pennant numbers and hull classification symbols, they do not identify uniquely a vessel during its lifetime – for example, a ship can change numbers when it's transferred to another unit, and new ships reuse the numbers of old ones in the same unit.

In November 2020, the Bulgarian Ministry of Defense signed a contract with Lürssen Germany to build two multi mission patrol vessels for the Bulgarian Navy. The ships are to be built by the Bulgarian MTG Dolphin shipyard in Varna and delivered in 2025 and 2026 with the €503M price also including training. Based on Darussalam-class offshore patrol vessel the ships will be armed with an OTO Melara 76 mm, RBS 15, MICA VL, Rheinmetall Oerlikon Millennium, Multi Ammunition Softkill System and Leonardo A.244/S torpedoes. The first ship, Hrabri, was launched on August 4, 2023. The second ship, Smeli, was launched on December 12, 2024.

Class	Picture	In service	Type	Ship	Displacement	Origin	Homeport	Notes
Frigates (6)
Wielingen		3	Multi-role frigate	Drazki (41) (Дръзки - Daring)	2,283 tonnes	Belgium	Atia 4th Patrol Ships Division	
Wielingen		3	Multi-role frigate	Verni (42) (Верни - Loyal)	2,283 tonnes	Belgium	Atia 4th Patrol Ships Division	
Wielingen		3	Multi-role frigate	Gordi (43) (Горди - Proud)	2,283 tonnes	Belgium	Atia 4th Patrol Ships Division	
Koni		1	Anti-submarine frigate (ASW)	Smeli (11) (Smeli - Brave)	1,440 tonnes	Soviet Union	Varna 1st Patrol Ships Division	
MMPV 90		2	Multi-role frigate	Hrabri (12) (Храбри - Courageous)	2,300 tonnes	Germany; Bulgaria	Varna 1st Patrol Ships Division	Hrabri went into shakedown testing on November 10, 2025 and was commissioned into the Navy on December 8, 2025.
MMPV 90		2	Multi-role frigate	Smeli (13) (Смели - Brave)	2,300 tonnes	Germany; Bulgaria	Varna 1st Patrol Ships Division	Hrabri went into shakedown testing on November 10, 2025 and was commissioned into the Navy on December 8, 2025.
Corvettes / Patrol vessels (3)
Tarantul		1	Fast patrol craft / Missile corvette	Malniya (101) (Мълния - Lightning)	549 tonnes	Soviet Union	Atia 4th Patrol Ships Division	
Pauk		2	Patrol craft torpedo / ASW corvette	Reshitelni (13) (Решителни - Decisive)	589 tonnes	Soviet Union	Varna 1st Patrol Ships Division	
Pauk		2	Patrol craft torpedo / ASW corvette	Bodri (14) (Бодри - Brisk)	589 tonnes	Soviet Union	Varna 1st Patrol Ships Division	
Mine countermeasures vessels 10+6
Tripartite		3	Minehunter Offshore	Tsibar (32) (Цибър)	605 tonnes	Belgium	Varna 3rd Mine Counter-Measure Division	ex-Belgian Myosotis
Tripartite		3	Minehunter Offshore	Mesta (31)	605 tonnes	Netherlands	Varna 3rd Mine Counter-Measure Division	ex-Dutch Maassluis
Tripartite		3	Minehunter Offshore	Struma (33)	605 tonnes	Netherlands	Varna 3rd Mine Counter-Measure Division	ex-Dutch Hellevoetsluis
Tripartite		1+(3)	Minehunter Offshore	Briz (61) ex-Bellis	605 tonnes	Belgium	Atia 6th Mine Counter-Measure Division	1+3 to be donated by Belgium
Tripartite		1+(3)	Minehunter Offshore	ex-Crocus	605 tonnes	Belgium	Atia 6th Mine Counter-Measure Division	1+3 to be donated by Belgium
Tripartite		1+(3)	Minehunter Offshore	ex-Lobelia	605 tonnes	Belgium	Atia 6th Mine Counter-Measure Division	1+3 to be donated by Belgium
Tripartite		1+(3)	Minehunter Offshore	ex-Primula	605 tonnes	Belgium	Atia 6th Mine Counter-Measure Division	1+3 to be donated by Belgium
Tripartite		(3)	Minehunter Offshore	ex-Schiedam	605 tonnes	Netherlands	TBD	3 to be donated by the Netherlands in 2027-2028
Tripartite		(3)	Minehunter Offshore	ex-Zierikzee	605 tonnes	Netherlands	TBD	3 to be donated by the Netherlands in 2027-2028
Tripartite		(3)	Minehunter Offshore	ex-Willemstad	605 tonnes	Netherlands	TBD	3 to be donated by the Netherlands in 2027-2028
Olya		4	MinesweeperInshore	Kapitan-Leytenant Kiril Minkov (53)	61 tonnes	Soviet Union	Varna 3rd Mine Counter-Measure Division	
Olya		4	MinesweeperInshore	Balik (54)	61 tonnes	Soviet Union	Varna 3rd Mine Counter-Measure Division	
Olya		4	MinesweeperInshore	Kapitan Leytenant Evstati Vinarov (55)	61 tonnes	Soviet Union	Varna 3rd Mine Counter-Measure Division	
Olya		4	MinesweeperInshore	Kapitan Parvi Rang Dimitar Paskalev (56)	61 tonnes	Soviet Union	Varna 3rd Mine Counter-Measure Division	
Sonya-class minesweeper		2	Minehunter Offshore	Briz (61) (Бриз - Sea breeze) decommisioned 1 december 2025	450 tonnes	Soviet Union	Atia 6th Mine Counter-Measure Division	To be replaced by Tripartite
Sonya-class minesweeper		2	Minehunter Offshore	Shkval (62) (Шквал - Squall)	450 tonnes	Soviet Union	Atia 6th Mine Counter-Measure Division	To be replaced by Tripartite
Sonya-class minesweeper		2	Minehunter Offshore	Priboi (63) (Прибой - Breaking wave)	450 tonnes	Soviet Union	Atia 6th Mine Counter-Measure Division	To be replaced by Tripartite
Landing craft (2)
Vydra	—	2	LCM	Project 106K-1 Project 106K-2	—	Soviet Union	—	
Support ships (16)
Project 160 multi-purpose cutter	—	5	Cutter	Hull number 121	—	Bulgaria	Varna 18th Support Ships Division	
Project 160 multi-purpose cutter	—	5	Cutter	Hull number 215	—	Bulgaria	Varna 18th Support Ships Division	
Project 160 multi-purpose cutter	—	5	Cutter	Hull number 216	—	Bulgaria	Varna 18th Support Ships Division	
Project 160 multi-purpose cutter	—	5	Cutter	Hull number 312	—	Bulgaria	Atia 96th Support Ships Division	
Project 160 multi-purpose cutter	—	5	Cutter	Hull number 313	—	Bulgaria	Atia 96th Support Ships Division	
Project 245 cutter	—	2	Cutter	Kapita Vtori Rang Nikola Furnadzhiev (223)	—	Bulgaria	Varna 18th Support Ships Division	
Project 245 cutter	—	2	Cutter	Hull number 323	—	Bulgaria	Atia 96th Support Ships Division	
Project 612 survey cutter	—	2	Cutter	Kapitan Parvi Rang Boris Rogev (231)	—	Bulgaria	Varna 18th Support Ships Division	
Project 612 survey cutter	—	2	Cutter	Hull number 331	—	Bulgaria	Atia 96th Support Ships Division	
Project 250 fireboat	—	1	Fireboat	Aheloy (321) (Ахелой)	—	Bulgaria	Atia 96th Support Ships Division	
Project 650 tanker	—	2	Tanker	Balchik (203) (Балчик)	—	Bulgaria	Varna 18th Support Ships Division	
Project 650 tanker	—	2	Tanker	Akin (303) (Акин)	—	Bulgaria	Atia 96th Support Ships Division	
—	—	1	Tugboat	Hadzhi Dimitar (211)	—	Bulgaria	Varna 18th Support Ships Division	
—	—	1	Tugboat	Stefan Karadzha (410)	—	Bulgaria	Atia 96th Support Ships Division	
Type 1799 degaussing ship		1	Degaussing ship	Kapitan I rang Dimitar Dobrev (206) (after Dimitar Dobrev)	—	Poland	Varna 18th Support Ships Division	
—		1	Rescue vessel	Proteo (224) (Протео)	—	Italy	Varna 18th Support Ships Division	ex-Italian А 5310 Proteo
Training ships (1)
—	—	1	Training ship	Hull number 421	—	Bulgaria	Varna Naval academy "N.Y. Vaptsarov"	
Remotely operated vehicles
Double Eagle Mark III		—	Unmanned underwater vehicle	—	—	Sweden	—	Used in the disposal of naval mines.

== Naval aviation ==
Insignia of the Chayka Naval Air Base

Name	Image	In service	Origin	Type	Details
Eurocopter AS565 Panther		2	France	ASW / Maritime patrol	
Eurocopter AS365 Dauphin		1	France	Multirole helicopter	Delivered in late 2019

=== Accidents ===
On 9 June 2017 during a training mission of artillery fire against surface targets as a part of the "Black Sea-2017" exercise of the Bulgarian Navy, a Panther helicopter crashed in the water, killing the commander and injuring the other two officers on board. The helicopter's main rotor made contact with the fore flagpole of the frigate BGS-41 Drazki, after which it crashed into the sea. The crew commander suffered heavy injuries upon the crash, causing his death. The other two crew members suffered minor injuries, mainly by inhaling gases caused after the crash.) The helicopter has been written off and the remaining two units have been grounded for a month on 10 June. After the helicopter struck the flagpole it became increasingly unstable and the commander, Capt. Georgi Anastasov, decided to turn back to the frigate and attempt an emergency landing in the water nearby, maximizing the chances for a rapid emergency recovery by the surface ships nearby. According to the Ministry of Defence and Navy officials his actions have directly contributed to the saving of the other two officers on board with only minor injuries, for his efforts he has been posthumously promoted to Major.

=== Storage ===
3 Mil Mi-14 (stored in non-airworthy condition)

== Equipment ==
Type	Image	Origin	Type
SSM systems
Exocet		France	Anti-ship missile
P-15MC Termit		Soviet Union	Anti-ship missile
SAM systems
SA-N-4		Soviet Union	Surface-to-air missile
SA-N-5		Soviet Union	MANPADS
SA-14		Soviet Union	MANPADS
RIM-7 Sea Sparrow		United States	Surface-to-air missile
CIWS
AK-230		Soviet Union	30mm close in weapon system
AK-630M		Soviet Union	30mm close in weapon system
Naval guns
AK-176M		Soviet Union	76mm naval gun
AK-726		Soviet Union	76mm naval gun
Creusot-Loire 100mm Naval Gun		France	100mm naval gun
ASW
RBU-1200		Soviet Union	ASW rocket launcher
RBU-6000		Soviet Union	ASW rocket launcher
Coastal defence systems
4K51 Rubezh		Soviet Union	Coastal defence
Future acquisition
RBS-15 Mk3		Sweden	Anti-ship missile
Naval Strike Missile		Norway United States	Coastal defense system
VL MICA		France	Vertical launched surface-to-air missile
Oerlikon Millennium Gun		Germany	35mm close in weapon system
Oto Melara 76mm Super Rapid		Italy	76mm naval gun

== Ranks ==
=== Commissioned officer ranks ===
The rank insignia of commissioned officers.

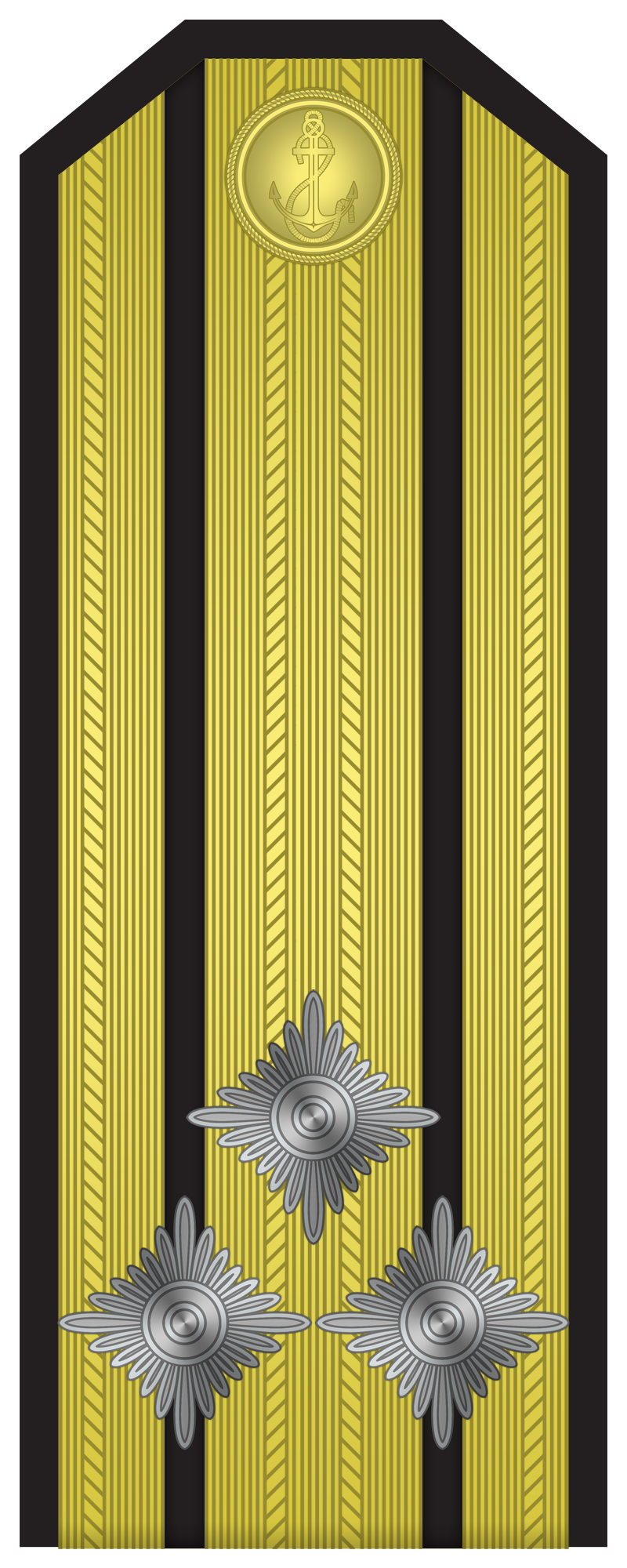
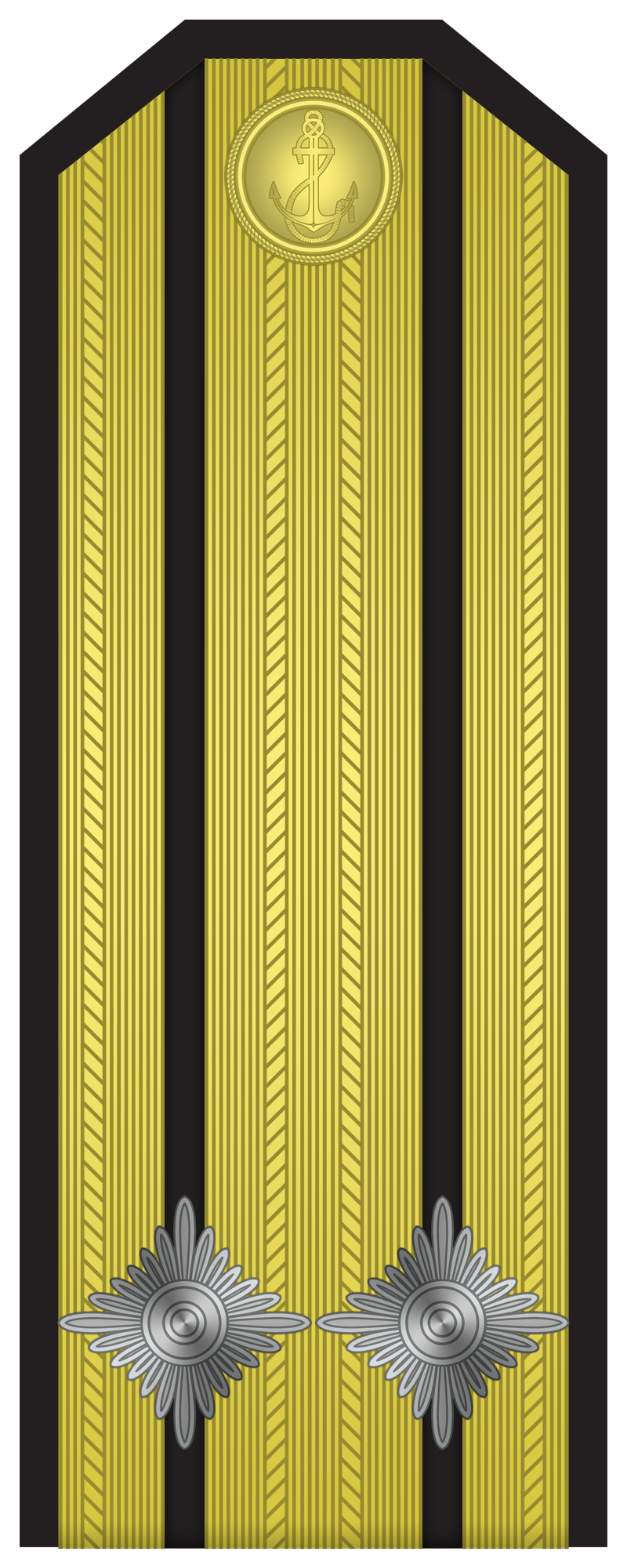
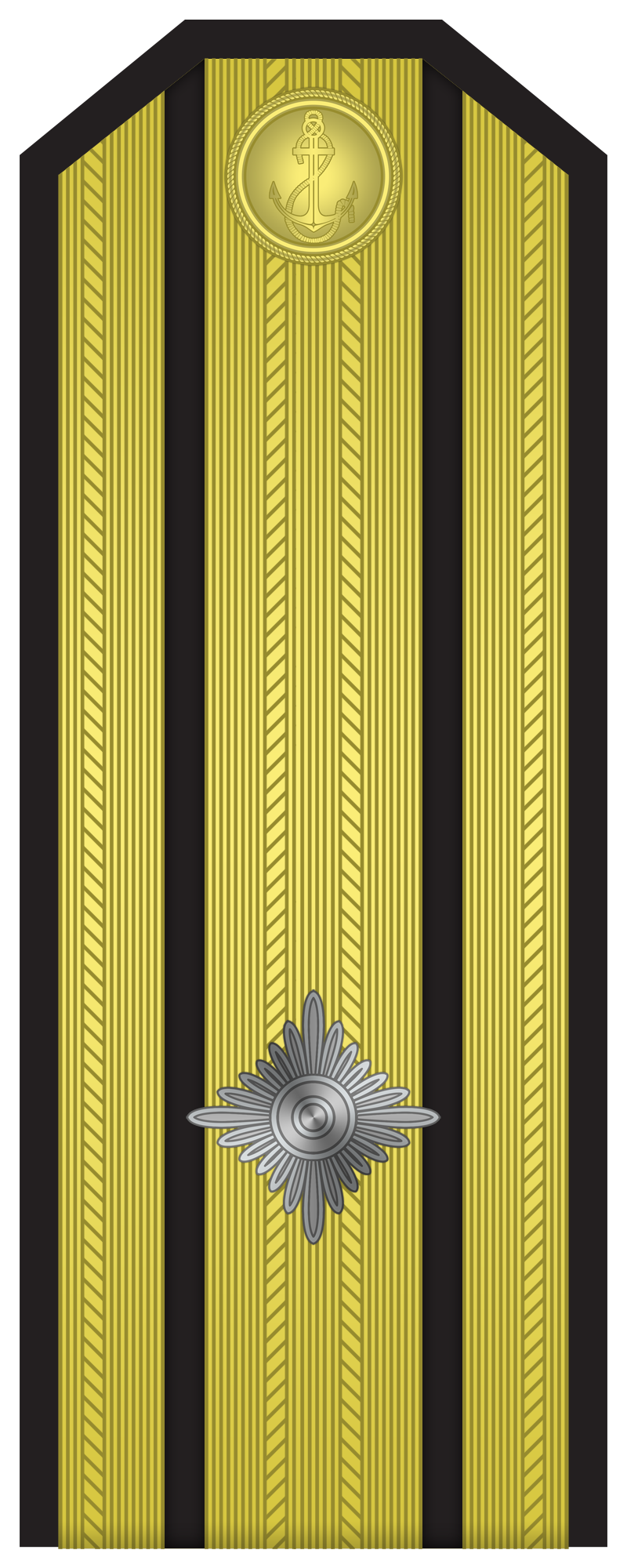
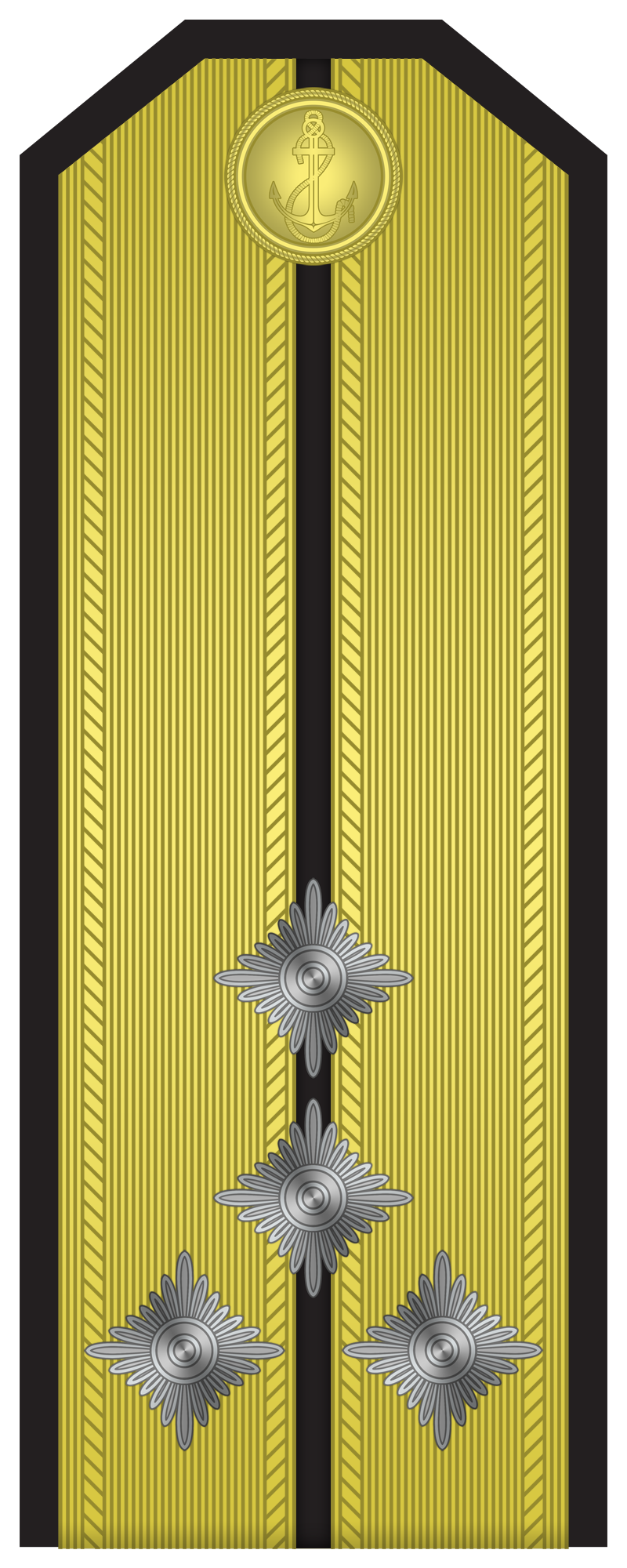
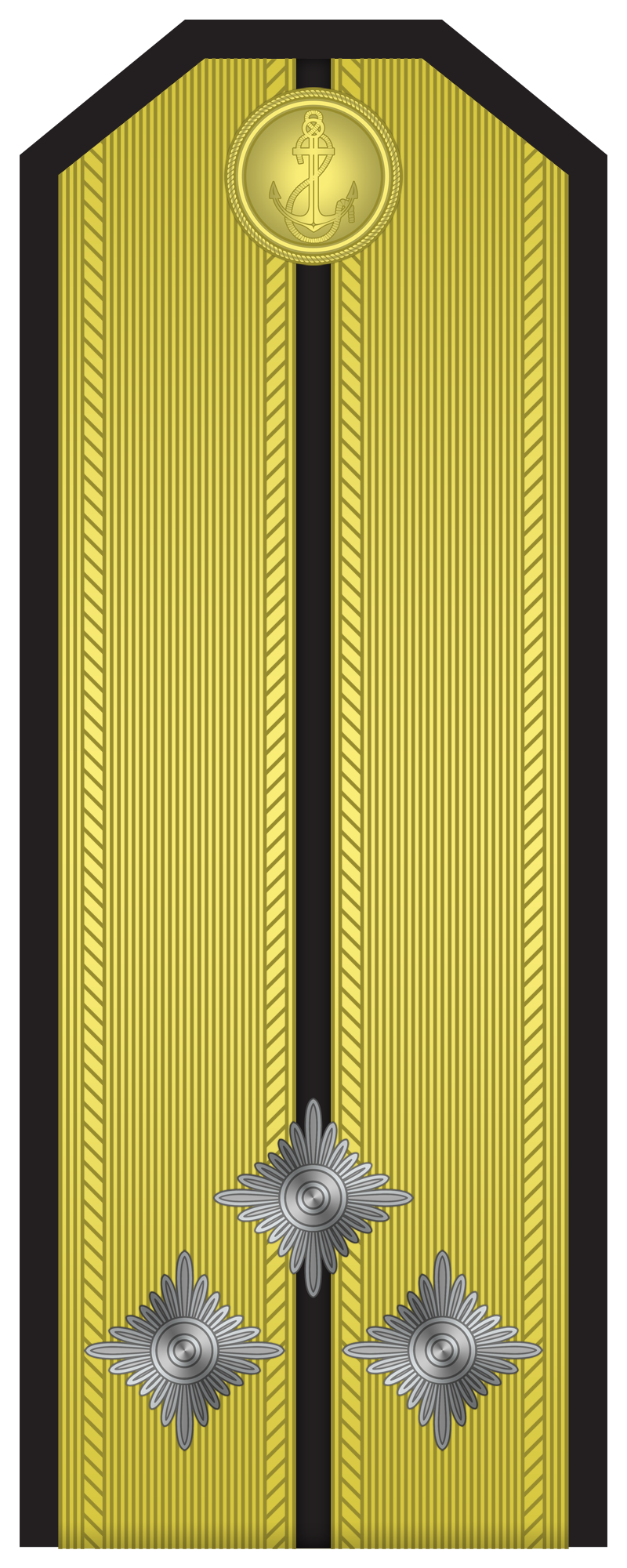
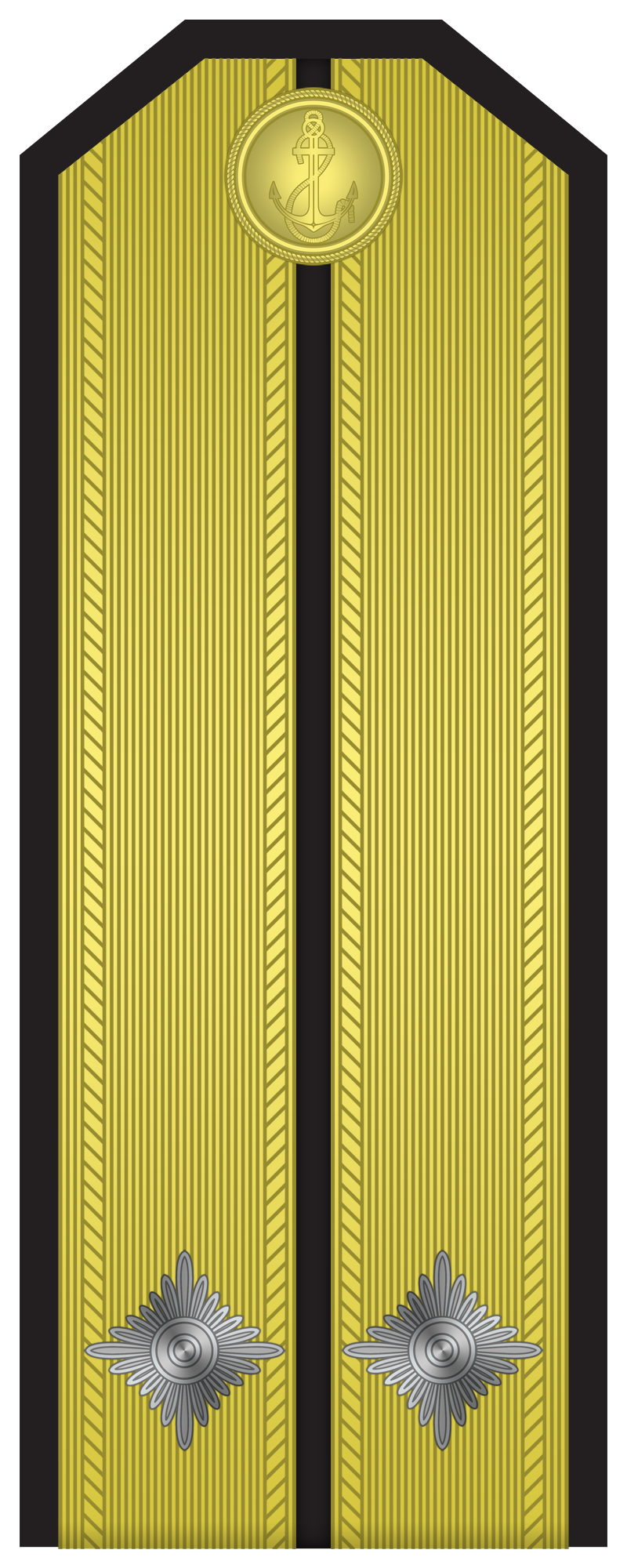
NATO code	OF-10	OF-9	OF-8	OF-7	OF-6	OF-5	OF-4	OF-3	OF-2	OF-1
Bulgarian Navy
Bulgarian Navy		Адмирал; Admiral	Вицеадмирал; Vitseadmiral	Контраадмирал; Kontraadmiral	Флотилен адмирал Flotilen admiral	Капитан I ранг Kapitan I rang	Капитан II ранг Kapitan II rang	Капитан III ранг Kapitan III rang	Капитан-лейтенант; Kapitan-leytenant	Старши лейтенант Starshi leĭtenant	Лейтенант; Leytenant

=== Other ranks ===
The rank insignia of non-commissioned officers and enlisted personnel.

NATO code	OR-9	OR-8	OR-7	OR-6	OR-5	OR-4	OR-3	OR-2	OR-1
Bulgarian Navy
Bulgarian Navy	Офицерски кандидат Ofitserski kandidat	Мичман; Mičman	Главен старшина Glaven starshina	Старшина 1 степен Starshina 1 stepen	Старшина 2 степен Starshina 2 stepen	Старши матрос Starshi matros	Матрос; Matros

== Bibliography ==
- Andreev, J. & Boshniakov, S. (July 1997). "L'aviation navale bulgare (récit complete)" [Bulgarian Naval Aviation]. Avions: Toute l'aéronautique et son histoire (in French) (52): 38–42. ISSN 1243-8650.
- Todorov, Ilia (1996). "Fifty Years of the Bulgarian Navy". Warship International. XXXIII (1): 16–44. ISSN 0043-0374.
