= Battle of Kaliakra =

Battle of Kaliakra may refer to one of two following battles that took place off Cape Kaliakra, in modern Bulgaria:

- Battle of Cape Kaliakra (1791), between the Ottomans and the Russians
- Battle of Kaliakra (1912), between the Bulgarians and Ottomans
