= Action of 6 December 1941 =

- Part of the Black Sea campaigns (1941–1944)
Date	6 December 1941
Location	Cape Emine, 20 miles off Varna, Bulgaria
Result	Bulgarian victory

Belligerents
Bulgaria	Soviet Union

Commanders and leaders
Unknown	(Soviet Union) Captain Gricenko †

Strength
2 submarine chasers supported by aircraft	1 submarine

Casualties and losses
None	1 submarine sunk 38 killed

The action of 6 December 1941 was a confrontation between the Bulgarian and Soviet navies in the Black Sea during World War II, taking place near the Bulgarian coast at Cape Emine.

== Background ==
When the Axis invasion of the Soviet Union commenced in June 1941, Bulgaria did not declare war on the Soviet Union, nor did it make any contribution to the land invasion. The country however did offer naval support to the Axis, allowing Axis warships to use Bulgarian ports and even use three of its torpedo boats (including Drazki) to escort Romanian warships as they laid mines along the Bulgarian coast in October 1941. These actions made the Bulgarian coast a target for the Soviet Black Sea Fleet.

== The engagement ==
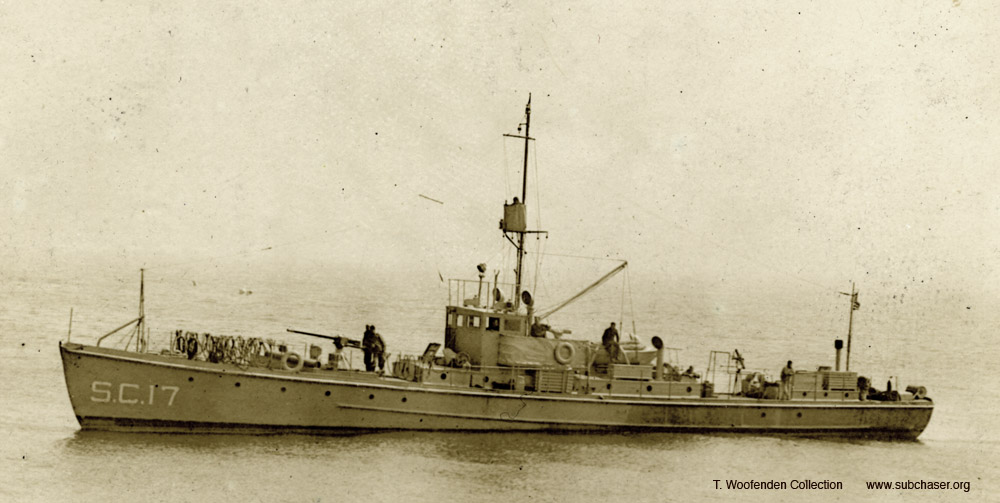
The Bulgarian submarine chasers were of the American SC-1 type.

On 1 December 1941, several Soviet submarines, including the Shchuka-class Shch-204 (Captain Gricenko), were sent on a patrol along the Axis coastline. On 6 December, Shch-204 was spotted near Cape Emine, 20 miles off Varna, by Bulgarian Arado Ar 196 aircraft. The Bulgarian submarine chasers Belomorets and Chernomorets soon arrived at the scene and together with the aircraft attacked the Soviet submarine with depth charges, soon sinking her with all hands (Shchuka-class submarines had a crew of 38).

== Aftermath ==
The result of this engagement was the most significant Bulgarian naval victory of the Second World War, and Shch-204 was the only Allied submarine sunk by the Bulgarian Navy. Through this victory, the Bulgarian Navy demonstrated its availability and capability of working together with its German and Romanian counterparts in the Black Sea for the defence of Axis coastlines and convoys.

== Alternate account ==
Non-Bulgarian sources describe the loss of Shch-204 due to a mine on the same day (6 December 1941). According to the Russian author M. Morozov, the submarine chasers were located in Burges at the time of the attack, for work on engines. An alternate version of the sinking due to a Romanian mine is also dismissed. Russian sources blame the loss to a German He 59 seaplane or to a Bulgarian Ar 196 seaplane.
