= Poti-class corvette =

Ship class

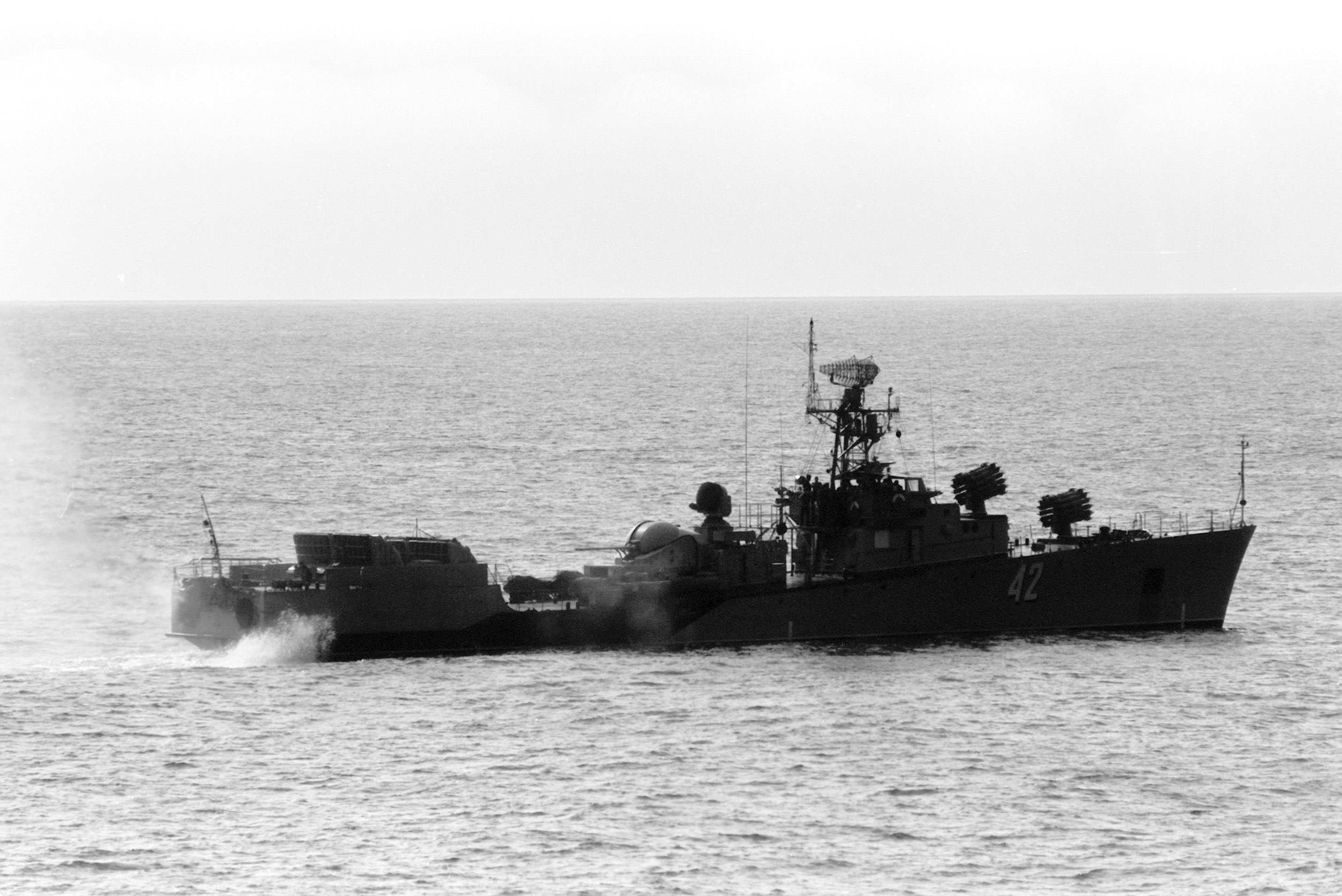
- Bulgarian Navy Poti-class corvette Bditelni in 1987

Class overview
- Name: Poti class
- Operators: Soviet Navy; Bulgarian Navy; Romanian Naval Forces
- Preceded by: Kronshtadt-class submarine chaser
- Succeeded by: Pauk class
- Built: 1960–1968
- In service: 1960–2005
- Completed: 66

General characteristics
- Type: Anti-submarine corvette
- Displacement: 508 tonnes (500 long tons) standard; 589 t (580 long tons) full load
- Length: 59.4 m (194 ft 11 in)
- Beam: 7.9 m (25 ft 11 in)
- Draught: 2.0 m (6 ft 7 in)
- Propulsion: 2 shaft CODAG, 2 gas turbines 22,371 kW (30,000 shp) and 2 M503A diesels 5,966 kW (8,000 bhp)
- Speed: 38 knots (70 km/h; 44 mph)
- Range: 4,500 nmi (8,300 km; 5,200 mi) at 10 knots (19 km/h; 12 mph); 520 nmi (960 km; 600 mi) at 37 knots (69 km/h; 43 mph)
- Complement: 80
- Sensors & processing systems: Radar: Strut Curve, Muff Comb, Don 2; Sonar: High frequency Herkules hull mounted and Bronza dipping sonar
- Armament: 1 × twin 57 mm (2.2 in) guns; 2 × RBU-6000 anti submarine rocket launchers (RBU-2500 in Romanian and early Soviet ships); 1 × quad 406 mm (16 in) anti-submarine torpedo tubes; some ships have 1 × twin 533 mm (21 in) torpedo tubes)

The Poti class was the NATO reporting name for a group of anti-submarine warfare (ASW) corvettes built for the Soviet Navy. The Soviet designation was Project 204 small anti-submarine ships. These ships were the first Soviet warships powered by gas turbine engines; two propellers were mounted in tunnels to give a very shallow draught. A twin 57 mm (2 in) gun mounting provided self-defence. Three ships of the class were exported to Romania and six to Bulgaria during the Cold War. By 2008, all ships of the class were no longer extant.

== Design and description ==
Designated Maly Protivo Lodochny Korabl (Russian: Small Anti-submarine Ship) by the Soviet Navy, Project 204 (NATO reporting name Poti class) was the first class of corvettes not based on the traditional World War II anti-submarine (ASW) design constructed by the Soviets. The Poti class reversed a trend of smaller ships, being larger than the preceding Kronshtadt and SO1 classes, which allowed the vessels to mount larger guns. The Poti class were also the first large Soviet warships to incorporate gas turbines and were the fastest ASW warships ever constructed by them.

Corvettes of Poti class measured 59.4 metres (194 ft 11 in) long with a beam of 7.9 m (25 ft 11 in) and a draught of 2.0 m (6 ft 7 in). They had a standard displacement of 508 tonnes (500 long tons) and 589 t (580 long tons) fully loaded. The ships were powered by a two shaft combined diesel and gas propulsion system consisting of two M-2 gas turbines creating 22,000 kilowatts (30,000 shp) and two M503A diesel engines creating 6,000 kW (8,000 bhp). The two propellers were mounted in thrust tubes which extended the length of the prop. The gas turbines exhausted through ports in the transom and were also used to power air compressors which exhausted into the thrust tubes to create extra thrust. The power plant was similar to those found in the Mirka class. This gave the ships a maximum speed of 38 knots (70 km/h; 44 mph) and a range of 4,500 nautical miles (8,300 km; 5,200 mi) at 10 knots (19 km/h; 12 mph) or 520 nmi (960 km; 600 mi) at 37 knots (69 km/h; 43 mph).

In Soviet service, the corvettes were armed with a single turret mounted forward comprising twin 57-millimetre (2.2 in)/80 dual-purpose guns. (Note: The /80 after the calibre denotes the length of the gun. This means that the length of the gun barrel is 80 times the bore diameter.) Some of the earlier Soviet ships had open mounts, with later units having closed units. The guns had 85 degree elevation and could fire a 2.8-kilogram (6.2 lb) shell to a range of 6 kilometres (3.7 mi) up to 120 rounds per minute. They were also equipped with either twin-mounted or quad-mounted 406 mm (16 in) torpedo tubes for Soviet Type 40 ASW torpedoes. The torpedoes had active/passive homing up to 8 nmi (15 km; 9.2 mi) and had a speed of 40 knots (74 km/h; 46 mph) and carried a 100–150 kg (220–330 lb) warhead. The first units constructed mounted two 16-tubed RBU-2500 ASW rocket launchers, with later vessels receiving two 12-tubed RBU-6000 ASW models.

The Soviet Poti class were equipped with Don 2 surface search radar, Strut Curve air search radar, Muff Cobb fire control radar. (Note: Gardiner, Chumbley & Budzbon state the vessels also mounted Spin Through radar.) They also had one hull-mounted high-frequency Herkules sonar and one Hormone dipping sonar. For electronic countermeasures, the corvettes had two Watch Dog units. The corvettes had a complement of 80 officers and ratings in Soviet service. (Note: Couhat has a complement of 40.)

=== Ships ===
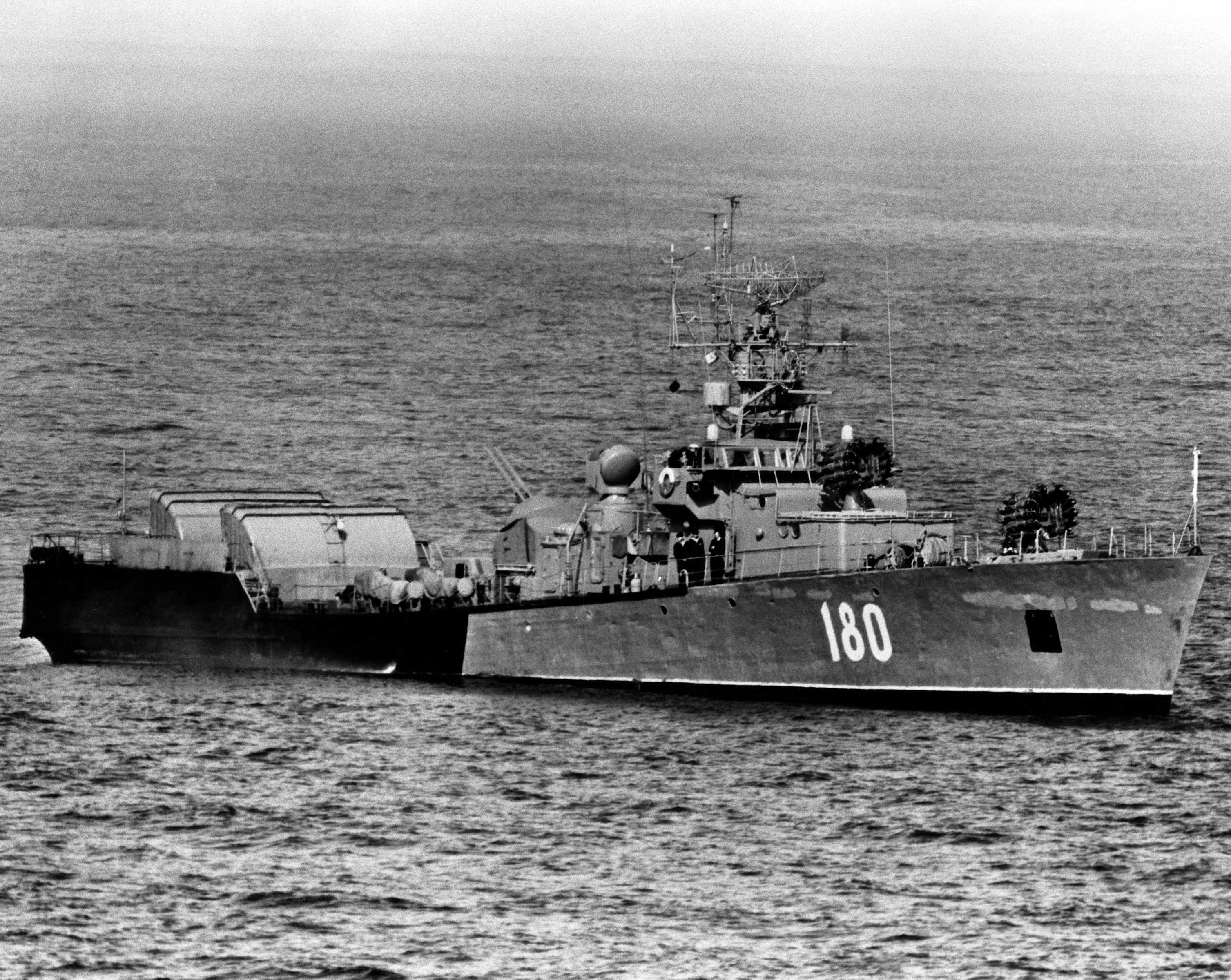
Soviet Poti-class corvette in 1983

A total of 66 ships were built between 1960 and 1968. In the Soviet Union the Poti-class corvettes were decommissioned by the late 1980s and replaced in service by the Pauk-class corvettes. Builders were:

- Kerch yard 24 ships
- Zelenodolsk yard : 32 ships
- Khabarovsk yard: 8 ships

== Export ==
=== Bulgaria ===
Following World War II, Bulgaria entered the Soviet Union's sphere of influence. By the 1950s, the Bulgarian military had been re-organised along Soviet lines and equipped with Soviet armaments. In 1955, Bulgaria acquired Kronstahdt-class submarine chasers to outfit their ASW forces. Bulgaria required replacements for these ships as they became obsolete and six Poti-class ships were transferred between 1975 and 1990 to the Bulgarian Navy. The former Soviet numbers of most of the individual ships are not known, but it is known that MPK-59, MPK-77 and MPK-109 were among the ships given to Bulgaria. By 2008, all of Bulgaria's Poti-class corvettes had been discarded.

Pennant	Name	Launched	Transferred	Commissioned	Fate
44 (ex-14, 33)	Khrabri	MPK-?	1960s	1986	Decommissioned in 2005, sold for scrapping
45 (ex-44, 34)	Strogi	MPK-?	1960s	1990	Decommissioned in 1993, sold for scrapping in Turkey 1997.
46 (ex-15, 35)	Bezstrashni	MPK-?	1960s	1990	Gas turbines removed in 1994. Decommissioned in 2005, sold for scrapping
41	Letjashhi	MPK-?	1960s	December 1975	Decommissioned in 2005, sold for scrapping
42	Bditelni	MPK-?	1960s	December 1975	Decommissioned in 2005, sold for scrapping
43	Naporisti	MPK-148	1962	December 1975	Decommissioned in 1993, sank during towing to Turkey in 1997

=== Romania ===
Post World War II, Romania fell into the Soviet Union's sphere of influence and joined the Warsaw Pact. However, by the beginning of 1964 Romania began to diverge from Soviet direction and as a result, saw limited military support afterwards, with the rift between the two countries widening in 1968 after the invasion of Czechoslovakia. Three ships were transferred to the Romanian Navy in 1970. The Romanian ships carried the older RBU-2500 ASW rocket launchers and twin 533 mm (21 in) torpedo tubes using Soviet Type 53 torpedoes. All three ships were constructed at Zelenodolsk and were transferred upon completion. The former Soviet numbers of the individual ships are not known, but it is known that MPK-106 and MPK-125 were among the ships given to Romania.

Pennant	Name	Soviet name	Launched	Transferred	Fate
31	Contraamiral Nicolae Cristescu	MPK-?	5 December 1968	1970	Decommissioned after 1992
32	Contraamiral Nicolae Negru	MPK-?	1 April 1969	1970	Decommissioned after 1992
33	Contraamiral Irimescu	MPK-?	20 October 1969	1970	Decommissioned after 1992

== See also ==
- List of ships of the Soviet Navy
- List of ships of Russia by project number
