= Dimitar Dobrev (officer) =

Bulgarian naval officer

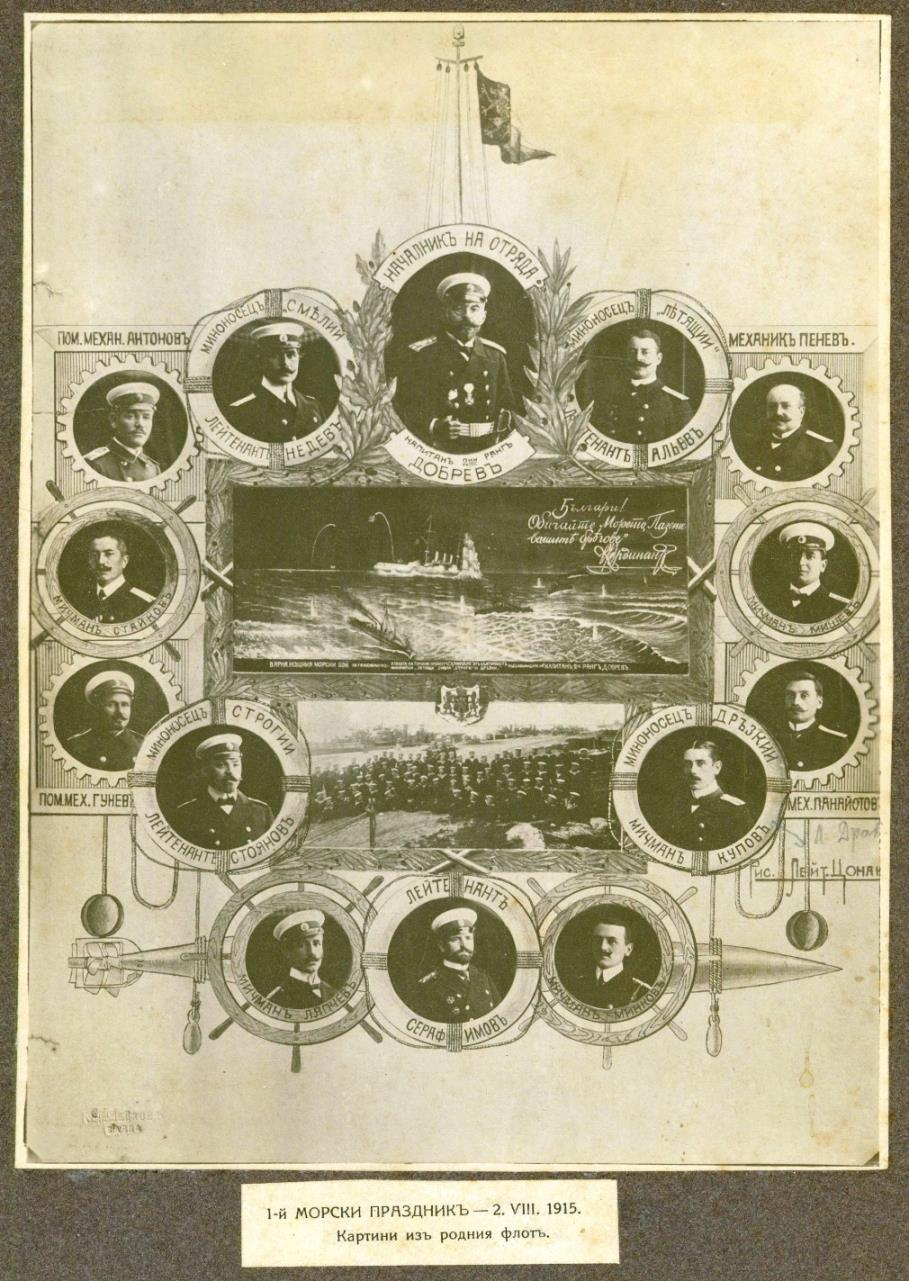
- Crew members of Daring, Brave, Flying and Strict; Captain Dobrev is at the top-center
- Born: February 12, 1868; Ruse, Danube Vilayet, Ottoman Empire
- Died: April 11, 1944 (aged 76); Tarnovo, Veliko Tarnovo Province, Bulgaria
- Military career
- Allegiance: Principality of Bulgaria; Russian Empire; Kingdom of Bulgaria
- Branch: Bulgarian Land Forces; Bulgarian Navy; Russian Imperial Navy
- Service years: 1885 – 1914
- Conflicts: Serbo-Bulgarian War; Russo-Japanese War; Battle of Tsushima; First Balkan War; Bulgarian front; Battle of Kaliakra; Second Balkan War

Captain 1st rank Dimitar Dobrev Dobrev was a Bulgarian naval officer. He participated in the Serbo-Bulgarian War, Russo-Japanese War, First Balkan War and the Second Balkan War.

== Biography ==
=== Education ===
In 1883 he graduated from a real school (real gymnasium) in Moscow.

In 1883 he was admitted to the Military School in Sofia, where he graduated.

He passed the examinations in the Provisional Course for Naval Officers in March 1893 and May 1895, respectively, with which he acquired the qualification of naval officer.

In the period 1896 - 1897 Dobrev studied and graduated from the Torpedo officer class at the Royal and Imperial Naval School in Pula, Austria-Hungary.

In 1903, Lieutenant Dobrev was enlisted in the Artillery Officer Class of the Russian Imperial Navy in Kronstadt, graduating the following year.

=== Military career ===
As a volunteer with the rank of yunker (cadet), he participated in the Serbo-Bulgarian War in the ranks of the 1st Sofia Infantry Regiment, commanding a half-company in the fighting at Bregovitsa and Malovo on November 3. He was later put in command of the 11th company of the regiment and participated in the skirmish at Gurgulyat, for which he was awarded the Soldier Cross of Bravery, IV grade. After the war he returned to the Military School and continued his education. While he was still a cadet, he took part in the forced abdication of Prince Alexander I, and he was part of the convoy of Prince Alexander when he was taken out of the country. After the counter-coup, Dobrev was expelled from the Military School, but he was later pardoned and reinstated and thus was able to graduate.

In 1889 he was promoted to the rank of lieutenant and in the same year he began service in the Danube Flotilla and Sea Detachment in Ruse. In October 1899 he was already a watch officer and head of torpedo armament on the training cruiser Nadezhda.

In early 1904, Dobrev decided to take part in the Russo-Japanese War. He sent a report to the Ministry of Defense requesting that he be allowed to participate in the Second Pacific Squadron of the Russian Imperial Navy. He had obtained in advance the consent of the Chief of the Artillery Training Detachment and the Chief of the General Naval Staff of the Russian Empire. In that report, Dobrev developed the idea that the role of submarines would be of interest to him and Bulgarian naval officers in general - an indication of Dobrev's progressive views, as submarines were a novel and untested concept at the time.

In August 1904 he was allowed to be sent on "long-distance voyage practice" with the Russian Imperial Navy. In June–July 1904, Lieutenant Dobrev sailed on the battleship Imperator Nikolai I and the cruiser Vladimir Monomakh. On October 15, 1904, the Second Pacific Squadron set sail for Vladivostok from the port of Libava on the Baltic Sea, with the young lieutenant Dobrev on board as an artillery officer.

On May 15, 1905, Dobrev took part in the Battle of Tsushima as a crew member of the old cruiser Dmitry Donski. The cruiser was sunk during the battle and Dobrev was captured by the Japanese. On October 30, he was handed over to the Russian authorities and sailed for Vladivostok. From there - to St. Petersburg, where he arrived on November 30, 1905. In February 1906 he returned to Bulgaria. For his participation in the war, Lieutenant Dobrev was awarded the Bulgarian Order of Saint Alexander, IV grade with swords, and with the Russian Order of Saint Vladimir, IV grade with swords and bow, for "the particular feats of bravery and self-sacrifice performed by him in battle with the Japanese fleet on 14–15 May 1905".

After his return to Bulgaria, Dimitar Dobrev successively held the following positions:

- Head of the Machine School of His Royal Highness' Navy (1906 - 1908).
- Chief of the Mobile Defense (the branch of the navy that consisted of warships, as opposed to the Static Defense, which dealt with coastal artillery and mining operations)
- Commander of the cruiser Nadezhda.
- Senior aide at His Majesty's Navy Headquarters.

In 1911 he was dismissed from His Majesty's Navy.

During the First Balkan War, he was mobilized. At first, he was appointed head of the Semaphore and Observation Service, and then on November 1, 1912, he was re-appointed head of the Mobile Defense.

As a Captain 2nd rank, Dobrev commanded the torpedo boat detachment which successfully attacked the Ottoman cruiser Hamidiye on November 7–8, 1912. For this, he was awarded the Order of Bravery, III grade.

During the Second Balkan War, he was in charge of a Bulgarian flotilla of warships (Nadezhda and the six torpedo boats) and merchant ships (five steamers of the Bulgarian Shipping Company) when they were interred in Sevastopol in order to avoid falling into the hands of the advancing enemy. During that time, he had to act both as a naval commander and a diplomat.

In 1914, Dimitar Dobrev left His Majesty's Navy with the rank of Captain 1st rank. He worked for many years as a lawyer in Veliko Tarnovo.

== Legacy and honors ==
An auxiliary ship of the Bulgarian Navy is named after him.

== Awards ==
- Soldier Cross of Bravery, IV grade (1885)
- Order of Saint Alexander, IV grade with swords (1906)
- St. Vladimir, IV grade with swords and bow (1906)
- Order of Bravery, III grade (1912)

== Bibliography ==
- Руменин, Румен (1996). The Officer Corps in Bulgaria 1878 - 1944. Vol. 1 and 2. Sofia: Publishing House of the Ministry of Defense "St. George the Victorious”. pp. 271–274.
- The Unification 1885 - encyclopedic reference book. Sofia: State Publishing House "Dr. Peter Beron". 1985.
- Assoc. Pavlov: The participation of Chap. I rank D. Dobrev in the Russo-Japanese War
