= Atia, Bulgaria =

Atia Атия
- Village
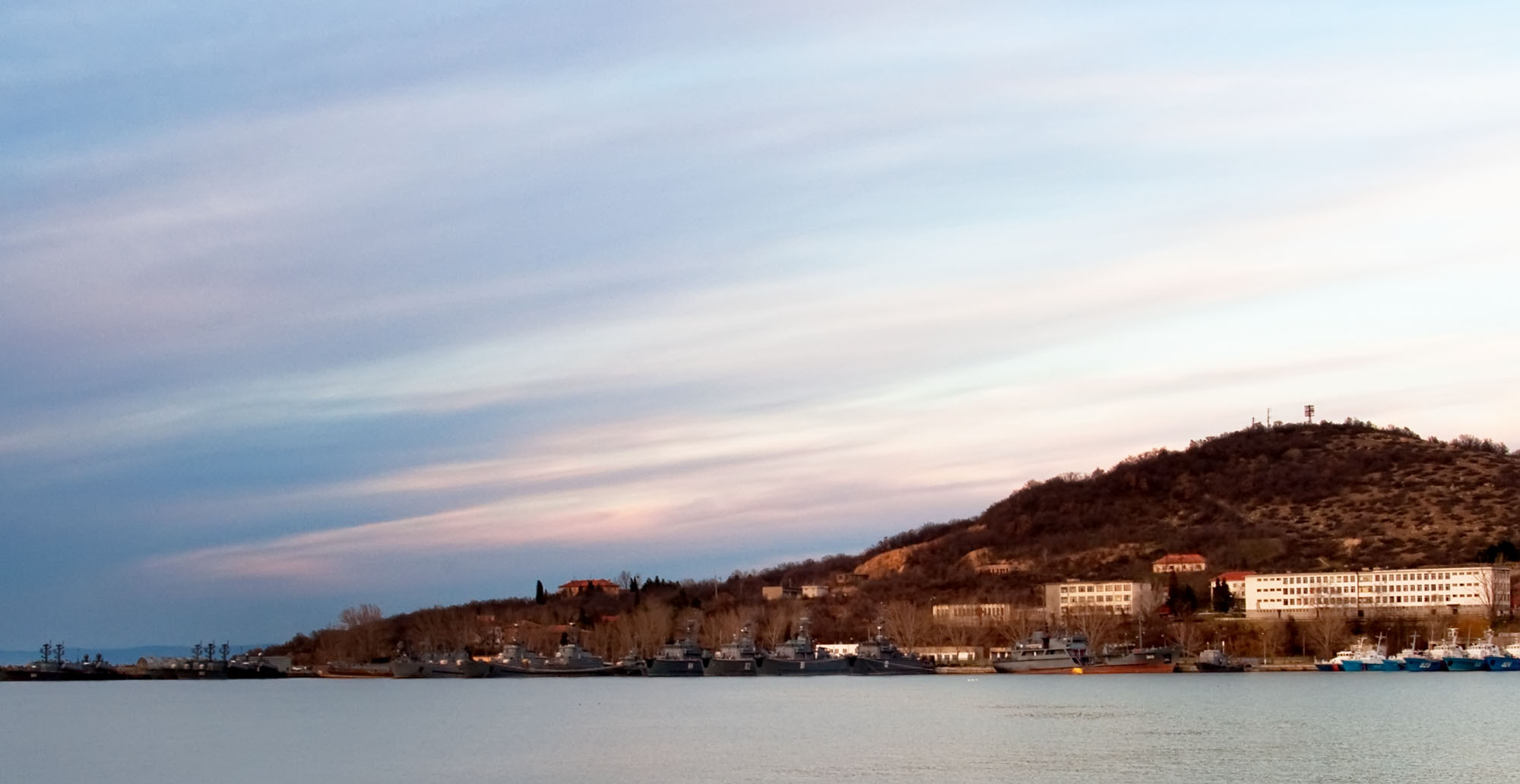

- Location within Bulgaria
- Coordinates: 42°26′20″N 27°35′5″E
- Country: Bulgaria
- Province: Burgas Province
- Municipality: Sozopol
- Elevation: 14 m (46 ft)

Population (2013)
  - Total: 825
- Time zone: UTC+2 (EET)
  - Summer (DST): UTC+3 (EEST)
- Postal code: 8150

Atia (Bulgarian: Атия) is a village in Sozopol Municipality, Burgas Province, south-eastern Bulgaria. As of 2013 it has 825 inhabitants. It hosts Bulgaria's largest naval base.

The village is located near Cape Atia, thus its name. It is situated at the northern foothills of Medni Rid Ridge, which is the north-eastern extreme of the Bosna Ridge in the Strandzha Mountains.

== Environmental problems ==
Until 2001 copper mines functioned in the vicinity of the village. Between 1954 and 1977 all the by-products and waste from the mining operations were dumped in the shallow waters near the Black Sea coast. As a result the village's beach was contaminated with mercury and radioactive elements which give the sand a distinctive dark color. Decontamination operations began in 1997 after it was determined that the background radiation in the area is twice the normal limit.
