= Battle of Kaliakra (1912) =

1912 naval battle

- Part of the Bulgarian front of the First Balkan War
- Battle of Kaliakra map
Date	21 November 1912
Location	off Cape Kaliakra, Bulgaria, 43°19′N 28°29′E
Result	Bulgarian victory

Belligerents
Bulgaria	Ottoman Empire

Commanders and leaders
Captain Dimitar Dobrev	Captain Rauf Orbay

Strength
4 torpedo boats (Drazki, Letyashti, Smeli, Strogi)	1 cruiser (Hamidiye); 2 destroyers

Casualties and losses
1 torpedo boat damaged 1 wounded	1 cruiser damaged 8 killed 30 wounded

The Battle of Kaliakra, usually known as the Attack of the Drazki (Bulgarian: Атаката на Дръзки) in Bulgaria, was a maritime action between four Bulgarian torpedo boats and the Ottoman cruiser Hamidiye in the Black Sea. It took place on 21 November 1912 at 32 miles off Bulgaria's primary port of Varna.

== Background ==
During the First Balkan War, the Ottoman navy performed many duties, including protecting military transport in the Black Sea, conducting operations in the Aegean Sea, and supporting the retreating army. While the navy was based in Istanbul, the ships provided support to the army in the Sea of Marmara at Silivri and Marmaraereğlisi, and in the Black Sea near Çatalca and Midye, while also providinig fire support against enemy units. The Bulgarian Navy, consisting of the 726-ton torpedo gunboat Nadezhda and six torpedo boats, established its main base in Varna and carried out port defense duties and operations against merchant ships. The main objective of the Bulgarian navy was to keep the sea lanes open to Russia. In transport between Constanța and Istanbul, Ottoman ships, to avoid the threat of Bulgarian torpedo boats, either sailed under the protection of Ottoman warships, passed Varna during daylight hours, or took a detour to stay outside the range of the torpedo boats.

== Battle ==
On 21 November an Ottoman convoy was attacked by the four Bulgarian torpedo boats Drazki (Bold), Letyashti (Flying), Smeli (Brave) and Strogi (Strict). The attack was led by Letyashti, whose torpedoes missed, as did those of Smeli and Strogi, Smeli being damaged by a 150 mm round with one of her crewmen wounded. Drazki however got within 100 meters from the Ottoman cruiser and her torpedoes struck the cruiser's starboard side, causing a 10 square meter hole.

On the Hamidiye, water had filled the main hold, the main arsenal, the stoker's quarters at the bow, and the coal bunker, and was seeping into neighboring compartments. Efforts were being made to drain the water with pumps and buckets. The struggle against the water was successful thanks to the well-trained crew, good management, and the functioning of the pumps. The ship's listing to the starboard side was balanced by taking on water on the port side, and by 02:30 the ship was righted. However, the ship's speed had dropped to five miles per hour, and it became clear that it could not continue to observe Varna.

The commander of the Hamidiye decided to return to Istanbul, and thinking that the Yarhisar and Berkefşan would be insufficient for the task, he sent a telegram to the commander of the Berk-i Satvet saying, "Come to Varna immediately. Sink the Bulgarian torpedo boats there, which may have been damaged in the night battle, along with the Yarhisar and Berkefşan ships." Upon receiving this message, Berk-i Satvet left its post in Constanta and immediately set sail.

After her battle with Bulgarian torpedo boats, Berkefşan headed towards the lights it saw off Cape Kaliakra. These lights belonged to Berk-i Satvet. After exchanging passwords, the two ships patrolled off the cape until morning. When Yarhisar arrived at the rendezvous point at 08:00 on November 21, it could not find Hamidiye and Berkefşan, and the ship's commander decided to keep watch for Varna. It made four passes at a distance of four miles from the city; it was not subjected to fire from the shore or Bulgarian torpedo boats. Due to the storm, it set sail for Istanbul at 17:00. Meanwhile, the commander of Berk-i Satvet also decided to send Berkefşan to Istanbul, and, thinking that its task of watching Varna was finished, set sail for Constanța. She did however have 8 crewmen killed and 30 wounded, and was repaired within months. After this encounter, the Ottoman blockade of the Bulgarian coast was significantly loosened.

== Aftermath ==
The acting Commander-in-chief learned by telegram on the morning of November 21 that the cruiser Hamidiye had been damaged off Varna and requested that a support ship be sent to the area. The Navy Commander, unaware of the damage to the Hamidiye, dispatched the cruiser Mecidiye to Varna. Upon learning of the Hamidiye's damage, he sent a tugboat and a salvage vessel. On her return journey to Istanbul, the Hamidiye encountered the Turgut Reis at 11:00 AM. The SMS Weissenburg provided the cruiser with a lifeboat and soldiers to assist in draining the water. At 3:50 PM, it encountered the Mecidiye and the İntibah. At 6:20 PM, it encountered the Zuhaf gunboat and tugboats, and under their escort, entered the Bosphorus, where it was taken to a dock for repairs in the Golden Horn the following morning.

The Hamidiye posed a significant threat to Bulgaria. The ship could have cut off Bulgaria's sea connection with Russia. The Bulgarians aimed to keep the sea link open for Russian aid. The victory at Varna was the greatest success of the Bulgarian navy in its history. The Bulgarian torpedo boats received a warm welcome when they arrived at the port and learned that the Nadezhda gunboat had orders to go to the rescue but could not leave the port because its captain did not know the route out of the minefield. The fact that the torpedoes of three of the Bulgarian boats were found near Sozopol and that Draçki's torpedo was not found showed that Hamidiye was hit by Draçki. After the battle, the Bulgarian torpedo boats were repaired and remained in service. The Bulgarian navy did not engage in another significant conflict until the ceasefire was declared. The surviving parts of the Draçki are exhibited as a museum ship by being mounted on the Stroki hull of the same class.

== Sources ==
- Hall, Richard (2000). The Balkan Wars 1912–1913 - Prelude to the First World War. Routledge.
- Langensiepen, Bernd; Güleryüz, Ahmet (1995). The Ottoman Steam Navy 1828–1923. London: Conway Maritime Press. ISBN 978-0-85177-610-1.
- Büyüktuğrul, Afif (1974). Osmanlı Deniz Harp Tarihi (PDF). Genelkurmay Başkanlığı Deniz Kuvvetleri Komutanlığı. Archived from the original (PDF) on 8 October 2020.
