= Bulgarian torpedo boat Drazki =

Bulgarian torpedo boat

Coordinates: 43°12′N 27°55′E

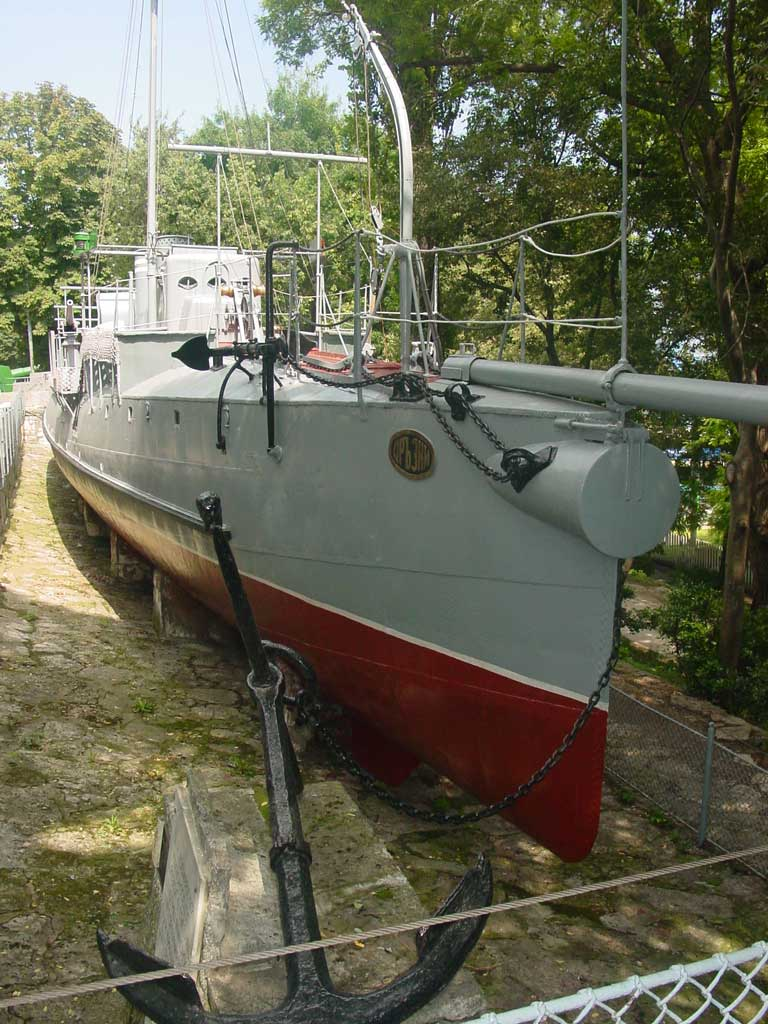
- Museum ship Drazki on static display in Varna's Sea Garden

History

Bulgaria
- Name: Drazki
- Builder: Schneider et Cie, Chalon-sur-Saône
- Launched: August 1900
- Commissioned: 1900
- Stricken: 1950
- Fate: Surviving parts were incorporated in a museum ship at the Naval Museum in Varna under the same name, using the hull of Strogi

General characteristics (World War II)
- Class & type: Drazki-class torpedo boat
- Displacement: 97 tons
- Length: 37.80 m (124.0 ft)
- Beam: 4.27 m (14.0 ft)
- Draught: 1.37 m (4 ft 6 in)
- Propulsion: 1 triple-expansion reciprocating engine, 1,900 hp, 1 shaft
- Speed: 26 knots (48 km/h; 30 mph)
- Complement: 23-30
- Armament: 2 × 47 mm 3-pounder guns; 2 × 37 mm SK C/30 AA guns; 3 × 460 mm torpedo tubes

Drazki (Bulgarian language: Дръзки; also transliterated as Druzki, "Intrepid") was a Bulgarian Navy torpedo boat built at the start of the 20th century. A ship of the same class is now a museum ship under her name in Varna.

== History ==
=== Construction and specifications ===
Drazki was part of a class of six torpedo boats. Her five sisters were named: Smeli (Смели, "Brave"), Hrabri (Храбри, "Valiant"), Shumni (Шумни, "Noisy"), Letyashti (Летящи, "Flying") and Strogi (Строги, "Stern"). The six boats were built at Varna in Bulgaria, using French-supplied materials and assistance. Drazki and her sisters were built between 1907 and 1908, with Drazki herself being launched in August 1907 and commissioned later that year.

During World War II, Drazki and her three remaining sisters had a normal displacement of 97 tons, measuring 37.80 meters in length, with a beam of 4.27 meters and a draught of 1.37 meters. They were powered by a one-shaft triple-expansion reciprocating engine generating 1,900 hp which gave them a top speed of 26 knots. The four boats were each armed at various times with two 47 mm guns or two 37 mm anti-aircraft guns and three 460 mm torpedo tubes.

=== Balkan Wars ===
The Bulgarian Navy's torpedo boats took part in the First Balkan War between 1912 and 1913, serving in the waters of the Black Sea. On 20 November 1912 Letyashti, Smeli, Strogi and Drazki were sent from Varna to intercept a group of Turkish transports. The overall commanding officer was commander Dimitar Dobrev, who was embarked on the Letyashti. The Drazki was commanded by Lt jg Georgi Kupov. Shortly after midnight on 21 November they encountered the Ottoman protected cruiser Hamidiye accompanied by two destroyers approximately 32 miles from Varna. Dobrev ordered the ships to close and attack, and at 0043 the Bulgarian ships fired their torpedoes. The first three ships missed, but Drazki was more fortunate. Since she was the last ship in the line, she fired her torpedo at a close range (about 100 m) and scored a hit in the front part of the Hamidiye, causing serious damage, although the ship was able to return to Istanbul for repairs.) Their torpedoes expended, the Bulgarian boats returned to Varna. This engagement was the greatest achievement up to that point in the history of the small Bulgarian Navy. Before the torpedo attack, the Ottoman naval commander had declared an ultimatum to the garrison of Varna to surrender as condition for the town to avoid shelling by the Ottoman Navy.

=== World War I ===
They did not take an active part in the Second Balkan War, however they did see active service in World War I, during which Shumni was sunk by a mine on 11/12-9-1916. After World War I the remaining five were judged to be obsolescent and were subsequently reclassified as patrol boats. In 1934 the 3-pounder guns were removed and replaced with two SK C/30 AA guns.

=== World War II ===
When Bulgaria entered World War II on the Axis side, Drazki and her four remaining sisters were antiquated but still capable of carrying out patrols. In 1942 the two SK C/30 AA guns were removed and the 3-pounders were reinstalled. On 15 October 1942, Drazki sank in Varna harbour after a magazine explosion, but she was soon repaired. In 1944 however, she became a gunnery target ship and remained in service in that capacity until the 1950s.

=== Museum ship ===
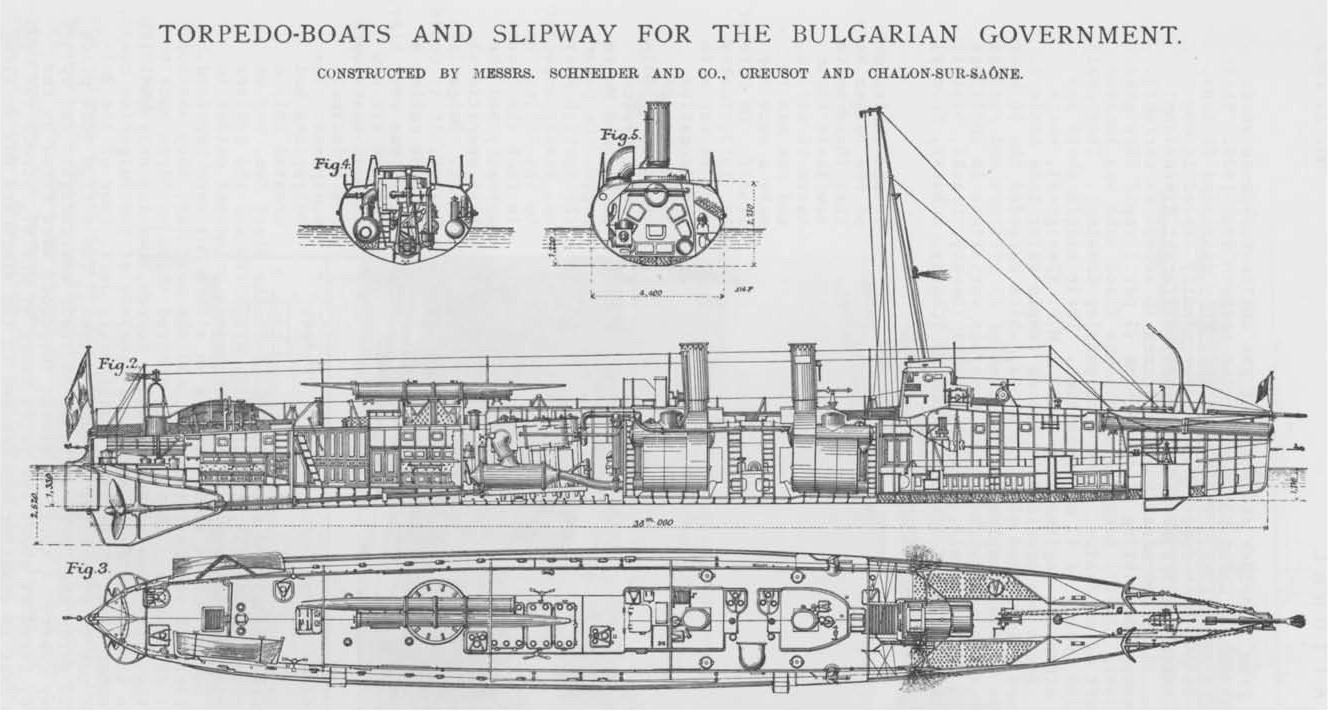

In 1957 it was decided to commemorate the 50-year-old Drazki, as she was by far the most famous ship in the Bulgarian Navy. However, by that time she had been at least partially broken up for scrap. Her gun, funnel and some of the deck and hull fittings were installed on board her sister ship Strogi, which, after 21 November 1957, became the museum ship Drazki. She is currently preserved as a static land display at the Naval Museum in Varna. Her other sister Hrabri was scrapped in 1962. In 1958 a Riga class frigate was named "Drazki". She served until 1992, when decommissioned.

In 2006 a Wielingen class frigate Wandelaar bought in Belgium for the Bulgarian Navy was named Drazki, and given the identification code F41.
