= Slabodka =

Slabodka may refer to:

== Gomel region ==
- Slabodka, Lelchitsy district
- Slabodka, Kalinkavichy district

== Minsk region ==
- Slabodka, Barysaw district
- Slabodka, Dzyarzhynsk district

== Mogilev oblast ==
- Slabodka, Babruysk district
- Slabodka, Klichaw district
- Slabodka, Mogilev district

== See also ==
- Slabodka, Slobodke, Slabodke, etc., the Yiddish name for Vilijampolė, now a neighborhood of Kaunas, Lithuania
- Slabodka yeshiva (disambiguation)
- Slobodka (disambiguation)
- Słobódka (disambiguation)
- Slobidka
