= Slobodka =

Slobodka may refer to:

- Slobodka, Russia, several rural localities in Russia
- Slabodka yeshiva (disambiguation)
- Slobodke (or Slabodke), the Yiddish name for Vilijampolė, now a neighborhood of Kaunas, Lithuania
- Slobodka (settlement), a type of settlement

== See also ==
- Slabodka (disambiguation)
- Slobidka
- Sloboda (disambiguation)
- Slobodskoy (disambiguation)
- Słobódka (disambiguation)
- Slobidka
