= Wloka =

Wloka may refer to:

- Hans Wloka (1925–1976), German footballer
- Hans-Jürgen Wloka (born 1951), German football player
- Anna Wloka (born 1993), Polish athlete
- Wólka, Polish name for Volok (unit), obsolete unit of land measurement

== See also ==
- Wólka (Polish placenames)
- Polish: włok means trawling
- Polish: włóka means "girl, young woman"
- Walka
