= Wólka =

Wólka is a diminutive of Wola and may refer to:

- Wólka, Aleksandrów County in Kuyavian-Pomeranian Voivodeship (central Poland)
- Wólka, Rypin County in Kuyavian-Pomeranian Voivodeship (north-central Poland)
- Wólka, Lipno County in Kuyavian-Pomeranian Voivodeship (north-central Poland)
- Wólka, Krasnystaw County in Lublin Voivodeship (east Poland)
- Wólka, Białystok County in Podlaskie Voivodeship (north-east Poland)
- Wólka, Bielsk County in Podlaskie Voivodeship (east Poland)
- Wólka, Grajewo County in Podlaskie Voivodeship (north-east Poland)
- Wólka, Hajnówka County in Podlaskie Voivodeship (east Poland)
- Wólka, Gmina Sidra in Podlaskie Voivodeship (north-east Poland)
- Wólka, Gmina Suchowola in Podlaskie Voivodeship (north-east Poland)
- Wólka, Suwałki County in Podlaskie Voivodeship (north-east Poland)
- Wólka, Gmina Filipów in Podlaskie Voivodeship (north-east Poland)
- Wólka, Gmina Poddębice in Łódź Voivodeship (central Poland)
- Wólka, Gmina Wartkowice in Łódź Voivodeship (central Poland)
- Wólka, Lublin County in Lublin Voivodeship (east Poland)
- Wólka, Łuków County in Lublin Voivodeship (east Poland)
- Wólka, Jędrzejów County in Świętokrzyskie Voivodeship (south-central Poland)
- Wólka, Końskie County in Świętokrzyskie Voivodeship (south-central Poland)
- Wólka, Subcarpathian Voivodeship (south-east Poland)
- Wólka, Lipsko County in Masovian Voivodeship (east-central Poland)
- Wólka, Płock County in Masovian Voivodeship (central Poland)
- Wólka, Warsaw West County in Masovian Voivodeship (east-central Poland)
- Wólka, Węgrów County in Masovian Voivodeship (east-central Poland)
- Wólka, Greater Poland Voivodeship (west-central Poland)
- Wólka, Silesian Voivodeship (south Poland)
- Wólka, Bartoszyce County in Warmian-Masurian Voivodeship (north Poland)
- Wólka, Gołdap County in Warmian-Masurian Voivodeship (north-east Poland)
- Wólka, Kętrzyn County in Warmian-Masurian Voivodeship (north Poland)
- Wólka, Olsztyn County in Warmian-Masurian Voivodeship (north Poland)
- Wólka, Pisz County in Warmian-Masurian Voivodeship (north-east Poland)
- Wólka, West Pomeranian Voivodeship (north-west Poland)

== See also ==
- Wola (disambiguation)
- Czech Lhotka (disambiguation)
- Slovak Lehôtka (disambiguation)
- Eastern Slavic Slobodka (disambiguation), Polonised Słobódka (disambiguation)
