= Dictatorship of Ion Antonescu =

Historical events that have occurred under Ion Antonescu's leadership (1940–1944)

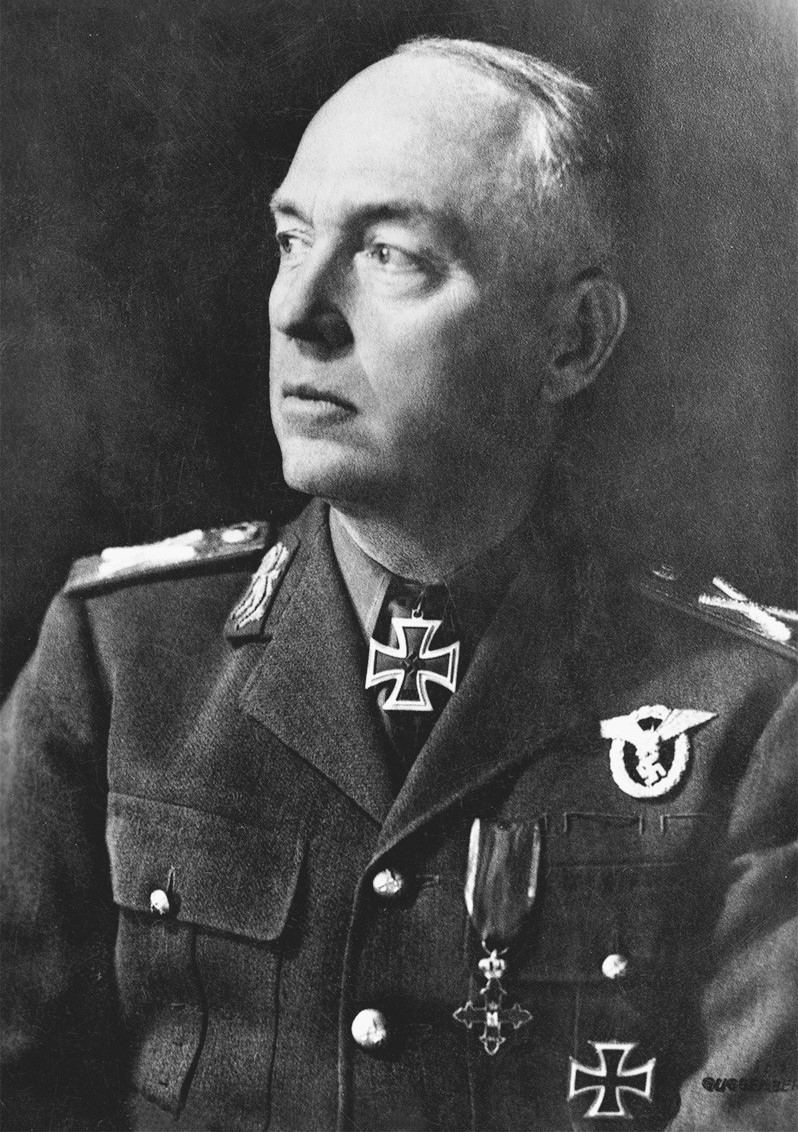
Antonescu is commonly referred to as "Hitler's forgotten ally" as a result of the significance of the regime under his leadership not being widely covered

The dictatorship of Ion Antonescu in the Kingdom of Romania began in 1940 and lasted until 1944. As Ion Antonescu suppressed the rebellion led by the Iron Guard and dissolved the party, he became the uncontested leader of Romania until being overthrown in 1944 by King Michael. The regime kept certain elements of the ideology of the Iron Guard and the Romanian far-right, namely integral nationalism, ethnonationalism, racism, antisemitism, antiziganism and politicised Christianity; Antonescu himself termed his regime as "ethnocratic", "ethnic Christian" and "the national-totalitarian regime, the regime of national and social restoration." In general, this regime is defined as authoritarian conservative and para-fascist , i. e. a conservative regime with fascist trappings and attributes as opposed to fascist, although the label "fascist" still may be encountered in academia regarding the regime. Under Antonescu, Romania became a member of the Axis powers of World War II and joined the Nazi invasion of the Soviet Union, becoming the most important ally of Nazi Germany on the Eastern Front.

== Background ==
=== Rise to power ===
Banner of Ion Antonescu as Conducător

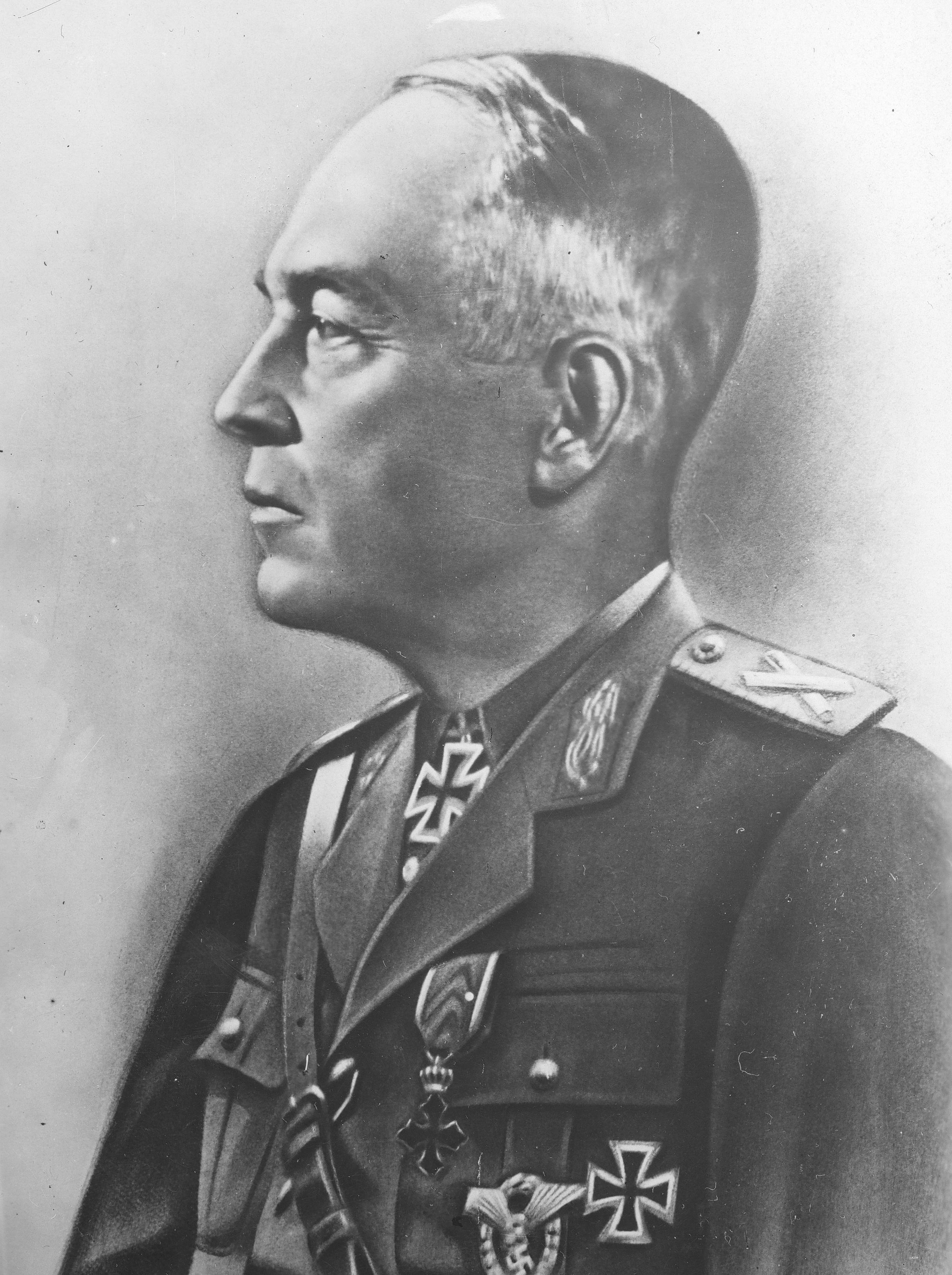
Antonescu's official portrait, 1942

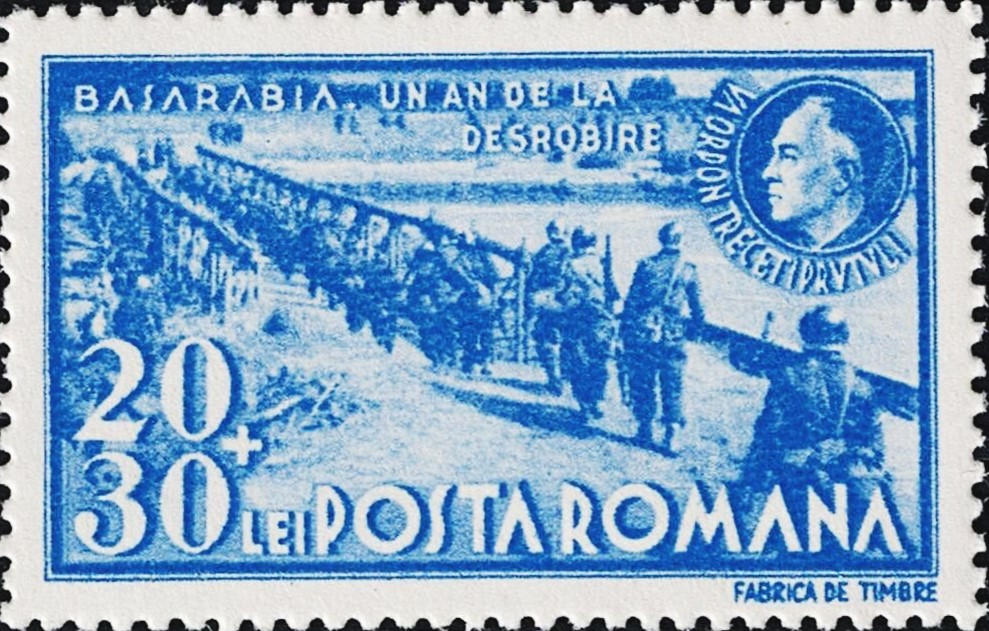
1942 post stamp featuring Antonescu

Romania's elite had been intensely Francophile ever since Romania had won its independence in the 19th century, indeed so Francophile that the defeat of France in June 1940 had the effect of discrediting the entire elite. Antonescu's internment ended in August, during which interval, under Axis pressure, Romania had ceded Southern Dobruja to Bulgaria (see Treaty of Craiova) and Northern Transylvania to Hungary. The latter grant caused consternation among large sections of Romania's population, causing Carol's popularity to fall to a record low and provoking large-scale protests in Bucharest, the capital. These movements were organised competitively by the pro-Allied PNȚ, headed by Iuliu Maniu, and the pro-Nazi Iron Guard. The latter group had been revived under the leadership of Horia Sima, and was organizing a coup d'état. In this troubled context, Antonescu simply left his assigned residence. He may have been secretly helped in this by German intercession, but was more directly aided to escape by socialite Alice Sturdza, who was acting on Maniu's request. Antonescu subsequently met with Maniu in Ploiești, where they discussed how best to manage the political situation. While these negotiations were carried out, the monarch himself was being advised by his entourage to recover legitimacy by governing in tandem with the increasingly popular Antonescu, while creating a new political majority from the existing forces.

On 2 September 1940, Valer Pop, a courtier and an important member of the camarilla, first advised Carol to appoint Antonescu as Prime Minister as the solution to the crisis. Pop's reasons for advising Carol to appoint Antonescu as Prime Minister were partly because Antonescu, who was known to be friendly with the Iron Guard and who had been imprisoned under Carol, was believed to have enough of an oppositional background to Carol's regime to appease the public and partly because Pop knew that Antonescu, for all his Legionary sympathies, was a member of the elite and believed he would never turn against it. When Carol proved reluctant to make Antonescu Prime Minister, Pop visited the German legation to meet with Fabricius on the night of 4 September 1940 to ask that the German minister phone Carol to tell him that the Reich wanted Antonescu as Prime Minister, and Fabricius promptly did just that. Carol and Antonescu accepted the proposal, Antonescu being ordered to approach political party leaders Maniu of the PNȚ and Dinu Brătianu of the PNL. They all called for Carol's abdication as a preliminary measure, while Sima, another leader sought after for negotiations, could not be found in time to express his opinion. Antonescu partly complied with the request but also asked Carol to bestow upon him the reserve powers for Romanian heads of state. Carol yielded and, on 5 September 1940, the general became Prime Minister, and Carol transferred most of his dictatorial powers to him. The latter's first measure was to curtail potential resistance within the Army by relieving Bucharest Garrison chief Gheorghe Argeșanu of his position and replacing him with Dumitru Coroamă. Shortly afterward, Antonescu heard rumours that two of Carol's loyalist generals, Gheorghe Mihail and Paul Teodorescu, were planning to have him killed. In reaction, he forced Carol to abdicate, while General Coroamă was refusing to carry out the royal order of shooting down Iron Guardist protesters.

Michael ascended the throne for the second time, while Antonescu's dictatorial powers were confirmed and extended. On 6 September, the day Michael formally assumed the throne, he issued a royal decree declaring Antonescu Conducător (leader) of the state. The same decree relegated the monarch to a ceremonial role. Among Antonescu's subsequent measures was ensuring the safe departure into self-exile of Carol and his mistress Elena Lupescu, granting protection to the royal train when it was attacked by armed members of the Iron Guard. The regime of King Carol had been notorious for being the most corrupt regime in Europe during the 1930s, and when Carol fled Romania, he took with him the better part of the Romanian treasury, leaving the new government with enormous financial problems. Antonescu had expected, perhaps naïvely, that Carol would take with him enough money to provide for a comfortable exile, and was surprised that Carol had cleared out almost the entire national treasury. For the next four years, a major concern of Antonescu's government was attempting to have the Swiss banks where Carol had deposited the assets return the money to Romania; this effort did not meet with success.

Horia Sima's subsequent cooperation with Antonescu was endorsed by high-ranking Nazi German officials, many of whom feared the Iron Guard was too weak to rule on its own. Antonescu therefore received the approval of Ambassador Fabricius. Despite early promises, Antonescu abandoned projects for the creation of a national government, and opted instead for a coalition between a military dictatorship lobby and the Iron Guard. He later justified his choice by stating that the Iron Guard "represented the political base of the country at the time." Right from the outset, Antonescu clashed with Sima over economic questions, with Antonescu's main concern being to get the economy growing so as to provide taxes for a treasury looted by Carol, while Sima favoured populist economic measures that Antonescu insisted there was no money for.

=== Antonescu-Sima partnership ===
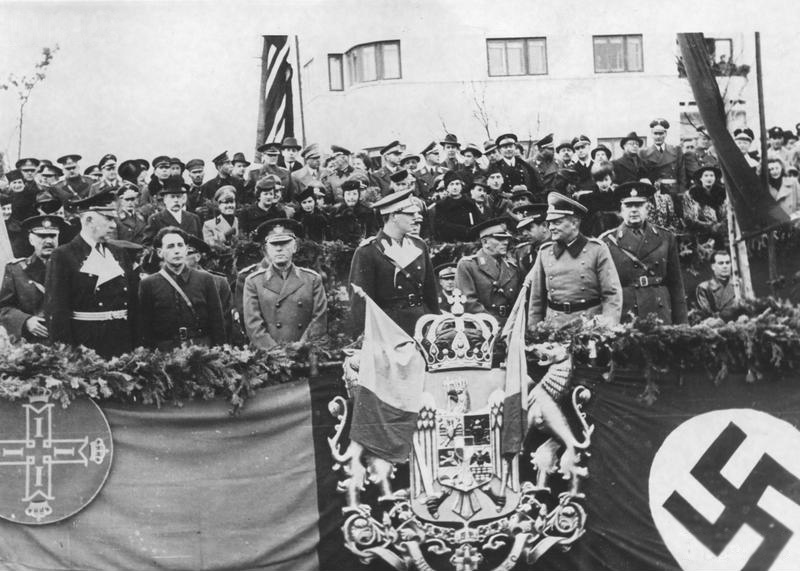
Horia Sima, Antonescu and King Michael I of Romania, 1940

The resulting regime, deemed the National Legionary State, was officially proclaimed on 14 September. On that date, the Iron Guard was remodelled into the only legally permitted party in Romania. Antonescu continued as Premier and Conducător, and was named as the Guard's honorary commander. Sima became Deputy Premier and leader of the Guard. Antonescu subsequently ordered the Guardists imprisoned by Carol to be set free. On 6 October, he presided over the Iron Guard's mass rally in Bucharest, one in a series of major celebratory and commemorative events organised by the movement during the late months of 1940. However, he tolerated the PNȚ and PNL's informal existence, allowing them to preserve much of their political support.

There followed a short-lived and always uneasy partnership between Antonescu and Sima. In late September, the new regime denounced all pacts, accords and diplomatic agreements signed under Carol, bringing the country into Germany's orbit while subverting its relationship with a former Balkan ally, the Kingdom of Yugoslavia. Germans troops entered the country in stages, in order to defend the local oil industry and help instruct their Romanian counterparts on Blitzkrieg tactics. On 23 November, Antonescu was in Berlin, where his signature sealed Romania's commitment to the main Axis instrument, the Tripartite Pact. Two days later, the country also adhered to the Nazi-led Anti-Comintern Pact. Other than these generic commitments, Romania had no treaty binding it to Germany, and the Romanian-German alliance functioned informally. Speaking in 1946, Antonescu claimed to have followed the pro-German path in continuation of earlier policies, and for fear of a Nazi protectorate in Romania.

During the National Legionary State period, earlier antisemitic legislation was upheld and strengthened, while the "Romanianization" of Jewish-owned enterprises became standard official practice. Immediately after coming into office, Antonescu himself expanded the anti-Jewish and Nuremberg law-inspired legislation passed by his predecessors Goga and Ion Gigurtu, while tens of new anti-Jewish regulations were passed in 1941–1942. This was done despite his formal pledge to Wilhelm Filderman and the Jewish Communities Federation that, unless engaged in "sabotage," "the Jewish population will not suffer." Antonescu did not reject the application of Legionary policies, but was offended by Sima's advocacy of paramilitarism and the Guard's frequent recourse to street violence. He drew much hostility from his partners by extending some protection to former dignitaries whom the Iron Guard had arrested. One early incident opposed Antonescu to the Guard's newspaper Buna Vestire, which accused him of leniency and was subsequently forced to change its editorial board. By then, the Legionary press was routinely claiming that he was obstructing revolution and aiming to take control of the Iron Guard, and that he had been transformed into a tool of Freemasonry. The political conflict coincided with major social challenges, including the influx of refugees from areas lost earlier in the year and a large-scale earthquake affecting Bucharest.

Disorder peaked in the last days of November 1940, when, after uncovering the circumstances of Codreanu's death, the fascist movement ordered retaliations against political figures previously associated with Carol, carrying out the Jilava Massacre, the assassinations of Nicolae Iorga and Virgil Madgearu, and several other acts of violence. As retaliation for this insubordination, Antonescu ordered the Army to resume control of the streets, unsuccessfully pressured Sima to have the assassins detained, ousted the Iron Guardist prefect of Bucharest Police Ștefan Zăvoianu, and ordered Legionary ministers to swear an oath to the Conducător. His condemnation of the killings was nevertheless limited and discreet, and, the same month, he joined Sima at a burial ceremony for Codreanu's newly discovered remains. The widening gap between the dictator and Sima's party resonated in Berlin. When, in December, Legionary Foreign Minister Mihail R. Sturdza obtained the replacement of Fabricius with Manfred Freiherr von Killinger, perceived as more sympathetic to the Iron Guard, Antonescu promptly took over leadership of the ministry, with the compliant diplomat Constantin Greceanu as his right hand. In Germany, such leaders of the Nazi Party as Heinrich Himmler, Baldur von Schirach and Joseph Goebbels threw their support behind the Legionaries, whereas Foreign Minister Joachim von Ribbentrop and the Wehrmacht stood by Antonescu. The latter group was concerned that any internal conflict would threaten Romania's oil industry, vital to the German war effort. The German leadership was by then secretly organizing Operation Barbarossa, the attack on the Soviet Union.

=== Legionary Rebellion and Operation Barbarossa ===
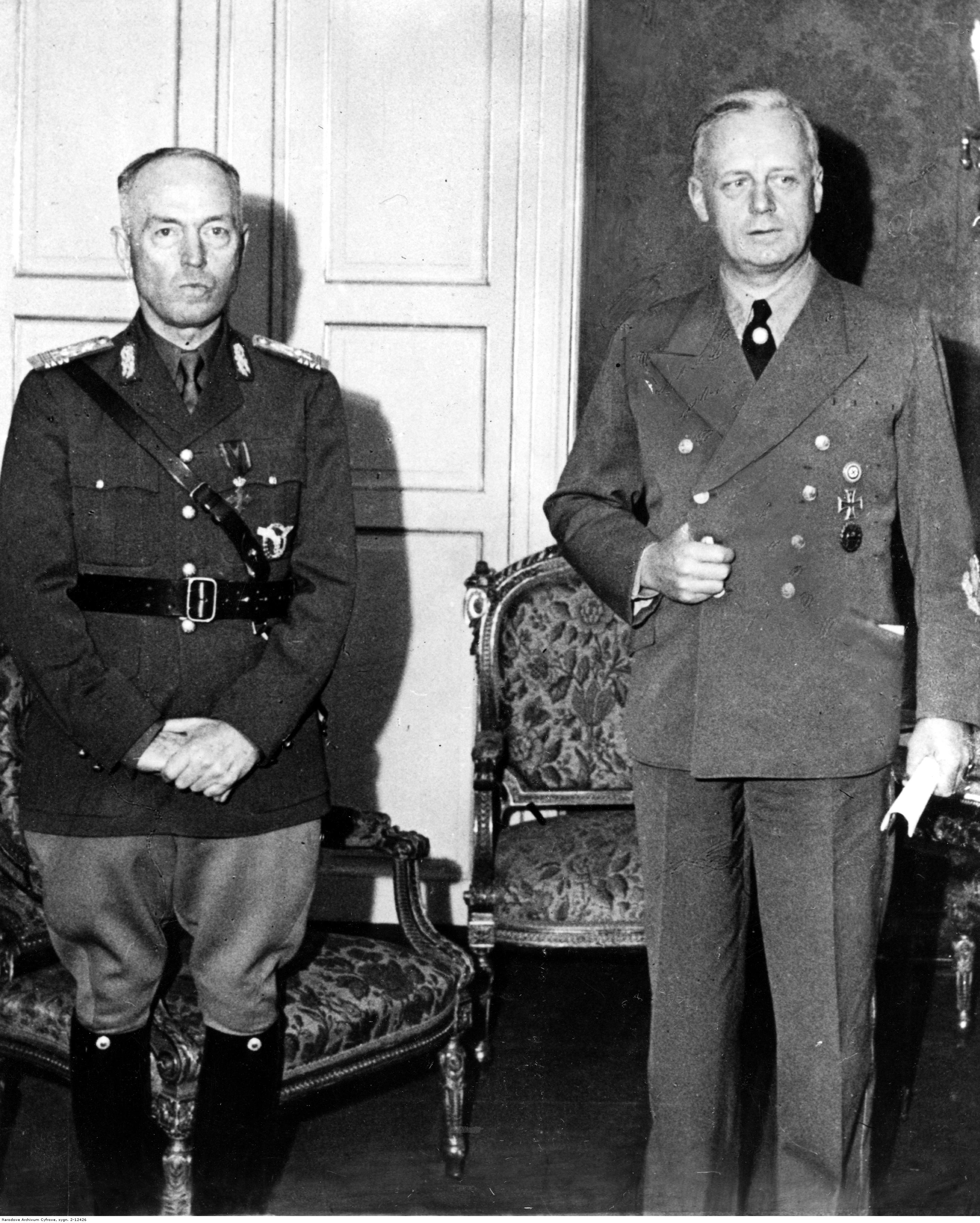
Antonescu with German foreign minister Joachim von Ribbentrop in June 1941

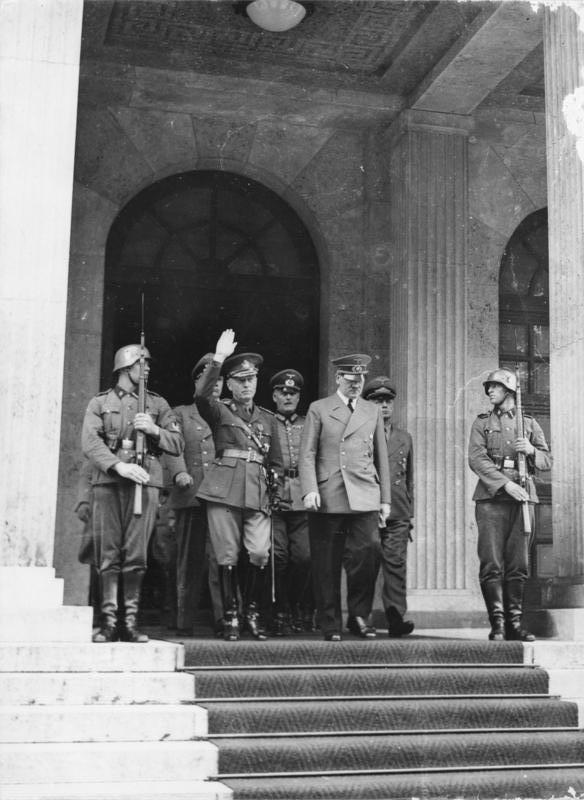
Antonescu and Adolf Hitler at the Führerbau in Munich (June 1941). Joachim von Ribbentrop and Generalfeldmarschall Wilhelm Keitel in the background

Antonescu's plan to act against his coalition partners in the event of further disorder hinged on Hitler's approval, a vague signal of which had been given during ceremonies confirming Romania's adherence to the Tripartite Pact. A decisive turn occurred when Hitler invited Antonescu and Sima both over for discussions: whereas Antonescu agreed, Sima stayed behind in Romania, probably plotting a coup d'état. While Hitler did not produce a clear endorsement for clamping down on Sima's party, he made remarks interpreted by their recipient as oblique blessings. On 14 January 1941 during a German-Romanian summit, Hitler informed Antonescu of his plans to invade the Soviet Union later that year and asked Romania to participate. By this time, Hitler had come to the conclusion that while Sima was ideologically closer to him, Antonescu was the more competent leader capable of ensuring stability in Romania while being committed to aligning his country with the Axis.

The Antonescu-Sima dispute erupted into violence in January 1941, when the Iron Guard instigated a series of attacks on public institutions and a pogrom, incidents collectively known as the "Legionary Rebellion." This came after the mysterious assassination of Major Döring, a German agent in Bucharest, which was used by the Iron Guard as a pretext to accuse the Conducător of having a secret anti-German agenda, and made Antonescu oust the Legionary Interior Minister, Constantin Petrovicescu, while closing down all of the Legionary-controlled "Romanianization" offices. Various other clashes prompted him to demand the resignation of all Police commanders who sympathised with the movement. After two days of widespread violence, during which Guardists killed some 120 Bucharest Jews, Antonescu sent in the Army, under the command of General Constantin Sănătescu. German officials acting on Hitler's orders, including the new Ambassador Manfred Freiherr von Killinger, helped Antonescu eliminate the Iron Guardists, but several of their lower-level colleagues actively aided Sima's subordinates. Goebbels was especially upset by the decision to support Antonescu, believing it to have been advantageous to "the Freemasons."

After the purge of the Iron Guard, Hitler kept his options open by granting political asylum to Sima—whom Antonescu's courts sentenced to death—and to other Legionaries in similar situations. The Guardists were detained in special conditions at Buchenwald and Dachau concentration camps. In parallel, Antonescu publicly obtained the cooperation of Codreanists, members of an Iron Guardist wing which had virulently opposed Sima, and whose leader was Codreanu's father Ion Zelea Codreanu. Antonescu again sought backing from the PNȚ and PNL to form a national cabinet, but his rejection of parliamentarism made the two groups refuse him.

Antonescu traveled to Germany and met Hitler on eight more occasions between June 1941 and August 1944. Such close contacts helped cement an enduring relationship between the two dictators, and Hitler reportedly came to see Antonescu as the only trustworthy person in Romania, and the only foreigner to consult on military matters. The American historian Gerhard Weinberg wrote that Hitler after first meeting Antonescu "...was greatly impressed by him; no other leader Hitler met other than Mussolini ever received such consistently favourable comments from the German dictator. Hitler even mustered the patience to listen to Antonescu's lengthy disquisitions on the glorious history of Romania and the perfidy of the Hungarians—a curious reversal for a man who was more accustomed to regaling visitors with tirades of his own." In later statements, Hitler offered praise to Antonescu's "breadth of vision" and "real personality." A remarkable aspect of the Hitler-Antonescu friendship was neither could speak other's language. Hitler only knew German, while the only foreign language Antonescu knew was French, in which he was completely fluent. During their meetings, Antonescu spoke French, which was then translated into German by Hitler's interpreter Paul Schmidt and vice versa, since Schmidt did not speak Romanian either.

The German military presence increased significantly in early 1941, when, using Romania as a base, Hitler invaded the rebellious Kingdom of Yugoslavia and the Kingdom of Greece. In parallel, Romania's relationship with the United Kingdom, at the time the only major adversary of Nazi Germany, erupted into conflict: on 10 February 1941, British Premier Winston Churchill recalled His Majesty's Ambassador Reginald Hoare, and approved the blockade of Romanian ships in British-controlled ports. On 12 June 1941, during another summit with Hitler, Antonescu first learned of the "special" nature of Operation Barbarossa, namely, that the war against the Soviet Union was to be an ideological war to "annihilate" the forces of "Judeo-Bolshevism," a "war of extermination" to be fought without any mercy; Hitler even showed Antonescu a copy of the "Guidelines for the Conduct of the Troops in Russia" he had issued to his forces about the "special treatment" to be handed out to Soviet Jews. Antonescu completely accepted Hitler's ideas about Operation Barbarossa as a "race war" between the Aryans, represented by the Nordic Germans and Latin Romanians on the Axis side vs. the Slavs and Asians, commanded by the Jews on the Soviet side. Besides anti-Semitism, there was an extremely strong current of anti-Slavic and anti-Asian racism to Antonescu's remarks about the "Asiatic hordes" of the Red Army. The Asians Antonescu referred were the various Asian peoples of the Soviet Union, such as the Kazakhs, Kalmyks, Mongols, Uzbeks, Buryats, etc. During his summit with Hitler in June 1941, Antonescu told the Führer that he believed it was necessary to "once and for all" eliminate Russia as a power because the Russians were the most powerful Slavic nation and that as a Latin people, the Romanians had an inborn hatred of all Slavs and Jews. Antonescu went on to tell Hitler: "Because of its racial qualities, Romania can continue to play its role as an anti-Slavic buffer for the benefit of Germany." Ancel wrote that Romanian anti-Slavic racism differed from the German variety in that the Romanians had traditionally feared the Slavic peoples whereas the Germans had traditionally held the Slavic peoples in contempt. In Antonescu's mind, the Romanians as a Latin people had attained a level of civilization that the Slavs were nowhere close to, but theoretically the Slavic Russians and Ukrainians might be able to reach under Romanian auspices, although Antonescu's remarks to Hitler that "We must fight this race (i.e. the Slavs) resolutely" together, "with the need for 'colonization' of Transnistria," suggests that he did think this would happen in his own lifetime. Subsequently, the Romanians assigned to Barbarossa were to learn that as a Latin people, the Germans considered them to be their inferiors, albeit not as inferior as the Slavs, Asians and Jews who were viewed as untermenschen ("sub-humans"). Hitler's promise to Antonescu that after the war, the Germanic and Latin races would rule the world in a partnership turned out to be meaningless.

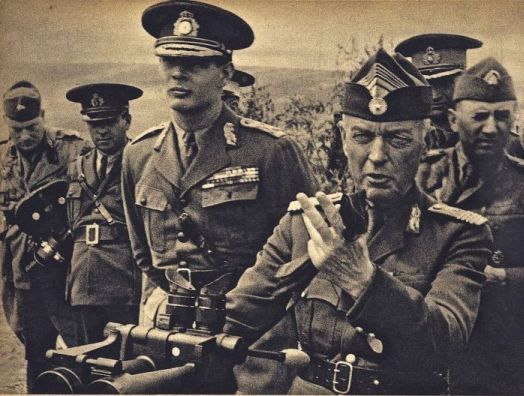
King Michael I and Antonescu at the border, on the river Prut, watching the deployment of the Romanian Army in 1941

In June of that year, Romania joined the attack on the Soviet Union, led by Germany in coalition with Hungary, Finland, the State of Slovakia, the Kingdom of Italy, and the Independent State of Croatia. Antonescu had been made aware of the plan by German envoys, and supported it enthusiastically even before Hitler extended Romania an offer to participate. On 18 June 1941, Antonescu gave orders to his generals about "cleansing the ground" of Jews when Romanian forces entered Bessarabia and Bukovina. Right from the start, Antonescu proclaimed the war against the Soviet Union to be a "holy war", a "crusade" in the name of Eastern Orthodox faith and the Romanian race against the forces of "Judeo-Bolshevism". The propaganda of the Antonescu regime demonised everything Jewish as Antonescu believed that Communism was invented by the Jews, and all of the Soviet leaders were really Jews. Reflecting Antonescu's anti-Slavic feelings, despite the fact that the war was billed as a "crusade" in defence of Orthodoxy against "Judeo-Bolshevism", the war was not presented as a struggle to liberate the Orthodox Russians and Ukrainians from Communism; instead rule by "Judeo-Bolshevism" was portrayed as something brought about the innate moral inferiority of the Slavs, who thus needed to be ruled by the Germans and the Romanians. The Romanian force engaged formed a General Antonescu Army Group under the effective command of German general Eugen Ritter von Schobert. Romania's campaign on the Eastern Front began without a formal declaration of war, and was consecrated by Antonescu's statement: "Soldiers, I order you, cross the Prut River" (in reference to the Bessarabian border between Romania and post-1940 Soviet territory). A few days after this, a large-scale pogrom was carried out in Iași with Antonescu's agreement; thousands of Jews were killed in the bloody Iași pogrom. Antonescu had followed a generation of younger right-wing Romanian intellectuals led by Corneliu Zelea Codreanu who in the 1920s–30s had rejected the traditional Francophilia of the Romanian elites and their adherence to Western notions of universal democratic values and human rights. Antonescu made it clear that his regime rejected the moral principles of the "demo-liberal world" and he saw the war as an ideological struggle between his spiritually pure "national-totalitarian regime" vs. "Jewish morality". Antonescu believed that the liberal humanist-democratic-capitalist values of the West and Communism were both invented by the Jews to destroy Romania. In a lengthy speech just before the war, Antonescu attacked democracy in the most violent terms as it allowed Jews equal rights and thus to undercut the Romanian "national idea". As such, Antonescu stated what was needed was a "new man" who would be "tough", "virile" and willing to fight for an ethnically and religiously "pure" Romania. Despite his quarrel with Sima, much of Antonescu's speech clearly reflected the influence of the ideas of the Iron Guard that Antonescu had absorbed in the 1930s. Antonescu's anti-Semitism and sexism went so far that he tacitly condoned the rape of Jewish women and girls in Bessarabia and northern Bukovinia by his forces under the grounds that he was going take away all of the property that the Jews had "stolen" from the Romanians, and as far he was concerned, Jewish females were just another piece of property. Since the Jewish women were going to be exterminated anyway, Antonescu felt there was nothing wrong about letting his soldiers and gendarmes have "some fun" before shooting them.

After becoming the first Romanian to be granted the Knight's Cross of the Iron Cross, which he received from Hitler at their 6 August meeting in the Ukrainian city of Berdychiv, Antonescu was promoted to Marshal of Romania by royal decree on 22 August, in recognition for his role in restoring the eastern frontiers of Greater Romania. In a report to Berlin, a German diplomat wrote that Marshal Antonescu had syphilis and that "among [Romanian] cavalry officers this disease is as widespread as a common cold is among German officers. The Marshal suffers from severe attacks of it every several months." Antonescu took one of his most debated decisions when, with Bessarabia's conquest almost complete, he committed Romania to Hitler's war effort beyond the Dniester—that is, beyond territory that had been part of Romania between the wars—and thrust deeper into Soviet territory, thus waging a war of aggression. On 30 August, Romania occupied a territory it deemed "Transnistria", formerly a part of the Ukrainian SSR (including the entire Moldavian ASSR and further territories). Like the decision to continue the war beyond Bessarabia, this earned Antonescu much criticism from the semi-clandestine PNL and PNȚ. Insofar as the war against the Soviet Union was a war to recover Bessarabia and northern Bukovina – both regions that been a part of Romania until June 1940 and that had Romanian majorities – the conflict had been very popular with the Romanian public opinion. But the idea of conquering Transnistria was not as that region had never been part of Romania, and a minority of the people were ethnic Romanian. Soon after the takeover, the area was assigned to a civil administration apparatus headed by Gheorghe Alexianu and became the site for the main component of the Holocaust in Romania: a mass deportation of the Bessarabian and Ukrainian Jews, followed later by transports of Romani Romanians and Jews from Moldavia proper (that is, the portions of Moldavia west of the Prut).

The accord over Transnistria's administration, signed in Tighina, also placed areas between the Dniester and the Dnieper under Romanian military occupation, while granting control over all resources to Germany. In September 1941, Antonescu ordered Romanian forces to take Odessa, a prize he badly wanted for reasons of prestige. Russians had traditionally been seen in Romania as brutal aggressors, and for Romanian forces to take a major Soviet city and one of the largest Black Sea ports like Odessa would be a sign of how far Romania had been "regenerated" under Antonescu's leadership. Much to Antonescu's intense fury, the Red Army were able to halt the Romanian offensive on Odessa and 24 September 1941 Antonescu had to reluctantly ask for the help of the Wehrmacht with the drive on Odessa. On 16 October 1941 Odessa fell to the German-Romanian forces. The Romanian losses had been so heavy that the area around Odessa was known to the Romanian Army as the Vale of Tears. Antonescu's anti-Semitism was sharpened by the Odessa fighting as he was convinced that the only reason why the Red Army had fought so fiercely around Odessa was that the average Russian soldier had been terrorised by bloodthirsty Jewish commissars into fighting hard. When Wilhelm Filderman wrote a letter to Antonescu complaining about the murder of Jews in Odessa, Antonescu wrote back: "Your Jews, who have become Soviet commissars, are driving Soviet soldiers in the Odessa region into a futile bloodbath, through horrendous terror techniques as the Russian prisoners themselves have admitted, simply to cause us heavy losses". Antonescu ended his letter with the claim that Russian Jewish commissars had savagely tortured Romanian POWs and that the entire Jewish community of Romania, Filderman included were morally responsible for all of the losses and sufferings of the Romanians around Odessa. In the fall of 1941, Antonescu planned to deport all of the Jews of the Regat, southern Bukovina and southern Transylvania into Transnistria as the prelude to killing them, but this operation was vetoed by Germany, who complained that Antonescu had not finished killing the Jews of Transnistria yet. This veto was largely motivated by bureaucratic politics, namely if Antonescu exterminated all of the Jews of Romania himself, there would be nothing for the SS and the Auswärtiges Amt to do. Killinger informed Antonescu that Germany would reduce its supplies of arms if Antonescu went ahead with his plans to deport the Jews of the Regat into Transnistria and told him he would be better off deporting the Jews to the death camps in Poland that the Germans were already busy building. Since Romania had almost no arms industry of its own and was almost entirely dependent upon weapons from Germany to fight the war, Antonescu had little choice, but to comply with Killinger's request.

=== Reversal of fortunes ===
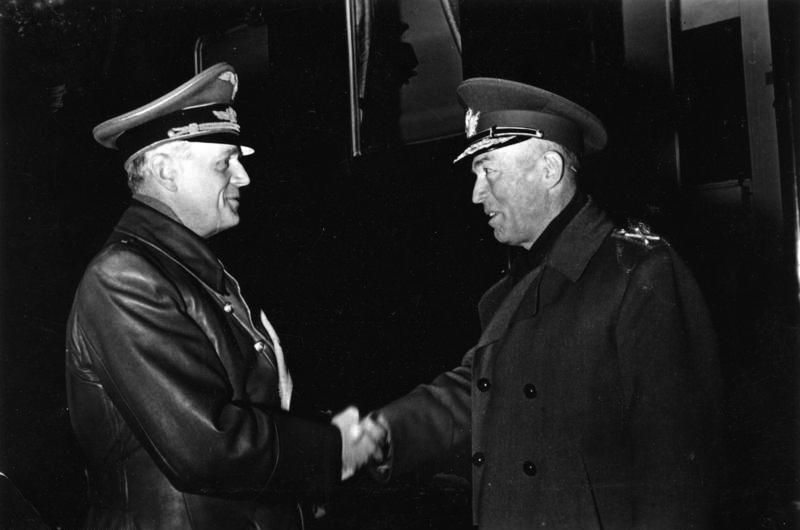
Antonescu being greeted by Joachim von Ribbentrop during a 1943 visit to Germany

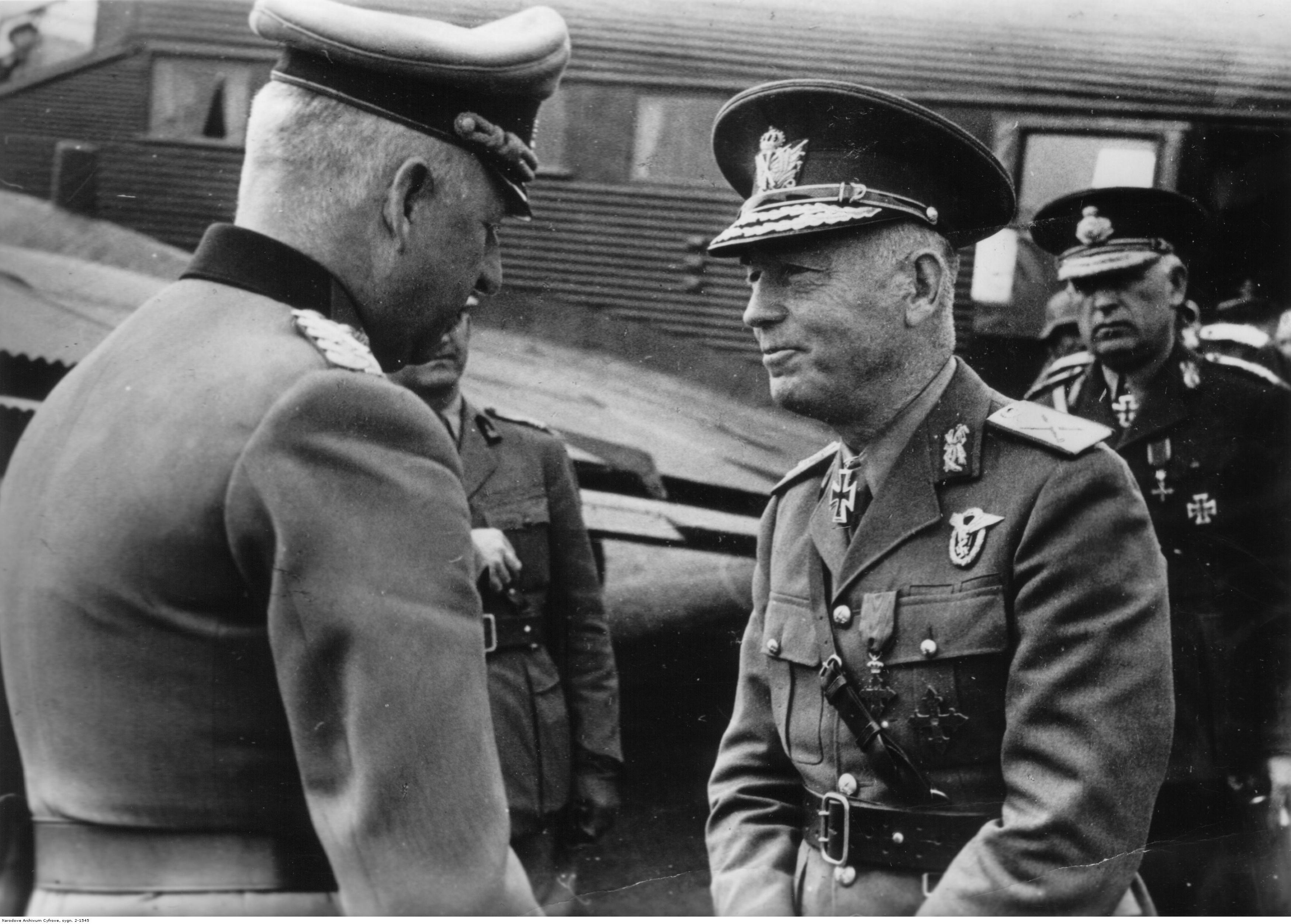
Erich von Manstein (left) welcomes Antonescu and General Dumitrescu (right) during a 1943 visit to Germany

The Romanian Army's inferior arms, insufficient armour and lack of training had been major concerns for the German commanders since before the start of the operation. One of the earliest major obstacles Antonescu encountered on the Eastern Front was the resistance of Odessa, a Soviet port on the Black Sea. Refusing any German assistance, he ordered the Romanian Army to maintain a two-month siege on heavily fortified and well-defended positions. The ill-equipped 4th Army suffered losses of some 100,000 men. Antonescu's popularity again rose in October, when the fall of Odessa was celebrated triumphantly with a parade through Bucharest's Arcul de Triumf, and when many Romanians reportedly believed the war was as good as won. In Odessa itself, the aftermath included a large-scale massacre of the Jewish population, ordered by the Marshal as retaliation for a bombing which killed a number of Romanian officers and soldiers (General Ioan Glogojeanu among them). The city subsequently became the administrative capital of Transnistria. According to one account, the Romanian administration planned to change Odessa's name to Antonescu. Antonescu planned that, once the war against the Soviet Union was won, he would invade Hungary to take back Transylvania and Bulgaria to take back the Dobruja with Antonescu being especially keen on the former. Antonescu planned on attacking Hungary to recover Transylvania at the first opportunity and regarded Romanian involvement on the Eastern Front in part as a way of proving to Hitler that Romania was a better German ally than Hungary, and thus deserving of German support when the planned Romanian-Hungarian war began. The Conducător had also created an intra-Axis alliance against Hungary along with Croatia and Slovakia.

As the Soviet Union recovered from the initial shock and slowed down the Axis offensive at the Battle of Moscow (October 1941 – January 1942), Romania was asked by its allies to contribute a larger number of troops. A decisive factor in Antonescu's compliance with the request appears to have been a special visit to Bucharest by Wehrmacht chief of staff Wilhelm Keitel, who introduced the Conducător to Hitler's plan for attacking the Caucasus. The Romanian force engaged in the war reportedly exceeded German demands. It came to around 500,000 troops and thirty actively involved divisions. As a sign of his satisfaction, Hitler presented his Romanian counterpart with a luxury car. On 7 December 1941, after reflecting on the possibility for Romania, Hungary and Finland to change their stance, the British government responded to repeated Soviet requests and declared war on all three countries. Following Japan's attack on Pearl Harbor and in compliance with its Axis commitment, Romania declared war on the United States within five days. These developments contrasted with Antonescu's own statement of 7 December: "I am an ally of the [German] Reich against [the Soviet Union], I am neutral in the conflict between Great Britain and Germany. I am for America against the Japanese."

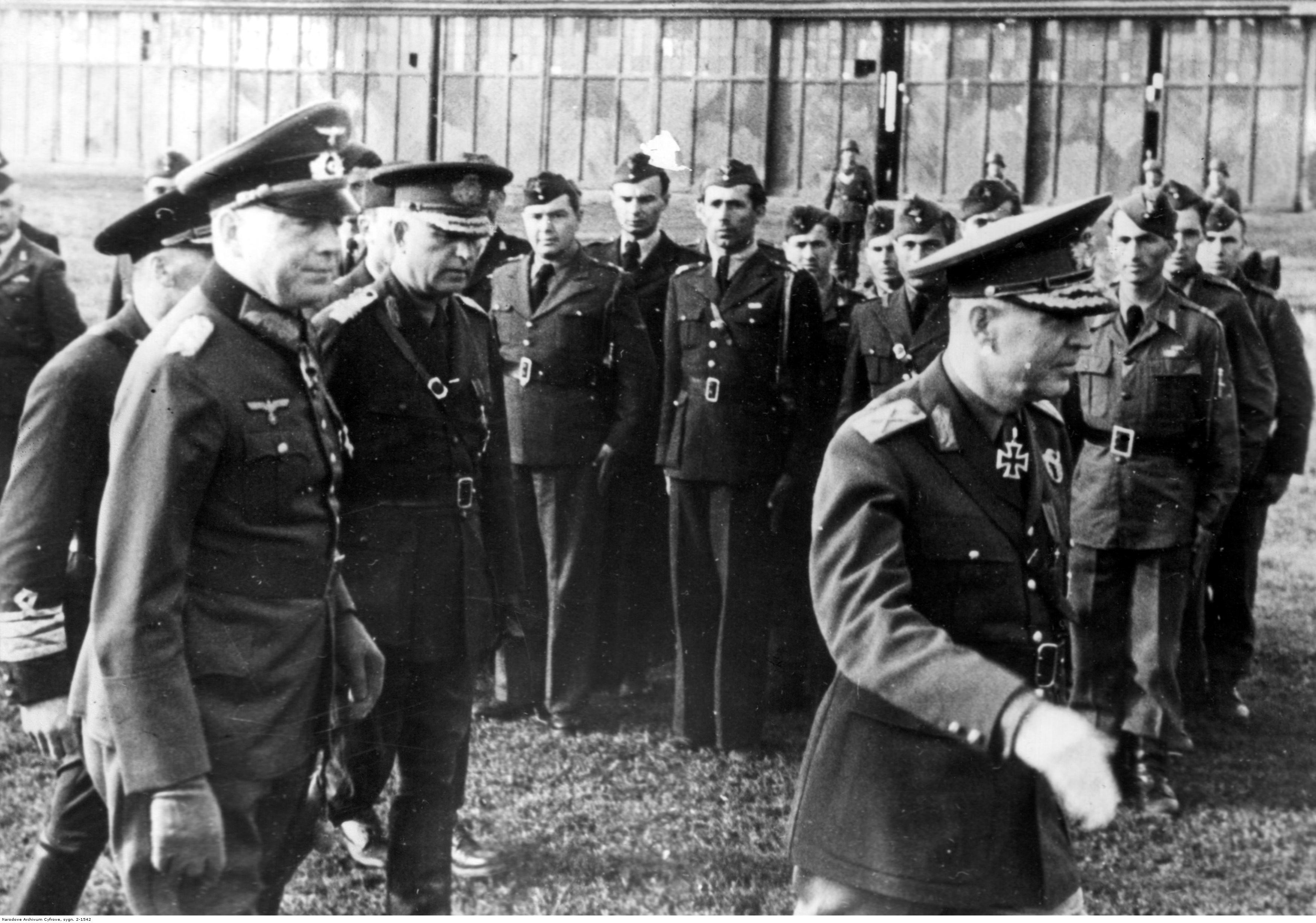
Antonescu arrives at the front with General Ewald von Kleist in June 1942, during the Axis summer offensive Case Blue

A crucial change in the war came with the Battle of Stalingrad in June 1942 – February 1943, a major defeat for the Axis. Romania's armies alone lost some 150,000 men (either dead, wounded or captured) and more than half of the country's divisions were wiped out. The loss of two entire Romanian armies who all either killed or captured by the Soviets produced a major crisis in German-Romanian relations in the winter of 1943 with many people in the Romanian government for the first time questioning the wisdom of fighting on the side of the Axis. Outside of the elites, by 1943 the continuing heavy losses on the Eastern Front, anger at the contempt which the Wehrmacht treated their Romanian allies and declining living standards within Romania made the war unpopular with the Romanian people, and consequently the Conducător himself. The American historian Gerhard Weinberg wrote that: "The string of broken German promises of equipment and support, the disregard of warnings about Soviet offensive preparations, the unfriendly treatment of retreating Romanian units by German officers and soldiers and the general German tendency to blame their own miscalculations and disasters on their allies all combined to produce a real crisis in German-Romanian relations." For part of that interval, the Marshal had withdrawn from public life, owing to an unknown affliction, which is variously rumoured to have been a mental breakdown, a foodborne illness or a symptom of the syphilis he had contracted earlier in life. He is known to have been suffering from digestive problems, treating himself with food prepared by Helene von Exner, an Austrian-born dietitian who moved into Hitler's service after 1943.

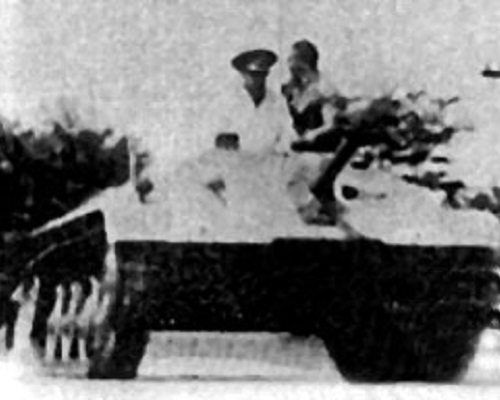
The Mareșal tank destroyer, named after Marshal Antonescu, who was involved in its development. It later inspired the German Hetzer

Upon his return, Antonescu blamed the Romanian losses on German overseer Arthur Hauffe, whom Hitler agreed to replace. In parallel with the military losses, Romania was confronted with large-scale economic problems. Romania's oil was the Reich's only source of natural oil after the invasion of the Soviet Union in June 1941 to August 1944 (Germany also had synthetic oil plants operating from 1942 onwards), and as such for economic reasons, Romania was always treated as a major ally by Hitler. While Germany monopolised Romania's exports, it defaulted on most of its payments. Like all countries whose exports to Germany, particularly in oil, exceeded imports from that country, Romania's economy suffered from Nazi control of the exchange rate. On the German side, those directly involved in harnessing Romania's economic output for German goals were economic planners Hermann Göring and Walther Funk, together with Hermann Neubacher, the Special Representative for Economic Problems. A recurring problem for Antonescu was attempting to obtain payments for all of the oil he shipped to Germany while resisting German demands for increased oil production. The situation was further aggravated in 1942, as USAAF and RAF were able to bomb the oil fields in Prahova County. Official sources from the following period amalgamate military and civilian losses of all kinds, which produces a total of 554,000 victims of the war. To improve the Romanian army's effectiveness, the Mareșal tank destroyer was developed starting in late 1942. Marshal Antonescu, after whom the vehicle was named, was involved in the project himself. The vehicle later influenced the development of the German Hetzer.

In this context, the Romanian leader acknowledged that Germany was losing the war, and he therefore authorised his Deputy Premier and new Foreign Minister Mihai Antonescu to set up contacts with the Allies. In early 1943, Antonescu authorised his diplomats to contact British and American diplomats in Portugal and Switzerland to see if were possible for Romania to sign an armistice with the Western powers. The Romanian diplomats were informed that no armistice was possible until an armistice was signed with the Soviet Union, a condition Antonescu rejected. In parallel, he allowed the PNȚ and the PNL to engage in parallel talks with the Allies at various locations in neutral countries. The discussions were strained by the Western Allies' call for an unconditional surrender, over which the Romanian envoys bargained with Allied diplomats in Sweden and Egypt (among them the Soviet representatives Nikolai Novikov and Alexandra Kollontai). Antonescu was also alarmed by the possibility of war being carried on Romanian territory, as had happened in Italy after Operation Avalanche. The events also prompted hostile negotiations aimed at toppling Antonescu, and involving the two political parties, the young monarch, diplomats and soldiers. A major clash between Michael and Antonescu took place during the first days of 1943, when the 21-year-old monarch used his New Year's address on national radio to part with the Axis war effort.

=== Ousting and arrest ===
In March 1944, the Soviet Red Army broke the Southern Bug and Dniester fronts, advancing on Bessarabia. This came just as Field Marshal Henry Maitland Wilson, the British Supreme Allied Commander of the Mediterranean theatre, presented Antonescu with an ultimatum. After a new visit to Germany and a meeting with Hitler, Antonescu opted to continue fighting alongside the remaining Axis states, a decision which he later claimed was motivated by Hitler's promise to allow Romania possession of Northern Transylvania in the event of an Axis victory. Upon his return, the Conducător oversaw a counteroffensive which stabilised the front on a line between Iași and Chișinău to the north and the lower Dniester to the east. This normalised his relations with Nazi German officials, whose alarm over the possible loss of an ally had resulted in the Margarethe II plan, an adapted version of the Nazi takeover in Hungary.

However, Antonescu's non-compliance with the terms of Wilson's ultimatum also had drastic effects on Romania's ability to exit the war. By then, Antonescu was conceiving of a separate peace with the Western Allies, while maintaining contacts with the Soviets. In parallel, the mainstream opposition movement came to establish contacts with the Romanian Communist Party (PCR), which, although minor numerically, gained importance for being the only political group to be favoured by Soviet leader Joseph Stalin. On the PCR side, the discussions involved Lucrețiu Pătrășcanu and later Emil Bodnăraș. Another participating group at this stage was the old Romanian Social Democratic Party.

Large-scale Allied bombings of Bucharest took place in spring 1944, while the Soviet Red Army approached Romanian borders. The Battle for Romania began in late summer: while German commanders Johannes Frießner and Otto Wöhler of the Army Group South Ukraine attempted to hold Bukovina, Soviet Steppe Front leader Rodion Malinovsky stormed into the areas of Moldavia defended by Petre Dumitrescu's troops. In reaction, Antonescu attempted to stabilise the front on a line between Focșani, Nămoloasa and Brăila, deep inside Romanian territory. On 5 August, he visited Hitler one final time in Kętrzyn. On this occasion, the German leader reportedly explained that his people had betrayed the Nazi cause, and asked him if Romania would go on fighting (to which Antonescu reportedly answered in vague terms). After Soviet Foreign Minister Vyacheslav Molotov more than once stated that the Soviet Union was not going to require Romanian subservience, the factions opposing Antonescu agreed that the moment had come to overthrow him, by carrying out the Royal Coup of 23 August. On that day, the sovereign asked Antonescu to meet him in the Royal Palace, where he presented him with a request to take Romania out of its Axis alliance. The Conducător refused, and was promptly arrested by soldiers of the guard, being replaced as Premier with General Constantin Sănătescu, who presided over a national government.

The new Romanian authorities declared peace with the Allies and advised the population to greet Soviet troops. On 25 August, as Bucharest was successfully defending itself against German retaliations, Romania declared war on Nazi Germany. The events disrupted German domination in the Balkans, putting a stop to the Maibaum offensive against Yugoslav Partisans. The coup was nevertheless a unilateral move, and, until the signature of an armistice on 12 September, the country was still perceived as an enemy by the Soviets, who continued to take Romanian soldiers as prisoners of war. In parallel, Hitler reactivated the Iron Guardist exile, creating a Sima-led government in exile that did not survive the war's end in Europe.

Placed in the custody of PCR militants, Antonescu spent the interval at a house in Bucharest's Vatra Luminoasă quarter. He was afterward handed to the Soviet occupation forces, who transported him to Moscow, together with his deputy Mihai Antonescu, Governor of Transnistria Gheorghe Alexianu, defence minister Constantin Pantazi, Gendarmerie commander Constantin Vasiliu and Bucharest Police chief Mircea Elefterescu. They were subsequently kept in luxurious detention at a mansion nearby the city, and guarded by SMERSH, a special counter-intelligence body answering directly to Stalin. Shortly after Germany surrendered in May 1945, the group was moved to Lubyanka prison. There, Antonescu was interrogated and reputedly pressured by SMERSH operatives, among them Viktor Abakumov, but transcripts of their conversations were never sent back to Romania by the Soviet authorities. Later research noted that the main issues discussed were the German-Romanian alliance, the war on the Soviet Union, the economic toll on both countries, and Romania's participation in the Holocaust (defined specifically as crimes against "peaceful Soviet citizens"). At some point during this period, Antonescu attempted suicide in his quarters. He was returned to Bucharest in spring 1946 and held in Jilava Prison. He was subsequently interrogated by prosecutor Avram Bunaciu, to whom he complained about the conditions of his detainment, contrasting them with those in Moscow, while explaining that he was a vegetarian and demanding a special diet.

== Ideology ==
=== Ethnic nationalism and expansionism ===
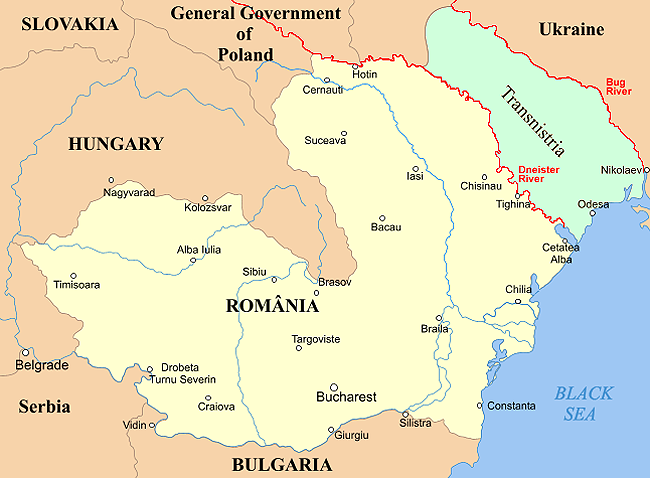
Romania in 1942: Northern Transylvania was ceded to Hungary, Southern Dobruja to Bulgaria, and Transnistria became a governorate under Romanian administration

Antonescu's policies were motivated, in large part, by ethnic nationalism. A firm believer in the restoration of Greater Romania as the union of lands inhabited by ethnic Romanians, he never reconciled himself to Hungary's incorporation of Northern Transylvania. Although Hungary and Romania were technically allied through the Axis system, their relationship was always tense, and marked by serious diplomatic incidents. The Romanian leader kept contacts with representatives of ethnic Romanian communities directly affected by the Second Vienna Award, including Transylvanian Greek-Catholic clergy. Another aspect of Antonescu's nationalist policies was evidenced after the Balkans Campaign. Antonescu's Romania did not partake in the military action, but laid a claim to the territories in eastern Vojvodina (western Banat) and the Timok Valley, home to a sizeable Romanian community. Reportedly, Germany's initial designs of granting Vojvodina to Hungary enhanced the tensions between Antonescu and Miklós Horthy to the point where war between the two countries became a possibility. Such incidents made Germany indefinitely prolong its occupation of the region. The Romanian authorities issued projects for an independent Macedonia with autonomy for its Aromanian communities, while an official memorandum on the Timok Valley, approved by Antonescu, made mention of "Romanian" areas "from Timok [...] to Salonika". The Conducător also maintained contacts with Aromanian fascists in Axis-occupied Greece, awarding refuge to Alcibiades Diamandi and Nicola Matussi of the Roman Legion, whose pro-Romanian policies had brought them into conflict with other Aromanian factions.

Conducător Antonescu thought Hitler willing to revise his stance on Northern Transylvania, and claimed to have obtained the German leader's agreement, using it to justify participation on the Eastern Front after the recovery of Bessarabia. However, transcripts of the Hitler-Antonescu conversations do not validate his interpretation. Another version has it that Hitler sent Antonescu a letter informing him that Bessarabia's political status still ultimately depended on German decisions. In one of his letters to Hitler, Antonescu himself stated his anti-communist ideological motivation: "I confirm that I will pursue operations in the east to the end against that great enemy of civilization, of Europe, and of my country: Russian Bolshevism [...] I will not be swayed by anyone not to extend this military cooperation into new territory." Antonescu's ideological perspective blended national sentiment with generically Christian and particularly Romanian Orthodox traits. British historian Arnold D. Harvey writes that while this ideology seems a poor match with Nazi doctrine, especially its anti-religious elements, "It seems that Hitler was not even perturbed by the militant Christian orientation of the Antonescu regime".

It is also possible that, contrary to Antonescu's own will, Hitler viewed the transfer of Transnistria as compensation for the Transylvanian areas, and that he therefore considered the matter closed. According to the Romanian representative in Berlin, Raoul Bossy, various German and Hungarian officials recommended the extension of permanent Romanian rule into Transnistria, as well as into Podolia, Galicia and Pokuttya, in exchange for delivering the whole of Transylvania to Hungary (and relocating its ethnic Romanian majority to the new provinces). American political scientist Charles King writes: "There was never any attempt to annex the occupied territory [of Transnistria], for it was generally considered by the Romanian government to be a temporary buffer zone between Greater Romania and the Soviet front line." At his 1946 trial, Antonescu claimed that Transnistria had been occupied to prevent Romania being caught in a "pincer" between Germany's Drang nach Osten and the Volksdeutsch communities to the east, while denying charges of having exploited the region for Romania's benefit.

Romanian historian Lucian Boia believes that Antonescu may have nevertheless had expansionist goals to the east, and that he implicitly understood Operation Barbarossa as a tool for containing Slavic peoples. Similar verdicts are provided by other researchers. Another Romanian historian, Ottmar Trașcă, argues that Antonescu did not wish to annex the region "at least until the end of the war", but notes that Antonescu's own statements make reference to its incorporation in the event of a victory. In addition to early annexation plans to the Southern Bug (reportedly confessed to Bossy in June 1941), the Conducător is known to have presented his ministers with designs for the region's colonization. The motivation he cited was alleged malnutrition among Romanian peasants, to which he added: "I'll take this population, I'll lead it into Transnistria, where I shall give it all the land it requires". Several nationalists sympathetic to Antonescu acclaimed the extension of Romanian rule into Transnistria, which they understood as permanent.

=== Antisemitism and antiziganism ===
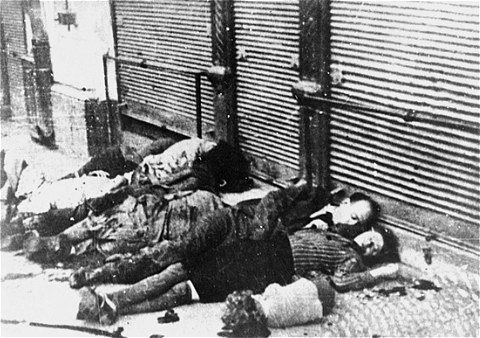
Iași pogrom in Romania, June 1941

A recurring element in Antonescu's doctrines is racism, and in particular antisemitism. This was linked to his sympathy for ethnocratic ideals, and complemented by his statements in favour of "integral nationalism" and "Romanianism". Like other far right Romanians, he saw a Jewish presence behind liberal democracy, and believed in the existence of Judeo-Masonry. His earliest thoughts on Codreanu's ideology criticise the Legionary leader for advocating "brutal measures" in dealing with the "invasion of Jews", and instead propose "the organization of Romanian classes" as a method for reaching the same objective. Politician Aureliu Weiss, who met General Antonescu during that interval, recalled that, although antisemitic "to the core", he was capable of restraint in public. According to historian Mihail Ionescu, the Conducător was not averse to the Iron Guard's "Legionary principles", but wanted antisemitism to be "applied in an orderly fashion", as opposed to Horia Sima's revolutionary ways. Historian Ioan Scurtu believes that, during the Legionary Rebellion, Antonescu deliberately waited before stepping in, in order for the Guard to be "profoundly discredited" and for himself to be perceived as a "saviour". In April 1941, he let his ministers know that he was considering letting "the mob" deal with the Jews, "and after the slaughter, I will restore order." Lucian Boia notes that the Romanian leader was indeed motivated by antisemitic beliefs, but that these need to be contextualised in order to understand what separates Antonescu from Hitler in terms of radicalism. However, various other researchers assess that, by aligning himself with Hitler before and during Operation Barbarossa, Antonescu implicitly agreed with his thoughts on the "Jewish Question", choosing racial over religious antisemitism. According to Harvey, the Iași pogrom made the Germans "evidently willing to accept that organised Christianity in Romania was very different from what it was in Germany".

Antonescu was a firm believer in the conspiracy theory of "Jewish Bolshevism", according to which all Jews were supporters of communism and the Soviet Union. His arguments on the matter involved a spurious claim that, during the 1940 retreat from Bessarabia, the Jews had organised themselves and attacked Romanian soldiers. In part, this notion exaggerated unilateral reports of enthusiasm among the marginalised Jews upon the arrival of Red Army troops. In a summer 1941 address to his ministers, Antonescu stated: "The Satan is the Jew. [Ours] is a battle of life and death. Either we win and the world will be purified, either they win and we will become their slaves." At around the same time, he envisaged the ethnic cleansing ("cleaning out") of Jews from the eastern Romanian-held territories. However, as early as February 1941, Antonescu was also contemplating the ghettoization of all Jewish Romanians, as an early step toward their expulsion. In this context, Antonescu frequently depicted Jews as a disease or a poison. After the Battle of Stalingrad, he encouraged the army commanders to resist the counteroffensive, as otherwise the Soviets "will bring Bolshevism to the country, wipe out the entire leadership stratum, impose the Jews on us, and deport masses of our people."

Ion Antonescu's antiziganism manifested itself as the claim that some or all Romani people, specifically nomadic ones, were given to criminal behaviour. The regime did not act consistently on this belief: in various cases, those deported had close relatives drafted into the Romanian Army. Although racist slogans targeting Romani people had been popularised by the Iron Guard, it was only under Antonescu's unchallenged rule that solving the "Gypsy problem" became official policy and antiziganist measures were enforced. After a February 1941 inspection, Antonescu singled out Bucharest's Romani community for alleged offences committed during the blackout, and called on his ministers to present him with solutions. Initially, he contemplated sending all Romani people he considered undesirable to the inhospitable Bărăgan Plain, to join the ranks of a local community of manual labourers. In 1942, he commissioned the Romanian Central Institute for Statistics to compile a report on Romani demography, which, in its edited form, provided scientifically racist conclusions, warning the Conducător about alleged Romani-Romanian miscegenation in rural Romania. In doing so, Antonescu offered some credit to a marginal and pseudoscientific trend in Romanian sociology, which, basing itself on eugenic theories, recommended the marginalization, deportation or compulsory sterilization of the Romani people, whose numeric presence it usually exaggerated. Among those who signed the report was demographer Sabin Manuilă, who saw the Romani presence as a major racial problem. The exact effect of the report's claims on Antonescu is uncertain.

=== Conservatism vs. fascism ===
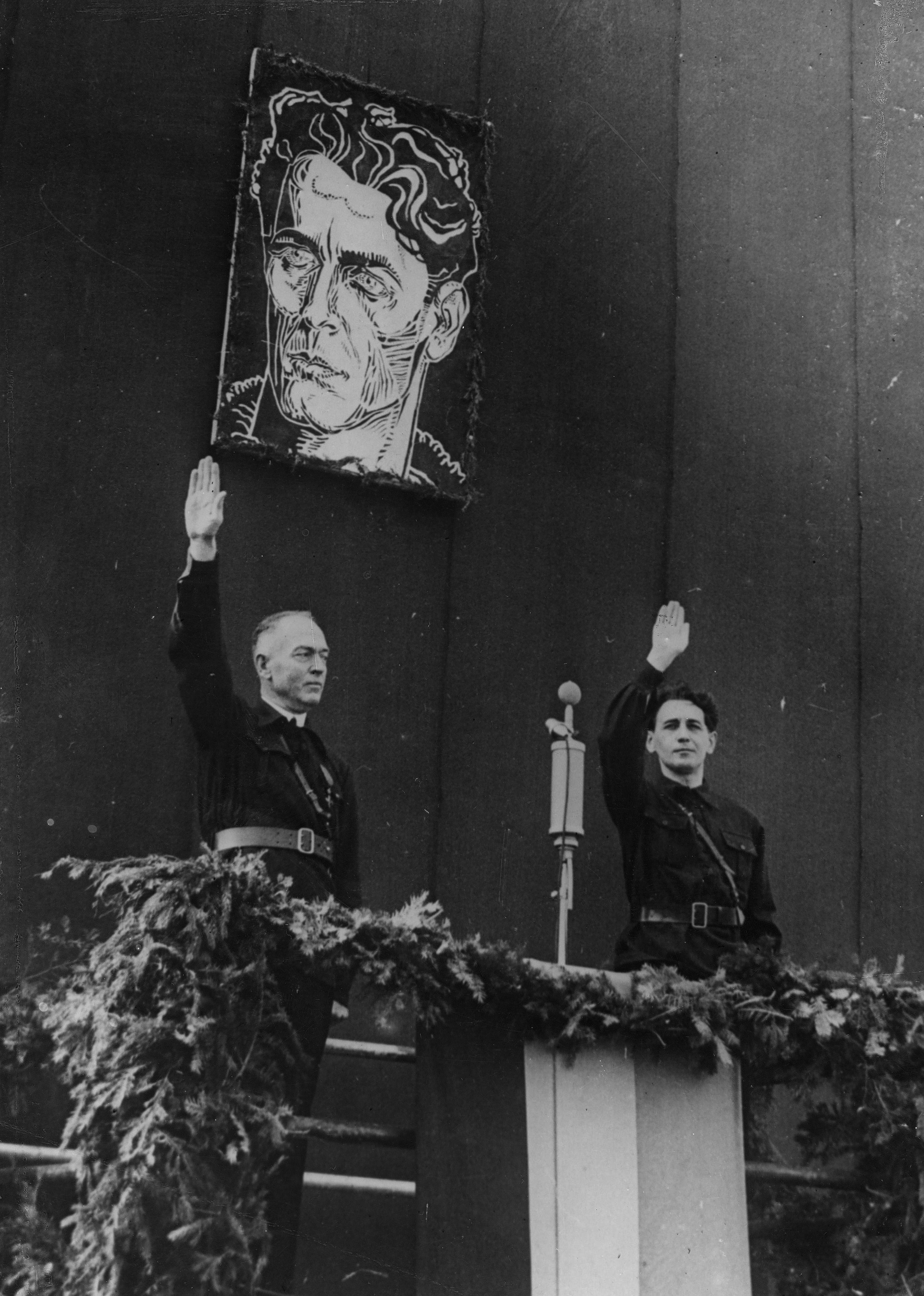
Antonescu (left) sporting an Iron Guard green shirt and displaying the Roman salute together with Horia Sima during a mass rally in October 1940. Historians are divided on whether Romania under Antonescu was a fascist regime or merely a right-wing military dictatorship.

Antonescu's regime is generally characterised as authoritatian conservative with some fascist trappings. Britannica describes the suppression of the Iron Guard as the latter being "crushed by Romanian conservatives." Israeli historian of fascism Zeev Sternhell describes Antonescu, alongside his European counterparts Pierre-Étienne Flandin, Francisco Franco, Miklós Horthy, François de La Rocque, Philippe Pétain and Italian King Victor Emmanuel III, as a "conservative", noting that all of them "were not deceived by a [fascist] propaganda trying to place them in the same category [as the fascist movements]." A similar verdict is provided by German historian of Europe Hagen Schulze, who views Horthy, Franco and the Romanian leader alongside Portugal's Estado Novo theorist António de Oliveira Salazar and Second Polish Republic founder Józef Piłsudski, as rulers of "either purely military dictatorships, or else authoritarian governments run by civilian politicians", and thus a category apart from the leaders of "Fascist states." For Schulze, the defining elements of such governments is the presence of a "conservative establishment" which ensured "social stability" by extending the control of a "traditional state" (thus effectively blocking "revolutionary suggestions" from the far left and the far right alike). The term "conservative autocrat" is used in relation to the Conducător by British political theorist Roger Griffin, who attributes to the Iron Guard the position of a subservient fascist movement, while others identify Antonescu's post-1941 rule as a military rather than a fascist dictatorship. Several other scholars prefer "conservative" as a defining term for Antonescu's policies. Antonescu described himself as "by fate a dictator", and explained that his policies were "militaristic" or, on one occasion, "national-totalitarian".

At the same time, historians recognise fascist elements performed by Antonescu in his dictatorship, similarly to the other authoritarian conservative European leaders of his day. American historian of fascism Robert Paxton calls Antonescu's repression of the Iron Guard "the most extreme example" "of a conservative repression of fascism" and thus characterises the regime as conservative, "nonfascist military dictatorship" with a "thin veneer of fascist trappings"; he also notes that, like Salazar, Romania's dictator crushed a competing fascist movement, "after copying some of [its] techniques of popular mobilization." Routledge's 2002 Companion to Fascism and the Far Right uses the term "para-fascism", a "form of right-wing politics that looks like fascism but is not really all that fascist beneath the surface", to define Antonescu, adding: "generally regarded as an authoritarian conservative, [Antonescu] incorporated fascism into his regime, in the shape of the Iron Guard, rather than embodying fascism himself." "Para-fascist" is also used by Griffin, to denote both Antonescu and Carol II. British historian Dennis Deletant, who notes that the fascist label relies on both Antonescu's adoption of some fascist "trappings" and the "dichotomy of wartime and postwar evaluation" of his regime, also notes that post-1960 interpretations "do more to explain his behaviour than the preceding orthodoxy." Deletant contrasts the lack of "mass political party or ideology" with the type of rule associated with Nazism or Italian fascism. British-born sociologist and political analyst Michael Mann writes: "The authoritarian regimes of Antonescu [...] and Franco [...] purported to be 'traditional', but actually their fascist-derived corporatism was a new immanent ideology of the right." References to the fascist traits of Antonescu's dictatorship are also made by other researchers.

Still, the label "fascist" may be found applied to Antonescu in literature. Political scientists John Gledhill and Charles King discuss the Iron Guard as Romania's "indigenous fascist movement", remark that Antonescu "adopted much of the ideology of the Guardists", and conclude that the regime he led was "openly fascist". Romanian-born historian of ideas Juliana Geran Pilon, who describes Romania's "military fascist regime" as a successor to Iron Guardist "mystical nationalism", while mentioning that Antonescu's "national ideology was rather more traditionally militaristic and conservative."

=== Power base, administration and propaganda ===
Commemorative stamp issued after the Siege of Odessa, with the profiles of Romanian Army and Wehrmacht soldiers over a slogan reading Războiul sfânt contra bolșevismului ("The Holy War against Bolshevism")

In theory, Antonescu's policies had at least one revolutionary aspect. The leader himself claimed: "I want to introduce a patriotic, heroic, military-typed education, because economic education and all the others follow from it". According to Boia, his arrival in power was explicitly meant to "regenerate" Romania, and his popularity hinged on his being perceived as a "totalitarian model" and a "saviour" figure, like Corneliu Zelea Codreanu and Carol II before him. The "providential" and "saviour" themes are also emphasised by historian Adrian Majuru, who notes that Antonescu both adopted such ideals and criticised Carol for failing to live up to them. Seeing his rule as legitimised by the national interest, the general is also known to have referred to political pluralism as poltronerie ("poltroonishness"). Accordingly, Antonescu formally outlawed all political forces in February 1941, codifying penal labour as punishment for most public forms of political expression. In Deletant's assessment, his regenerative program was more declarative than factual, and contradicted by Antonescu's own decision to allow the informal existence of some opposition forces. At the same time, some historians believe his monopolizing of power in the name of a German alliance turned Romania into either a "puppet state" of Hitler or one of Germany's "satellite" governments. However, Deletant notes: "Romania retained her sovereignty throughout the period of the alliance [with Nazi Germany]. [...] Antonescu had, of course, his own country's interests uppermost in his mind, but in following Hitler, he served the Nazi cause." He describes Romania's contribution to the war as that of "a principal ally of Germany", as opposed to a "minor Axis satellite."

Among the institutions Antonescu relied on was the Orthodox Church, which worked "harmoniously" with the regime. Antonescu used its popular appeal to bolster the support for himself, referring to the war with the USSR as a "holy war"; the clergy, in their turn, supported the "holy war" against "Bolshevism", "the sick ideas of Lenin, Trotsky, and the gang" produced by the "international Judeo-masonic finance". The Church participated in "Christianization" of the populace of the occupied terrotories of the USSR, claiming to spread Christian values and building churches and recruiting priests as the populace was eliminated or worked and starved to death. It contributed to the Holocaust, deciding whom to label a "Jew" or a "Christian".

Although he assigned an unimportant role to King Michael, Antonescu took steps to increase the monarchy's prestige, personally inviting Carol's estranged wife, Queen Mother Helen, to return home. However, his preferred military structures functioned in cooperation with a bureaucracy inherited from the National Renaissance Front. According to historian of fascism Philip Morgan: "Antonescu probably wanted to create, or perpetuate, something like Carol's front organization." Much of his permanent support base comprised former National Christian Party members, to the point where he was seen as successor to Octavian Goga. While maintaining a decorative replacement for Parliament—known as Adunarea Obștească Plebiscitară a Națiunii Române ("The General Plebiscitary Assembly of the Romanian Nation") and convoked only twice — he took charge of hierarchical appointments, and personally drafted new administrative projects. In 1941, he disestablished participative government in localities and counties, replacing it with a corporatist structure appointed by prefects whom he named. In stages between August and October 1941, he instituted civilian administration of Transnistria under Governor Gheorghe Alexianu, whose status he made equivalent to that of a cabinet minister. Similar measures were taken in Bukovina and Bessarabia (under Governors Corneliu Calotescu and Gheorghe Voiculescu, respectively). Antonescu strictly relied on the chain of command, and his direct orders to the Army overrode civilian hierarchies. This system allowed room for endemic political corruption and administrative confusion. The Romanian leader also tolerated a gradual loss of authority over the German communities in Romania, in particular the Transylvanian Saxon and Banat Swabian groups, in agreement with Hitler's views on the Volksdeutsche. This trend was initiated by Saxon Nazi activist Andreas Schmidt in cooperation with the Volksdeutsche Mittelstelle, resulting in de facto self-governance under a Nazi system which was also replicated among the 130,000 Black Sea Germans of Transnistria. Many young German Romanian men opted to join the Schutzstaffel as early as 1940 and, in 1943, an accord between Antonescu and Hitler automatically sent ethnic Germans of recruitable age into the Wehrmacht.

The regime was characterised by the leader's attempts to regulate even remote aspects of public life, including relations between the sexes. He imposed drastic penalties for misdemeanors, and the legal use of capital punishment was extended to an unprecedented level. He personally set standards for nightclub programs, for the length of skirts and for women's use of bicycles, while forcing all men to wear coats in public. His wife Maria was a patron of state-approved charitable organizations, initially designed to compete with successful Iron Guardist ventures such as Ajutorul Legionar. According to Romanian-born gender studies academic Maria Bucur, although the regime allowed women "to participate in the war effort on the front in a more regularised, if still marginal, fashion", the general tone was sexist.

The administrative apparatus included official press and propaganda sectors, which moved rapidly from constructing Carol's personality cult to doing the same for the new military leader: journals Universul and Timpul, as well as Camil Petrescu's România magazine, were particularly active in this process. Some other such venues were Porunca Vremii, Nichifor Crainic's Sfarmă-Piatră, as well as all the seemingly independent newspapers and some ten new periodicals the government founded for this purpose. Among the individual journalists involved in propaganda were Crainic, Petrescu, Stelian Popescu, and Curentul editor Pamfil Șeicaru (the Conducător purposefully ignored support from Carol's former adviser, corporatist economist and newspaperman Mihail Manoilescu, whom he reportedly despised). Much of the propaganda produced during the Antonescu era supported the antisemitic theses put forth by the Conducător. Antisemitism was notable and virulent at the level of Romanian Army units addressing former Soviet citizens in occupied lands, and reflected the regime's preference for the ethnic slur jidani (akin to "kikes" or "Yids" in English). The religious aspect of anti-communism surfaced in such venues, which frequently equated Operation Barbarossa with a holy war or a crusade. Romania's other enemies were generally treated differently: Antonescu himself issued objections to the anti-British propaganda of explicitly pro-Nazi papers such as Porunca Vremii. A special segment of Antonescu's post-1941 propaganda was Codrenist: it revisited the Iron Guard's history to minimise Sima's contributions and to depict him as radically different from Codreanu.

== Antonescu and The Holocaust ==
=== Iași pogrom ===
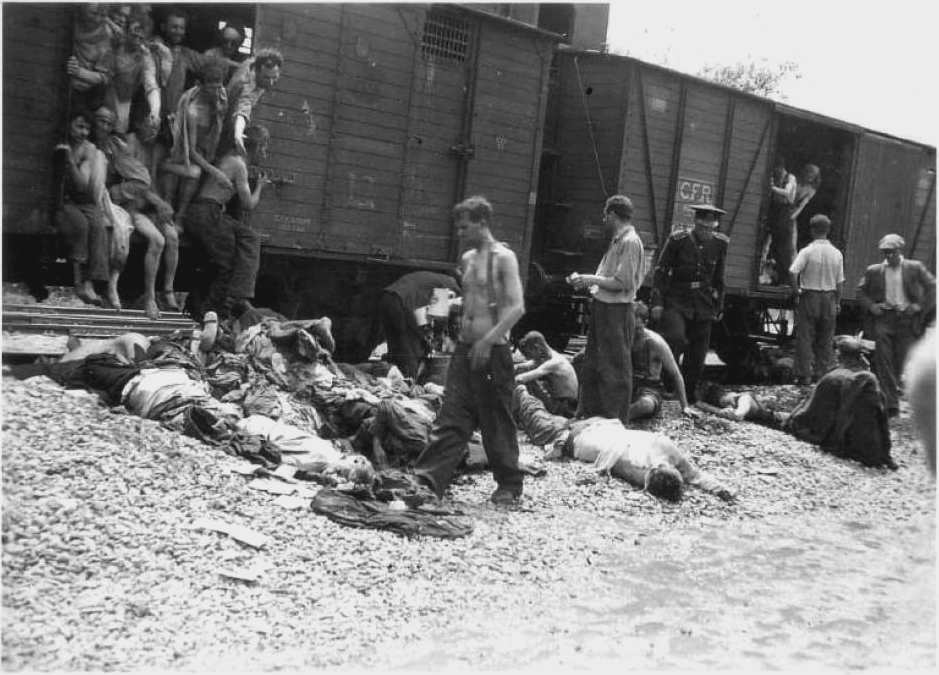
One of the "death trains" formed in the wake of the Iași pogrom, stopping to unload the dead

Three weeks after gaining power and inaugurating the National Legionary regime, Antonescu declared to Italian interviewers at La Stampa that solving the "Jewish Question" was his pressing concern, and that he considered himself "haunted" by the large Jewish presence in Moldavian towns. Antonescu's crimes against the Jewish population were inaugurated by new racial discrimination laws: urban Jewish property was expropriated, Jews were banned from performing a wide range of occupations and forced to provide community work for the state (muncă de interes obștesc) instead of the inaccessible military service, mixed Romanian-Jewish marriages were forbidden and many Jews, primarily those from strategic areas such as Ploiești, were confined to internment camps. The expulsion of Jewish professionals from all walks of life was also carried out in the National Legionary period, and enforced after the Legionary Rebellion. After a post-Legionary hiatus, "Romanianization" commissions resumed their work under the supervision of a National Centre, and their scope was extended.

Often discussed as a prelude to the Holocaust in Romania and in connection with Antonescu's views on "Jewish Bolshevism", the Iași pogrom occurred just days after the start of Operation Barbarossa, and was partly instigated, partly tolerated by the authorities in Bucharest. For a while before the massacre, these issued propaganda claiming that the Jews in Iași, whose numbers had been increased by forced evictions from smaller localities, were actively helping Soviet bombers find their targets through the blackout and plotting against the authorities, with Antonescu himself ordering that the entire community be expelled from the city on such grounds. The discourse appealed to local antisemites, whose murderous rampage, carried out with the officials' complicity, resulted in several thousand deaths among Jewish men, women and children.

In the aftermath of the pogrom, thousands of survivors were loaded into the so-called "death trains". These overcrowded and sealed Romanian Railways cattle wagons circled the countryside in the extreme heat of the summer, and periodically stopped to unload the dead. At least 4,000 people died during the initial massacre and the subsequent transports. Varied estimates of the Iași massacre and related killings place the total number of Jews killed at 8,000, 10,000, 12,000 or 14,000. Some assistance in their murder was provided by units of the German XXXth Army Corps, a matter which later allowed the authorities to shift blame from themselves and from Antonescu—who was nonetheless implicated by the special orders he had released. The complicity of the Special Intelligence Service and its director Eugen Cristescu was also advanced as a possibility. The subsequent attempts at a cover-up included omissive explanations given by the central authorities to foreign diplomats and rewriting official records.

=== Transnistria ===
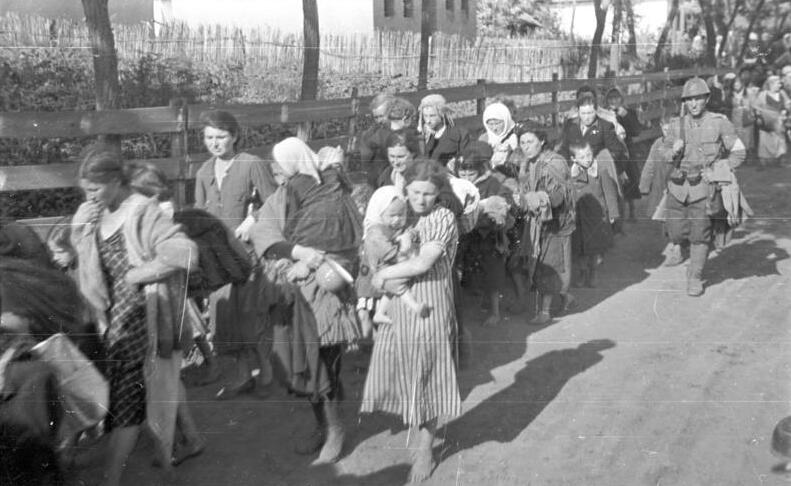
Romanian soldiers participating in the deportation of Jewish families (German photograph, July 1941)

Right upon setting up camp in Bessarabia and Northern Bukovina, Romanian troops joined the Wehrmacht and the Schutzstaffel-organised Einsatzgruppen in mass shootings of Bessarabian and Ukrainian Jews, resulting in the deaths of 10,000 to 20,000 people. Scholar Christopher R. Browning compares these killings with similar atrocities perpetrated by locals in Reichskommissariat Ukraine, Lithuania and Latvia. From then on, as the fighting troops progressed over the Dniester, the local administration deported large numbers of Jews into the fighting zone, in hopes that they would be exterminated by the Germans. Antonescu himself stated: "I am in favour of expelling the Jews from Bessarabia and [Northern] Bukovina to the other side of the border [...]. There is nothing for them to do here and I don't mind if we appear in history as barbarians [...]. There has never been a time more suitable in our history to get rid of the Jews, and if necessary, you are to make use of machine guns against them." He also explained that his aim was: "the policy of purification of the Romanian race, and I will not give way before any obstacle in achieving this historical goal of our nation. If we do not take advantage of the situation which presents itself today [...] we shall miss the last chance that history offers to us. And I do not wish to miss it, because if I do so further generations will blame me." He made a contradictory statement about the murder of Jews in Chișinău, claiming that their perpetrators were "bastards" who "stained" his regime's reputation. Antonescu saw the "war" against the Jews as being just as important as the war against the Soviet Union, and regularly demanded reports from his officers in Bessarabia and Transnistria about their measures against the Jews. In late August 1941, in Tighina, Antonescu called a secret conference attended by himself, the governors of Bessarabia and Bukovina and the governor-designate of Transnistria to discuss his plans regarding the Jews in those regions.

Many deaths followed, as the direct results of starvation and exhaustion, while the local German troops carried out selective shootings. The survivors were sent back over the river, and the German commanders expressed irritation over the methods applied by their counterparts. Romanian authorities subsequently introduced ghettos or transit camps. After the annexation of Transnistria, there ensued a systematic deportation of Jews from Bessarabia, with additional transports of Jews from the Old Kingdom (especially Moldavia-proper). Based on an assignment Antonescu handed down to General Ioan Topor, the decision involved specific quotas, and the transports, most of which were carried out by foot, involved random murders. In conjunction with Antonescu's expansionist ambitions, it is possible that the ultimate destination for the survivors, once circumstances permitted it, was further east than the Southern Bug. On 11 October 1941, the chief of the Federation of Jewish Communities, Wilhelm Filderman issued a public letter to Antonescu asking him to stop the deportations, writing: "This is death, death for no reason except that they are Jews." Antonescu replied to Filderman in a long letter explaining that because the entire Jewish community of Bessarabia had allegedly collaborated with the Soviets during the Soviet occupation of Bessarabia, his policies were a justified act of revenge. On 11 November 1941, Antonescu sent Filderman a second letter stating no Jews would be allowed to live in the "liberated territories" and as for the Jews of the Regat:

We decided to defend our Romanian rights because our all-too-tolerant past was taken advantage of by the Jews and facilitated the abuse of our rights by foreigners, particularly the Jews...We are determined to put an end to this situation. We cannot afford to put in jeopardy the existence of our nation because of several hundred thousand Jews, or in order to salvage some principle of humane democracy that has not been understood properly."

The deportees' remaining property was nationalised, confiscated or left available for plunder. With its own Jewish population confined and subjected to extermination, Transnistria became infamous in short time, especially so for its five main concentration camps: Pechora, Akhmechetka, Bogdanovka, Domanovka and Obodovka. Manned by Romanian Gendarmes and local Ukrainian auxiliaries who acted with the consent of central authorities, Transnistrian localities became the sites of mass executions, particularly after the administrators became worried about the spread of typhus from the camps and into the surrounding region. At a Cabinet meeting on 16 December 1941 to discuss the fate of the Jews of Transnistria, Antonescu stated:

The question of the Yids is being discussed in Berlin. The Germans want to bring the Yids from Europe to Russia and settle them in certain areas, but there is still time before this plan is carried out. Meanwhile, what should we do? Shall we wait for a decision in Berlin? Shall we wait for a decision that concerns us? Shall we ensure their safety? Pack them into catacombs! Throw them into the Black Sea! As far I am concerned, 100 may die, 1,000 may die, all of them may die"

Between 21–24 and 28–31 December 1941, Romanian gendarmes and Ukrainian auxiliaries killed about 70,000 Jews at the Bogdanovca camp; the massacre was Antonescu's way of dealing with a typhus epidemic that had broken out among the Jews of Transnistria owing to the poor living conditions that had been forced to endure. The last wave of Jewish deportations, occurring in June 1942, came mainly from the Cernăuți area in Northern Bukovina.

Also in the summer of 1942, Antonescu became a perpetrator of the Porajmos, or Holocaust-related crimes against the Romani people, when he ordered the Transnistrian deportation of Romanian Romani from the Old Kingdom, transited through camps and resettled in inhumane conditions near the Southern Bug. They were joined there by 2,000 conscientious objectors of the Inochentist church, a millennialist denomination. As Antonescu admitted during his trial, he personally supervised these operations, giving special orders to the Gendarmerie commanders. In theory, the measures taken against Romani people were supposed to affect only nomads and those with a criminal record created or updated recently, but arbitrary exceptions were immediately made to this rule, in particular by using the vague notion of "undesirable" to define some members of sedentary communities. The central authorities noted differences in the criteria applied locally, and intervened to prevent or sanction under-deportation and, in some cases, over-deportation. Antonescu and Constantin Vasiliu had been made aware of the problems Transnistria faced in feeding its own population, but ignored them when deciding in favour of expulsion. With most of their property confiscated, the Romani men, women and children were only allowed to carry hand luggage, on which they were supposed to survive winter. Famine and disease ensued from criminal negligence, Romani survival being largely dependent on occasional government handouts, the locals' charity, stealing and an underground economy. Once caught, escapees who made their way back into Romania were returned by the central authorities, even as local authorities were objecting.

=== Odessa massacre ===
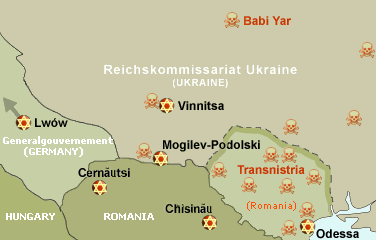
Map of the Holocaust in Ukraine. Odessa ghetto marked with gold-red star. Transnistria massacres marked with red skulls.

The Odessa massacre, an act of collective punishment carried out by the Romanian Army and Gendarmes, took the lives of a minimum of between 15,000 and 25,000 to as many as 40,000 or even more than 50,000 Jewish people of all ages. The measure came as the enforcement of Antonescu's own orders, as retaliation for an explosion that killed 67 people at Romanian headquarters on that city. Antonescu believed that the original explosion was a terrorist act, rejecting the possibility of the building in question having been fitted with land mines by the retreating Soviets. In addition, Antonescu blamed the Jews, specifically "Jewish commissars" in the Red Army, for the losses suffered by his 4th Army throughout the siege, although both an inquiry he had ordered and German assessments pointed to the ill-preparedness of Romanian soldiers. While the local command took the initiative for the first executions, Antonescu's personal intervention amplified the number of victims required, and included specific quotas (200 civilians for every dead officer, 100 for every dead soldier). By the time of the explosion, the Jewish population was already rounded up into makeshift ghettos, being made subject to violence and selective murders.

Purportedly the largest single massacre of Jews in the war's history, it involved mass shootings, hangings, acts of immolation and a mass detonation. Antonescu is quoted saying that the Romanian Army's criminal acts were "reprisals, not massacres". Survivors were deported to the nearby settlement of Slobidka, and kept in inhumane conditions. Alexianu himself intervened with Antonescu for a solution to their problems, but the Romanian leader decided he wanted them out of the Odessa area, citing the nearby resistance of Soviet troops in the Siege of Sevastopol as a ferment for similar Jewish activities. His order to Alexianu specified: "Pack them into the catacombs, throw them into the Black Sea, but get them out of Odessa. I don't want to know. A hundred can die, a thousand can die, all of them can die, but I don't want a single Romanian official or officer to die." Defining the presence of Jews in occupied Odessa as "a crime", Antonescu added: "I don't want to stain my activity with such lack of foresight." As a result of this, around 35,000–40,000 Jewish people were deported out of Odessa area and into other sectors of Transnistria. Several thousands were purposefully driven into Berezivka and other areas inhabited by the Black Sea Germans, where Selbstschutz organizations massacred them.

=== Overall death toll and particularities ===
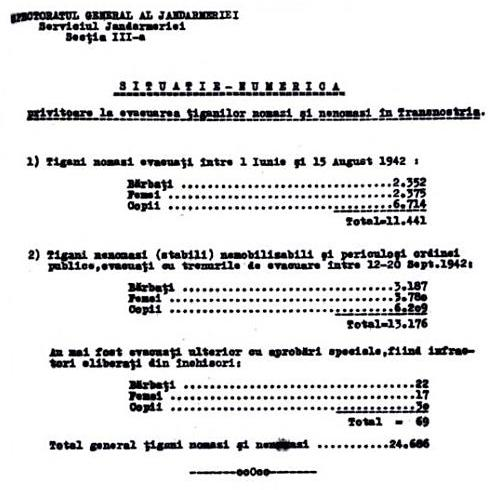
Romanian Gendarmerie report of 1942, accounting for 24,686 Romani deportees to Transnistria

A common assessment ranks Antonescu's Romania as second only to Nazi Germany in its antisemitic extermination policies. According to separate works by historians Dennis Deletant and Adrian Cioroianu, the flaws of Antonescu's 1946 trial notwithstanding, his responsibility for war crimes was such that he would have been equally likely to be found guilty and executed in a Western Allied jurisdiction. The often singular brutality of Romanian-organised massacres was a special topic of reflection for Jewish Holocaust escapee and American political theorist Hannah Arendt, as discussed in her 1963 work Eichmann in Jerusalem. Official Romanian estimates made in 2003 by the Wiesel Commission mention that between 280,000 and 380,000 Jews were killed by Romanian authorities under Antonescu's rule. The Transnistria deportations account for 150,000 to 170,000 individual expulsions of Jews from Romania proper, of whom some 90,000–120,000 never returned. According to Romanian-born Israeli historian Jean Ancel, the Transnistria deportations from other areas account for around 145,000 deaths, while the number of local Transnistrian Jews killed could be as high as 280,000. More conservative estimates for the latter number mention some 130,000–180,000 victims. Other overall estimates speak of 200,000 to over 300,000 Jews purposefully killed as a result of Romania's action. According to historians Antony Polonsky and Joanna B. Michlic: "none of these massacres was carried out by the Germans, although [the latter] certainly encouraged such actions and, in some cases, may have coordinated them." The Romani deportations affected some 25,000 people, at least 11,000 of whom died in Transnistria.

The Jewish population in the Old Kingdom, numbering between 300,000 and 400,000 people, survived the Holocaust almost intact. Reflecting on this fact, Lucian Boia noted that Antonescu could not "decently" be viewed as a rescuer of Jews, but that there still is a fundamental difference between the effects of his rule and those of Hitler's, concluding that the overall picture is not "completely dark." For Dennis Deletant, this situation is a "major paradox" of Antonescu's time in power: "more Jews survived under [Antonescu's] rule than in any other country within Axis Europe." American historian of Romania William O. Oldson views Antonescu's policies as characterised by "violence, inconsistency and inanity", but places them in the wider context of local antisemitism, noting some ideological exceptions from their respective European counterparts. These traits, he argues, became "providential" for the more assimilated Jewish communities of the Old Romanian Kingdom, while exposing Jews perceived as foreign. Discussing Antonescu's policy of ethnic cleansing, Polonksy and Mihlic note: "[it] raises important questions about the thin line between the desire to expel an unwanted minority and a small-scale genocidal project under sanctioned conditions." American military historian Gerhard L. Weinberg made reference to the Antonescu regime's "slaughter of large number of Jews in the areas ceded to the Soviet Union in 1940 when those areas were retaken in 1941 as well as in [...] Transnistria", but commented: "the government of Marshal Ion Antonescu preferred to rob and persecute Jews [from Romania]; the government would not turn them over to the Germans for killing."

Alongside the noticeable change in fortunes on the Eastern Front, a main motivator for all post-1943 changes, noted by various historians, was the manifold financial opportunity of Jewish survival. Wealthier Jews were financially extorted in order to avoid community work and deportation, and the work of some professionals was harnessed by the public sector, and even by the Army. From the beginning, the regime had excepted from deportations some Jews who were experts in fields such as forestry and chemistry, and some others were even allowed to return despite antisemitic protests in their home provinces. Economic exploitation was institutionalised in late 1941-early 1942, with the creation of a Central Jewish Office. Supervised by Commissioner Radu Lecca and formally led by the Jewish intellectuals Nandor Gingold and Henric Streitman, it collected funds which were in part redirected toward Maria Antonescu's charities. Small numbers of Romanian Jews left independently for the Palestine as early as 1941, but British opposition to Zionist plans made their transfer perilous (one notorious example of this being the MV Struma). On a personal level, Antonescu's encouragement of crimes alternated with periods when he gave in to the pleas of Jewish community leader Wilhelm Filderman. In one such instance, he reversed his own 1942 decision to impose the wearing of yellow badges, which nevertheless remained in use everywhere outside the Old Kingdom and, in theory, to any Romanian Jews elsewhere in Axis-controlled Europe. Assessing these contradictions, commentators also mention the effect of Allied promises to prosecute those responsible for genocide throughout Europe. In the late stages of the war, Antonescu was attempting to shift all blame for crimes from his regime while accusing Jews of "bring[ing] destruction upon themselves".

The regime permitted non-deported Romanian Jews and American charities to send humanitarian aid into Transnistrian camps, a measure it took an interest in enforcing in late 1942. Deportations of Jews ceased altogether in October of the same year. A common explanation historians propose for this reassessment of policies is the change in Germany's fortunes on the Eastern Front, with mention that Antonescu was considering using the Jewish population as an asset in his dealings with the Western Allies. It nevertheless took the regime more than a year to allow more selective Jewish returns from Transnistria, including some 2,000 orphans. After Transnistria's 1944 evacuation, Antonescu himself advocated the creation of new camps in Bessarabia. In conversations with his cabinet, the Conducător angrily maintained that surviving Jews were better off than Romanian soldiers.

The policies applied in respect to the Romani population were ambivalent: while ordering the deportation of those he considered criminals, Ion Antonescu was taking some interest in improving the lives of Romani labourers of the Bărăgan Plain. According to Romanian historian Viorel Achim, although it had claimed the existence of a "Gypsy problem", the Antonescu regime "did not count it among its priorities." By 1943, Antonescu was gradually allowing those deported to return home. Initially, Constantin Vasiliu allowed the families of soldiers to appeal their deportation on a selective basis. Romanian authorities also appear to have been influenced by the objections of Nazi administrators in the Reichskommissariat Ukraine, who feared that the newly arrived population would outnumber local Germans. By January 1944, the central authorities ordered local ones not to send back apprehended fugitives, instructed them to provide these with some food and clothing, and suggested corporal punishment for Romani people who did not adhere to a behavioural code. As the Romanian administrators abandoned Transnistria, most survivors from the group returned on their own in summer 1944.

=== Antonescu and the Final Solution projects ===
Ion Antonescu and his subordinates were for long divided on the issue of the Final Solution, as applied in territories under direct Nazi control from 1941. At an early stage, German attempts to impose the RSHA's direct control over Old Kingdom Jews drew some objections from Mihai Antonescu, but the two sides agreed to a common policy with reference to Soviet Jews. In various of his early 1940s statements, Antonescu favourably mentions the Axis goal of eliminating the Jewish presence in the event of victory. The unrestrained character of some Romanian actions toward Jews alarmed Nazi officials, who demanded a methodical form of extermination. When confronted with German decisions to push back Jews he had expelled before the occupation of Transnistria, Antonescu protested, arguing that he had conformed with Hitler's decisions regarding "eastern Jews". In August 1941, in preparation for the Final Solution's universal application, Hitler remarked: "As for the Jewish question, today in any case one could say that a man like Antonescu, for example, proceeds much more radically in this manner than we have done until now. But I will not rest or be idle until we too have gone all the way with the Jews."

By summer 1942, German representatives in Romania obtained Antonescu's approval to deport the remaining Jewish population to extermination camps in occupied Poland. Among those involved on the German side were mass murderer Adolf Eichmann and his aide Gustav Richter, while the Romanian side was represented by Jewish Affairs Commissioner Lecca (reporting to Antonescu himself). Richter directed Lecca in setting up the Central Jewish Office, which he assumed would function as a Judenrat to streamline extermination policies. According to such plans, only some 17,000 Jews, labeled useful to Romania's economy, were to be exempt. The transports had already been announced to the Romanian Railways by autumn 1942, but the government eventually decided to postpone these measures indefinitely as was done with most other deportations to Transnistria. Antonescu's new orders on the matter were brought up in his conversations with Hitler at Schloss Klessheim, where both leaders show themselves aware of the fate awaiting Jewish deportees to Poland. By then, German authorities charged with applying the Final Solution in Eastern Europe completely abandoned their plans with respect to Romania. In August 1942, Antonescu had worked out plans with the SS for deporting all of the Jews of the Regat or the "Old Kingdom" to the German-run death camps in Poland, but then cancelled the deportation. The principal reasons for his change of mind were signs of disapproval from court circles, a warning from the American government passed on by the Swiss ambassador that he would prosecuted for war crimes and crimes against humanity after the Allies had won if the deportation went ahead, and most importantly because Hitler would not undo the Second Vienna Award and return northern Transylvania to Romania. Antonescu saw the deportation of the Jews of the Regat as the pro quid quo for the return of Transylvania and unable to obtain satisfactory promises from the German Ambassador Baron Manfred von Killinger that Romania would be rewarded with the return of Transylvania in exchange for handing over its Jews, Antonescu cancelled the deportation until the Germans would make him a better offer.

According to Oldson, by the final stage of the war Romania rejected "all extreme measures against Jews who could not be proven to be communists." The planned transports to Palestine, the prospect of which irritated Nazi German observers, implied a hope that the Allies' focus would shift away from the regime's previous guilt and, at the same time, looked forward to payments to be made in exchange for each person saved. The contrary implications of Romanian nationalism, manifested as reluctance to obey German commands and discomfort with drastic change in general, are occasionally offered as further explanations of the phenomenon. While reflecting upon the issue of emigration to Palestine, Antonescu also yielded to pleas of Jewish community leaders, and allowed safe passage through Romania for various Northern Transylvanian Jews fleeing the Holocaust in Hungary. He was doing the same for certain Northern Transylvanian Romani communities who had escaped southwards. In that context, Nazi German ideologues began objecting to Antonescu's supposed leniency. Antonescu nevertheless alternated tolerance of illegal immigration with drastic measures. In early 1944, he issued an order to shoot illegal immigrants, which was probably never enforced by the Border Police (who occasionally turned in Jewish refugees to the German authorities). The Antonescu regime allowed the extermination of the Romanian Jewish diaspora in other parts of Europe, formally opposing their deportation in some cases where it appeared Germany was impinging upon Romania's sovereignty.

== Opposition and political persecution ==
=== Political mainstream ===
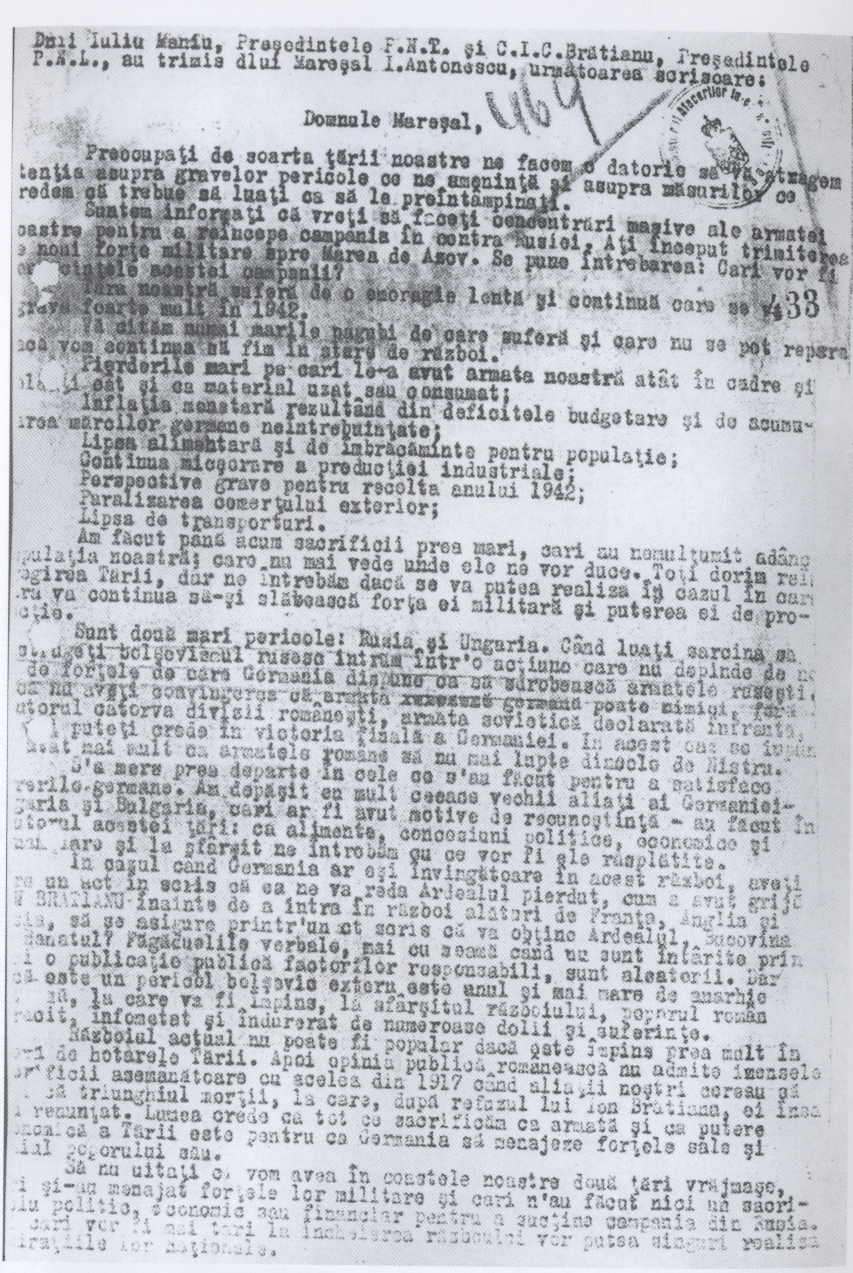
January 1942 letter of protest, signed by Iuliu Maniu and Dinu Brătianu and addressed to Antonescu

The circumstances of wartime accounted for cautious and ambivalent approaches to Antonescu's rule from among the Romanian political mainstream, which grouped advocates of liberal democracy and anti-fascism. According to Gledhill and King: "Romanian liberals had been critical of their government's warm relationship with Hitler, which had been developing throughout the 1930s, but the [1940] Soviet attack on Romanian territory left them with little chance but to support Germany's invasion of the Soviet Union." Other authors also cite the Greater Romanian agenda of the Antonescu executive as a reason behind the widespread acquiescence. The tendency was illustrated by Dinu Brătianu, who, in late January 1941, told his National Liberal colleagues that the new "government of generals" was "the best solution possible to the current crisis", urging the group to provide Antonescu with "all the support we can give him." An early point of contention between Antonescu and the National Peasants' Party came in spring 1941, when Antonescu's support for the Balkans Campaign and Romania's claim to parts of Vojvodina were met with a letter of protest from Iuliu Maniu, which Antonescu dismissed. Maniu and Brătianu also issued several condemnations of Antonescu's decision to continue the war beyond the Dniester. One such letter, signed by both, claimed that, while earlier steps had been "legitimised by the entire soul of the nation, the Romanian people will never consent to the continuation of the struggle beyond our national borders." Maniu specifically mentioned the possibility of Allied victory, accused Antonescu of diverting attention from the goal of Greater Romania (Northern Transylvania included), and stressed that Romania's ongoing participation in the Axis was "troubling enough".

Antonescu is known to have publicly admonished opposition leaders for their disobedience, which he equated with obstruction, and to have monitored their activities through the Special Intelligence Service. However, some early communiqués he addressed to Brătianu also feature offers of resignation, which their recipient reluctantly rejected. The Germans objected to such ambiguities, and Hitler once advised Antonescu to have Maniu killed, an option which the Conducător rejected because of the PNȚ leader's popularity with the peasants. While tolerating contacts between Maniu and the Allies, Antonescu arrested the clandestine British envoys to Romania, thus putting a stop to the 1943 Operation Autonomous. In parallel, his relationship with Queen Mother Helen and Michael rapidly deteriorated after he began advising the royal family on how to conduct its affairs. Dissent from Antonescu's policies sometimes came from inside his own camp. Both the officer corps and the General Staff were divided on the issue of war beyond the Dniester, although it is possible that the majority agreed it would bring Northern Transylvania back to Romania. A prominent case was that of Iosif Iacobici, the Chief of the Romanian General Staff, whose objection to the massive transfer of Romanian troops to the Eastern Front resulted in his demotion and replacement with Ilie Șteflea (January 1942). Șteflea issued similar calls, and Antonescu's eventually agreed to preserve a home army just before the Battle of Stalingrad. Various other military men extended their protection to persecuted Jews. Overall, Antonescu met significant challenges in exercising control over the politicised sectors in the armed forces.

Antonescu's racial discrimination laws and Romania's participation in the Holocaust earned significant objections from various individuals and groups in Romanian society. One noted opponent was Queen Mother Helen, who actively intervened to save Jews from being deported. The Mayor of Cernăuți, Traian Popovici, publicly objected to the deportation of Jews, as did Gherman Pântea, his counterpart in Odessa. The appeals of Queen Helen, King Michael, the Orthodox Metropolitan of Transylvania Nicolae Bălan, Apostolic Nuncio Andrea Cassulo and Swiss Ambassador René de Weck are credited with having helped avert the full application of the Final Solution in Antonescu's Romania. Cassulo and Bălan together pleaded for the fate of certain Jews, including all who had converted to Christianity, and the former publicly protested against deportations. While Romania and the United States were still at peace, American Minister Plenipotentiary Franklin Mott Gunther repeatedly attempted to make his superiors aware of Romanian actions against the Jews, and Turkish diplomats unsuccessfully sought American approval for transferring Romanian Jews to safe passage through Anatolia and into Palestine. Dinu Brătianu also condemned antisemitic measures, prompting Antonescu to accuse him of being an ally of "the Yid in London". Together with Maniu and Ion Mihalache, Brătianu signed statements condemning the isolation, persecution and expulsion of Jews, which prompted Antonescu to threaten to clamp down on them. However, both parties were occasionally ambiguous on racial issues, and themselves produced antisemitic messages. Brătianu is also known for publicly defending the cause of Romani people, opposing their deportation on grounds that it would "turn back the clock on several centuries of history", a stance which drew support from his civilian peers. In parallel, some regular Romanians such as nurse Viorica Agarici intervened to save Jewish lives, while, from inside the Jewish community, Chief Rabbi Alexandru Șafran and activist Mișu Benvenisti rallied with Wilhelm Filderman in public protests against Antonescu's decisions, being occasionally joined by A. L. Zissu. In 1943, Filderman himself was deported to Mohyliv-Podilskyi, but eventually allowed to return.

=== Political underground ===
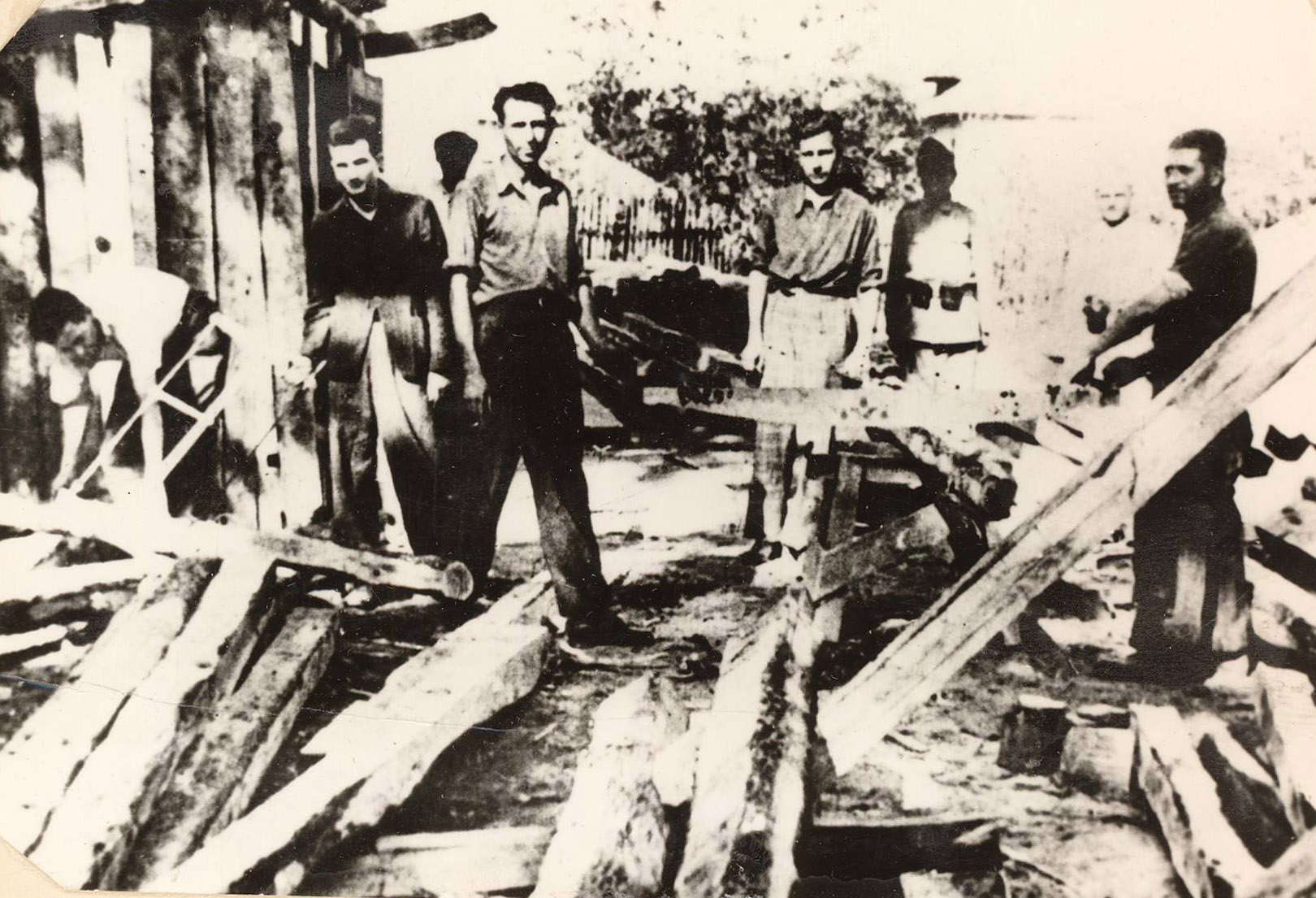
Political prisoners of the Antonescu regime, photographed in Târgu Jiu camp, 1943. Nicolae Ceaușescu, future leader of Communist Romania, is second from left

Organised resistance movements in Antonescu's Romania were comparatively small-scale and marginal. In addition to a Zionist underground which aided Jews to pass through or flee the country, the regime was confronted with local political movements of contrasting shades. One of them comprised far left and left-wing elements, which Antonescu's rise to power had caught in an unusual position. The minor Romanian Communist Party, outlawed since the rule of Ferdinand I for its Cominternist national policies, had been rendered virtually inactive by the German-Soviet non-aggression pact. Once reanimated by Operation Barbarossa, the PCR was unable to create an actual armed resistance movement, although it was able to coordinate the policies of several other small leftist groups. Speaking shortly before the invasion of the Soviet Union, and adopting the "Jewish Bolshevism" position, Antonescu ordered authorities to compile lists comprising "the names of all Jewish and communist agents", who were to be kept under close surveillance. Among people arrested on suspicion of communism, Jews were sent to Transnistrian sites such as Vapniarka and Rîbnița, while others were interned in regular facilities such as those in Caransebeș and Târgu Jiu. In all, some 2,000 Jewish Romanian deportees to the region had been accused of political crimes (the category also included those who had tried to escape forced labour). According to one estimate, people held on charges of being communists accounted for just under 2,000 people, of whom some 1,200 were jailed in Romania proper. Capital punishment was used against various partisan-like activists, while the vast majority of communist prisoners in Rîbnița were massacred in March 1944. At the other end of the political spectrum, after the Legionary Rebellion and the Iron Guard's decapitation, many Legionaries who opposed the regime, and whom Antonescu himself believed were "communists in [Legionary] green shirts", were killed or imprisoned. An Iron Guardist underground was nevertheless formed locally, and probably numbered in thousands. Some of Antonescu's political prisoners from both camps were given a chance to redeem themselves by joining units on the Eastern Front.

Although repressed, divided and weak, the PCR capitalised on the Soviet victories, being integrated into the mainstream opposition. At the same time, a "prison faction" emerged around Gheorghe Gheorghiu-Dej, opposing both the formal leadership and the so-called "Muscovite" communists who had taken refuge in the Soviet Union before the war. While maneuvering for control within the PCR during and after 1944, "prison" communists destroyed a third group, formed around the PCR's nominal leader Ștefan Foriș (whom they kidnapped and eventually killed). The PCR leadership was still suffering from a crisis of legitimacy after beginning talks with the larger parties. The Soviets and "Muscovite" communists campaigned among Romanian prisoners of war in order to have them switch sides in the war, and eventually managed to set up the Tudor Vladimirescu Division.

=== Cultural circles ===
Measures enforced by the Antonescu regime had contradictory effects on the Romanian cultural scene. According to Romanian literary historians Letiția Guran and Alexandru Ștefan, "the Antonescu regime [...] did not affect negatively cultural modernity. The Romanian cultural elite regarded Antonescu's policies for the most part with sympathy." Nevertheless, other researchers record the dissent of several cultural environments: the classic liberalism and cosmopolitanism of aging literary theorist Eugen Lovinescu, the "Lovinescian" Sibiu Literary Circle, and the rebellious counterculture of young avant-garde writers (Ion Caraion, Geo Dumitrescu, Dimitrie Stelaru, Constant Tonegaru). Prominent left-wing writers Tudor Arghezi, Victor Eftimiu and Zaharia Stancu were political prisoners during the Antonescu years. Author George Călinescu also stood out against the official guidelines, and, in 1941, took a risk by publishing a synthesis of Romanian literature which emphasised Jewish contributions, while composer George Enescu pleaded with Antonescu personally for the fate of Romani musicians. Similar acts of solidarity were performed by various prominent intellectuals and artists. In August 1942, King Michael received a manifesto endorsed by intellectuals from various fields, deploring the murders in Transnistria, and calling for a realignment of policies. Another such document of April 1944 called for an immediate peace with the Soviet Union. On a more intimate level, a diary kept by philosopher and art critic Alice Voinescu expresses her indignation over the antisemitic measures and massacres.

A special aspect of political repression and cultural hegemony was Antonescu's persecution of Evangelical or Restorationist Christian denominations, first outlawed under the National Legionary regime. Several thousand adherents of the Pentecostal Union and the Baptist Union were reportedly jailed in compliance with his orders. Persecution targeted groups of religiously motivated conscientious objectors. In addition to the Inochentist movement, these groups included the Pentecostal Union, the Seventh-day Adventist Conference and the Jehovah's Witnesses Association. Antonescu himself recounted having contemplated using the death penalty against "sects" who would not allow military service, and ultimately deciding in favour of deporting "recalcitrant" ones. On 9 September 1940, the Ministry of Culture and Art issued a list of confessions that were recognised and protected by the regime. The list included the Romanian Orthodox Church, the Greek Catholic Church, the Roman Catholic Church, the Armenian Orthodox Church, the Ukrainian Orthodox Church, the Calvinist Church, the Lutheran Church, the Unitarian Church, and Islam. Any confession not listed was considered officially banned.

== References and further reading ==
- Final Report of the International Commission on the Holocaust in Romania, Polirom, Iași, 2004. ISBN 973-681-989-2
- Viorel Achim, The Roma in Romanian History, Central European University Press, Budapest, 2004. ISBN 963-9241-84-9
- Jean Ancel,
  - Preludiu la asasinat. Pogromul de la Iași, 29 iunie 1941, Polirom, Iași, 2005. ISBN 973-681-799-7
  - " 'The New Jewish Invasion' – The Return of the Survivors in Transnistria", in David Bankier (ed.), The Jews are Coming Back: The Return of the Jews to Their Countries of Origin after WWII, Berghahn Books, Providence, 2005, pp. 231–256. ISBN 1-57181-527-9
- Lucian Boia, Istorie și mit în conștiința românească, Humanitas, Bucharest, 1997. ISBN 973-50-0055-5
- Christopher R. Browning, The Origins of the Final Solution: The Evolution of Nazi Jewish Policy, September 1939 – March 1942, University of Nebraska Press, Lincoln, 2004. ISBN 978-0-8032-5979-9
- Maria Bucur,
  - "Edifices of the Past: War Memorials and Heroes in Twentieth-century Romania", in Maria Todorova (ed.), Balkan Identities: Nation and Memory, C. Hurst & Co. Publishers, London, 2004, pp. 158–179. ISBN 1-85065-715-7
  - "Women's Stories as Sites of Memory: Gender and Remembering Romania's World Wars", in Nancy M. Wingfield, Maria Bucur (eds.), Gender & War in Twentieth-century Eastern Europe, Indiana University Press, Bloomington, 2006, pp. 171–192
- Christopher Chant, The Encyclopedia of Codenames of World War II, Routledge & Kegan Paul Books Ltd., London, 1987. ISBN 0-7102-0718-2
- Adrian Cioroianu, Pe umerii lui Marx. O introducere în istoria comunismului românesc, Editura Curtea Veche, Bucharest, 2005. ISBN 973-669-175-6
- Marcel Cornis-Pope, John Neubauer (eds.), History of the Literary Cultures of East-Central Europe, John Benjamins, Amsterdam & Philadelphia, 2004. ISBN 90-272-3452-3; see:
  - Letiția Guran, Alexandru Ștefan, "Romanian Literature under Stalinism", pp. 112–124
  - John Neubauer et al., "1945", pp. 143–177
- Dennis Deletant, Hitler's Forgotten Ally: Ion Antonescu and His Regime, Romania, 1940–1944, Palgrave Macmillan, London, 2006. ISBN 1-4039-9341-6
- Dennis Deletant, "Romania" in The Oxford Companion to World War II edited by I. C. B. Dear and M. R. D. Foot (2001) pp 954–959.
- Stanislaw Frankowski, "Post-Communist Europe", in Peter Hodgkinson, Andrew Rutherford (eds.), Capital Punishment: Global Issues and Prospects, Waterside Press, Winchester, 1996, pp. 215–242. ISBN 1-872870-32-5
- Aleksander Gella, Development of Class Structure in Eastern Europe: Poland and Her Southern Neighbors, State University of New York Press, Albany, 1989. ISBN 0-88706-833-2
- Juliana Geran Pilon, The Bloody Flag. Post-Communist Nationalism in Eastern Europe. Spotlight on Romania (Studies in Social Philosophy & Policy No. 16), Transaction Publishers, New Brunswick & London, 1992. ISBN 1-56000-620-X
- Dinu C. Giurescu, Romania in the Second World War: 1939–1945 (East European Monographs, 2000).
- Roger Griffin, The Nature of Fascism, Routledge, London, 1993. ISBN 0-415-09661-8
- Arnold D. Harvey, Collision of Empires: Britain in Three World Wars, 1793–1945, Continuum International Publishing Group, London, 1992. ISBN 1-85285-078-7
- Rebecca Ann Haynes, " 'A New Greater Romania'? Romanian Claims to the Serbian Banat in 1941", in Central Europe, Vol. 3, No. 2, November 2005, pp. 99–120; republished by University College London's Library Services
- Radu Ioanid, "Romania", in David S. Wyman, Charles H. Rosenzveig (eds.), The World Reacts to the Holocaust, Johns Hopkins University Press, Baltimore & London, 1996, pp. 225–252. ISBN 0-8018-4969-1
- Michelle Kelso, "Gypsy Deportations from Romania to Transnistria, 1942–44", in Karola Fings, Donald Kenrick (eds.), In the Shadow of the Swastika: Volume 2: The Gypsies during the Second World War, University of Hertfordshire Press, Hatfield, 1999, pp. 95–130. ISBN 0-900458-85-2
- Padraic Kenney, The Burdens of Freedom: Eastern Europe since 1989, Zed Books, London, 2006. ISBN 1-84277-663-0
- Peter C. Kent, The Lonely Cold War of Pope Pius XII: The Roman Catholic Church and the Division of Europe, 1943–1950, McGill-Queen's University Press, Montreal & Kingston, 2002. ISBN 0-7735-2326-X
- Charles King, The Moldovans: Romania, Russia, and the Politics of Culture, Hoover Press, Stanford, 2000. ISBN 0-8179-9792-X
- Walter Laqueur, Fascism: Past, Present, Future, Oxford University Press, Oxford etc., 1997. ISBN 0-19-511793-X
- Philip Morgan, Fascism in Europe, 1919–1945, Routledge, London, 2003. ISBN 0-415-16943-7
- David Nicholls, Adolf Hitler: A Biographical Companion, ABC-CLIO, Santa Barbara, 2000. ISBN 0-87436-965-7
- William O. Oldson, A Providential Anti-Semitism. Nationalism and Polity in Nineteenth-Century Romania, American Philosophical Society, Philadelphia, 1991. ISBN 0-87169-193-0
- Z. Ornea, Anii treizeci. Extrema dreaptă românească, Editura Fundației Culturale Române, Bucharest, 1995. ISBN 973-9155-43-X
- Monty Noam Penkower, The Jews Were Expendable: Free World Diplomacy and the Holocaust, Wayne State University Press, Detroit, 1988. ISBN 0-8143-1952-1
- Antony Polonsky, Joanna B. Michlic, introduction to The Neighbors Respond: The Controversy over the Jedwabne Massacre in Poland, Princeton University Press, Princeton, 2004, pp. 1–43. ISBN 0-691-11306-8
- Sabrina P. Ramet, "The Way We Were—And Should Be Again? European Orthodox Churches and the 'Idyllic Past' ", in Timothy A. Byrnes, Peter J. Katzenstein (eds.), Religion in an Expanding Europe, Cambridge University Press, Cambridge, 2006. ISBN 0-521-85926-3
- Steven D. Roper, Romania: The Unfinished Revolution, Routledge, London, 2000. ISBN 90-5823-027-9
- Michael Shafir, "The Mind of Romania's Radical Right", in Sabrina P. Ramet (ed.), The Radical Right in Central and Eastern Europe since 1989, Penn State University Press, University Park, 1999, pp. 213–232. ISBN 0-271-01811-9
- Thomas, Martin. "To arm an ally: French arms sales to Romania, 1926–1940." Journal of Strategic Studies 19.2 (1996): 231–259.
- Ottmar Trașcă, "Ocuparea orașului Odessa de căre armata română și măsurile adoptate față de populația evreiască" Archived 15 September 2018 at the Wayback Machine, in the Romanian Academy George Bariț Institute of History's Historica Yearbook 2008, pp. 377–425
- Francisco Veiga, Istoria Gărzii de Fier, 1919–1941: Mistica ultranaționalismului, Humanitas, Bucharest, 1993. ISBN 973-28-0392-4
- Watts, Larry L. Romanian Cassandra: Ion Antonescu and the Struggle for Reform, 1916–1941 (East European Monographs, 1993)
- Petru Weber, "Die Wahrnehmung des »Domestic Holocaust« im Rumänien der Nachkriegsjahre", in Regina Fritz, Carola Sachse, Edgar Wolfrum (eds.), Nationen und ihre Selbstbilder. Postdiktatorische Gesellschaften in Europa, Wallstein Verlag, Göttingen, 2008, pp. 150–167. ISBN 978-3-8353-0212-9
- Gerhard L. Weinberg, Germany, Hitler, and World War II: Essays in Modern German and World History, Cambridge University Press, Cambridge, 1996. ISBN 0-521-56626-6

=== Historiography and memory ===
- Chioveanu, Mihai. "A Deadlock Of Memory The Myth And Cult Of Ion Antonescu In Post-Communist Romania." Studia Hebraica 3 (2003): 102–123.
- Treptow, Kurt W. Romania and World War II ( Center for Romanian Studies, 1996).
- White, George W. Nationalism and Territory. Constructing Group Identity in Southeastern Europe, Rowman & Littlefield, Lanham, 2000. ISBN 0-8476-9809-2
