= Słobódka =

Słobódka may refer to the following places:

- Słobódka, Hajnówka County in Podlaskie Voivodeship (north-east Poland)
- Słobódka, Sokółka County in Podlaskie Voivodeship (north-east Poland)
- Słobódka, Suwałki County in Podlaskie Voivodeship (north-east Poland)

== See also ==
- Slabodka (disambiguation)
- Slobidka
- Sloboda (disambiguation)
- Slobodskoy (disambiguation)
- Slobodka (disambiguation)
