= Slobodskoy (inhabited locality) =

Slobodskoy (Russian: Слободской; masculine), Slobodskaya (Слободская; feminine), or Slobodskoye (Слободское; neuter) is the name of several inhabited localities in Russia.

Urban localities

- Slobodskoy, Kirov Oblast, a town in Kirov Oblast

Rural localities

- Slobodskoy, Arkhangelsk Oblast, a settlement in Kharitonovsky Selsoviet of Kotlassky District of Arkhangelsk Oblast
- Slobodskoy, Bryansk Oblast, a settlement in Trosnyansky Selsoviet of Zhukovsky District of Bryansk Oblast
- Slobodskoy, Oryol Oblast, a khutor in Koroskovsky Selsoviet of Kromskoy District of Oryol Oblast
- Slobodskoy, Rostov Oblast, a khutor in Susatskoye Rural Settlement of Semikarakorsky District of Rostov Oblast
- Slobodskoye, Kostroma Oblast, a village in Kuzeminskoye Settlement of Soligalichsky District of Kostroma Oblast
- Slobodskoye, Bor, Nizhny Novgorod Oblast, a village in Lindovsky Selsoviet of the city of oblast significance of Bor, Nizhny Novgorod Oblast
- Slobodskoye, Kstovsky District, Nizhny Novgorod Oblast, a selo in Slobodskoy Selsoviet of Kstovsky District of Nizhny Novgorod Oblast
- Slobodskoye, Tula Oblast, a selo in Shilovsky Rural Okrug of Yefremovsky District of Tula Oblast
- Slobodskaya, a village in Shabanovsky Rural Okrug of Omutinsky District of Tyumen Oblast
