= Slobodskoy =

Slobodskoy (masculine), Slobodskaya (feminine), or Slobodskoye (neuter) may refer to:

- Slobodskoy District, a district of Kirov Oblast, Russia
- Slobodskoy (inhabited locality) (Slobodskaya, Slobodskoye), name of several inhabited localities in Russia
