= Slabodka yeshiva =

Slabodka yeshiva may refer to:

- Hebron Yeshiva, a branch of the Slabodka Yeshiva in Hebron, relocated afterward to Jerusalem
- Slabodka yeshiva (Bnei Brak), a branch of the Slabodka yeshiva in Bnei Brak
- Yeshivas Knesses Yisrael (Slabodka), the original Slabodka yeshiva, located in Slabodka (Vilijampolė), Lithuania
