= Slobidka =

Slobidka is the name of a number of Ukrainian locations, which is the term denoting a type of settlement, see Sloboda. It may refer to:

- Slobidka, Chortkiv Raion, Ternopil Oblast
- Slobidka, Kozliv settlement hromada, Ternopil Raion, Ternopil Oblast
- Slobidka, Odesa
- Slobidka, Podilsk Raion, Odesa Oblast
- Slobidka, Terebovlia urban hromada, Ternopil Raion, Ternopil Oblast

== See also ==
- Slobodka
- Slobodka (disambiguation)
- Słobódka (disambiguation)
