= Dovhe =

Dovhe is the Ukrainian name of several places.

- Dovhe, Slovianoserbsk Raion, in eastern Ukraine
- Dovhe, Stryi Raion, in western Ukraine
- Dovhe, Zakarpattia Oblast (historical Northern Maramureș) in western Ukraine
- Długie, Sanok County, in south eastern Poland, called Dovhe in Ukrainian
- Mostyshche, a village in western Ukraine formerly called Dovhe

== See also ==
- Dolge (disambiguation), the Russian form of this name
