= Special Operations Center "East" (Ukraine) =

Ukrainian special forces unit

Special Operations Center "East" "Prince Svyatoslav Khorobroy" (2022–present) 3rd Special Forces Regiment (2000–2022)
- Окремий центр спеціальних операцій «Схід» імені князя Святослава Хороброго
- Active: 1992–present
- Country: Ukraine
- Type: SOF; Since 6 January 2016
- Garrison/HQ: Kropyvnytskyi
- Motto: "Don't Die Twice"
- Engagements: War in Donbas; First Battle of Donetsk Airport; Battle of Artemivsk; Second Battle of Donetsk Airport; Battle in Shakhtarsk Raion; Battle of Ilovaisk; Battle of Debaltseve; Battle of Avdiivka
- Decorations: For Courage and Bravery
- Website: https://3polk.info

Commanders
- Current commander: Brigadier General Mykhailo Krasotin

Insignia
- Former sleeve patch

Special Operations Center "East" "Prince Svyatoslav Khorobroy" (OC SpO) (Ukrainian: Окремий центр спеціальних операцій «Схід» імені князя Святослава Хороброго) is a formation of special forces as part of the Special Operations Forces of the Armed Forces of Ukraine. It was subordinate to the 4th Special Intelligence Service of the Main Intelligence Directorate of the Ministry of Defense of Ukraine. The unit is quartered in Kropyvnytskyi. It is part of the United Rapid Response Forces.

The regiment was formed on the basis of the 10th Separate Brigade of Special Purpose of the Main Reconnaissance Directorate (GRU) of the Soviet Armed Forces. The regiment participated in the war in Donbas.

Since 2018, the regiment has been named after Prince Svyatoslav the Brave, the ruler of Kievan Rus' of the 10th century.

== History ==
With the Independence of Ukraine, on 11 October 1991, the 10th Special Brigade of the USSR was resubordinated to the Minister of Defense of Ukraine, and the personnel of the military unit took an oath of loyalty to the Ukrainian people.

Until the fall of 1997, the brigade was under the operational command of the 32nd Army Corps. Structure at the time included:

- 2 Reconnaissance battalions
- 2 Training companies (reconnaissance and communication)
- Logistics company
- Special weapons company
- Automobile company
- Special radio communication unit
- Canine department

By the directive of the Minister of Defense of Ukraine dated 3 June 1998, the 10th OBr SpP was reformed into the 1st Separate Special Purpose Regiment (1 OP SpP 32 AK). According to the results of 1999-2000, the 1st OP SpP was recognized by the commander of the forces of the Southern OK of the Ground Forces of the Armed Forces of Ukraine as one of the best parts of the Southern Operational Command.

On 7 September 2000, the 1st Separate Special Purpose Regiment was renamed the 3rd Separate Special Purpose Regiment and in July 2003 was relocated from the city of Staryi Krym to the city of Kropyvnytskyi (then Kirovohrad).

Representatives of the regiment represented the Armed Forces of Ukraine for two years in a row at international competitions of intelligence groups held in Slovakia, where they won prizes among teams from more than ten participating countries.

=== War in Donbas ===
In June 2014, the soldiers of the regiment defended the storage bases of armored weapons in Artemivsk.

29 July 2014 became one of the most tragic days for the regiment, when the largest number of special forces died at the same time. Led by captains Taras Karpa and Kyril Andriyenko, reconnaissance groups, a total of 19 fighters, while carrying out a pilot evacuation operation for the downed Ukrainian Su-25 aircraft, got ambushed near the village of Latysheve in Donetsk region. 10 fighters of the regiment died in the battle, along with the group commander Lt. Col. Sergiy Lyschenko.

Special forces of the regiment participated in the Fights on the Ukrainian–Russian border. A group under the command of Yuriy Kovalenko on two Armoured personnel carrier Armoured personnel carriers provided intelligence to the Ukrainian military after commanding a crossing of the Mius River near Kozhevna. Near Dibrovka, the group discovered an enemy ambush, and a battle ensued.

One special forces officer was killed, eight were wounded, two Mi-24s had to be called to help, which dealt a devastating blow to the militants.

Structure in 2017:

- 1st Special purpose squad
- 2nd Special purpose squad
- 3rd Special purpose squad
- Security squad
- Communications unit

In 2018, the regiment was awarded the honorary title "in the name of Prince Svyatoslav the Brave".

On 29 December 2019, four Ukrainian special forces were released from Russian captivity as a result of the prisoner exchange. Maj. Serhii Ivanchuk and Sgt. Ivan Deev from the 8th Spetsnaz Regiment had been in captivity since 2017; Sgt. Serhii Glondar and Jr.Sgt. Oleksandr Korinkov from the 3rd since 2015. During the same exchange, Ukraine handed over farmer Volodymyr Butrymenko, who was guilty of organizing an ambush against Ukrainian special forces on 29 July 2014.

On 6 December 2021, to the 30th anniversary of the creation of the Armed Forces of Ukraine, 13 light armored HMMWV vehicles provided by the United States as part of logistical assistance were transferred to the 3rd Special Purpose Regiment.

=== Russo-Ukrainian War ===
==== Rename as Special Operations Center ====
===== 2022 =====
The 3rd special purpose regiment named after Prince Sviatoslav the Brave was by 2022 reflagged as the Eastern Special Operations Centre "Prince Sviatoslav the Brave".

By decree of the President of Ukraine dated 29 July 2022, the center was awarded the honorary award "For Courage and Bravery."

===== 2023 =====
In July 2023, in Staromayorske, Donetsk region, the enemy headquarters was discovered by the 3rd regiment and a battle took place in which the Russian paratroopers from the 247th Guards Air Assault Regiment were forced to surrender. During the clearing of the settlement, the headquarters documentation of one of the battalions was obtained.

The 3rd special purpose regiment took part in the Battle of Avdiivka from the beginning to the end of the defensive operation. They were assigned a number of tasks: reconnaissance and surveillance, providing fire support to infantry, operating FPV drones, adjusting artillery and aviation, assault action, sniper operation and mining.

===== 2024 =====
In the Lyman direction in November 2023, the snipers of the regiment eliminated 10 enemy soldiers in a day. Within a week in April 2024, in the Donetsk direction the operators of FPV-drone unit of the tactical group "Medoid" destroyed a Russian T-72 tank, anti-aircraft missile cannon complex 2C6 "Tunguska", an armored vehicle along with 11 enemy troops.

On 12 June 2024, for the first time during the war the 3rd Special Operations Forces Regiment destroyed the newest Russian R-416GM digital radio relay communication station, a truck-based system designed to improve the efficiency of radio relay units in the field.

== Structure ==
As of 2024, the regiments's structure is as follows:

- Special Operations Center "East"
  - management & headquarters
  - 1st Special Purpose Tactical Group
  - 2nd Special Purpose Tactical Group
  - 3rd Special Purpose Tactical Group
  - "Honey Badgers” Tactical Group ("Медоїд"). Commander "Mykhailo". Created on February 24, 2022. The group began its combat journey in the vicinity of Kyiv - Irpin, Bucha, Gostomel, Mostyshche and other settlements.
    - FPV Unit "Медоїд"
  - "Batyars" Tactical Group ("Батяри")
    - FPV Unit "Батяри"
  - Fire Support Group
  - Sniper Platoon
  - Scout Platoon
  - Intelligence Company BpAK
  - Security Squad
  - Communications Unit
  - Medical Company

== Commanders ==
- (1992–1996) Colonel Ivan Yakubets
- (1996–1997) Colonel Serhiy Dokuchaev
- (2015) Colonel Vitaliy Pikulin
- (23.03.2016–03.11.2020) Colonel Oleksandr Trepak
- (from 03.11.2020) Colonel Mykhailo Krasotin

== Losses ==
As of 22 July 2025, the unit had lost 96 servicemen.

== Traditions ==
By Decree of the President of Ukraine dated 22 August 2018 No. 232/2018, the regiment was given the honorary name "in the name of Prince Svyatoslav the Brave."

On 6 December 2019, during the celebrations on the occasion of the Day of the Armed Forces of Ukraine, the regimental battle song: "Song of the Brave" was presented to soldiers and guests at the regimental square. Its author is Svyatoslav Boyko, the leader of the band "Shirokyi Lan." He created the text of the work together with the servicemen of the regiment. "Song of the Brave" was played to the accompaniment of the regimental orchestra.

=== Ceremonies ===
In August 2020, a symbolic harvest took place on the territory of the regiment. The wheat planted in the spring on the symbolic field of memory was collected with the help of sickles, part of it was threshed, and part of it was tied into bundles. Participants of the event were volunteers, military personnel and relatives of the victims. The same action took place in 2021.

== Tribute ==
=== Awarded ===
The highest state awards were awarded to:

- Yury Kovalenko – Lieutenant Colonel, Hero of Ukraine (posthumously).
- Oleksandr Trepak "Redoubt" – Colonel, Hero of Ukraine.

== See also ==
- Special Operations Forces (Ukraine)
- Andriy Malakhov
