= 1941 Odessa massacre =

Romanian massacre of Jews during World War II

Coordinates: 46.466°N 30.733°E

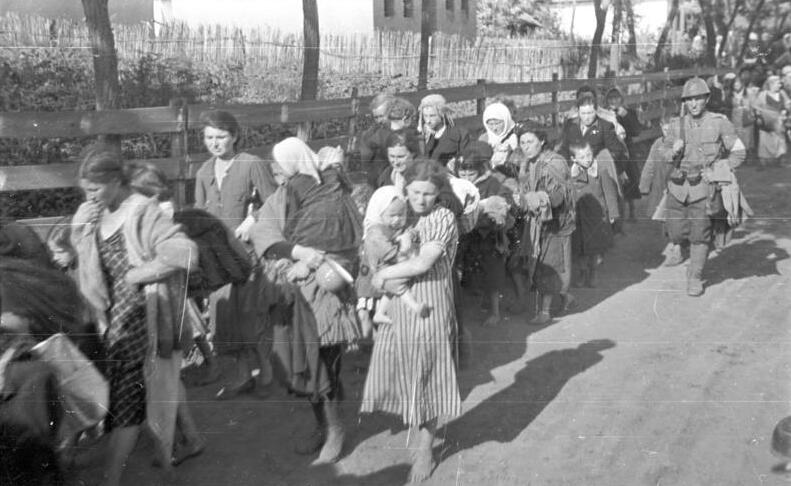
- Column of Jewish civilians deported to Transnistria escorted by Romanian soldiers
- Location: Odessa
- Date: 22–24 October 1941
- Incident type: Mass murder, genocide, ethnic cleansing
- Participants: Kingdom of Romania; Support: Nazi Germany
- Victims: 34,000–100,000

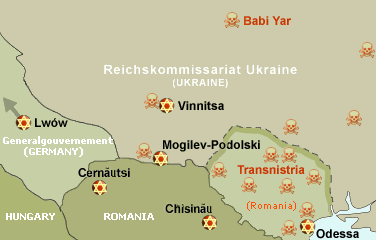
Map of the Holocaust in Ukraine. Odessa ghetto marked with gold-red star. Transnistria massacres marked with red skulls.

The Odessa massacre was the mass murder of the Jewish population of Odessa and surrounding towns in the Transnistria Governorate during the autumn of 1941 and the winter of 1942 while it was under Romanian control. It was one of the worst massacres perpetrated on Ukrainian territory.

Depending on the accepted terms of reference and scope, the Odessa massacre refers either to the events of 22–24 October 1941 in which some 25,000 to 34,000 Jews were shot or burned, or to the murder of well over 100,000 Jews in the town and the areas between the Dniester and Bug rivers, during the Romanian and German occupation which took place following the massacre. As of 2018, it was estimated that up to 30,000 people, mostly Ukrainian Jews, were murdered in the actual massacre, which occurred 22–23 October 1941. The primary perpetrators were Romanian soldiers, Einsatzgruppe SS and local ethnic Germans.

== Background ==
Before the war, Odessa had a large Jewish population of approximately 200,000, or 30% of the city's total population. By the time the Romanians had taken the city, between 80,000 and 90,000 Jews remained, the rest having fled or been evacuated by the Soviets. As the massacres occurred, Jews from surrounding villages were interned in Odessa and Romanian concentration camps set up in the surrounding areas.

On 16 October, following a two-month siege of Odessa, the Germans and Romanians captured the city.

== Mass killings of hostages and Jews on 22–24 October ==
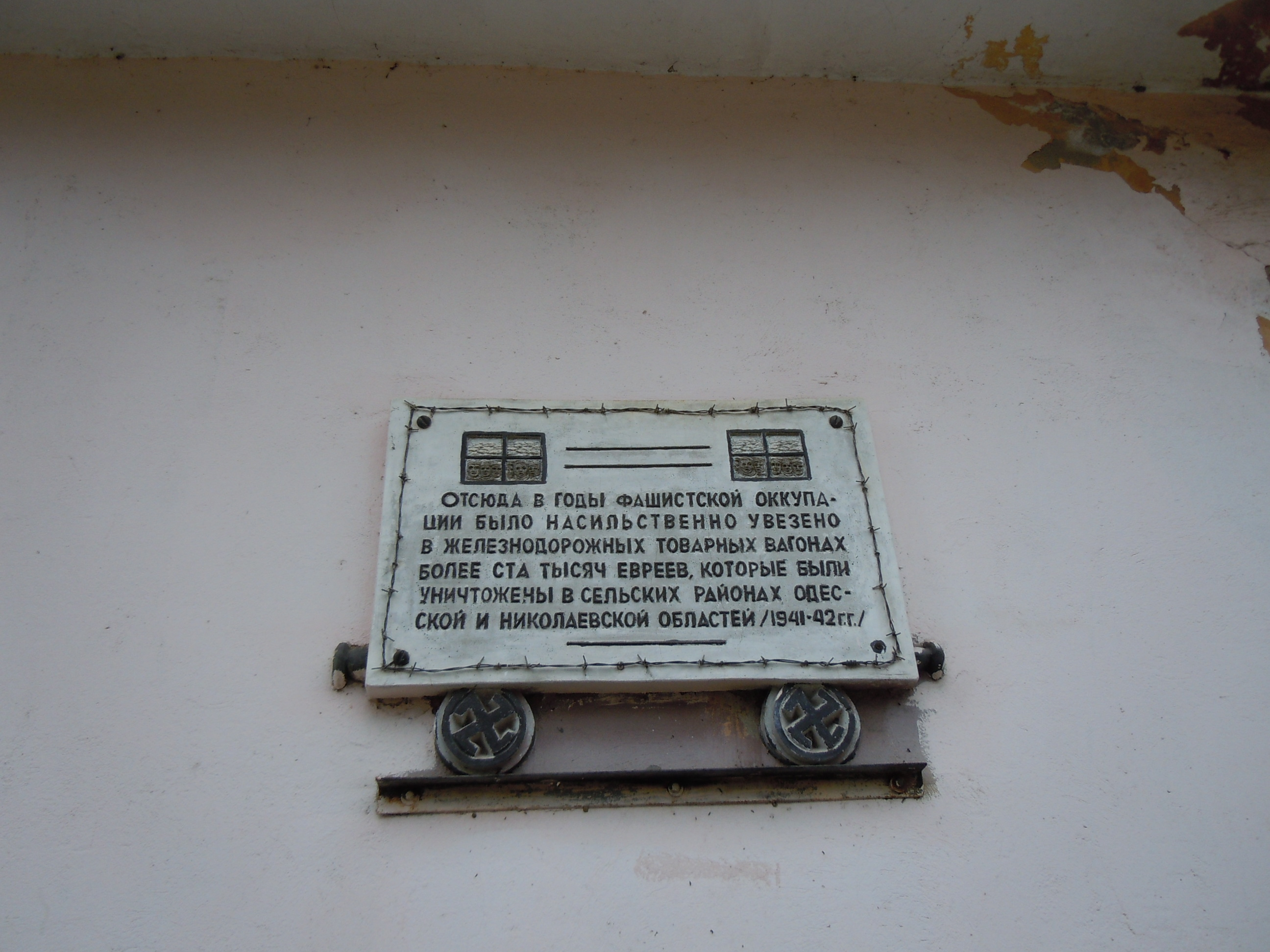
Plaque on the wall of the Odessa-Sortuvalna railway station, commemorating the Holocaust

=== Destruction of the Romanian commandant's office ===
On 22 October 1941, in the building of the NKVD on the Marazlievskaya street where the Romanian military commander's office and the headquarters of the Romanian 10th Infantry Division had settled to occupy the city, a radio-controlled mine exploded. The mine had been planted there by the sappers of the Red Army before the surrender of the city by Soviet troops. The building collapsed, and under its rubble, 67 people were killed, including 16 officers, among whom was the military commander of the city, Romanian General Ioan Glogojeanu. Responsibility for the explosion was placed on the Jews and Communists.

=== The execution of hostages ===
In response to the explosion at the commandant's office, General Nicolae Tătăranu received a direct order from Marshal Ion Antonescu, ordering "immediate reprisals" be carried out on the Jewish population. The Romanian troops and the German "Einsatzgruppe" arrived in Odessa on 23 October to kill from 5,000 to 10,000 hostages, many of whom were Jews.

Across the Marazlievskaya street, occupiers broke into the apartments of Odessa citizens and shot or hanged all residents found, without exception. They raided the streets and markets of the city and suburbs, and people who knew nothing of the bombing were shot on sight against fences or the walls of houses. Nearly 100 men were seized and shot at the Big Fountain, about two hundred people were executed in the Slobodka neighborhood near the market, 251 residents were shot in Moldavanka, Near and Far Windmills and in Aleksandrovsky Prospekt about 400 townspeople were executed. The columns of the captured hostages were driven to the area of artillery warehouses on Lustdorf Road, where they were shot or burned alive.

After the war, more than 22,000 corpses were found in mass graves.

=== The beginning of the Holocaust ===
On 23 October, an order was issued threatening all Jews with death on the spot and ordering them to report to the village of Dalnyk on 24 October. In the afternoon of 24 October, about 5,000 Jews were gathered near the outpost of Dalnyk. The first 50 people were brought to the anti-tank ditch and shot by the commander of the 10th machine-gun battalion, Lieutenant-Colonel Nicolae Deleanu.

Military Command of the mountains. Odessa brings to the attention of the population of Odessa and its surroundings that after the terrorist act committed against the Military Command on 22 October, on the day of 23 October 1941, were shot: for every German or Romanian officer and civilian official 200 Bolsheviks, and for every German or Romanian soldier 100 Bolsheviks. All the communists in Odessa will be taken hostage, which, if repeated such acts, will be shot together with their families.

— Commander of troops: Gendarmerie Lieutenant Colonel Mihail Niculescu

To speed up the process of destruction, the Jews were driven into four barracks, in which holes were made for machine guns, and the floor was pre-filled with gasoline. People in two barracks were shot with machine guns on the same day. At 17:00 the barracks were set on fire. The next day, the prisoners were shot, placed in the remaining two barracks, and in one of the barracks grenades were thrown.

Meanwhile, the Jews who were not selected for the first group, and who had already arrived in Dalnyk, were told that they were "forgiven". They were sent to various military headquarters and Gendarmerie stations for "registration", where they were detained for different lengths of time. When they were released, they discovered that their houses had been occupied and their property plundered.

During the first week of Romanian occupation of Odessa, the city lost about 10% of its inhabitants.

== Subsequent events ==
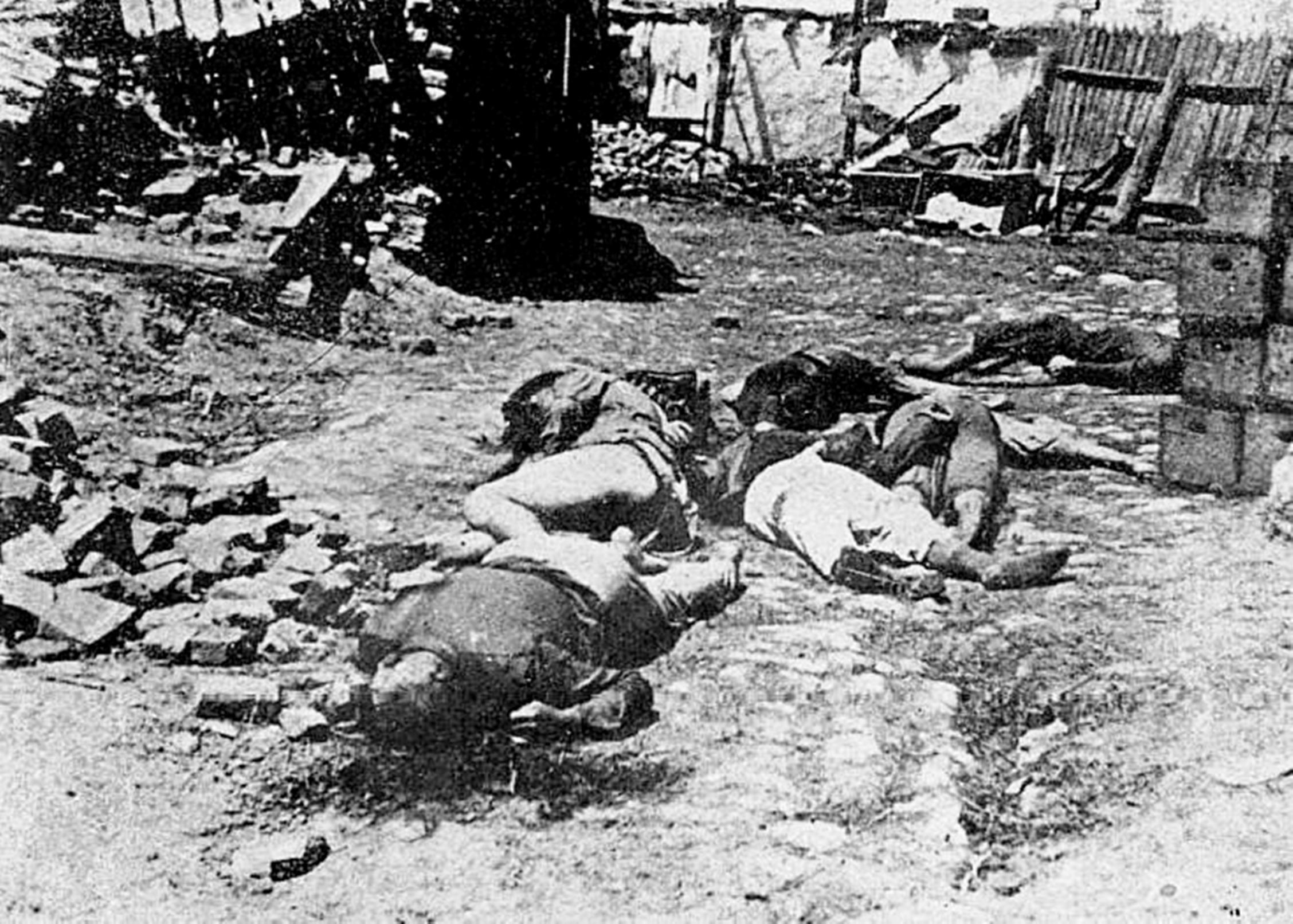
Aftermath of the Odesa Massacre: Jewish deportees killed outside Birzula (now Podilsk).

The registration carried out by the Romanian administration in late 1941 counted about 60,000 Jews in Odessa. This number included persons having only one Jewish ancestor. Jews were required to wear a special distinctive badge, a yellow hexagram (Magen David, the Star of David, a symbol of Judaism) on a black background.

On 7 November 1941, an order was issued, making it mandatory for all male Jews from 18 to 50 years old to report to the city prison.

I order:

Art. 1 All men of Jewish origin, aged 18 to 50 years, are obliged within 48 hours from the date of publication of this order to report to the city prison (Bolshefontanskaya road), having with them the essentials for existence. Their families are obliged to deliver food to them in prison. Those who did not obey this order and found after the expiration of the indicated 48-hour period will be shot on the spot.

Art. 2 All residents of the city of Odessa and its suburbs are required to notify the relevant police units of every Jew of the above category who has not complied with this order. Coverers, as well as persons who know about this and do not report, are punishable by death.

— Head of the Military Police: Hor. Odessa Lieutenant Colonel M. Niculescu

From that day on, the entire Jewish population of the city was sent to concentration camps, organized by Romanians in the countryside, primarily to the village of Bogdanovka (now in the Mykolaiv Oblast). Later, a ghetto was arranged in Odessa itself.

The Romanian administration took measures to seize the property of future victims. In mid-November, a new order was issued clarifying the authorities' demands for Jews. It said:

... All persons of Jewish origin are obliged at the registration to the Military Command or police officials to voluntarily declare all their precious objects, stones and metals. Those guilty of violating this order will be punished with the death penalty

By the middle of December, about 55,000 Jews were gathered in Bogdanovka, though some of them were not from Odessa. From 20 December 1941, until 15 January 1942, each of them was shot by a team of the Einsatzgruppe SS, Romanian soldiers, Ukrainian police and local German colonists.

A month later, a death march of 10,000 Jews was organized in three concentration camps in Golta.

In January 1942, about 35,000-40,000 of the Jews left in Odessa were evicted and sent to the ghetto that had been created on 10 January 1942, in the poor area of Slobodka. The evicted endured terrible conditions; with inadequate housing for all and severe crowding, many were forced out into the open winter air, which led to mass mortality from hypothermia.

From 12 January to 20 February 1942, the remaining 19,582 Jews were deported to Berezivka Raion of Odessa Oblast. They were transported in unheated echelons, and many died on the road. In Berezivka, groups were forced to walk to Domanevka, Bogdanovka, Golta and other concentration camps. Many died of hunger and cold along the way. The guards, consisting of Romanian and German soldiers, organized mass executions of Jews during the journeys. In 18 months, almost all the prisoners of Golta died.

== The survivors of the Holocaust ==
Some Jews were sent to work in the villages, and about half of them survived the occupation. The situation in the ghetto of Domanevka and other ghettos in Transnistria Governorate improved in 1943 after the Jews began to receive assistance from Jewish organizations in Romania. About 600 Odessa residents in these ghettos lived to be released. Several hundred Jews who were hiding in Odessa itself also survived. Jews participated in the struggle of the Odessa underground and constituted a significant part of the guerrilla units, based in the Odesa catacombs.

== Trials and punishment of the main perpetrators ==
At the Bucharest People's Tribunal, set up in 1946 by the new Romanian government in conjunction with the Allied Control Council, one of the charges brought against Marshal Ion Antonescu, the Governor of Transnistria, Gheorghe Alexianu, and the commander of the Odessa garrison, General Nicolae Macici, was "the organization of repressions against the civilian population of Odessa autumn of 1941". For these crimes, they were sentenced to death. The first two were shot on 1 July 1946. Later, King Michael commuted Macici's death sentence to life imprisonment. Macici died in prison in 1950.

In response to the appeal of the verdict filed by the son of Alexianu, on 5 November 2006, Bucharest Court of Appeal confirmed the verdict of war criminals to death, dated 17 May 1946. In response to the appeal filed by the Prosecutor General, on 6 May 2008, the case was re-examined and the judges of the High Court of Cassation and Justice finally rejected the application for revision of the 1946 sentence.

== Commemoration ==
=== Memorial in Prokhorovsky Square ===
In the early 1990s in Odessa's Prokhorovsky Square, where the "road of death" to the extermination camps for Odessa's Jews and Romani had begun on the outskirts of the city in 1941, a memorial commemorating the victims of the Holocaust was created. A memorial sign was installed, along with the "Alley of the Righteous Among the World", featuring trees planted in honor of each Odessa citizen who had harbored and saved the Jews. The complex was completed in 2004 with the erection of a monument to the victims of the Holocaust in Odessa by sculptor Zurab Tsereteli.

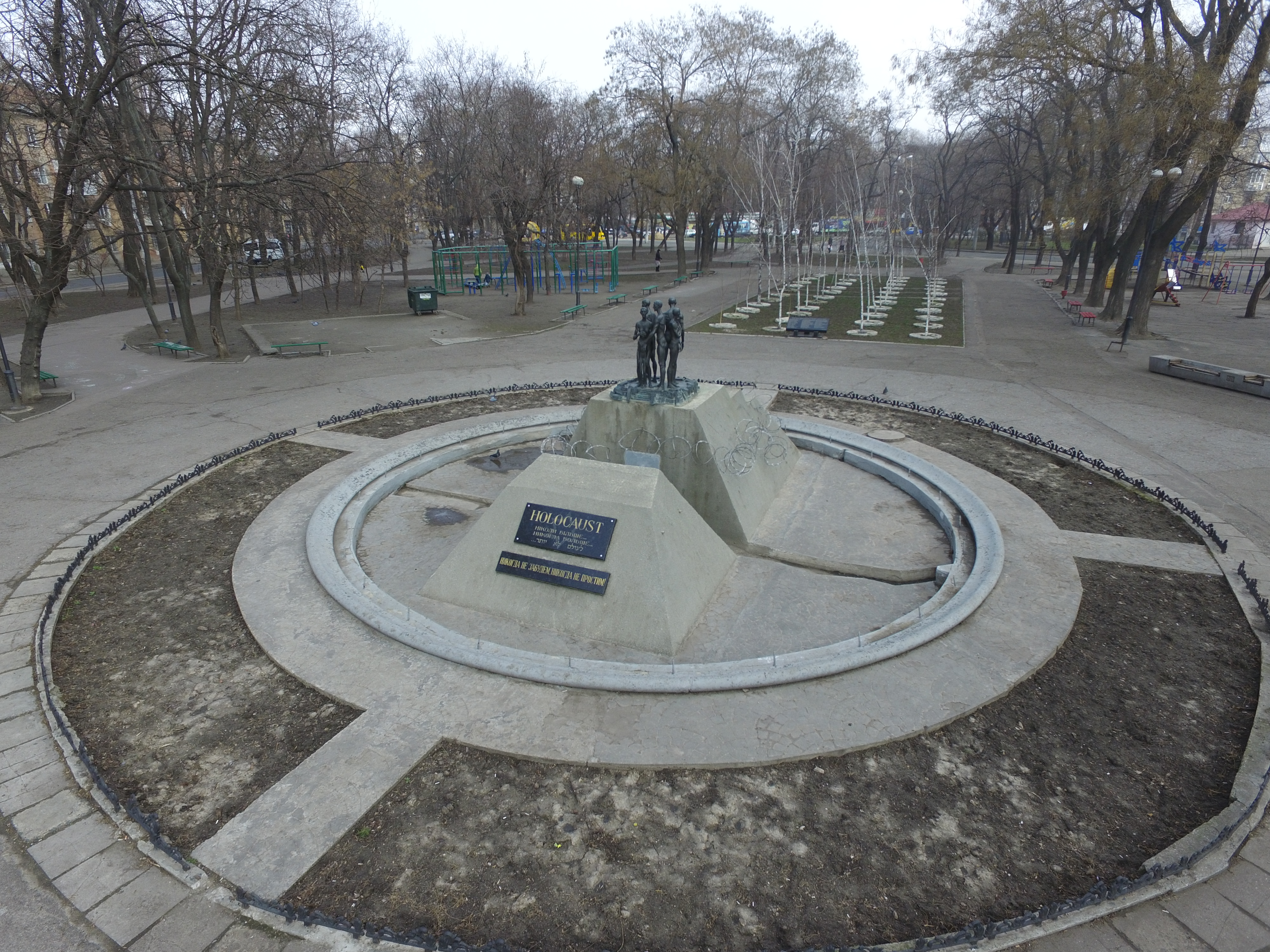
Memorial to the victims of the Holocaust

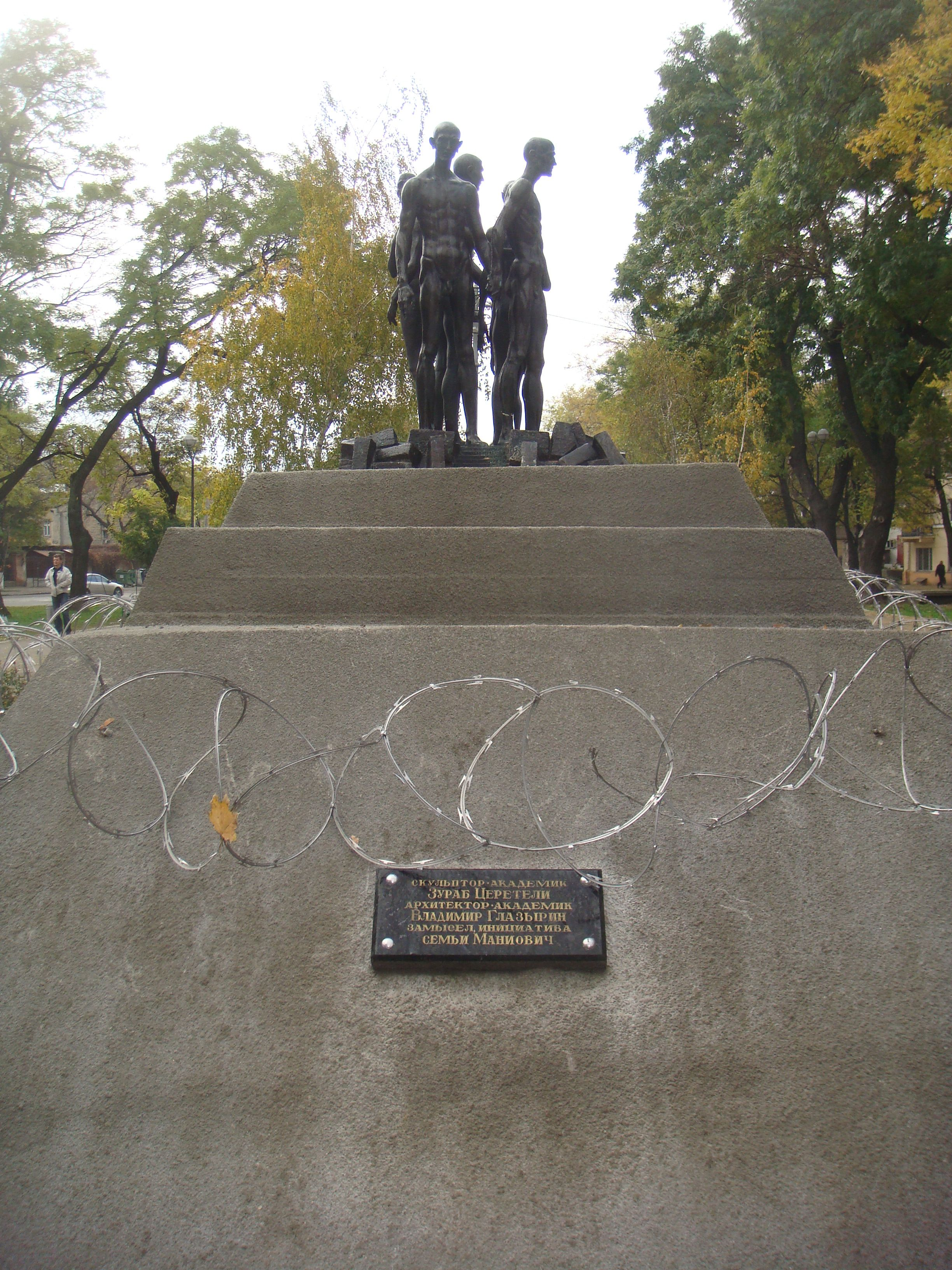
Monument by Zurab Tsereteli

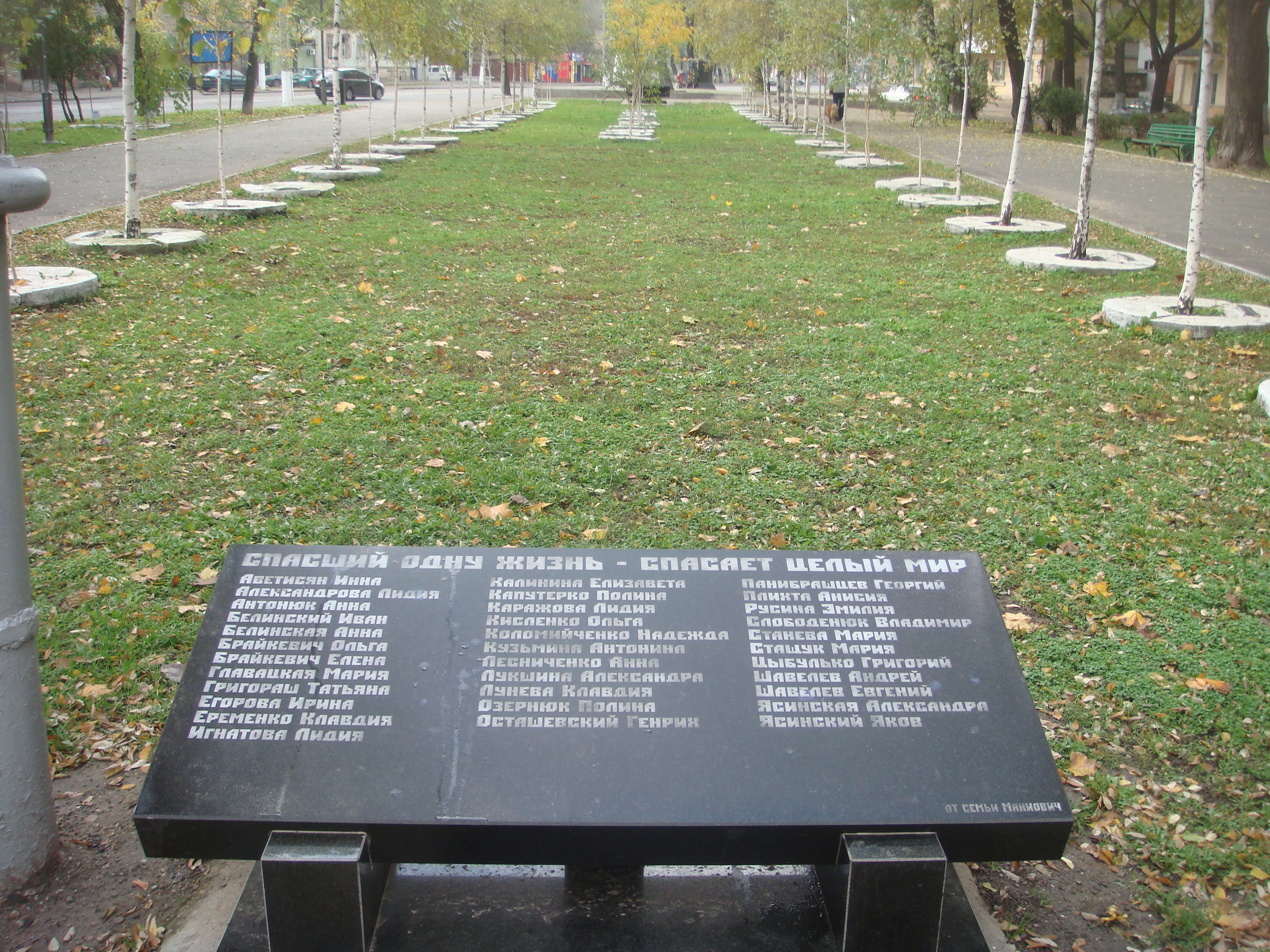
Alley of the "Righteous Among the World".

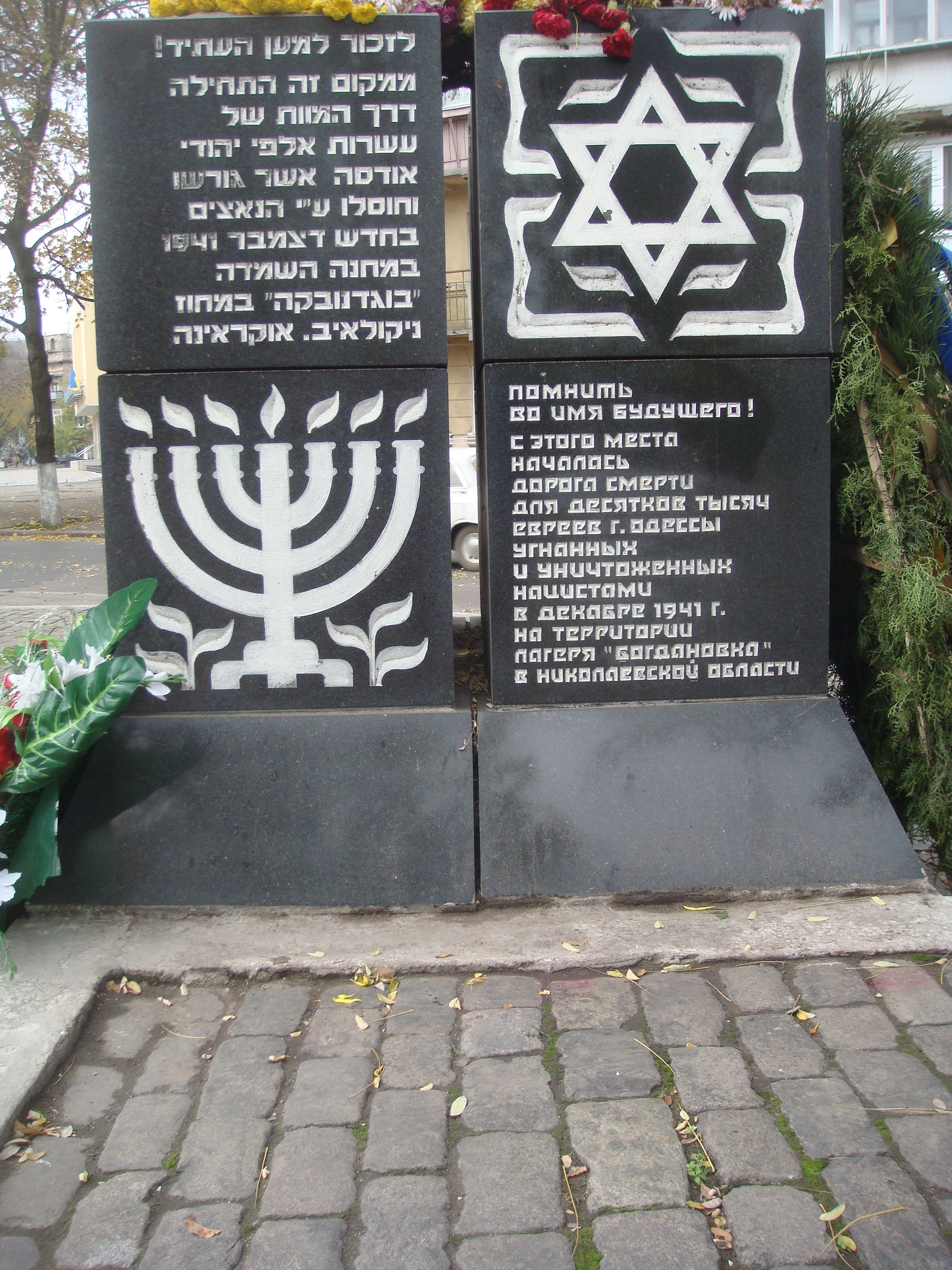
Memorial sign

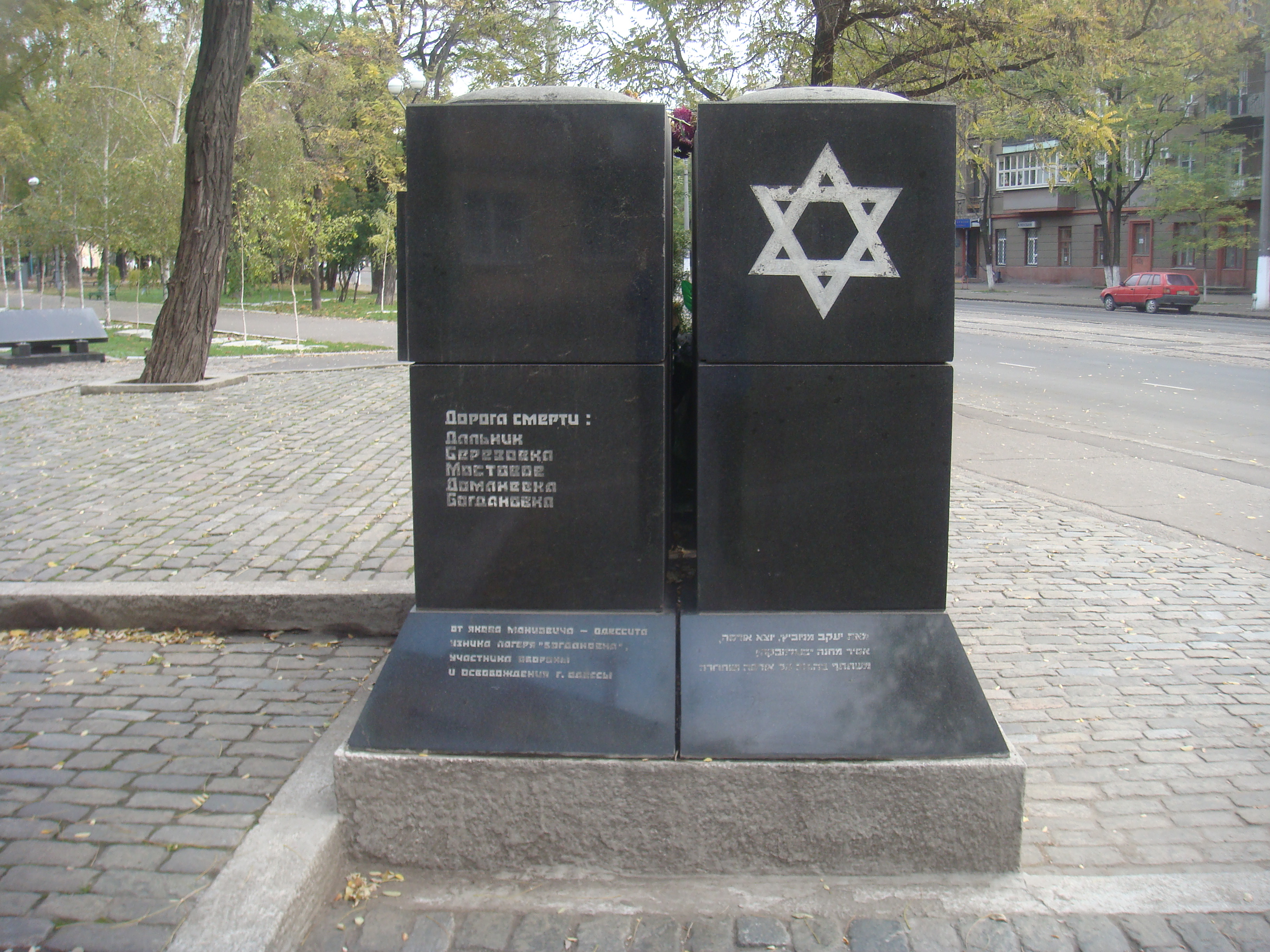
Memorial sign

=== The Holocaust Museum in Odessa ===
The Museum of the Holocaust in Odesa was created in accordance with the decision of the Council of the Odesa Regional Association of Jews, former prisoners of the ghetto and Nazi concentration camps. The chairman of the association is Roman Shvartsman. The opening of the museum took place on 22 June 2009.

=== Other ===
In January 2015, the authorities of the Italian town of Ceriano Laghetto, in the province of Monza-e-Brianza in the Lombardy region, named a city square "Martyrs Square of Odesa" in memory of the victims of the occupation regimes in Odesa: Jews killed 22–24 October 1941, as well as anti-Maidan activists, rescuers and accidental victims who died on 2 May 2014, in the Odesa Trade Union House.

On 2 May 2015, the first anniversary of the events in the House of Trade Unions, a commemorative monument dedicated to the "Martyrs of Odesa" was opened at this square. The monument is a tongue of flame with a silhouette of a dove, a symbol of the world, inside.

The 2018 tragicomic Romanian film I Do Not Care If We Go Down in History as Barbarians deals with the massacre and historical memory among modern Romanians.

== See also ==
- List of massacres in the Soviet Union
- List of massacres in Ukraine
- History of the Jews in Odesa
- Hostages Trial
- Romania in World War II
- The Holocaust in Romania
- Bibliography of the Soviet Union during World War II
- Bibliography of Ukrainian history § Holocaust

== Sources ==
- Dallin A. (1998). Odessa, 1941-1944: A Case Study of Soviet Territory Under Foreign Rule. Romanian Historical Studies. Iasi-Oxford-Portland. p. 296. ISBN 9739839118. Archived from the original on 28 September 2007.
- Cherkasov A.A. (2006). Defense of Odessa. Pages of truth. Great literary and artistic series "All Odessa" Issue 15. Odessa: Optimum. p. 296. ISBN 966-344-012-0. Archived from the original on 28 September 2007.
- Cherkasov A.A. (2007). Occupation of Odessa. Year 1941. Essays. Great literary and artistic series "All Odessa" Issue 15, Issue 18. Odessa: Optimum. p. 270. ISBN 978-966-344-144-3.
- Jewish. communities. center "Migdal" (2006). History of the Holocaust in the Odessa region. Collection of articles and documents. Great literary and artistic series "All Odessa" Issue 18. Odessa: Optimum. pp. 372 + [136] with illustrations, 22 tables. ISBN 966-344-144-5.
- Aleksandrovich I.A. (2014). The ways of death. Notes gettovtsa. Odessa: Art-Brand. pp. 240 with illustrations. ISBN 978-5-9901362-2-9.
