= 1st Special Purpose Brigade =

- 1-ша окрема бригада спеціального призначення
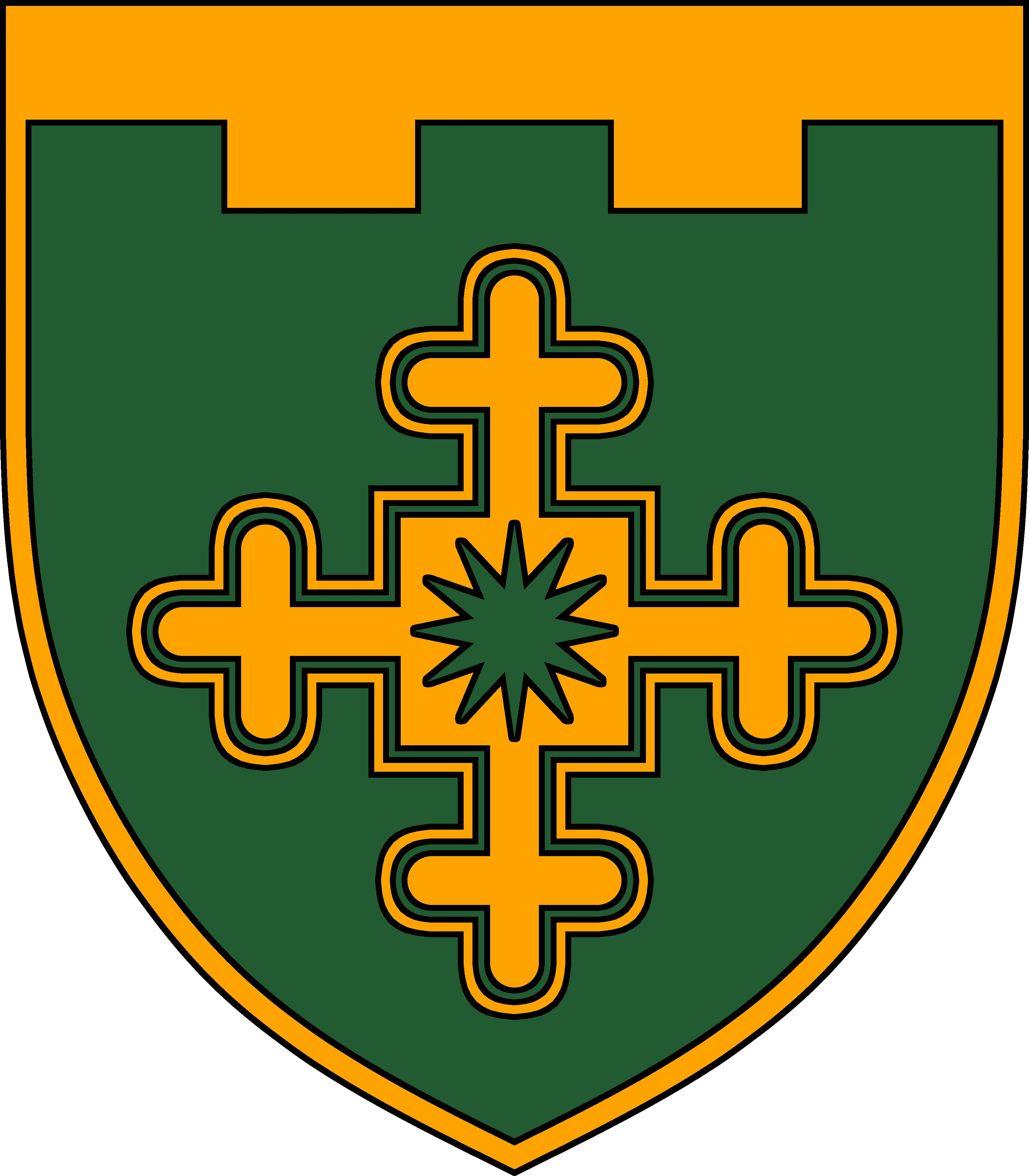
- Shoulder Sleeve Insignia
- Active: 4 March 2022 - present
- Country: Ukraine
- Branch: Ukrainian Ground Forces (till May 2024); Territorial Defence Forces
- Type: Brigade
- Role: Mechanized Infantry
- Part of: Territorial Defense Forces (Operational Command North)
- Engagements: Russian invasion of Ukraine
- Website: https://www.bohunbrigade.com

Commanders
- Current commander: Oleg Uminskyi

Insignia
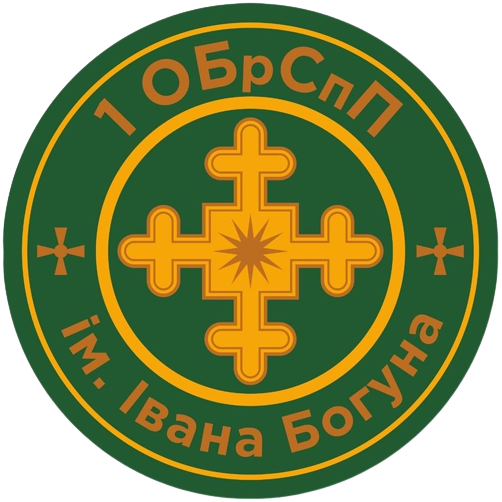
- Old patch 2022-2024

The 1st Territorial Defense Brigade, formerly the 1st Special Purpose Brigade "Ivan Bohun" (Ukrainian: 1-ша окрема бригада спеціального призначення ім. Івана Богуна) or the Bohun Brigade is a brigade of the Territorial Defense Forces formed in 2022 on the basis of a National Guard brigade transferred as a part of the Ukrainian Ground Forces. The Bohun Brigade includes, in addition to Ukrainians, citizens of 19 other countries.

The brigade has seen continuous fighting since its inception. As of 4 March 2023, 146 servicemen of the brigade has been KIA and 484 servicemen were awarded distinctions for their courage and heroism in battle.

Effective 9 May 2024, the brigade has been transferred out of IX Corps of the UGF, becoming a territorial brigade of the Territorial Defense Forces.

== Structure ==
As of 2024, the brigade's structure is as follows:

- 1st Special Purpose Brigade, N/A
  - Headquarters and HQ Company
  - 515th Special Purpose (Territorial) Battalion "Iron Wolves"
  - 516th Special Purpose (Territorial) Battalion
  - 517th Special Purpose (Territorial) Battalion "Haydamakis"
  - Tank Battalion
  - Field Artillery Regiment
  - Combat Support Battalion “Skelya”
  - UAV Company "Wild Bees"
  - Mortar Battery

=== Former units ===
- 518th Special Purpose Battalion "Wild Field" disbanded in early 2024 due to commander Andriy Malakhov's arrest for sharing sensitive information
- 43rd Territorial Defense Battalion

== Commanders ==
- Colonel Oleh Uminskyi 2022–2024
- Colonel Volodymyr Biliuk 2024–present
