= Dolge =

Dolge may refer to:

- Alfred Dolge, German-American industrialist
- Dolge Orlick, a character in the Charles Dickens novel Great Expectations
- Department of Local Government and the Environment (DoLGE), a governmental body in the Isle of Man

== See also ==
- Dolgeville, a village in New York State named for Alfred Dolge
- Dolgesheim, a village in Germany
- Dolge Njive, Gorenja Vas–Poljane, a settlement in Slovenia
- Dolge Njive, Lenart, a settlement in Slovenia
- Dovhe, Slovianoserbsk Raion, a settlement in eastern Ukraine called Dolge in Russian
- Doge (disambiguation)
