= Bershad =

City in Vinnytsia Oblast, Ukraine

Bershad Бершадь
- City
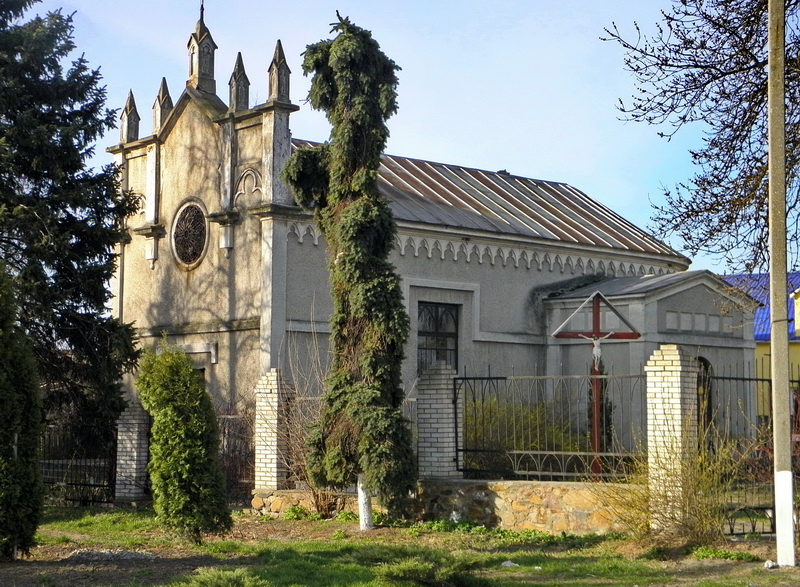
- Moszyński Chapel

- Flag Coat of arms

- Location within Vinnytsia Oblast Location within Ukraine
- Country: Ukraine
- Oblast: Vinnytsia Oblast
- Raion: Haisyn Raion
- Hromada: Bershad urban hromada

Population (2024)
  - Total: 11,742
- Time zone: UTC+2 (EET)
  - Summer (DST): UTC+3 (EEST)

Bershad (Ukrainian: Бершадь, IPA: [ˈbɛrʃɐdʲ]; Polish: Berszad) is a city in Vinnytsia Oblast, Ukraine, located in the historic region of Podolia. Until 2020 it was the administrative center of the former Bershad Raion.

== History ==
Historical affiliations

Grand Duchy of Lithuania 1459–1569
Polish–Lithuanian Commonwealth 1569–1672
Ottoman Empire 1672–1699
Polish–Lithuanian Commonwealth 1699–1793
Russian Empire 1793–1917
Ukrainian People's Republic 1917–1918, 1918–1920
Ukrainian State 1918
Soviet Ukraine 1920–1922
Soviet Union 1922–1941
Kingdom of Romania 1941–1944
Soviet Union 1944–1991
Ukraine 1991–present

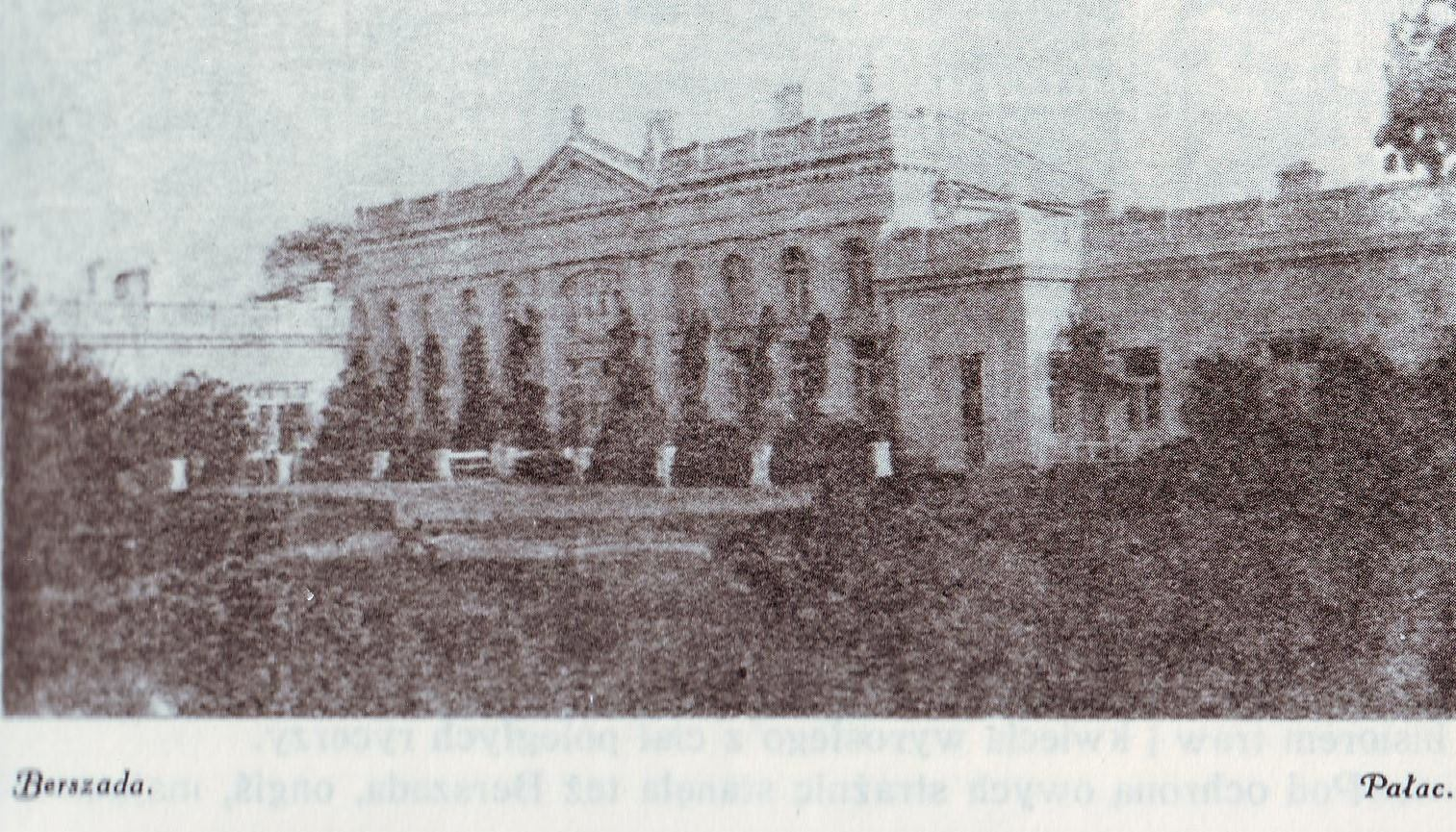
Former Moszyński Palace in Bershad

The first extant mention of Bershad appears in 1459. It was a private town of Poland, owned by the families of Zbaraski and Moszyński. Polish nobleman Piotr Stanisław Moszyński built a palace complex in Bershad. The only remaining parts of the complex are the park and the chapel of the Moszyński and Jurjewicz families.

In 1648, during the Khmelnytsky Uprising under the Cossacks, Maksym Kryvonis conquered Bershad and slew many of the Catholics and Jews there. Before World War II, the city had an important Jewish community. Bershad was famous in the middle of the nineteenth century for its Jewish weavers of the tallit, a ritual shawl worn by Jews at prayer. By the end of the century, the demand decreased, and the industry declined, leading many weavers to emigrate to America. In 1900 the Jewish population of Bershad was 4,500, out of a total population of 7,000. The Jewish artisans numbered about 500. The community possessed synagogues and several houses of prayer. One synagogue survived World War II and was not closed during Soviet times. It is still active. Many Jews worldwide bear a "Bershidsky/Bershadsky" surname referring to the town.

During World War II, Romanian forces allied with the Nazi Germans transformed the Bershad area into a ghetto as part of the Romanian-occupied Transnistria Governorate. Many of the ghetto victims were Jews brought in from Bessarabia. Thousands of Jews were starved to death or died because of typhus in the ghetto during the Holocaust, including the writer and poet Mordechai Goldenberg. According to the Yad Vashem database, the number of Jews who died in Bershad whose names are available, including from among the deportees, who died in the Holocaust was 6,101. Among the Jews who died during the Holocaust in Bershad, 1,774 had lived before the war in Bessarabia according to the Yad Vashem database. Among the Jews who died during the Holocaust in Bershad, 2,806 had lived before the war in Bukovina according to the Yad Vashem database. In fact, more than 8,000 Jews died because of disease (typhus), hunger and cold during the winter of 1941 - 1942. On January 31, 1943, after the situation had improved in terms of deaths due to typhus, there were 9,250 Jews in Bershad, out of which 6,950 were Romanian Jews, including 3,200 from Bessarabia, 3,500 from Bukovina and 50 to 60 from the Old Kingdom of Romania (Dorohoi County), 2,250 local (Transnistrian) Jews, and 2,477 orphans. After 2,203 Jews were relocated, on September 1, 1943, there 2343 5,261 Jews in Bershad (excluding the native Transnistrian Jews), 1998 from Bessarabia and 3,263 from Bukovina. The Germans killed a number of Jews for allegedly helping the partisans during their retreat, before the arrival of the Soviet troops. The number of Jews killed in this way, as well as those killed as retribution for the Jewish support for the pro-Soviet partisans, was 327. According to the Jewish Virtual Library, "Local Jews organized an armed underground and later took to the forest and joined Soviet partisan units."

== Sports ==
Bershad is home to the football club FC Nyva Bershad.

== Notable people ==
- Yury Kovalenko (1977–2014), a Ukrainian military leader, Hero of Ukraine
- Anatoliy Matviyenko (1953–2020), a Ukrainian politician
- Witold Pruszkowski (1846–1896), a Polish painter, was born in Bershad
- Roman Shvartsman (born 1936), a chairman of the Odessa regional Association of Jews – former prisoners of ghetto and Nazi concentration camps
- Nadezhda Ulanovskaya (1903–1986), a Soviet intelligence GRU officer
