= Bershad Synagogue =

Synagogue in Bershad, Ukraine

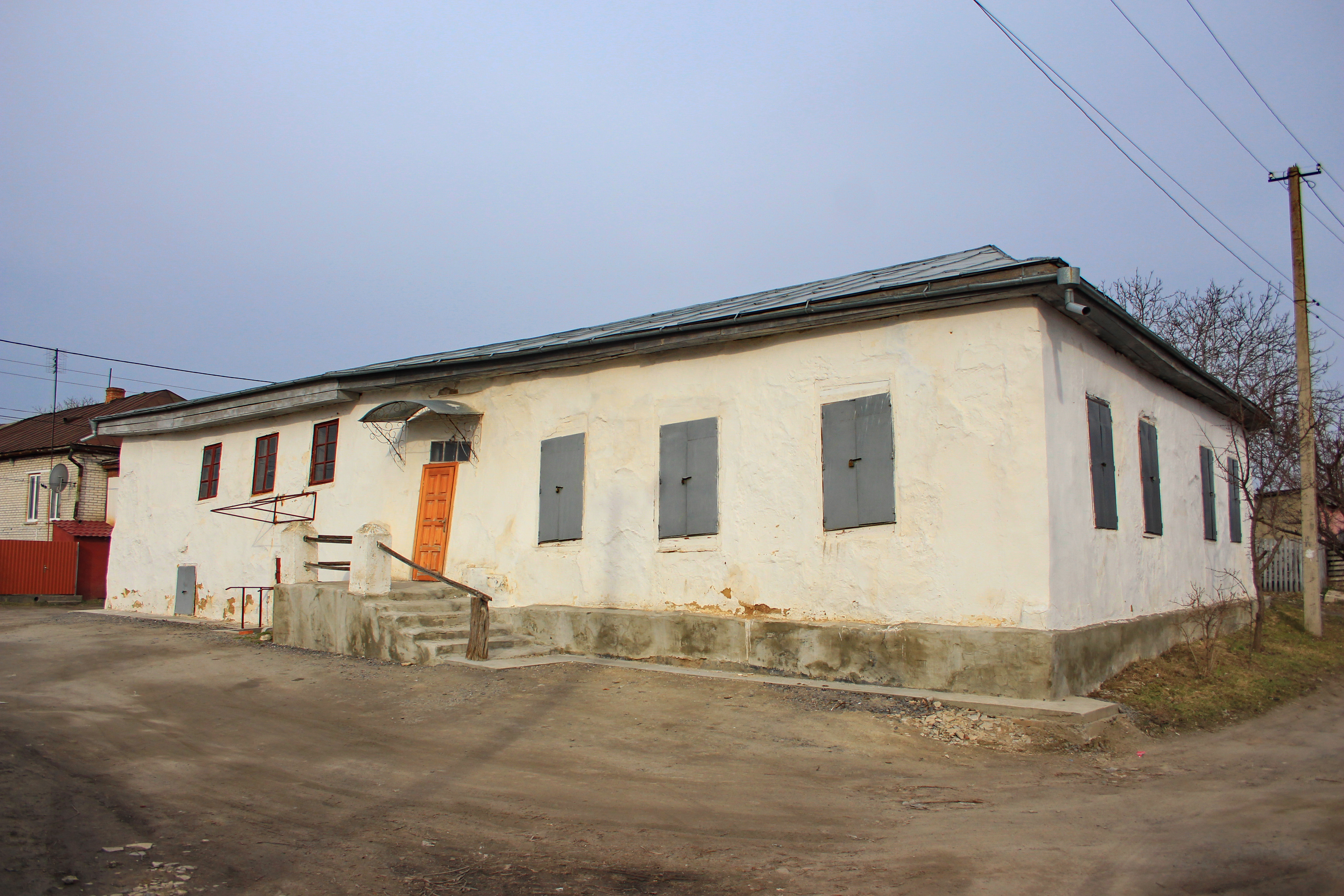
- Synagogue in Bershad

- Location of the synagogue in Ukraine

Religion
- Affiliation: Orthodox Judaism
- Rite: Nusach Ashkenaz
- Ecclesiastical or organizational status: Synagogue
- Status: Active

Location
- Location: Narodna Street, Bershad, Vinnytsia Oblast 24400
- Country: Ukraine
- Interactive map of Bershad Synagogue
- Coordinates: 48°21′45″N 29°31′09″E

Architecture
- Completed: Early 19th century

Specifications
- Length: 21 metres (69 ft)
- Width: 12 metres (39 ft)
- Height (max): 6 metres (20 ft)
- Materials: Timber

The Bershad Synagogue is an Orthodox Jewish synagogue, located on Narodna Street, in Bershad, in the Vinnytsia Oblast of Ukraine. Built in the beginning of the 19th century, it is one of the very few synagogues in Ukraine that was neither destroyed during World War II nor closed by the Soviet authorities in the years after the war.

The synagogue is still used by the small Jewish community of Bershad that worships in the Ashkenazi rite. It is not to be confused with the magnificent Great Synagogue, which does no longer exist.

== Architecture ==
The walls of the synagogue are wattle and daub and white-washed, looking like a common rural building. Its outer dimensions are approximately 21 metres (69 ft) in length and 12 metres (39 ft) in width, the height to the cornice is c. 3.3 metres (11 ft) with a total height of 6 metres (20 ft).

The synagogue has two main rooms: the men's prayer hall and a western room, which is 2-tired and contains the women's section and perhaps living quarters. An inner wall separates the two rooms.

There are eight wooden columns that support the two large wooden beams of the ceiling. The columns divide the space of the prayer hall into three naves. The Bimah has a simple, square, wooden construction. It is surrounded by four round wooden columns, sits in the centre of the prayer hall and is elevated by one step. Above it on the ceiling is a large Star of David. The Holy Ark, a carved wooden closet, is situated on the western wall. There is no niche for the Tora Ark.

== See also ==
- History of the Jews in Ukraine
- List of synagogues in Ukraine
