= Bershad Raion =

Former subdivision of Vinnytsia Oblast, Ukraine

Coordinates: 48°22′22″N 29°31′57″E

Bershad Raion Бершадський район
- Raion
- Flag Coat of arms

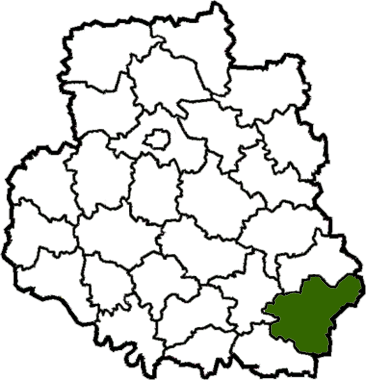
- Country: Ukraine
- Oblast: Vinnytsia Oblast
- Established: 1923
- Disestablished: 18 July 2020
- Admin. center: Bershad
- Subdivisions: List: — city councils; 1 — settlement councils; 28 — rural councils; Number of localities: — cities; 1 — urban-type settlements; 40 — villages; — rural settlements

Government
  - Governor: Myhaylo Burlaka

Area
  - Total: 1,285.8 km^{2} (496.5 sq mi)

Population (2020)
  - Total: 56,776 ▼
  - Density: 44.156/km^{2} (114.36/sq mi)
- Time zone: UTC+02:00 (EET)
  - Summer (DST): UTC+03:00 (EEST)
- Postal index: 23000—23063
- Area code: +380 4341
- Website: http://rdabershad.gov.ua

Bershad Raion (Ukrainian: Бершадський район) was one of raions of Vinnytsia Oblast, located in southwestern Ukraine. The administrative center of the raion was the town of Bershad. The raion was abolished and its territory was merged into Haisyn Raion on 18 July 2020 as part of the administrative reform of Ukraine, which reduced the number of raions of Vinnytsia Oblast to six. The last estimate of the raion population was 56,776 (2020 est.).
