= Nicolae Macici =

Romanian general

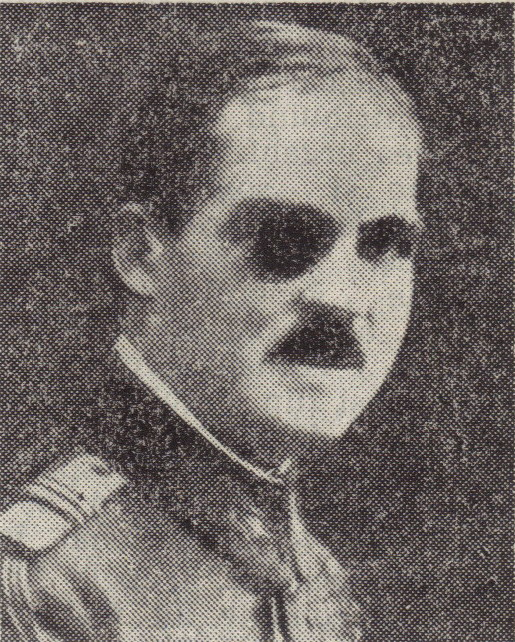
- Born: 7 November 1886; Craiova, Kingdom of Romania
- Died: 15 June 1950 (aged 63); Aiud Prison, Cluj Region, Romanian People's Republic
- Burial place: Aiud Prison cemetery
- Alma mater: Carol I National Defence University
- Spouse: Ileana Macici (née Dobo) (m. 1933)
- Military career
- Allegiance: Romania
- Branch: Romanian Land Forces
- Service years: 1907–1945
- Rank: Lieutenant general
- Commands: 2nd Army Corps; First Army
- Conflicts / battles: Second Balkan War; World War I; World War II; Eastern Front; Operation München; Siege of Odessa; Second Jassy–Kishinev offensive; Battle of Turda; Battle of Debrecen; Budapest Offensive; Western Carpathian offensive
- Awards: Order of Michael the Brave; Order of the Crown

Nicolae Macici (7 November 1886 – 15 June 1950) was a Romanian lieutenant general during World War II, when he commanded the Romanian First Army, first on the side of the Axis (1941–1944) and then on the side of the Allies (1944–1945). Convicted in 1945 by the Bucharest People's Tribunal as a war criminal for his role in the Odessa massacre, he was sentenced to death, albeit his sentence was later commuted to life prison. Macici died at Aiud Prison five years later.

== Biography ==
=== Early years and World War I ===
Born in Craiova, he started Infantry Officer School in 1905. He graduated in 1907 with the rank of 2nd lieutenant, in the same class as future generals Constantin Sănătescu and Gheorghe Mihail. Promoted to lieutenant in 1910, he participated in 1913 in the Second Balkan War. From October 1913 to March 1915 he attended the Higher War School in Bucharest and was promoted captain.

After the Kingdom of Romania entered World War I on the side of the Allies in August 1916, Macici fought in the Romanian Campaign. He commanded a machine-gun company from the 41st Infantry Regiment in the battles at Merișor and the Vulcan Pass. For these actions he was awarded in April 1917 the Order of Michael the Brave, 3rd class, and promoted to the rank of major. Later that year, at the Battle of Mărășești, he lost his right eye.

=== The interwar period ===
After the end of the war, he advanced to lieutenant colonel (April 1920) and colonel (July 1927), serving as Chief of Staff for the 2nd, 16th, and 18th Infantry Divisions. In 1928 he took command of the 92nd Infantry Regiment in Orăștie, where he met Ileana Dobo, whom he married in 1933. (Born in 1913, she was the daughter of Doctor Romulus Dobo, a descendant of István Dobó.) From 1932 to 1934, he was the commanding officer at the Land Forces Academy in Sibiu, after which he commanded the 17th Infantry Brigade. Upon being promoted to the rank of brigadier general in August 1937, Macici became commander of the 9th Infantry Division. In May 1939 he was in command of the Constanța garrison. He rose to the rank of major general in October 1939 and was appointed commander of the 2nd Army Corps, stationed in Northern Dobruja, on 10 September 1940.

=== World War II ===
On 22 June 1941, Romania joined Operation Barbarossa on the side of the Axis, in order to reclaim the lost territories of Bessarabia and Northern Bukovina, which had been annexed by the Soviet Union in June 1940. Macici fought with the 2nd Army Corps against the Soviets in the Danube Delta during Operation München, and later advanced towards Odessa. When the city fell on 6 October 1941 after a 2 month siege, Macici and his 2nd Corps took over the city's garrison. On 22 October, a bomb went off at the headquarters of the Romanian 10th Infantry Division, killing 67 people, including 16 officers. Marshal Ion Antonescu ordered reprisals against Jews and Communists; this event became known as the 1941 Odessa massacre. On 23 October, General Iosif Iacobici ordered Macici to travel to Odessa, with the mission of installing General Nicolae Ghineraru at the command of the 10th Infantry Division, to investigate the causes of the attack, and to organize military activity in the city. On 24 October, Macici received a telegram from Antonescu, ordering the execution of all Jews who had taken refuge in Odessa, as well as all people arrested in connection with the bombing; the order was carried out later that day by Lt. Colonels Nicolae Deleanu and Mihail Niculescu.

On 9 November 1941, he became commander of the First Army, which was based in Romania. He was promoted to Lieutenant General in January 1942 and didn't see much action until the Second Jassy–Kishinev Offensive of August 1944. After King Michael's Coup of 23 August 1944, Romania switched sides and became an enemy of Germany. The First Army suddenly had to fight the German troops based in Romania, but was able to hold the Carpathian Mountains passes until Soviet reinforcements arrived.

Macici remained at the head of the First Army and participated in the advance in Transylvania and joint Soviet–Romanian attack on Hungary and Slovakia. In the fall of 1944 he fought at battles on the Cerna, Mureș, and Crișul Alb rivers. He then participated in the Battle of Debrecen and the Budapest Offensive, where he suffered a serious defeat in the Battle of Szolnok, when the commander of the 4th Infantry Division, General Platon Chirnoagă, was taken prisoner by the Germans. Nonetheless, in late 1944 the troops under his command took hold of the Budapest Airport and, at his order, flew the Romanian flag above it. In January–February 1945, Macici fought with the 1st Army in the Western Carpathian offensive, alongside the Romanian 4th Army, led by General Nicolae Dăscălescu, under the overall command of Marshal Rodion Malinovsky. He was relieved of his command on 12 February 1945.

=== Last years ===
Recalled to Bucharest, Macici was arrested and incarcerated at the Arsenal, together with other military leaders. He was put on trial in May 1945 for war crimes committed during the occupation of Transnistria, in particular, for the reprisals against the civilian population during the 1941 Odessa massacre. The charges were brought before the Bucharest People's Tribunal and the presiding judge, Alexandru Voitinovici, by prosecutors Avram Bunaciu and Dumitru Săracu. The tribunal sentenced him to death, but this sentence was later commuted to life in prison by King of Romania Michael I. After being detained at prisons in Jilava and Dumbrăveni, Macici was sent to Aiud Prison, where he was put in an isolation unit called "Zarca". He died there on 15 June 1950, and was buried in the penitentiary's cemetery.

== Legacy and appeal ==
In July 1995, the Romanian First Army Corps "General Nicolae Macici" was awarded its battle flag through a decree signed by President Ion Iliescu.

His son, Nicolae Macici (residing in Montreal), submitted a request for revision of the People's Tribunal 1945 sentence; the appeal was rejected in October 2020 by the Bucharest Military Appeals Court. In May 2021, the High Court of Cassation and Justice vacated the Appeals Court's ruling, and remanded the case to the lower court for further deliberation. In March 2022 the Military Court of Appeal rejected the demand for rehabilitation and on 22 September 2022 the High Court of Cassation and Justice upheld the lower court's decision.
