= Dolge Njive, Gorenja Vas–Poljane =

Dolge Njive
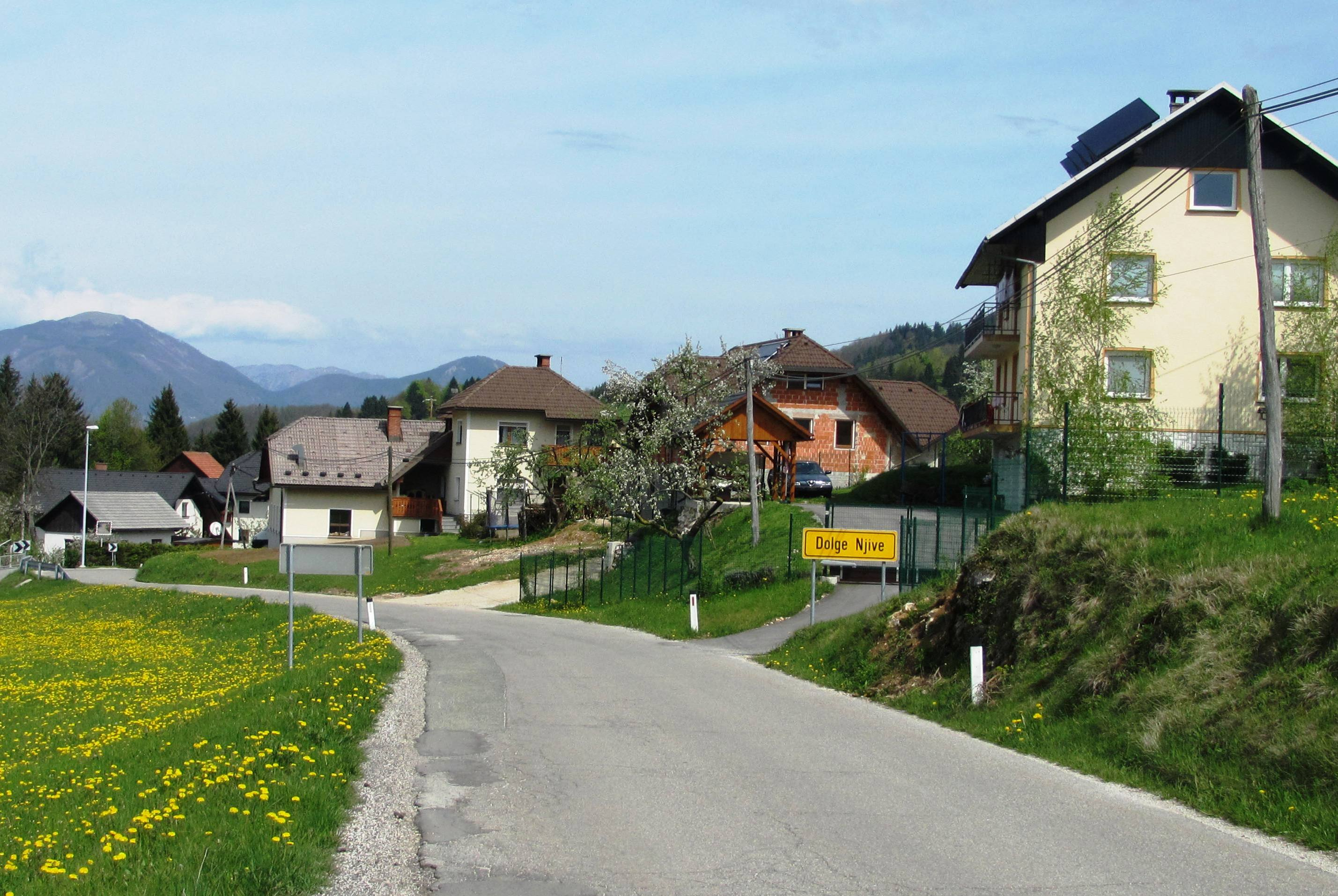
- Dolge Njive

- Location in Slovenia
- Coordinates: 46°3′26.21″N 14°11′43.23″E
- Country: Slovenia
- Traditional region: Upper Carniola
- Statistical region: Upper Carniola
- Municipality: Gorenja Vas–Poljane

Area
  - Total: 0.90 km^{2} (0.35 sq mi)
- Elevation: 657.9 m (2,158 ft)

Population (2020)
  - Total: 62
  - Density: 69/km^{2} (180/sq mi)

Dolge Njive (pronounced [ˈdoːu̯ɡɛ ˈnjiːʋɛ]) is a small settlement next to Lučine in the Municipality of Gorenja Vas–Poljane in the Upper Carniola region of Slovenia.

== Name ==
The name Dolge Njive means 'long fields', referring to agricultural arrangements in the area. Dolge Njive was attested in historical sources as Dolgonibo in 1291 and Dolgeniue in 1500.
