= Andriy Malakhov =

Ukrainian soldier

- Андрій Малахов
- Born: Andriy Oleksandrovych Malakhov
- Military career
- Allegiance: Ukraine
- Branch: Armed Forces of Ukraine
- Rank: Podpolkovnik
- Nickname: Tuman (Туман)
- Conflicts: Russo-Ukrainian War
- Awards: Order of Bohdan Khmelnytsky; Medal For Military Service to Ukraine; Defender of the Motherland Medal

Andriy Oleksandrovych Malakhov (Ukrainian: Андрій Олександрович Малахов) is a Ukrainian soldier, podpolkovnik of the Armed Forces of Ukraine, a participant of the Russian-Ukrainian war.

== Biography ==
He has been at the front from 2014. As of 2021, he is the former head of the intelligence department of the headquarters of the detachment of the 3rd Separate Special Purpose Regiment of the Special Forces of the Armed Forces of Ukraine. In the first half of 2018, the detachment under the command of Lieutenant Andriy Malakhov destroyed at least 15 units of enemy military equipment in the temporarily occupied territories.

In 2015, he became the head of the "ATO Warriors" party.

On 27 February 2019, he was registered as a trustee of the presidential candidate Serhii Kryvonos in the regular presidential elections in Ukraine on 31 March 2019.

=== Russian invasion (2022) ===
From 1 June 2022, he was the commander of the 518th Dyke Pole Battalion.

==== Slobozhanskyi counter-offensive (2022) ====
On 6–7 September 2022, the battalion conducted successful offensive and assault operations on the occupiers' positions along the line: Shchurivka – Nova Husarivka – Bairak and established full control over these settlements of the Kharkiv Oblast and the approaches to them.

On 8 September 2022, a decision was made to continue offensive operations on the Balakliia – Savyntsi front, where enemy units were cut off from the main forces and logistics supply lines. During the battle of Balakliia, Commander Malakhov was wounded twice in the leg and once in the thigh.

He personally led the assault group of the Dyke Pole battalion, which successfully crossed the Siverskyi Donets River and liberated the village of Vilkhuvatka. After the assault group gained a foothold on the outskirts of the village, the occupiers brought in reserves and engaged the Ukrainian unit. In direct contact with the enemy, Captain Andriy Malakhov received a bullet wound, but together with his men, he inflicted significant losses on the enemy and forced them to retreat. Captain Andriy Malakhov received his pseudonym from the Commander-in-Chief of the Armed Forces of Ukraine Valerii Zaluzhnyi, who was impressed by the military's ability to conduct operations in the occupied territory while remaining invisible.

== Awards ==
- Order of Bohdan Khmelnytsky, 2nd class (19 July 2022), 3rd class (21 August 2017)
- Medal For Military Service to Ukraine (23 July 2016)
- Defender of the Motherland Medal (27 February 2017)

== Military ranks ==
- Podpolkovnik (as of 2025)
- Major (as of 2024)
- Captain (as of 2023)
- Senior Lieutenant (as of 2022)
- Junior Lieutenant (as of 2017)
- Sergeant (as of 2016)
