= Yuriy Kovalenko (Podpolkovnik) =

Ukrainian military leader

- Born: Yuriy Viktorovych Kovalenko; 16 July 1977; Bershad, Vinnytsia Oblast, Ukrainian SSR, USSR
- Died: 15 July 2014 (aged 36); Izvaryne-Donetsk, Luhansk Oblast, Ukraine
- Military career
- Allegiance: Ukraine
- Branch: Ukrainian Ground Forces
- Rank: Lieutenant colonel
- Conflicts: Russo-Ukrainian War; War in Donbas; Battle on the Border †
- Awards: Order of the Gold Star

Yuriy Viktorovych Kovalenko (Ukrainian: Юрій Вікторович Коваленко; 16 July 1977 – 15 July 2014) was a Ukrainian military leader, Lieutenant colonel of the Armed Forces of Ukraine, the deputy commander of the 3rd spetsnaz regiment (Kirovohrad) South operational command of the Land forces. Hero of Ukraine.

== Biography ==
Born in Bershad in Vinnytsia. He grew up in a military family - submarine officer. He studied at the secondary school No.2 Bershadska. He graduated from the Odesa Military Institute of Land Forces. Military service, first in Dnipropetrovsk (in one of the regiments of the 93rd Mechanised Division), then - in the Kirovohrad.

He participated in the War in Donbass in eastern Ukraine since the beginning in May 2014. His detachment was guarding military facilities, accompanying weights and participated in intelligence operations and battles.

During the clashes, Yuriy Kovalenko destroyed fifteen armed enemies. To carry out tasks for the protection of the Ukrainian-Russian border near the village of the failures of the Sverdlovsk region, Luhansk Oblast. For a successful breakthrough intelligence unit he received the rank of Lieutenant colonel through the enemy order of battle. In one of the battles personally rescued a wounded soldier.

He was fatally shot on 15 July 2014 during the mortar bombardment. He was buried on 24 July (Florina Cemetery). Kovalenko was survived by his wife and two daughters.
