= Roman Shvartsman =

Ukrainian Jewish concentration camp survivor (born 1936)

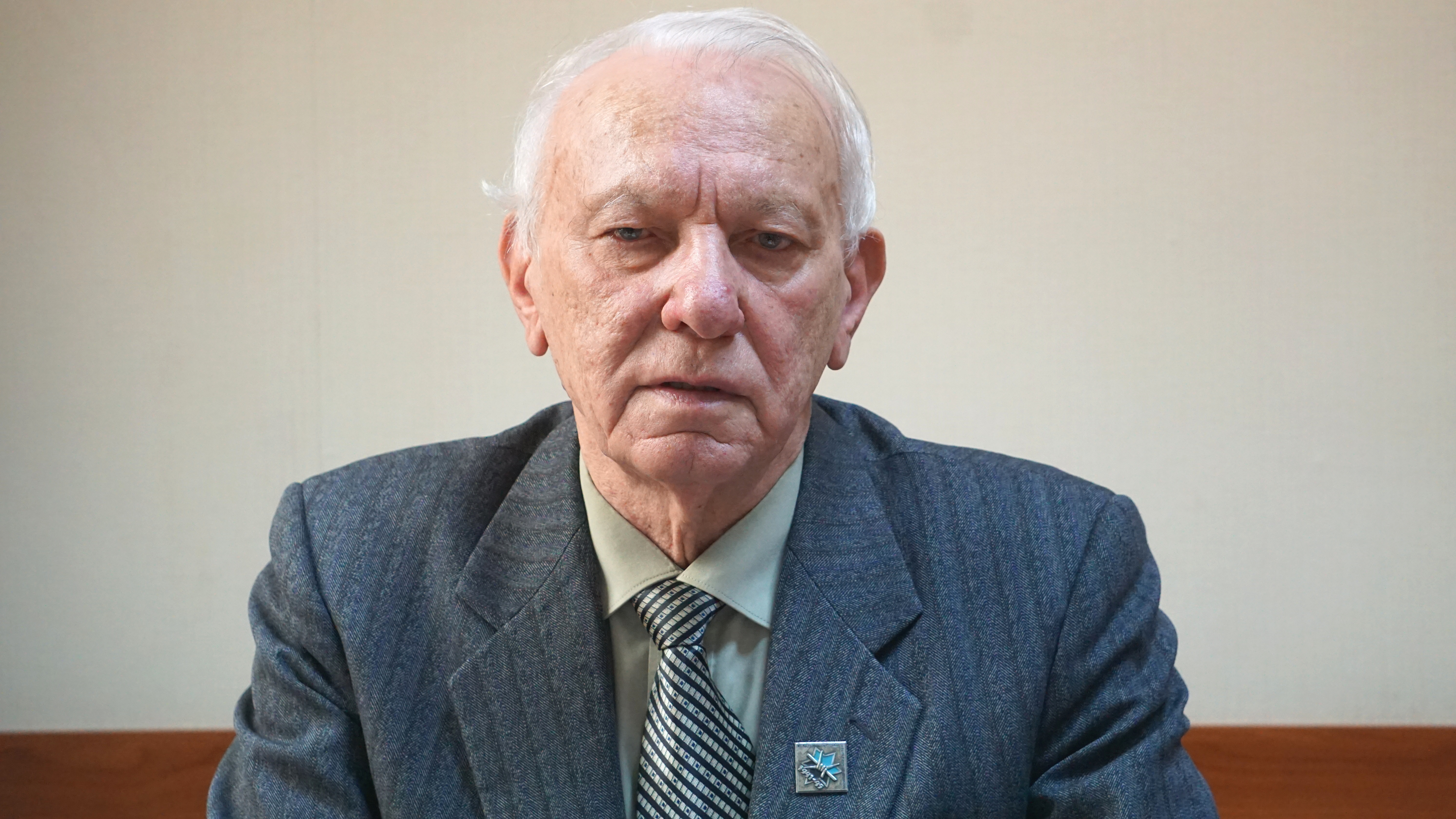
- Shvartsman in his office
- Born: Shvartsman Ruvin Mordkovich; November 7, 1936 (age 89); Bershad, Ukrainian SSR, Soviet Union
- Education: Odesa National Maritime University
- Occupations: Public figure; Chairman of Odesa regional Association of Jews – former prisoners of ghetto and Nazi concentration camps
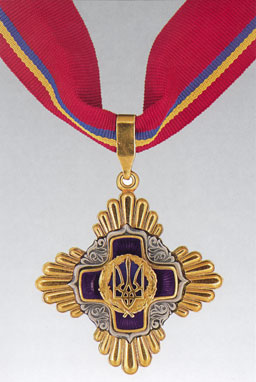
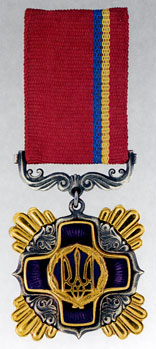
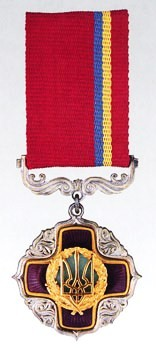
- Awards

Roman Markovych Shvartsman (Ukrainian: Роман Маркович Шварцман; born November 7, 1936) is chairman of the Odesa regional Association of Jews – former prisoners of ghetto and Nazi concentration camps.

He is Vice President of the Ukrainian Association of Jews - former prisoners of ghetto and Nazi concentration camps, and Chairman of the Association of Boris Zabarko.

He is also Deputy chairman of the Council of Odesa society of Jewish culture and Manager of its social and cultural center.

== Biography ==
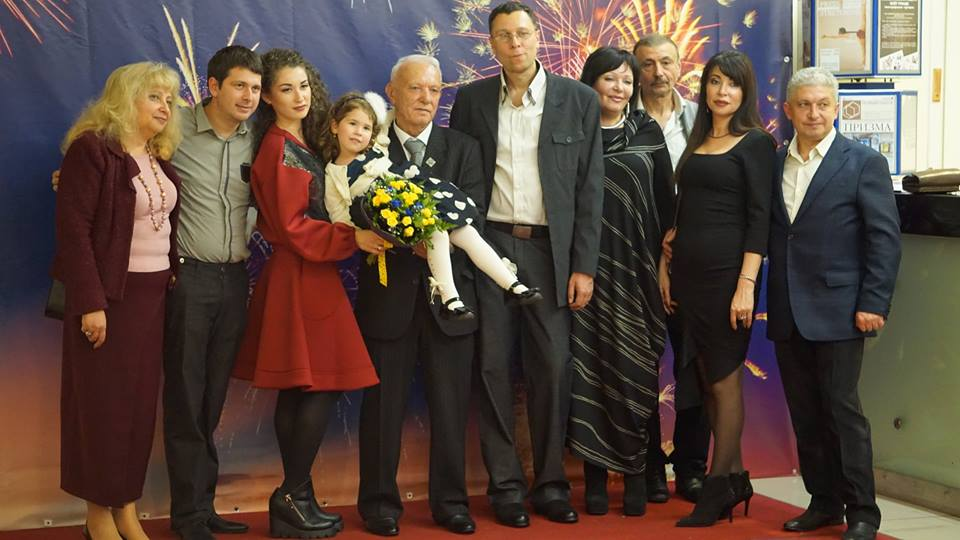
Shvartsman with his family

Shvartsman was born in 1936, in a simple Jewish family in the city of Bershad, Vinnytsia Oblast. The family had nine children, the seventh of whom was Roman Shvartsman. His mother was a housewife, his father worked at the Bershad distillery as a security guard. When the Second World War ended, all archival and personal documents were burned and then, to restore the age of Roman, a doctor of the local clinic conducted an external examination.

In 1955, he moved to Odesa, where he entered the vocational school No. 2, in 1956, he received a specialty fitter. From 1957 to 1963 he studied at the Odesa National Maritime Academy, with a speciality as engineer-mechanic.

Roman began his career at the Odesa plant Poligrafmash, where he works now. There is only one entry in his workbook.

In 1959, Roman married.

In 1992 Roman became a member of the international organization of former ghetto prisoners and concentration camps, which was founded in Odesa in 1991.

Currently, he remains a permanent and active member of the organization. In 1991, at the first Congress, the members of the international organization decided to create a regional Association of former prisoners of ghettos and concentration camps, and the headquarters of the international Union was moved to Moscow.

In 1991 the Odesa regional Association of the former prisoners of the ghetto was created, where Roman was deputy chairman, which at that time was Leonid Sushon.

In 2002, at the Odesa regional conference, dedicated to the results of the Association, Roman was elected Chairman of the Association, the head of which he is to date.

He contributes to the annual commemoration on January 27, in the Prokhorovsky square, of the International day of remembrance of the victims of the Holocaust He has been a guest of honor at international conferences on the topic of the Holocaust.

He was involved in the development and improvement of the Holocaust Museum, which was created and opened by the Association of prisoners in 2009.

== Awards ==
- Order of Merit (Ukraine), 1st class (2018)
- Order of Merit (Ukraine), 2nd class (2013)
- Order of Merit (Ukraine), 3rd class (2006)
- Medal "For Distinguished Labour" (1977)
- Honoured Mechanical Engineer of the Ukrainian SSR (1989)
- Medal "Veteran of Labour" (1985)
- Mark of distinction in front of Odesa
- Jubilee medal for the State and International merit
- Badge of honor the mayor of Odesa "Labour glory"

== Public activity ==
=== Odesa regional Association of former ghetto prisoners and concentration camps ===
In Odesa the first constituent Congress was created, in which was created the International Union of Jews - former prisoners of ghettos and Nazi concentration camps. And only a few years later such associations opened in Kyiv and Moscow.

In 1991 the Odesa regional Association of the former prisoners of the ghetto and concentration camps was created.

The main purpose of the Association is to unite Jews-former prisoners of the ghetto and Nazi concentration camps, during the Second World War, protect their rights and freedoms, coordinate the activities of the associations, located on the territory of Odesa and Odesa Oblast. The objectives of the Association: countering fascism, extremism and other manifestations of racial discrimination, identification of places of mass destruction of Jews during the Second World War, perpetuating the memory of genocide victims, perpetuation and search of people, saving Jews, in order to grant them the title of Righteous among the Nations of the world.

=== Monuments to the victims of the Holocaust ===
Particular mention should be made of the activities of the Chairman of the Odesa regional organization of former prisoners of ghetto and concentration camps, Roman Shvartsman: through his efforts it became possible to establish in Odesa, the Odesa region and Mykolaiv region area more than thirty monuments and memorials, dedicated to the memory of Jews, destroyed in the Disaster.

In memory of the victims of the Holocaust on the Lustdorf road, 27 a Memorial complex was built; each year on 23 October a mourning rally occurs.

In this place was found three additional sites with remains, and probably there are two more. Romanian and German occupiers burned 25,000 Jewish children, women, and elderly people.

As Roman Schwartzman commented:»

"Anywhere you dig, you'll find bones-teeth and skulls and it's terrible"

In Prokhorovsky Square, on the site of the Holocaust memorial (road of death), created by the prisoner of the Bogdanovka concentration camp, Yakov Maniovich, under the guidance of Roman Shvartsman events are constantly held for the care of monuments and the alley of the Righteous Among the Nations.

In 2016 in the town of Balta, on central square the memorial to the victims of the Holocaust was opened, a memorial to the victims of the Holocaust and the Righteous of the Nations of the world, including Queen Elena of Romania.

The monuments are also open in the village of Domanovka, Bogdanovka, in the city of Bilhorod-Dnistrovskyi, in the city of Savran, the city of Bessarabske and many other settlements on the territory of the former Romanian Transnistria Governorate.

According to Roman Shvartsman, about 240,000 Jews were killed by the Nazis in the territory of Transnistria. In 2015 in the village of Gvozdavka 2 a mass grave was discovered with the remains of about 3,500 Jews. Later a memorial sign was placed there.
