= Dovhe, Alchevsk Raion, Luhansk Oblast =

Dovhe Довге
- Village
- Location of Dovhe within Ukraine Dovhe (Ukraine)
- Coordinates: 48.642778°N 39.039722°E
- Country: Ukraine
- Oblast: Luhansk Oblast
- Raion: Alchevsk Raion
- Hromada: Zymohiria urban hromada
- Founded: 1960

Area
  - Total: 0.467 km^{2} (0.180 sq mi)
- Elevation: 77 m (253 ft)

Population (2001 census)
  - Total: 311
  - Density: 666/km^{2} (1,720/sq mi)
- Time zone: UTC+2 (EET)
  - Summer (DST): UTC+3 (EEST)
- Postal code: 93704
- Area code: +380 6473

Dovhe (Ukrainian: Довге; Russian: Долгое) is a village in Zymohiria urban hromada, Alchevsk Raion (district), Luhansk Oblast (region), Ukraine, at about 30 km WNW from the centre of Luhansk city, on the right bank of the Siverskyi Donets river.

The settlement was taken under control of pro-Russian forces during the war in Donbas, that started in 2014.
