= Mostyshche =

Mostyshche Мостище
- Village
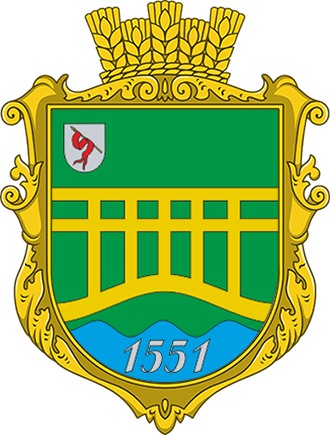
- Coat of arms
- Interactive map of Mostyshche
- Coordinates: 49°4′13″N 24°20′33″E
- Country: Ukraine

Population
  - Total: 1,026

Mostyshche is a village in Kalush district, Ivano-Frankivsk region, Ukraine.

== Origins of the name ==
The original name of the village is Dovhe (ukr. dovhe - eng. long). The word mostyshche (eng. big bridge) comes from the location of the village next to the bridge across the Kropyvnyk river.

== History ==
=== Establishment ===
The village was founded in 1551. The first of its inhabitants were seven men with their families: Andriy Kravtsovych, Marko Lytvyn, Ivan Popovych, Yats'ko Popovych, Ivan Stankovych, Dan'ko Derkachovych. While in 1564 only 7 families lived in Mostyshche, since 1670 there were already 45 peasant farms.

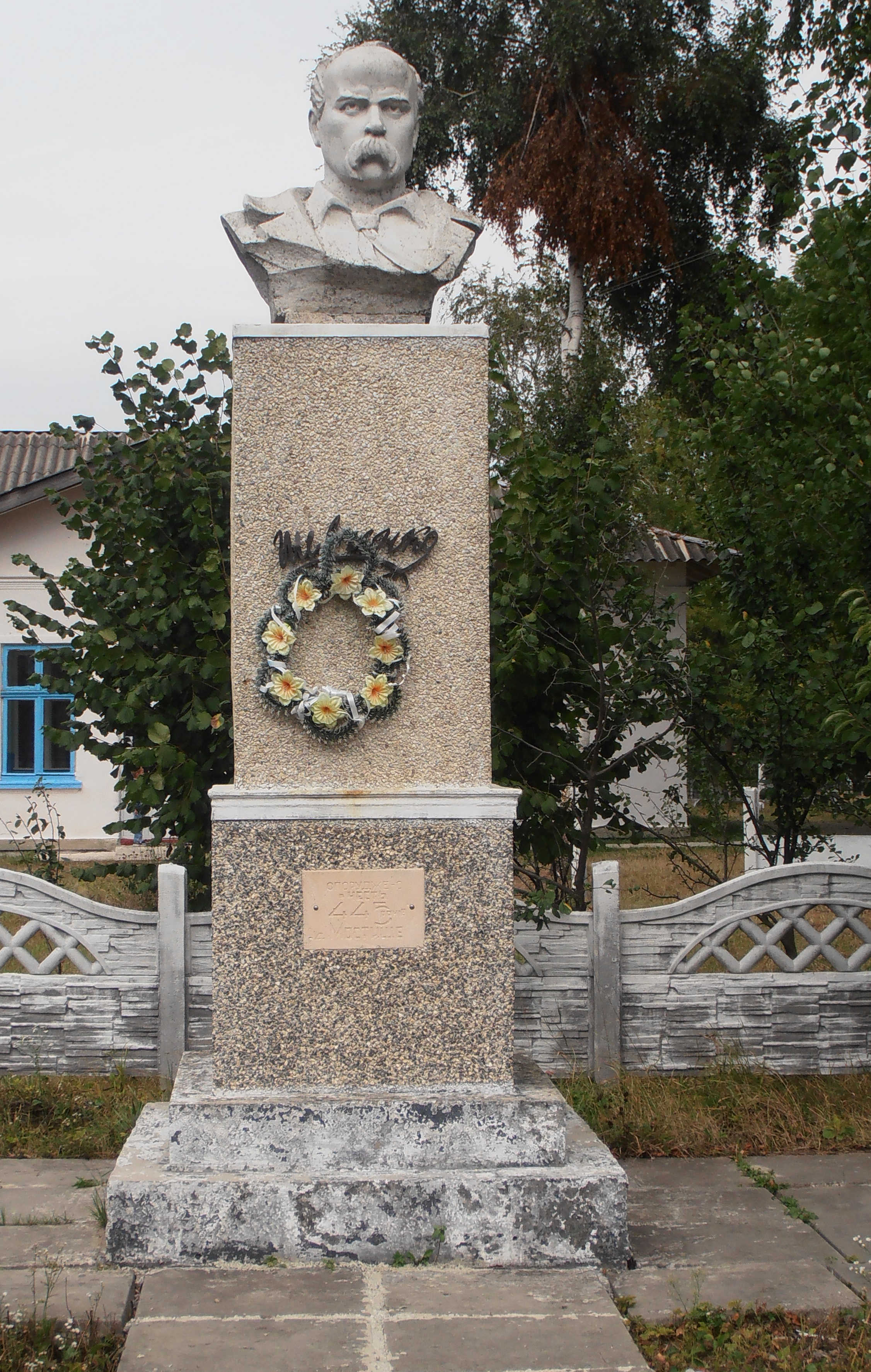
Bust of Taras Shevchenko

According to the old-timers of the village, Dovhe village could be located to the west of the current Mostyshche village. The today's landscape of people's plots still has the marks of previous land division in Dovhe village. Excavations of local residents showed the presence of antiques, but there is a need for archaeological excavations. According to the local historians, the village was burnt by tatars and rebuild later, and at the territory of the current woodshed there were fields.

=== Renaissance ===
After the 1848 revolution and abolition of serfdom the land plots and the forest in the village were divided between the peasants. The part of the land the community left undivided for community use. A polonyna next to the village Duba was also in the ownership of the community, but it was sold in 1870 when the church was being built.

In 1880 there were 977 residents of the village and 9 at the surrounding area (majority - Greek Catholic, 20 - Roman Catholics). There were local Greek Catholic parish and permanent one-class school.

A manuscript of Ukrainian drama "Povist' o zburenni pekla" (eng. The tale of the perturbation of hell) by Ivan Franko was found in the village. In 1899-1914 a public courtyard with a tavern was leased by the community. In 1902 the community of the village built a school, that works till today. In 1898 a branch of the Prosvita Society was opened in Mostyshche to oppose russophile policy of the local prist Arsen Avdykovsky. In 1915 after the return of the Austrian troops several people were accused to be Moscowphiles and sent to the concentration camp Talerhof. Some families fled with Russian troops, however came back after the war was over.

=== War milestones ===
In the First and Second World Wars, the road through the village became the main way for the movement of troops between Kalush and Stryj. Limited number of men managed to enter the Legion of Ukrainian Sich Riflemen. A partial mobilization of the rest population to the Austrian troops also took place, and many of them were killed or taken prisoner. After the occupation of Galicia by Russian troops, the army headquarters were placed in the school, a field radio station was set up nearby. The Tsar's brother - Mikhail - served in the headquarters, he was a contact person on the issues of the looting by Russian soldiers. After the return of the Austro-Hungarian troops, full mobilization was carried out, including even those who returned from captivity. Mobilized troops were sent mostly on the Italian front, where in the fierce battles majority died.

On 1 November 1918 Ukrainians declared the creation of [their own state. The next day Polish troops started their aggression against it. Mostyshche residents went into the ranks of Ukrainian Galician Army, however they could not save the independence.

=== Polish occupation ===
After the West Ukrainian People's Republic was occupied by Polish troops, the peasants unified to defend their interests in Prosvita and Zlahoda cooperative. A dairy and creamery were opened, and a fire brigade was formed (for the work of the fire brigade a pump and other equipment was bought). The community also bought "Trier" grain cleaning machine, that was withdrawn by the Communists in 1950s for the collective farm. A summer kindergarten functioned in the village until 1939. In 1920s, a telephone line was established to Verkhnya village through the Mostyshche village. Since 1 of August 1934 Mostyshche was included into Verkhnya gmina (administrative unit in Poland). In 1920-1930s many Mostyshche residents worked on the construction of potash production in Kalush and bypass channel of Sivka river bypassing Kalush (between Mostyshche and Kalush). In 1938 the People's House was built by the community. Residents of the village covered the roof of the church with galvanized tin-plate, replaced the wooden crosses.

In 1939 there were 1600 residents in the village (1550 Ukrainians, 5 Poles, 30 residents of Latin rite (Poles and Ukrainians), 5 Jews, and 10 other nationalities).

=== Soviet and German occupation ===
In 1940 the USSR authorities built an airfield on the outskirts of the village (from that time this place is called the "Base"). The airfield was destroyed by German aviation on June 22, 1941.

In 1942 the community built a symbolic grave for the fighters for the freedom of Ukraine, which in 1950 was blown up by the NKVD.

Most of the village was burned down in 1945. On October 21, 1947, seven families were evicted to Siberia and Kazakhstan for the support of the Ukrainian movement, and their homes were destroyed. Even later on some Mostyshche residents were evicted to Siberia. In 1950s the USSR authorities identified the village as unpromising and forbidden to build new houses, demolished buildings and evicted residents from the separate parts of the village. The bridges and roads were not repaired.

By 1972, the village was subordinated to the Kalush City Council, between 1972 and 1991 - to the Kopanky village council.

=== Recently ===
In 1989 the gasification of the village was carried out, and the road was asphalted. A village council was formed in 1990.

In 1994 a new symbolic grave for the fighters for the freedom of Ukraine was erected. A monument to Taras Shevchenko was built in 1996 with public donations. Many efforts for this were made by its creator, the artist and a teacher Mykhailo Tymchyshyn.

In the village is buried Ukrainian soldier Yuri Pukish, who was killed August 29, 2015, near the city of Shchastia in Luhansk during the Russo-Ukrainian War.

== Church ==
For the first time the church of St. Nicholas is mentioned in 1684 with no indication of the date of construction.

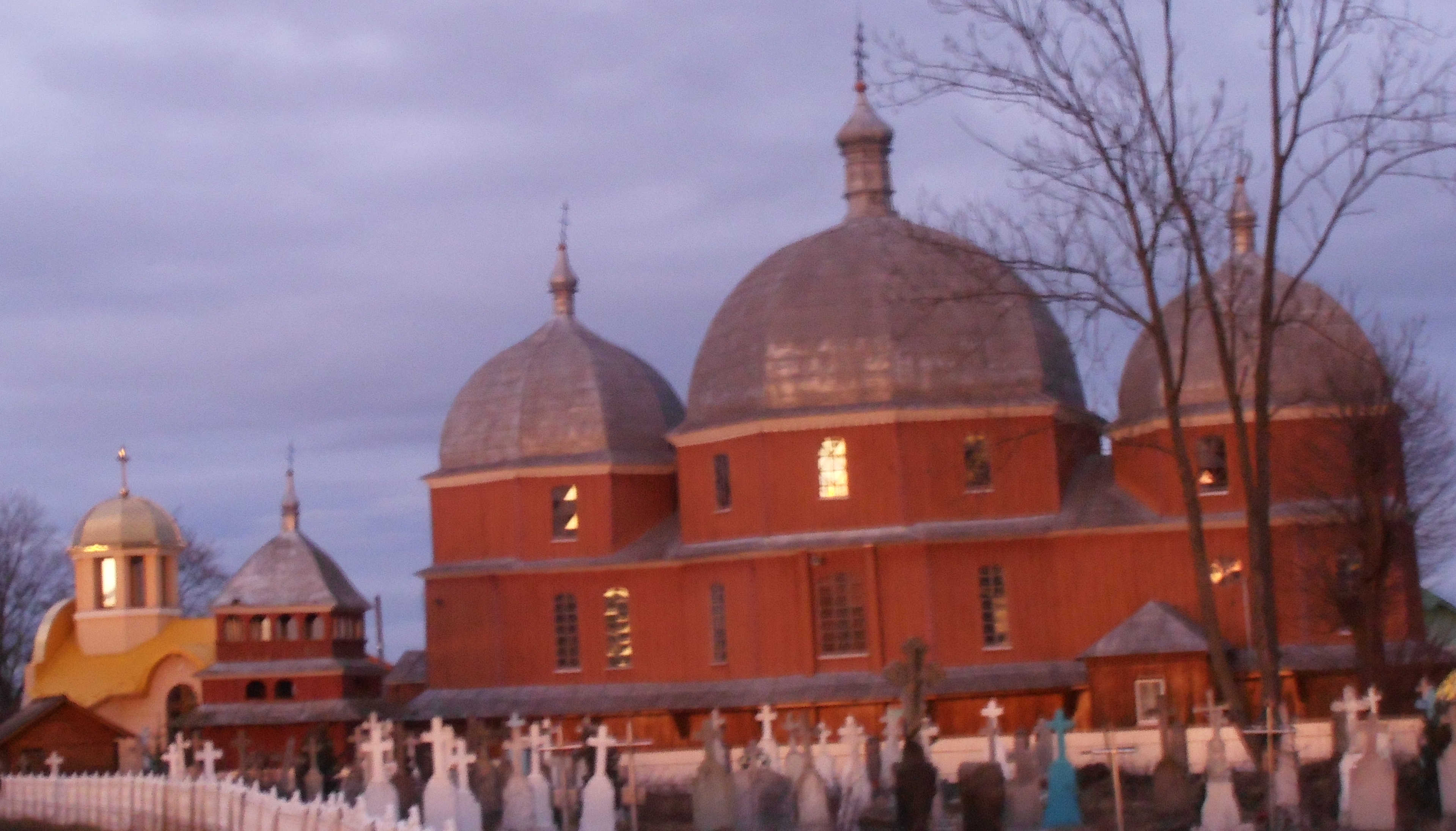
Church

In the minutes of Lviv and Halych-Kamianets' dioceses from 1740–1755 the Mostyshche church was described as a new wooden building, built by the local pastor in 1728 with the support of parishioners. The parish consisted of 36 parish house owners.

The new wooden church was built in 1870 with the efforts of the local pastor. The original paintings in the interior of the church were covered with new ones in the 1930s.

In 1914, there were five bells in the bell tower, which were taken away at the beginning of the war for remelting for military needs. In 1918, when the West Ukrainian People's Republic was proclaimed, the parishioners ordered 5 new bells in Kalush foundry of Fel'chynsky brothers. However, with the new war, the bells were again taken for military needs, only one savvy peasant replaced the biggest church bell with the school bell, hiding the church bell to return it after the war.

After the Ukrainian Greek Catholic Church was banned in 1946, the pastor Hnat Hunkevych was repressed, and the church was taken by the Russian Orthodox Church. However, with the weakening of the Communist regime pressure, the parish villagers at the general meeting in 1990 voted to return to the Ukrainian Greek Catholic Church. Now the church is a monument of local architecture № 775 in the use of the community of the Ukrainian Greek Catholic Church. Sixteenth and seventeenth-century books have been collected and preserved during the years of the community's existence.

== Leisure ==
In the village Mostyshche works the People's House, where there is a library and a museum. There is also a children's playground near the People's House, which was built in 2012. The youth of the village actively participates in the village life. At the People's House there are hobby groups. Namely the amateur folk choreographic collective "Malva", the vocal collective "Kalynon'ka" and the church choir. A bell tower near the church of St. Nicholas in the Mostyshche village was built in 2013. Temple feasts are on May 22 and December 19.

== Social sphere ==
- People's House
- School
- Paramedical and midwifery station
- 370 houses, 1025 residents.

== Streets ==
There are the following streets in the village:

Vasyl' Stus St.
Zelena St.
Ivan Franko St.
Lesya Ukrainka St.
Molodizhna St.
Robitnycha St.
Sahaydachnyy St.
Taras Shevchenko St.
Yuvileyna St.

== Personalities ==
- Klymyshyn, Mykola - an outstanding figure of Organization of Ukrainian Nationalists, participant of the Warsaw process
- Avdykovskyy, Orest Arsenovych - Ukrainian writer

== Photos ==
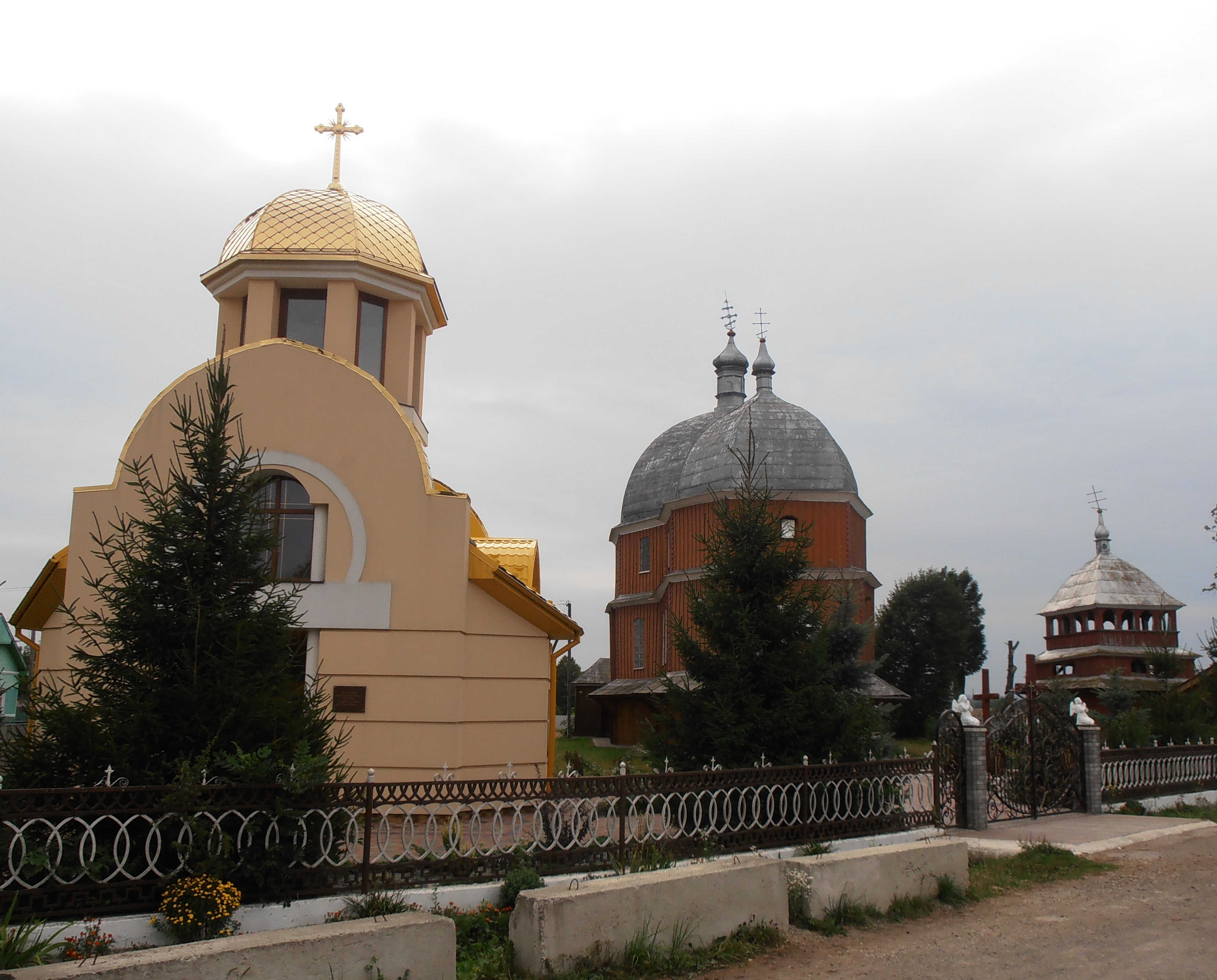

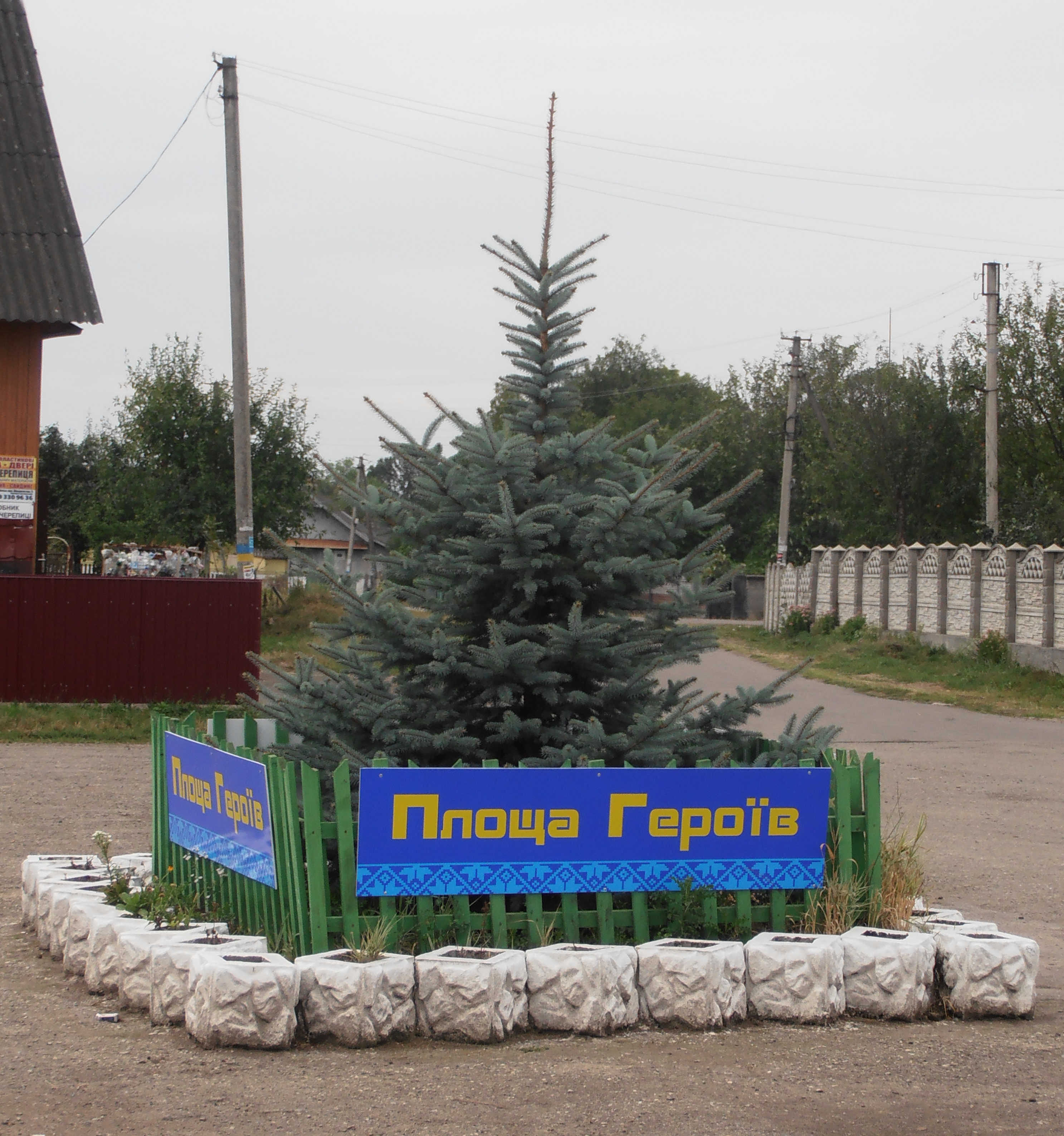

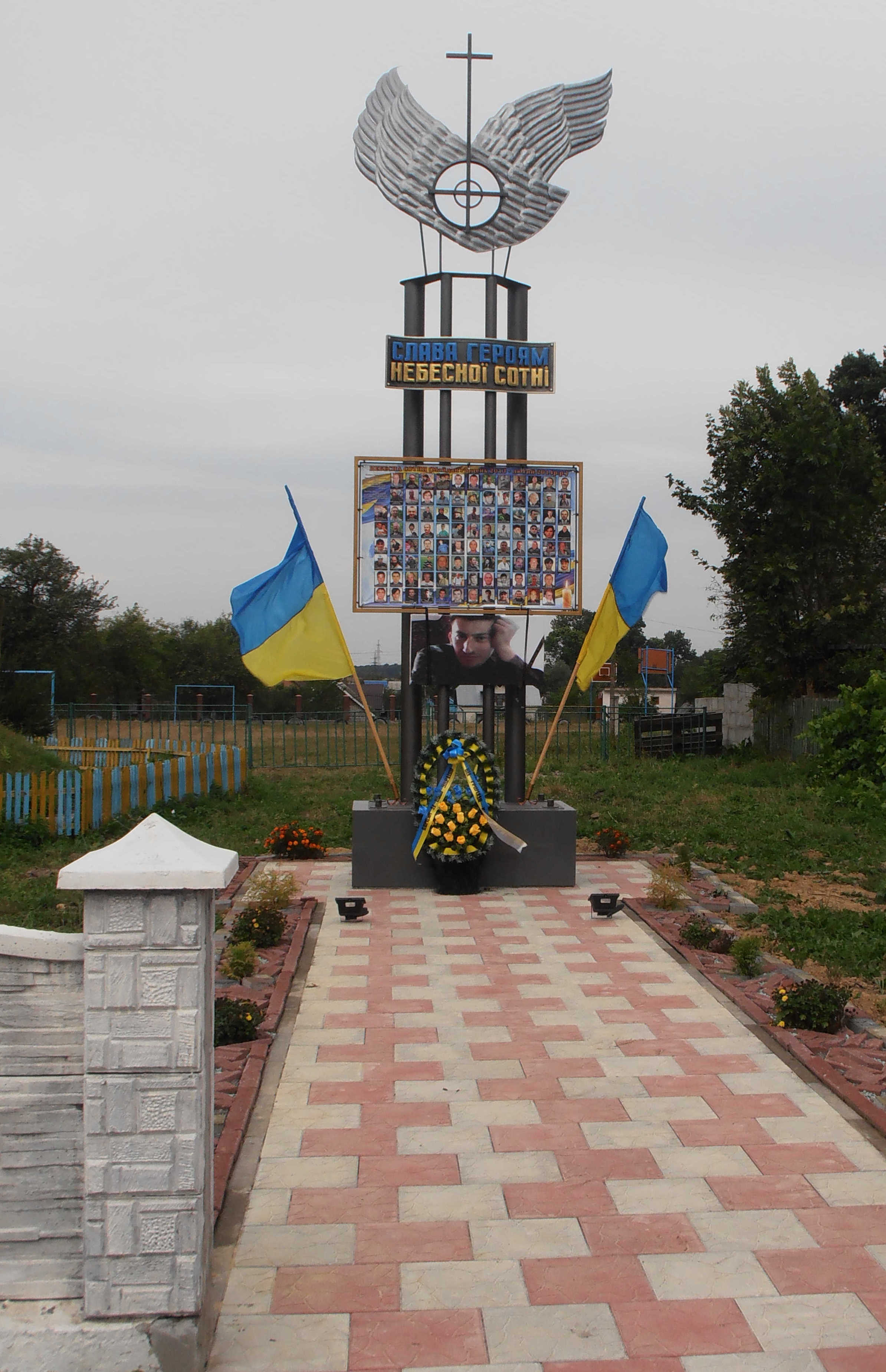

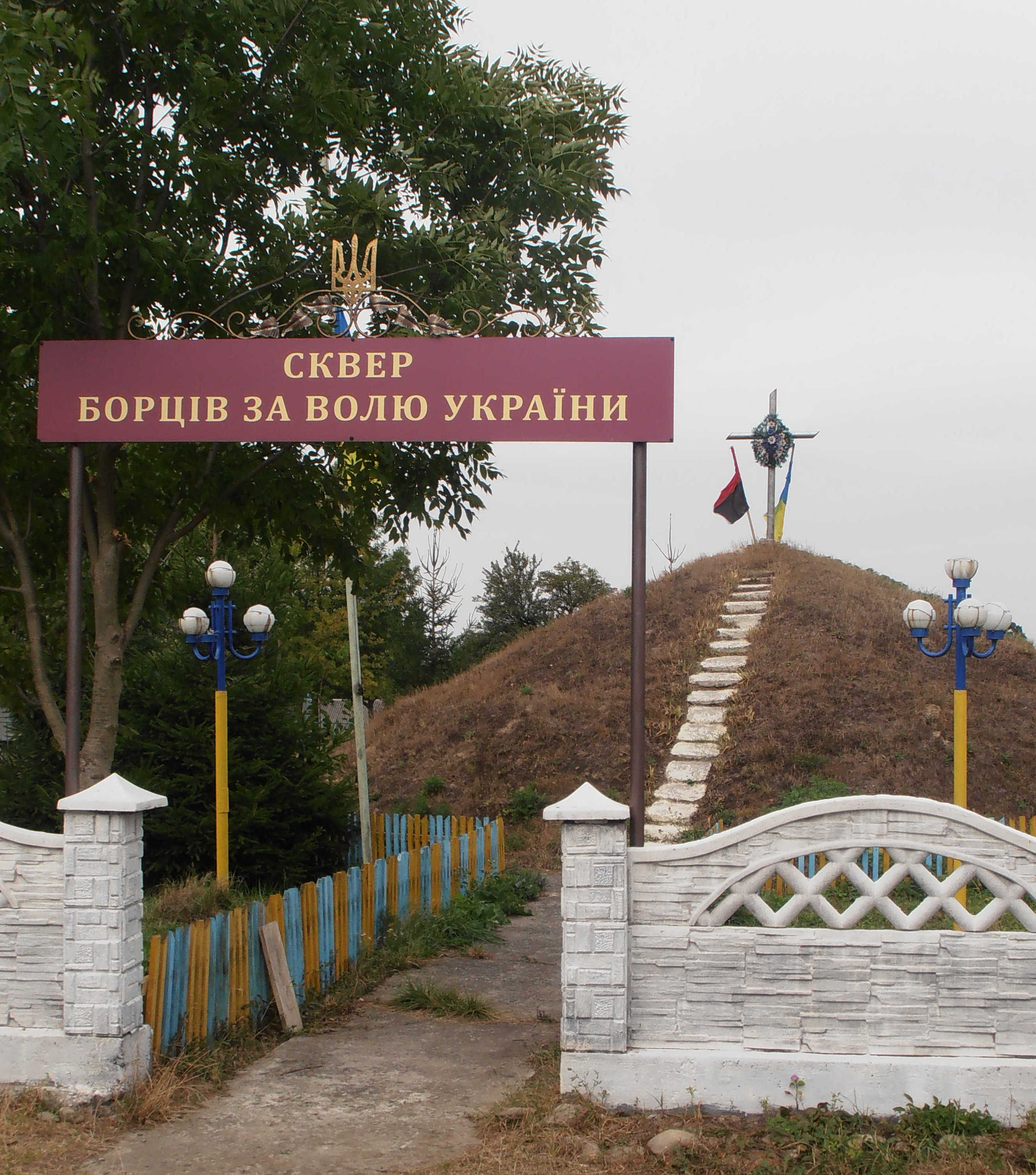

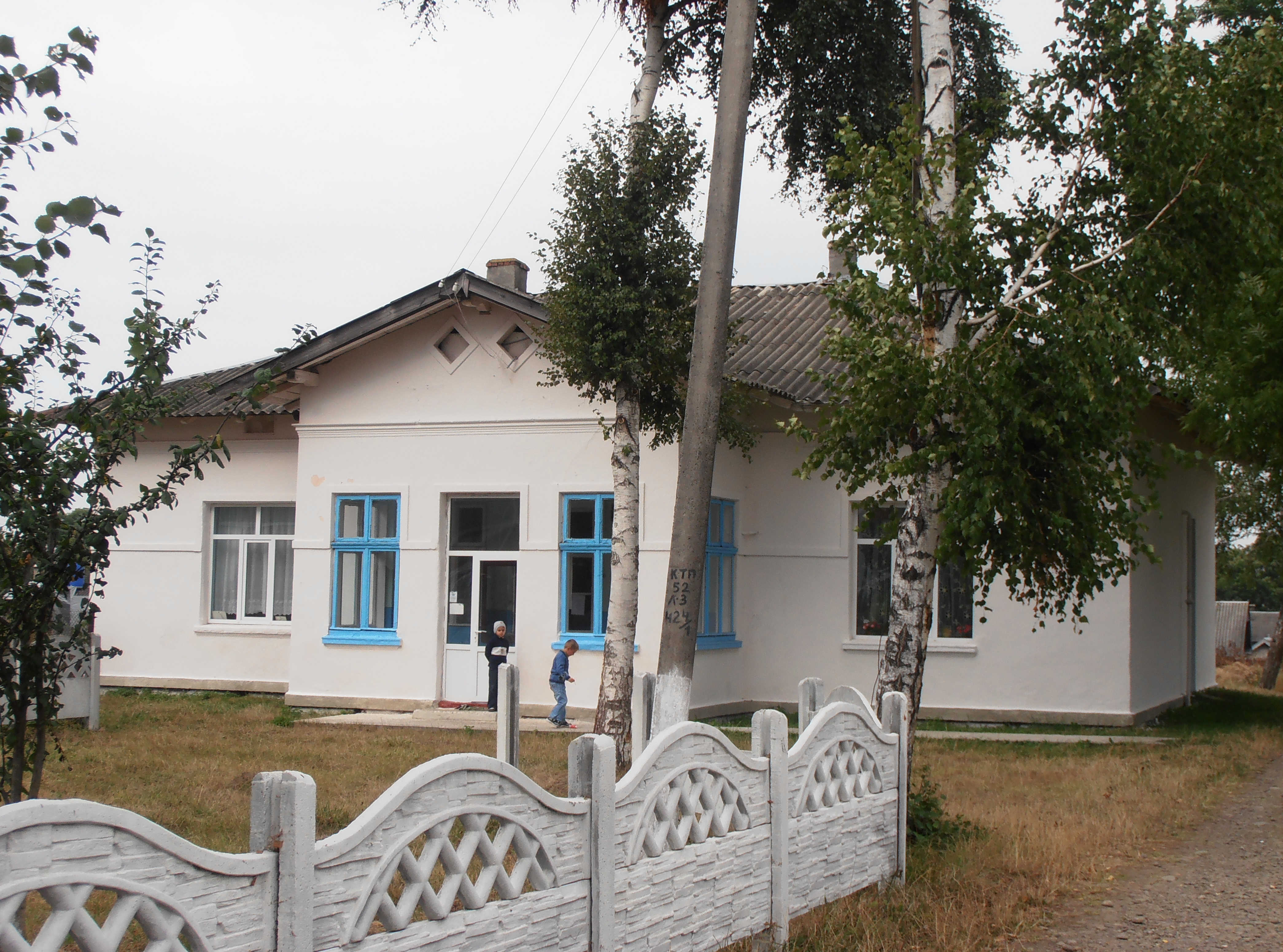

== Sources ==
- ненадрукована книга про село, автор — Дутка С.
- Mostyszczа // Słownik geograficzny Królestwa Polskiego i innych krajów słowiańskich. — Warszawa : Filip Sulimierski i Władysław Walewski, 1885. — T. VI : Malczyce — Netreba. (пол.).— S. 722. (пол.)
- Дутка С. Я. Нариси з історії села Мостище на Калущині. — Калуш: Петраш А.Т., 2015 — 176 с, іл.
