= Ion Antonescu =

Dictator of Romania from 1940 to 1944

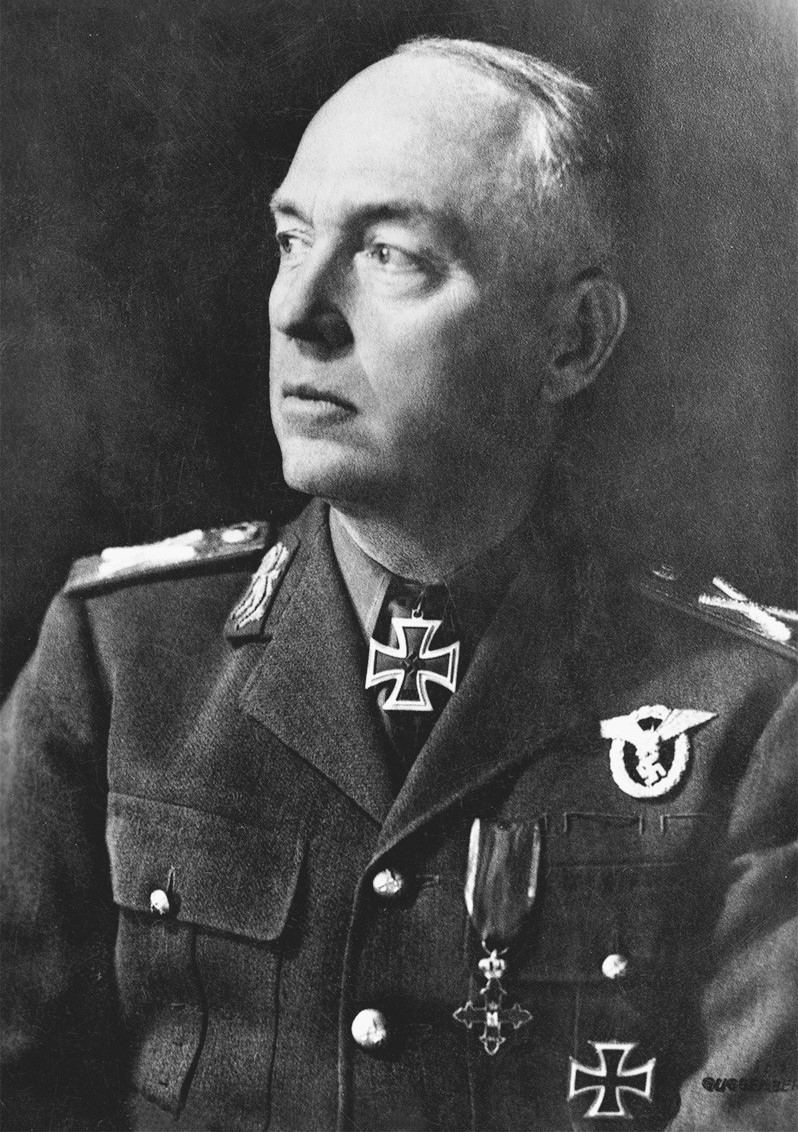
- Portrait, 1941

Conducător of Romania
- In office 6 September 1940 – 23 August 1944
- Preceded by: Position established
- Succeeded by: Position abolished

43rd Prime Minister of Romania
- In office 5 September 1940 – 23 August 1944
- Monarchs: Carol II; Michael I
- Deputy: Horia Sima (1940–1941); Mihai Antonescu (1941–1944)
- Preceded by: Ion Gigurtu
- Succeeded by: Constantin Sănătescu
Other positions
Minister of War
In office 22 September 1941 – 23 January 1942
Prime Minister	Himself
Preceded by	Iosif Iacobici
Succeeded by	Constantin Pantazi
In office 4 September 1940 – 27 January 1941
Prime Minister	Himself
Preceded by	Constantin Nicolescu
Succeeded by	Iosif Iacobici
In office 28 December 1937 – 31 March 1938
Prime Minister	Octavian Goga; Miron Cristea
Preceded by	Constantin Ilasievici
Succeeded by	Gheorghe Argeșanu
Minister of Culture and Religious Affairs
Acting; 11 November 1941 – 5 December 1941
Prime Minister	Himself
Preceded by	Radu R. Rosetti
Succeeded by	Ion Petrovici
Minister of Foreign Affairs
Acting; 27 January 1941 – 29 June 1941
Prime Minister	Himself
Preceded by	Mihail R. Sturdza
Succeeded by	Mihai Antonescu
Minister of Air Transport and Marine
Acting; 10 February 1938 – 30 March 1938
Prime Minister	Miron Cristea
Preceded by	Radu Irimescu
Succeeded by	Paul Teodorescu

Chief of the Romanian General Staff
- In office 1 December 1933 – 11 December 1934
- Monarch: Carol II
- Preceded by: Constantin Lăzărescu
- Succeeded by: Nicolae Samsonovici

Personal details
- Born: 14 June 1882 Pitești, Argeș County, Romania
- Died: 1 June 1946 (aged 63) Jilava Prison, Ilfov County, Romania
- Party: None^{[a]}
- Spouse: Maria Antonescu (m. 1927)
- Profession: Soldier
- Known for: Recapture of Bessarabia and Bukovina
- Nickname: Câinele Roșu ("The Red Dog")

Military service
- Allegiance: Kingdom of Romania
- Branch: Romanian Army
- Service years: 1904–1944
- Rank: Marshal of Romania
- Commands: Commander-in-chief of the Romanian Armed Forces
- Conflicts/battles: See list: 1907 Peasants' Revolt; Second Balkan War; Southern Dobruja Offensive; World War I; Moldavian Defensive; Battle of Mărășești; Hungarian-Romanian War; World War II; Legionary rebellion; Eastern Front; Operation Barbarossa; Operation München; Siege of Odessa; Jassy–Kishinev Operation
- Awards: See list: Military Virtue Medal; Order of Michael the Brave; Pilot/Observer Badge; Iron Cross; Knight's Cross of the Iron Cross; Order of the White Rose of Finland; Crimea Shield
- Criminal information
- Status: Executed by firing squad
- Convictions: War crimes Crimes against peace Crimes against humanity Treason
- Trial: Romanian People's Tribunals
- Penalty: Death

Details
- Victims: Romanian Jews; Ukrainian Jews; Romani people
- a. Formally allied with the Iron Guard (1940–41)

Ion Antonescu (/ˌæntəˈnɛskuː/; Romanian: [iˈon antoˈnesku]; 14 June [O.S. 2 June] 1882 – 1 June 1946) was a Romanian military officer and marshal who presided over two successive wartime dictatorships as Prime Minister and Conducător during most of World War II. Having been responsible for facilitating the Holocaust in Romania, he was overthrown in 1944, before being tried for war crimes and executed two years later in 1946.

A Romanian Army career officer who made his name during the 1907 peasants' revolt and the World War I Romanian campaign, the antisemitic Antonescu sympathised with far-right and fascist politics. He was a military attaché to France and later Chief of the General Staff, briefly serving as Defence Minister in the National Christian cabinet of Octavian Goga as well as the subsequent First Cristea cabinet, in which he also served as Air and Marine Minister. During the late 1930s, his political stance brought him into conflict with King Carol II and led to his detainment. Antonescu rose to political prominence during the political crisis of 1940, and established the National Legionary State, an uneasy partnership with Horia Sima of the Iron Guard. After entering Romania into an alliance with Nazi Germany, he eliminated the Guard following their Legionary Rebellion of 1941. In addition to being Prime Minister, he served as his own Foreign Minister and Defence Minister. Soon after Romania joined the Axis in Operation Barbarossa, recovering Bessarabia, Northern Bukovina and the Hertsa region, which had been occupied one year earlier by the Soviet Union, Antonescu also became Marshal of Romania.

An atypical figure among Holocaust perpetrators, Antonescu enforced policies independently responsible for the deaths of as many as 400,000 people, most of them Bessarabian, Ukrainian and Romanian Jews, as well as Romanian Romani. The regime's complicity in the Holocaust combined pogroms and mass murders such as the Odessa massacre with ethnic cleansing and systematic deportations to occupied Transnistria. The system in place was nevertheless characterized by singular inconsistencies, prioritizing plunder over killing, showing leniency toward most Jews in the Old Kingdom, and ultimately refusing to adopt the Final Solution. This was made possible by the fact that Romania, as an ally of Nazi Germany, was not occupied by the Wehrmacht and preserved a degree of political autonomy.

Aerial attacks on Romania by the Allies in 1944 and heavy casualties on the Eastern Front prompted Antonescu to open peace negotiations with the Allies, which were inconclusive. On 23 August 1944, King Michael I led a coup d'état against Antonescu, who was arrested; after the war he was convicted of war crimes, being executed in June 1946. His involvement in the Holocaust was officially reasserted and condemned following the 2003 Wiesel Commission report.

== Biography ==
=== Early life and career ===
Born in the town of Pitești, north-west of the capital Bucharest, Antonescu was the scion of an upper-middle class Romanian Orthodox family with some military tradition. He was especially close to his mother, Lița Baranga, who survived his death. His father, an army officer, wanted Ion to follow in his footsteps and thus sent him to attend the Infantry and Cavalry School in Craiova. During his childhood, his father divorced his mother to marry a woman who was a Jewish convert to Orthodoxy. The breakup of his parents' marriage was a traumatic event for the young Antonescu, and he made no secret of his dislike of his stepmother, whom he always depicted as a femme fatale who destroyed what he saw as his parents' happy marriage.

According to one account, Antonescu was briefly a classmate of Wilhelm Filderman, the future Romanian Jewish community activist whose interventions with Conducător Antonescu helped save a number of his coreligionists. After graduation, in 1904, Antonescu joined the Romanian Army with the rank of Second Lieutenant. He spent the following two years attending courses at the Special Cavalry Section in Târgoviște. Reportedly, Antonescu was a zealous and goal-setting student, upset by the slow pace of promotions, and compensated for his diminutive stature through toughness. In time, the reputation of being a tough and ruthless commander, together with his reddish hair, earned him the nickname Câinele Roșu ("The Red Dog"). Antonescu also developed a reputation for questioning his commanders and for appealing over their heads whenever he felt they were wrong.

During the repression of the 1907 peasants' revolt, he headed a cavalry unit in Covurlui County. Opinions on his role in the events diverge: while some historians believe Antonescu was a particularly violent participant in quelling the revolt, others equate his participation with that of regular officers or view it as outstandingly tactful. In addition to restricting peasant protests, Antonescu's unit subdued socialist activities in Galați port. His handling of the situation earned him praise from King Carol I, who sent Crown Prince (future monarch) Ferdinand to congratulate him in front of the whole garrison. The following year, Antonescu was promoted to Lieutenant, and, between 1911 and 1913, he attended the Advanced War School, receiving the rank of Captain upon graduation. In 1913, during the Second Balkan War against Bulgaria, Antonescu served as a staff officer in the First Cavalry Division in Dobruja.

=== World War I ===
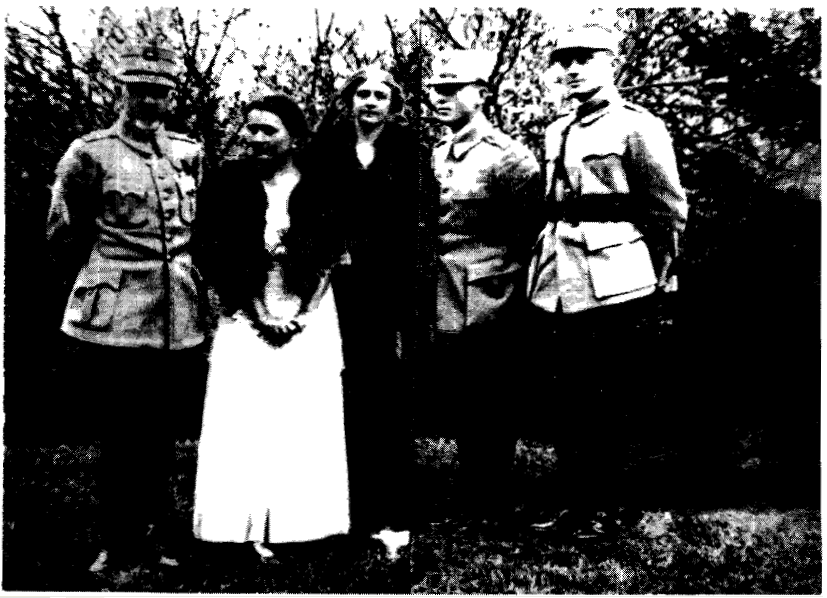
Major Ion Antonescu (second from the right) with General Constantin Prezan and his wife Olga Prezan (first and second from the left, respectively), 1916

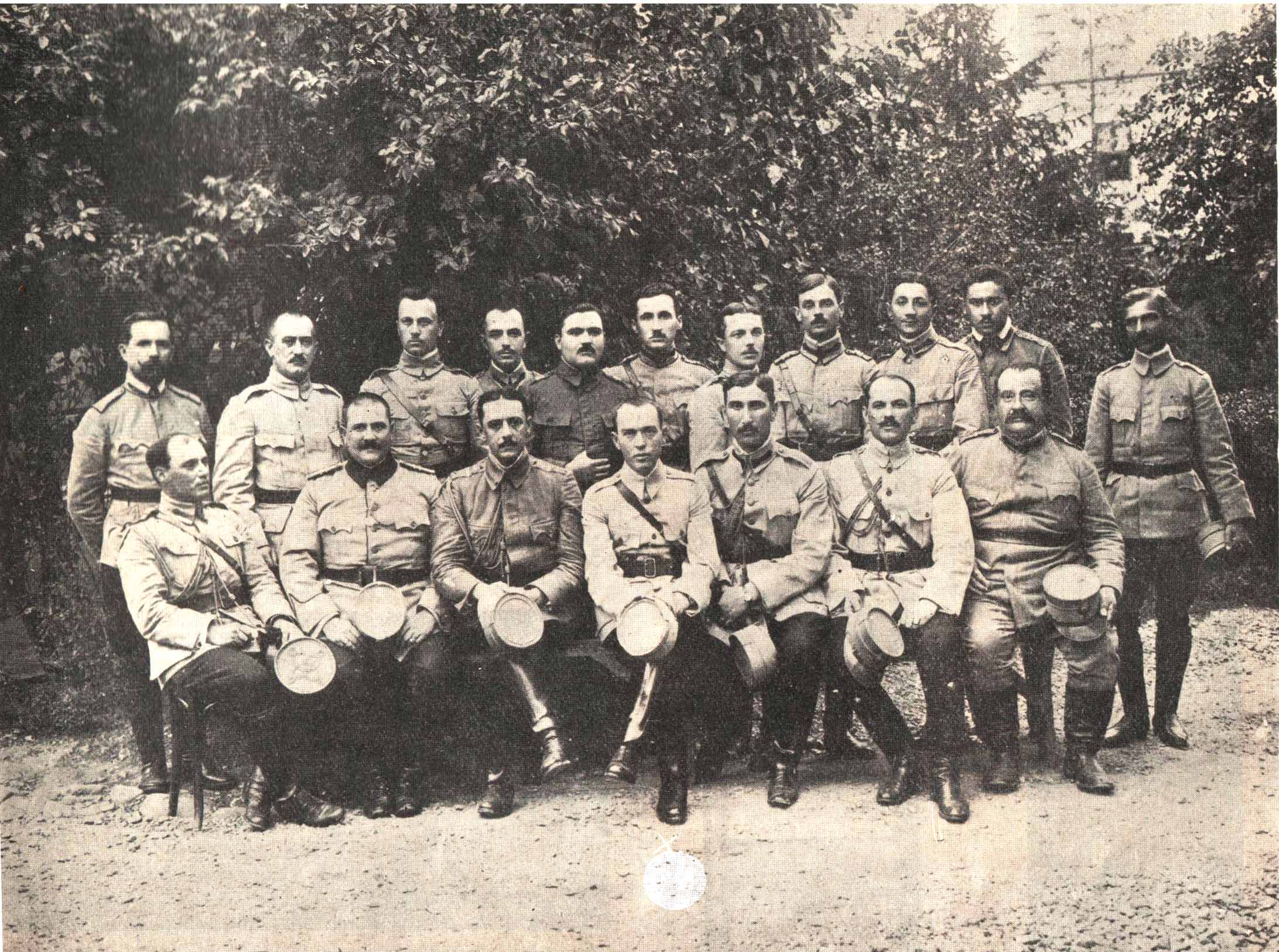
Antonescu (bottom row, centre) with the other officers of the Section "Operations" of the wartime General Staff (Marele Cartier General), end of March 1918

After 1916, when Romania entered World War I on the Allied side, Ion Antonescu acted as chief of staff for General Constantin Prezan. When enemy troops crossed the mountains from Transylvania into Wallachia, Antonescu was ordered to design a defence plan for Bucharest.

The Romanian royal court, army, and administration were subsequently forced to retreat into Moldavia. Antonescu took part in an important decision involving defensive efforts, an unusual promotion which probably stoked his ambitions. In December, as Prezan became the Chief of the General Staff, Antonescu, who was by now a major, was named the head of operations, being involved in the defence of Moldavia. He contributed to the tactics used during the Battle of Mărășești (July–August 1917), when Romanians under General Eremia Grigorescu managed to stop the advance of German forces under the command of Field Marshal August von Mackensen. Being described as "a talented if prickly individual", Antonescu lived in Prezan's proximity for the remainder of the war and influenced his decisions. Such was the influence of Antonescu on General Prezan that General Alexandru Averescu used the formula "Prezan (Antonescu)" in his memoirs to denote Prezan's plans and actions.

That autumn, Romania's main ally, the Russian Provisional Government, left the conflict. Its successor, Bolshevik Russia, made peace with the Central Powers, leaving Romania the only enemy of the Central Powers on the Eastern Front. In these conditions, the Romanian government made its own peace treaty with the Central Powers. Romania broke the treaty later in the year, on the grounds that King Ferdinand I had not signed it. During the interval, Antonescu, who viewed the separate peace as "the most rational solution," was assigned command over a cavalry regiment. The renewed offensive played a part in ensuring the union of Transylvania with Romania. After the war, Antonescu's merits as an operations officer were noticed by, among others, politician Ion G. Duca, who wrote that "his [Antonescu's] intelligence, skill and activity, brought credit on himself and invaluable service to the country." Another event occurring late in the war is also credited with having played a major part in Antonescu's life: in 1918, Crown Prince Carol (the future King Carol II) left his army posting to marry a commoner. This outraged Antonescu, who developed enduring contempt for the future king.

=== Diplomatic assignments and General Staff positions ===
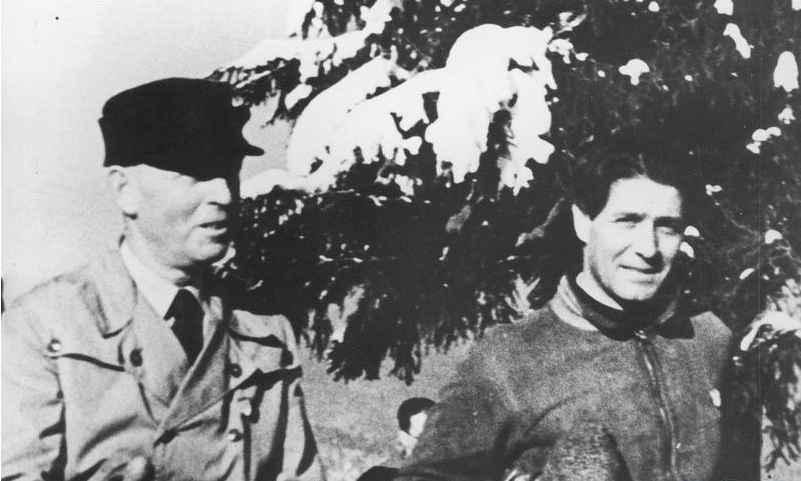
General Antonescu (left) with Corneliu Zelea Codreanu, Căpitan of the Iron Guard, at a skiing event in 1935

Lieutenant Colonel Ion Antonescu retained his visibility in the public eye during the interwar period. He participated in the political campaign to earn recognition at the Paris Peace Conference of 1919 for Romania's gains in Transylvania. His nationalist argument about a future state was published as the essay Românii. Origina, trecutul, sacrificiile și drepturile lor ("The Romanians. Their Origin, Their Past, Their Sacrifices and Their Rights"). The booklet advocated extension of Romanian rule beyond the confines of Greater Romania, and recommended, at the risk of war with the emerging Kingdom of Yugoslavia, the annexation of all Banat areas and the Timok Valley. Antonescu was known for his frequent and erratic changes of mood, going from being extremely angry to being calm to angry again to being calm again within minutes, behaviour that often disoriented those who had to work with him. The Israeli historian Jean Ancel wrote that Antonescu's frequent changes of mood were due to the syphilis he contracted as a young man, a condition he suffered from for the rest of his life.

He became military attaché in Paris in 1922. He negotiated 100 million French francs worth of credit in order to purchase French weaponry. He worked together with Romanian diplomat Nicolae Titulescu; the two became personal friends. He was also in contact with the Romanian-born conservative aristocrat and writer Marthe Bibesco, who introduced Antonescu to the ideas of Gustave Le Bon, a researcher of crowd psychology who had an influence on Fascism. Bibesco saw Antonescu as a new version of 19th century nationalist Frenchman Georges Boulanger, introducing him as such to Le Bon. In 1923, he made the acquaintance of lawyer Mihai Antonescu, who was to become his close friend, legal representative and political associate.

After returning to Romania in 1926, Antonescu resumed his teaching in Sibiu, and, in the autumn of 1928, became Secretary-General of the Defence Ministry in the Vintilă Brătianu cabinet. He married Maria Niculescu, for long a resident of France, who had been married twice before: first to a Romanian Police officer, with whom she had a son, Gheorghe (died 1944), and then to a Frenchman of Jewish origin. After a period as Deputy Chief of the General Staff, he was appointed its Chief (1933–1934). These assignments coincided with the rule of Carol's underage son Michael I and his regents, and with Carol's seizure of power in 1930. During this period Antonescu first grew interested in the Iron Guard, an antisemitic and fascist-related movement headed by Corneliu Zelea Codreanu. In his capacity as Deputy Chief of Staff, he ordered the Army's intelligence unit to compile a report on the faction, and made a series of critical notes on Codreanu's various statements.

As Chief of Staff, Antonescu reportedly had his first confrontation with the political class and the monarch. His projects for weapon modernization were questioned by defence minister Paul Angelescu, leading Antonescu to present his resignation. According to another account, he completed an official report on the embezzlement of Army funds which indirectly implicated Carol and his camarilla. The king consequently ordered him out of office, provoking indignation among sections of the political mainstream. On Carol's orders, Antonescu was placed under surveillance by the Siguranța Statului intelligence service, and closely monitored by the Interior Ministry Undersecretary Armand Călinescu. The officer's political credentials were on the rise, as he was able to establish and maintain contacts with people on all sides of the political spectrum, while support for Carol plummeted. Among these were contacts with the two main democratic groups, the National Liberal and the National Peasants', parties known respectively as PNL and PNȚ. He was also engaged in discussions with the rising far right, antisemitic and fascist movements; although in competition with each other, both the National Christian Party (PNC) of Octavian Goga and the Iron Guard sought to attract Antonescu to their side. In 1936, to the authorities' alarm, Army General and Iron Guard member Gheorghe Cantacuzino-Grănicerul arranged a meeting between Antonescu and the movement's leader, Corneliu Codreanu. Antonescu is reported to have found Codreanu arrogant, but to have welcomed his revolutionizing approach to politics.

=== Defence portfolio and the Codreanu trials ===
In late 1937, after the December general election came to an inconclusive result, Carol appointed Goga Prime Minister over a far right cabinet that was the first executive to impose racial discrimination in its treatment of the Jewish community. Goga's appointment was meant to curb the rise of the more popular and even more radical Codreanu. Initially given the Communications portfolio by his rival, Interior Minister Armand Călinescu, Antonescu repeatedly demanded the office of Defence Minister, which he was eventually granted. His mandate coincided with a troubled period, and saw Romania having to choose between its traditional alliance with France, Britain, the crumbling Little Entente and the League of Nations or moving closer to Nazi Germany and its Anti-Comintern Pact. Antonescu's own contribution is disputed by historians, who variously see him as either a supporter of the Anglo-French alliance or, like the PNC itself, more favourable to cooperation with Adolf Hitler's Germany. At the time, Antonescu viewed Romania's alliance with the Entente as insurance against Hungarian and Soviet revanchism, but, as an anti-communist, he was suspicious of the Franco-Soviet rapprochement. Particularly concerned about Hungarian demands in Transylvania, he ordered the General Staff to prepare for a western attack. However, his major contribution in office was in relation to an internal crisis: as a response to violent clashes between the Iron Guard and the PNC's own fascist militia, the Lăncieri, Antonescu extended the already imposed martial law.

The Goga cabinet ended when the tentative rapprochement between Goga and Codreanu prompted Carol to overthrow the democratic system and proclaim his own authoritarian regime. The deposed Premier died in 1938, while Antonescu remained a close friend of his widow, Veturia Goga. By that time, revising his earlier stance, Antonescu had also built a close relationship with Codreanu, and was even said to have become his confidant. On Carol's request, he had earlier asked the Guard's leader to consider an alliance with the king, which Codreanu promptly refused in favour of negotiations with Goga, coupled with claims that he was not interested in political battles, an attitude supposedly induced by Antonescu himself.

Soon afterward, Călinescu, acting on indications from the monarch, arrested Codreanu and prosecuted him in two successive trials. Antonescu, whose mandate of Defence Minister had been prolonged under the premiership of Miron Cristea, resigned in protest of Codreanu's arrest. Antonescu's mandate ended on 30 March 1938. He also served as Air and Marine Minister between 2 February and his resignation on 30 March. He was a celebrity defence witness at Codreanu's first and second trials. During the latter trial, which resulted in Codreanu's conviction for treason, Antonescu vouched for his friend's honesty while shaking his hand in front of the jury. Upon the conclusion of the trial, the king ordered his former minister interned at Predeal, before assigning him to command the Third Army in the remote eastern region of Bessarabia (and later removing him after Antonescu expressed sympathy for Guardists imprisoned in Chișinău). Attempting to discredit his rival, Carol also ordered Antonescu's wife to be tried for bigamy, based on a false claim that her divorce had not been finalised. Defended by Mihai Antonescu, the officer was able to prove his detractors wrong. Codreanu himself was taken into custody and discreetly killed by the Gendarmes acting on Carol's orders (November 1938).

Carol's regime slowly dissolved into crisis, a dissolution accelerated after the start of World War II, when the military success of the core Axis powers and the non-aggression pact signed by Germany and the Soviet Union saw Romania isolated and threatened. In 1940, two of Romania's regions, Bessarabia and Northern Bukovina, were lost to a Soviet occupation consented to by the king. This came as Romania, exposed by the Fall of France, was seeking to align its policies with those of Germany. Antonescu himself had come to value a pro-Axis alternative after the 1938 Munich Agreement, when Germany imposed demands on Czechoslovakia with the acquiescence of France and the United Kingdom, leaving locals to fear that, unless reoriented, Romania would follow. Angered by the territorial losses of 1940, General Antonescu sent Carol a general note of protest, and, as a result, was arrested and interned at Bistrița Monastery. While there, he commissioned Mihai Antonescu to establish contacts with Nazi German officials, promising to advance German economic interest, particularly in respect to the local oil industry, in exchange for endorsement. Commenting on Antonescu's ambivalent stance, Hitler's minister to Romania, Wilhelm Fabricius, wrote to his superiors: "I am not convinced that he is a safe man."

=== Rise to power ===
Banner of Ion Antonescu as Conducător

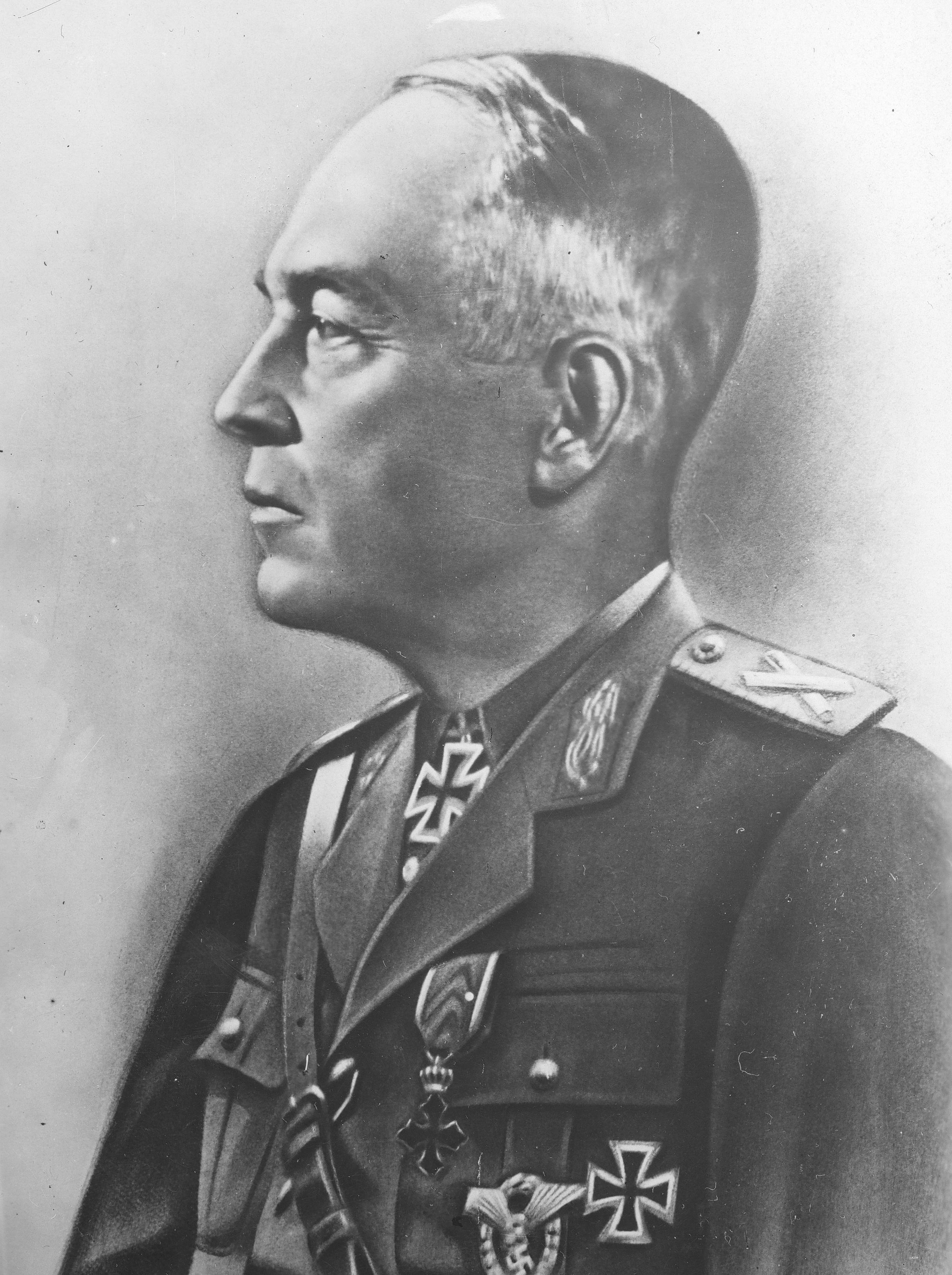
Antonescu's official portrait, 1942

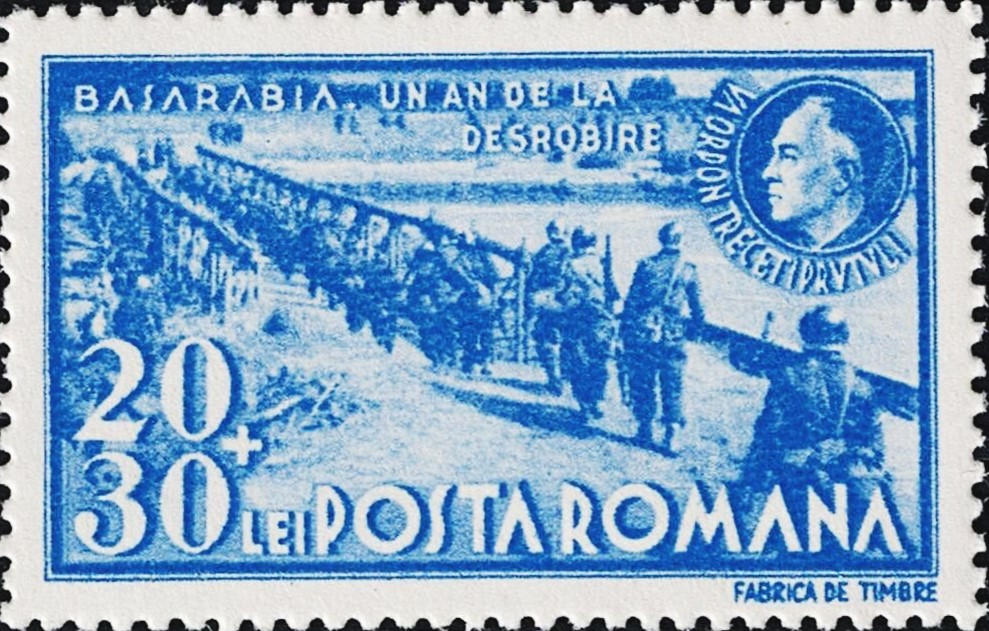
1942 post stamp featuring Antonescu

Romania's elite had been intensely Francophile ever since Romania had won its independence in the 19th century, indeed so Francophile that the defeat of France in June 1940 had the effect of discrediting the entire elite. Antonescu's internment ended in August, during which interval, under Axis pressure, Romania had ceded Southern Dobruja to Bulgaria (see Treaty of Craiova) and Northern Transylvania to Hungary. The latter grant caused consternation among large sections of Romania's population, causing Carol's popularity to fall to a record low and provoking large-scale protests in Bucharest, the capital. These movements were organised competitively by the pro-Allied PNȚ, headed by Iuliu Maniu, and the pro-Nazi Iron Guard. The latter group had been revived under the leadership of Horia Sima, and was organizing a coup d'état. In this troubled context, Antonescu simply left his assigned residence. He may have been secretly helped in this by German intercession, but was more directly aided to escape by socialite Alice Sturdza, who was acting on Maniu's request. Antonescu subsequently met with Maniu in Ploiești, where they discussed how best to manage the political situation. While these negotiations were carried out, the monarch himself was being advised by his entourage to recover legitimacy by governing in tandem with the increasingly popular Antonescu, while creating a new political majority from the existing forces.

On 2 September 1940, Valer Pop, a courtier and an important member of the camarilla, first advised Carol to appoint Antonescu as Prime Minister as the solution to the crisis. Pop's reasons for advising Carol to appoint Antonescu as Prime Minister were partly because Antonescu, who was known to be friendly with the Iron Guard and who had been imprisoned under Carol, was believed to have enough of an oppositional background to Carol's regime to appease the public and partly because Pop knew that Antonescu, for all his Legionary sympathies, was a member of the elite and believed he would never turn against it. When Carol proved reluctant to make Antonescu Prime Minister, Pop visited the German legation to meet with Fabricius on the night of 4 September 1940 to ask that the German minister phone Carol to tell him that the Reich wanted Antonescu as Prime Minister, and Fabricius promptly did just that. Carol and Antonescu accepted the proposal, Antonescu being ordered to approach political party leaders Maniu of the PNȚ and Dinu Brătianu of the PNL. They all called for Carol's abdication as a preliminary measure, while Sima, another leader sought after for negotiations, could not be found in time to express his opinion. Antonescu partly complied with the request but also asked Carol to bestow upon him the reserve powers for Romanian heads of state. Carol yielded and, on 5 September 1940, the general became Prime Minister, and Carol transferred most of his dictatorial powers to him. The latter's first measure was to curtail potential resistance within the Army by relieving Bucharest Garrison chief Gheorghe Argeșanu of his position and replacing him with Dumitru Coroamă. Shortly afterward, Antonescu heard rumours that two of Carol's loyalist generals, Gheorghe Mihail and Paul Teodorescu, were planning to have him killed. In reaction, he forced Carol to abdicate, while General Coroamă was refusing to carry out the royal order of shooting down Iron Guardist protesters.

Michael ascended the throne for the second time, while Antonescu's dictatorial powers were confirmed and extended. On 6 September, the day Michael formally assumed the throne, he issued a royal decree declaring Antonescu Conducător (leader) of the state. The same decree relegated the monarch to a ceremonial role. Among Antonescu's subsequent measures was ensuring the safe departure into self-exile of Carol and his mistress Elena Lupescu, granting protection to the royal train when it was attacked by armed members of the Iron Guard. The regime of King Carol had been notorious for being the most corrupt regime in Europe during the 1930s, and when Carol fled Romania, he took with him the better part of the Romanian treasury, leaving the new government with enormous financial problems. Antonescu had expected, perhaps naïvely, that Carol would take with him enough money to provide for a comfortable exile, and was surprised that Carol had cleared out almost the entire national treasury. For the next four years, a major concern of Antonescu's government was attempting to have the Swiss banks where Carol had deposited the assets return the money to Romania; this effort did not meet with success.

Horia Sima's subsequent cooperation with Antonescu was endorsed by high-ranking Nazi German officials, many of whom feared the Iron Guard was too weak to rule on its own. Antonescu therefore received the approval of Ambassador Fabricius. Despite early promises, Antonescu abandoned projects for the creation of a national government, and opted instead for a coalition between a military dictatorship lobby and the Iron Guard. He later justified his choice by stating that the Iron Guard "represented the political base of the country at the time." Right from the outset, Antonescu clashed with Sima over economic questions, with Antonescu's main concern being to get the economy growing so as to provide taxes for a treasury looted by Carol, while Sima favoured populist economic measures that Antonescu insisted there was no money for.

=== Antonescu-Sima partnership ===
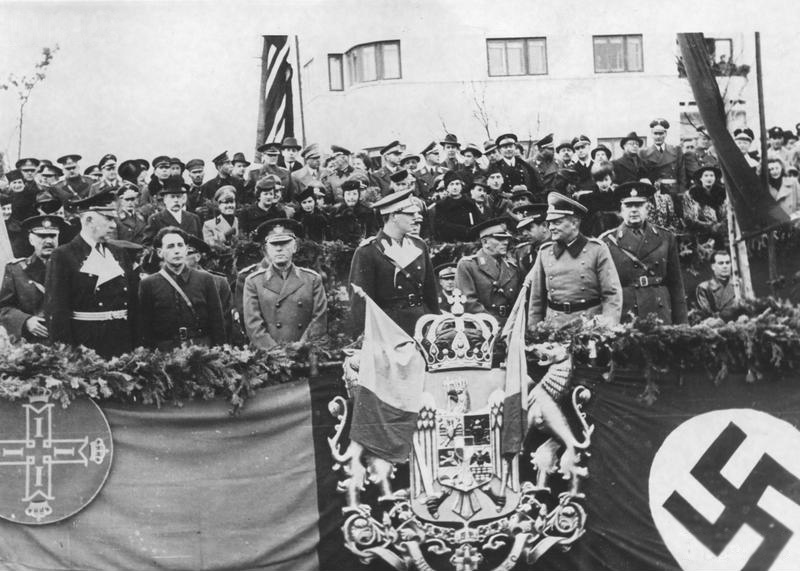
Horia Sima, Antonescu and King Michael I of Romania, 1940

The resulting regime, deemed the National Legionary State, was officially proclaimed on 14 September. On that date, the Iron Guard was remodelled into the only legally permitted party in Romania. Antonescu continued as Premier and Conducător, and was named as the Guard's honorary commander. Sima became Deputy Premier and leader of the Guard. Antonescu subsequently ordered the Guardists imprisoned by Carol to be set free. On 6 October, he presided over the Iron Guard's mass rally in Bucharest, one in a series of major celebratory and commemorative events organised by the movement during the late months of 1940. However, he tolerated the PNȚ and PNL's informal existence, allowing them to preserve much of their political support.

There followed a short-lived and always uneasy partnership between Antonescu and Sima. In late September, the new regime denounced all pacts, accords and diplomatic agreements signed under Carol, bringing the country into Germany's orbit while subverting its relationship with a former Balkan ally, the Kingdom of Yugoslavia. Germans troops entered the country in stages, in order to defend the local oil industry and help instruct their Romanian counterparts on Blitzkrieg tactics. On 23 November, Antonescu was in Berlin, where his signature sealed Romania's commitment to the main Axis instrument, the Tripartite Pact. Two days later, the country also adhered to the Nazi-led Anti-Comintern Pact. Other than these generic commitments, Romania had no treaty binding it to Germany, and the Romanian-German alliance functioned informally. Speaking in 1946, Antonescu claimed to have followed the pro-German path in continuation of earlier policies, and for fear of a Nazi protectorate in Romania.

During the National Legionary State period, earlier antisemitic legislation was upheld and strengthened, while the "Romanianization" of Jewish-owned enterprises became standard official practice. Immediately after coming into office, Antonescu himself expanded the anti-Jewish and Nuremberg law-inspired legislation passed by his predecessors Goga and Ion Gigurtu, while tens of new anti-Jewish regulations were passed in 1941–1942. This was done despite his formal pledge to Wilhelm Filderman and the Jewish Communities Federation that, unless engaged in "sabotage," "the Jewish population will not suffer." Antonescu did not reject the application of Legionary policies, but was offended by Sima's advocacy of paramilitarism and the Guard's frequent recourse to street violence. He drew much hostility from his partners by extending some protection to former dignitaries whom the Iron Guard had arrested. One early incident opposed Antonescu to the Guard's newspaper Buna Vestire, which accused him of leniency and was subsequently forced to change its editorial board. By then, the Legionary press was routinely claiming that he was obstructing revolution and aiming to take control of the Iron Guard, and that he had been transformed into a tool of Freemasonry. The political conflict coincided with major social challenges, including the influx of refugees from areas lost earlier in the year and a large-scale earthquake affecting Bucharest.

Disorder peaked in the last days of November 1940, when, after uncovering the circumstances of Codreanu's death, the fascist movement ordered retaliations against political figures previously associated with Carol, carrying out the Jilava Massacre, the assassinations of Nicolae Iorga and Virgil Madgearu, and several other acts of violence. As retaliation for this insubordination, Antonescu ordered the Army to resume control of the streets, unsuccessfully pressured Sima to have the assassins detained, ousted the Iron Guardist prefect of Bucharest Police Ștefan Zăvoianu, and ordered Legionary ministers to swear an oath to the Conducător. His condemnation of the killings was nevertheless limited and discreet, and, the same month, he joined Sima at a burial ceremony for Codreanu's newly discovered remains. The widening gap between the dictator and Sima's party resonated in Berlin. When, in December, Legionary Foreign Minister Mihail R. Sturdza obtained the replacement of Fabricius with Manfred Freiherr von Killinger, perceived as more sympathetic to the Iron Guard, Antonescu promptly took over leadership of the ministry, with the compliant diplomat Constantin Greceanu as his right hand. In Germany, such leaders of the Nazi Party as Heinrich Himmler, Baldur von Schirach and Joseph Goebbels threw their support behind the Legionaries, whereas Foreign Minister Joachim von Ribbentrop and the Wehrmacht stood by Antonescu. The latter group was concerned that any internal conflict would threaten Romania's oil industry, vital to the German war effort. The German leadership was by then secretly organizing Operation Barbarossa, the attack on the Soviet Union.

=== Legionary Rebellion and Operation Barbarossa ===
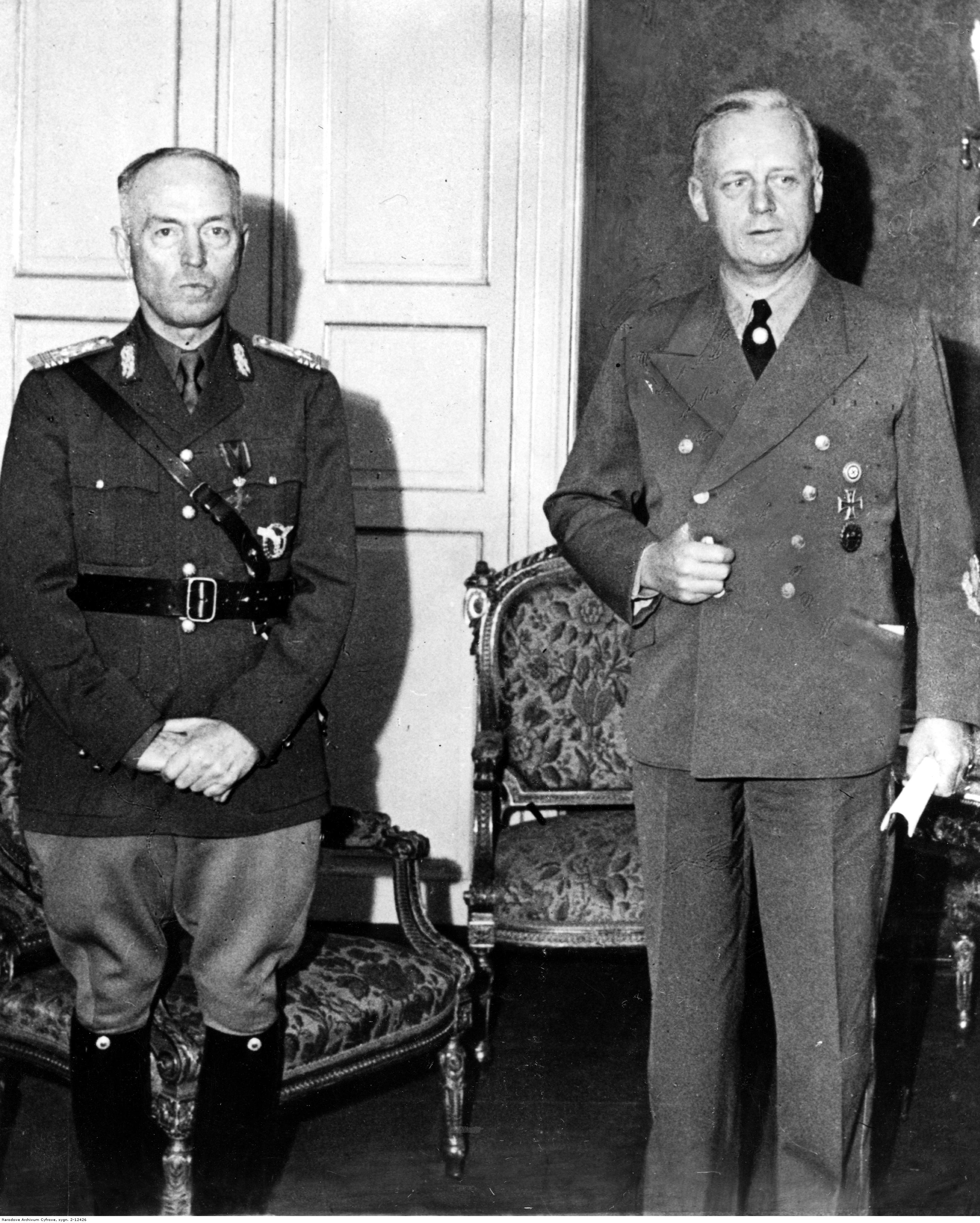
Antonescu with German foreign minister Joachim von Ribbentrop in June 1941

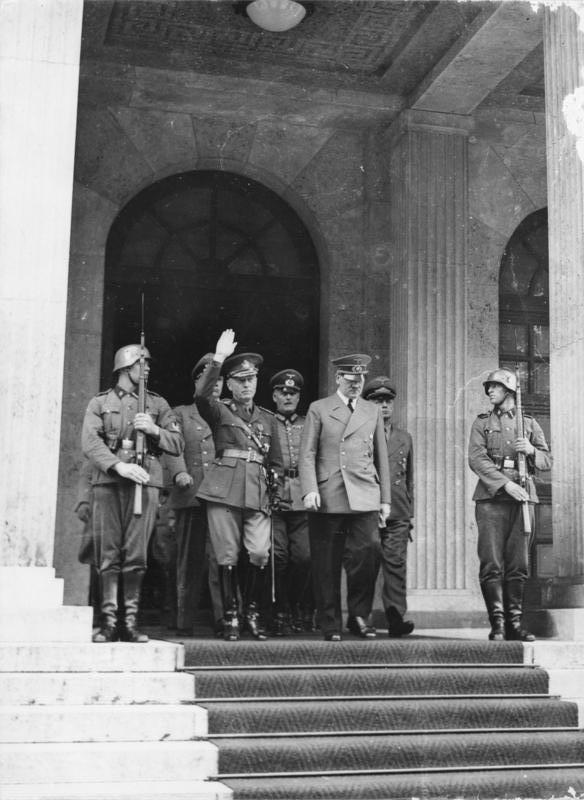
Antonescu and Adolf Hitler at the Führerbau in Munich (June 1941). Joachim von Ribbentrop and Generalfeldmarschall Wilhelm Keitel in the background

Antonescu's plan to act against his coalition partners in the event of further disorder hinged on Hitler's approval, a vague signal of which had been given during ceremonies confirming Romania's adherence to the Tripartite Pact. A decisive turn occurred when Hitler invited Antonescu and Sima both over for discussions: whereas Antonescu agreed, Sima stayed behind in Romania, probably plotting a coup d'état. While Hitler did not produce a clear endorsement for clamping down on Sima's party, he made remarks interpreted by their recipient as oblique blessings. On 14 January 1941 during a German-Romanian summit, Hitler informed Antonescu of his plans to invade the Soviet Union later that year and asked Romania to participate. By this time, Hitler had come to the conclusion that while Sima was ideologically closer to him, Antonescu was the more competent leader capable of ensuring stability in Romania while being committed to aligning his country with the Axis.

The Antonescu-Sima dispute erupted into violence in January 1941, when the Iron Guard instigated a series of attacks on public institutions and a pogrom, incidents collectively known as the "Legionary Rebellion." This came after the mysterious assassination of Major Döring, a German agent in Bucharest, which was used by the Iron Guard as a pretext to accuse the Conducător of having a secret anti-German agenda, and made Antonescu oust the Legionary Interior Minister, Constantin Petrovicescu, while closing down all of the Legionary-controlled "Romanianization" offices. Various other clashes prompted him to demand the resignation of all Police commanders who sympathised with the movement. After two days of widespread violence, during which Guardists killed some 120 Bucharest Jews, Antonescu sent in the Army, under the command of General Constantin Sănătescu. German officials acting on Hitler's orders, including the new Ambassador Manfred Freiherr von Killinger, helped Antonescu eliminate the Iron Guardists, but several of their lower-level colleagues actively aided Sima's subordinates. Goebbels was especially upset by the decision to support Antonescu, believing it to have been advantageous to "the Freemasons."

After the purge of the Iron Guard, Hitler kept his options open by granting political asylum to Sima—whom Antonescu's courts sentenced to death—and to other Legionaries in similar situations. The Guardists were detained in special conditions at Buchenwald and Dachau concentration camps. In parallel, Antonescu publicly obtained the cooperation of Codreanists, members of an Iron Guardist wing which had virulently opposed Sima, and whose leader was Codreanu's father Ion Zelea Codreanu. Antonescu again sought backing from the PNȚ and PNL to form a national cabinet, but his rejection of parliamentarism made the two groups refuse him.

Antonescu traveled to Germany and met Hitler on eight more occasions between June 1941 and August 1944. Such close contacts helped cement an enduring relationship between the two dictators, and Hitler reportedly came to see Antonescu as the only trustworthy person in Romania, and the only foreigner to consult on military matters. The American historian Gerhard Weinberg wrote that Hitler after first meeting Antonescu "...was greatly impressed by him; no other leader Hitler met other than Mussolini ever received such consistently favourable comments from the German dictator. Hitler even mustered the patience to listen to Antonescu's lengthy disquisitions on the glorious history of Romania and the perfidy of the Hungarians—a curious reversal for a man who was more accustomed to regaling visitors with tirades of his own." In later statements, Hitler offered praise to Antonescu's "breadth of vision" and "real personality." A remarkable aspect of the Hitler-Antonescu friendship was neither could speak other's language. Hitler only knew German, while the only foreign language Antonescu knew was French, in which he was completely fluent. During their meetings, Antonescu spoke French, which was then translated into German by Hitler's interpreter Paul Schmidt and vice versa, since Schmidt did not speak Romanian either.

The German military presence increased significantly in early 1941, when, using Romania as a base, Hitler invaded the rebellious Kingdom of Yugoslavia and the Kingdom of Greece. In parallel, Romania's relationship with the United Kingdom, at the time the only major adversary of Nazi Germany, erupted into conflict: on 10 February 1941, British Premier Winston Churchill recalled His Majesty's Ambassador Reginald Hoare, and approved the blockade of Romanian ships in British-controlled ports. On 12 June 1941, during another summit with Hitler, Antonescu first learned of the "special" nature of Operation Barbarossa, namely, that the war against the Soviet Union was to be an ideological war to "annihilate" the forces of "Judeo-Bolshevism," a "war of extermination" to be fought without any mercy; Hitler even showed Antonescu a copy of the "Guidelines for the Conduct of the Troops in Russia" he had issued to his forces about the "special treatment" to be handed out to Soviet Jews. Antonescu completely accepted Hitler's ideas about Operation Barbarossa as a "race war" between the Aryans, represented by the Nordic Germans and Latin Romanians on the Axis side vs. the Slavs and Asians, commanded by the Jews on the Soviet side. Besides anti-Semitism, there was an extremely strong current of anti-Slavic and anti-Asian racism to Antonescu's remarks about the "Asiatic hordes" of the Red Army. The Asians Antonescu referred were the various Asian peoples of the Soviet Union, such as the Kazakhs, Kalmyks, Mongols, Uzbeks, Buryats, etc. During his summit with Hitler in June 1941, Antonescu told the Führer that he believed it was necessary to "once and for all" eliminate Russia as a power because the Russians were the most powerful Slavic nation and that as a Latin people, the Romanians had an inborn hatred of all Slavs and Jews. Antonescu went on to tell Hitler: "Because of its racial qualities, Romania can continue to play its role as an anti-Slavic buffer for the benefit of Germany." Ancel wrote that Romanian anti-Slavic racism differed from the German variety in that the Romanians had traditionally feared the Slavic peoples whereas the Germans had traditionally held the Slavic peoples in contempt. In Antonescu's mind, the Romanians as a Latin people had attained a level of civilization that the Slavs were nowhere close to, but theoretically the Slavic Russians and Ukrainians might be able to reach under Romanian auspices, although Antonescu's remarks to Hitler that "We must fight this race (i.e. the Slavs) resolutely" together, "with the need for 'colonization' of Transnistria," suggests that he did think this would happen in his own lifetime. Subsequently, the Romanians assigned to Barbarossa were to learn that as a Latin people, the Germans considered them to be their inferiors, albeit not as inferior as the Slavs, Asians and Jews who were viewed as untermenschen ("sub-humans"). Hitler's promise to Antonescu that after the war, the Germanic and Latin races would rule the world in a partnership turned out to be meaningless.

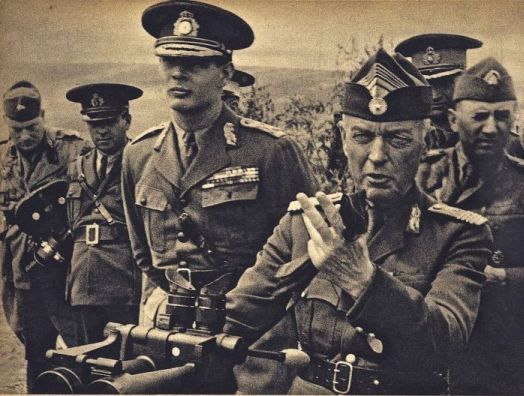
King Michael I and Antonescu at the border, on the river Prut, watching the deployment of the Romanian Army in 1941

In June of that year, Romania joined the attack on the Soviet Union, led by Germany in coalition with Hungary, Finland, the State of Slovakia, the Kingdom of Italy, and the Independent State of Croatia. Antonescu had been made aware of the plan by German envoys, and supported it enthusiastically even before Hitler extended Romania an offer to participate. On 18 June 1941, Antonescu gave orders to his generals about "cleansing the ground" of Jews when Romanian forces entered Bessarabia and Bukovina. Right from the start, Antonescu proclaimed the war against the Soviet Union to be a "holy war", a "crusade" in the name of Eastern Orthodox faith and the Romanian race against the forces of "Judeo-Bolshevism". The propaganda of the Antonescu regime demonised everything Jewish as Antonescu believed that Communism was invented by the Jews, and all of the Soviet leaders were really Jews. Reflecting Antonescu's anti-Slavic feelings, despite the fact that the war was billed as a "crusade" in defence of Orthodoxy against "Judeo-Bolshevism", the war was not presented as a struggle to liberate the Orthodox Russians and Ukrainians from Communism; instead rule by "Judeo-Bolshevism" was portrayed as something brought about the innate moral inferiority of the Slavs, who thus needed to be ruled by the Germans and the Romanians. The Romanian force engaged formed a General Antonescu Army Group under the effective command of German general Eugen Ritter von Schobert. Romania's campaign on the Eastern Front began without a formal declaration of war, and was consecrated by Antonescu's statement: "Soldiers, I order you, cross the Prut River" (in reference to the Bessarabian border between Romania and post-1940 Soviet territory). A few days after this, a large-scale pogrom was carried out in Iași with Antonescu's agreement; thousands of Jews were killed in the bloody Iași pogrom. Antonescu had followed a generation of younger right-wing Romanian intellectuals led by Corneliu Zelea Codreanu who in the 1920s–30s had rejected the traditional Francophilia of the Romanian elites and their adherence to Western notions of universal democratic values and human rights. Antonescu made it clear that his regime rejected the moral principles of the "demo-liberal world" and he saw the war as an ideological struggle between his spiritually pure "national-totalitarian regime" vs. "Jewish morality". Antonescu believed that the liberal humanist-democratic-capitalist values of the West and Communism were both invented by the Jews to destroy Romania. In a lengthy speech just before the war, Antonescu attacked democracy in the most violent terms as it allowed Jews equal rights and thus to undercut the Romanian "national idea". As such, Antonescu stated what was needed was a "new man" who would be "tough", "virile" and willing to fight for an ethnically and religiously "pure" Romania. Despite his quarrel with Sima, much of Antonescu's speech clearly reflected the influence of the ideas of the Iron Guard that Antonescu had absorbed in the 1930s. Antonescu's anti-Semitism and sexism went so far that he tacitly condoned the rape of Jewish women and girls in Bessarabia and northern Bukovinia by his forces under the grounds that he was going take away all of the property that the Jews had "stolen" from the Romanians, and as far he was concerned, Jewish females were just another piece of property. Since the Jewish women were going to be exterminated anyway, Antonescu felt there was nothing wrong about letting his soldiers and gendarmes have "some fun" before shooting them.

After becoming the first Romanian to be granted the Knight's Cross of the Iron Cross, which he received from Hitler at their 6 August meeting in the Ukrainian city of Berdychiv, Antonescu was promoted to Marshal of Romania by royal decree on 22 August, in recognition for his role in restoring the eastern frontiers of Greater Romania. In a report to Berlin, a German diplomat wrote that Marshal Antonescu had syphilis and that "among [Romanian] cavalry officers this disease is as widespread as a common cold is among German officers. The Marshal suffers from severe attacks of it every several months." Antonescu took one of his most debated decisions when, with Bessarabia's conquest almost complete, he committed Romania to Hitler's war effort beyond the Dniester—that is, beyond territory that had been part of Romania between the wars—and thrust deeper into Soviet territory, thus waging a war of aggression. On 30 August, Romania occupied a territory it deemed "Transnistria", formerly a part of the Ukrainian SSR (including the entire Moldavian ASSR and further territories). Like the decision to continue the war beyond Bessarabia, this earned Antonescu much criticism from the semi-clandestine PNL and PNȚ. Insofar as the war against the Soviet Union was a war to recover Bessarabia and northern Bukovina – both regions that been a part of Romania until June 1940 and that had Romanian majorities – the conflict had been very popular with the Romanian public opinion. But the idea of conquering Transnistria was not as that region had never been part of Romania, and a minority of the people were ethnic Romanian. Soon after the takeover, the area was assigned to a civil administration apparatus headed by Gheorghe Alexianu and became the site for the main component of the Holocaust in Romania: a mass deportation of the Bessarabian and Ukrainian Jews, followed later by transports of Romani Romanians and Jews from Moldavia proper (that is, the portions of Moldavia west of the Prut).

The accord over Transnistria's administration, signed in Tighina, also placed areas between the Dniester and the Dnieper under Romanian military occupation, while granting control over all resources to Germany. In September 1941, Antonescu ordered Romanian forces to take Odessa, a prize he badly wanted for reasons of prestige. Russians had traditionally been seen in Romania as brutal aggressors, and for Romanian forces to take a major Soviet city and one of the largest Black Sea ports like Odessa would be a sign of how far Romania had been "regenerated" under Antonescu's leadership. Much to Antonescu's intense fury, the Red Army were able to halt the Romanian offensive on Odessa and 24 September 1941 Antonescu had to reluctantly ask for the help of the Wehrmacht with the drive on Odessa. On 16 October 1941 Odessa fell to the German-Romanian forces. The Romanian losses had been so heavy that the area around Odessa was known to the Romanian Army as the Vale of Tears. Antonescu's anti-Semitism was sharpened by the Odessa fighting as he was convinced that the only reason why the Red Army had fought so fiercely around Odessa only because Soviet soldiers were terrorised by Jewish commissars into fighting hard. When Wilhelm Filderman wrote a letter to Antonescu complaining about the murder of Jews in Odessa, Antonescu wrote back: "Your Jews, who have become Soviet commissars, are driving Soviet soldiers in the Odessa region into a futile bloodbath, through horrendous terror techniques as the Russian prisoners themselves have admitted, simply to cause us heavy losses". Antonescu ended his letter with the claim that Russian Jewish commissars had savagely tortured Romanian POWs and that the entire Jewish community of Romania, Filderman included were morally responsible for all of the losses and sufferings of the Romanians around Odessa. In the fall of 1941, Antonescu planned to deport all of the Jews of the Regat, southern Bukovina and southern Transylvania into Transnistria as the prelude to killing them, but this operation was vetoed by Germany, who complained that Antonescu had not finished killing the Jews of Transnistria yet. This veto was largely motivated by bureaucratic politics, namely if Antonescu exterminated all of the Jews of Romania himself, there would be nothing for the SS and the Auswärtiges Amt to do. Killinger informed Antonescu that Germany would reduce its supplies of arms if Antonescu went ahead with his plans to deport the Jews of the Regat into Transnistria and told him he would be better off deporting the Jews to the death camps in Poland that the Germans were already busy building. Since Romania had almost no arms industry of its own and was almost entirely dependent upon weapons from Germany to fight the war, Antonescu had little choice, but to comply with Killinger's request.

=== Reversal of fortunes ===
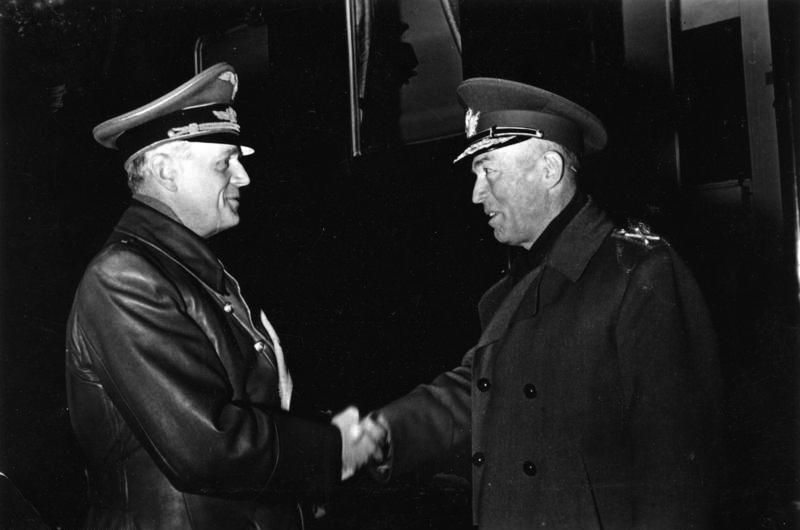
Antonescu being greeted by Joachim von Ribbentrop during a 1943 visit to Germany

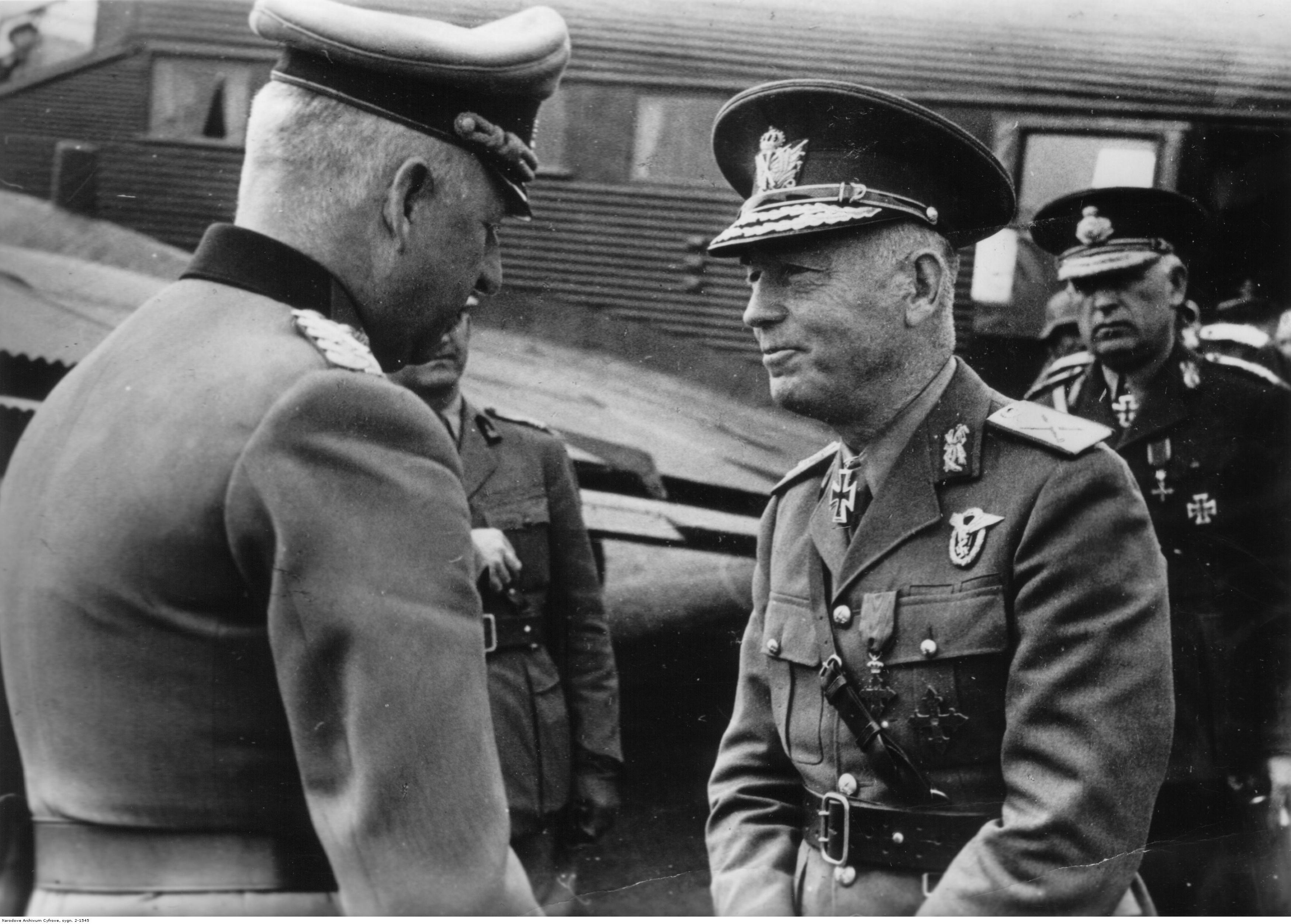
Erich von Manstein (left) welcomes Antonescu and General Dumitrescu (right) during a 1943 visit to Germany

The Romanian Army's inferior arms, insufficient armour and lack of training had been major concerns for the German commanders since before the start of the operation. One of the earliest major obstacles Antonescu encountered on the Eastern Front was the resistance of Odessa, a Soviet port on the Black Sea. Refusing any German assistance, he ordered the Romanian Army to maintain a two-month siege on heavily fortified and well-defended positions. The ill-equipped 4th Army suffered losses of some 100,000 men. Antonescu's popularity again rose in October, when the fall of Odessa was celebrated triumphantly with a parade through Bucharest's Arcul de Triumf, and when many Romanians reportedly believed the war was as good as won. In Odessa itself, the aftermath included a large-scale massacre of the Jewish population, ordered by the Marshal as retaliation for a bombing which killed a number of Romanian officers and soldiers (General Ioan Glogojeanu among them). The city subsequently became the administrative capital of Transnistria. According to one account, the Romanian administration planned to change Odessa's name to Antonescu. Antonescu planned that, once the war against the Soviet Union was won, he would invade Hungary to take back Transylvania and Bulgaria to take back the Dobruja with Antonescu being especially keen on the former. Antonescu planned on attacking Hungary to recover Transylvania at the first opportunity and regarded Romanian involvement on the Eastern Front in part as a way of proving to Hitler that Romania was a better German ally than Hungary, and thus deserving of German support when the planned Romanian-Hungarian war began. The Conducător had also created an intra-Axis alliance against Hungary along with Croatia and Slovakia.

As the Soviet Union recovered from the initial shock and slowed down the Axis offensive at the Battle of Moscow (October 1941 – January 1942), Romania was asked by its allies to contribute a larger number of troops. A decisive factor in Antonescu's compliance with the request appears to have been a special visit to Bucharest by Wehrmacht chief of staff Wilhelm Keitel, who introduced the Conducător to Hitler's plan for attacking the Caucasus. The Romanian force engaged in the war reportedly exceeded German demands. It came to around 500,000 troops and thirty actively involved divisions. As a sign of his satisfaction, Hitler presented his Romanian counterpart with a luxury car. On 7 December 1941, after reflecting on the possibility for Romania, Hungary and Finland to change their stance, the British government responded to repeated Soviet requests and declared war on all three countries. Following Japan's attack on Pearl Harbor and in compliance with its Axis commitment, Romania declared war on the United States within five days. These developments contrasted with Antonescu's own statement of 7 December: "I am an ally of the [German] Reich against [the Soviet Union], I am neutral in the conflict between Great Britain and Germany. I am for America against the Japanese."

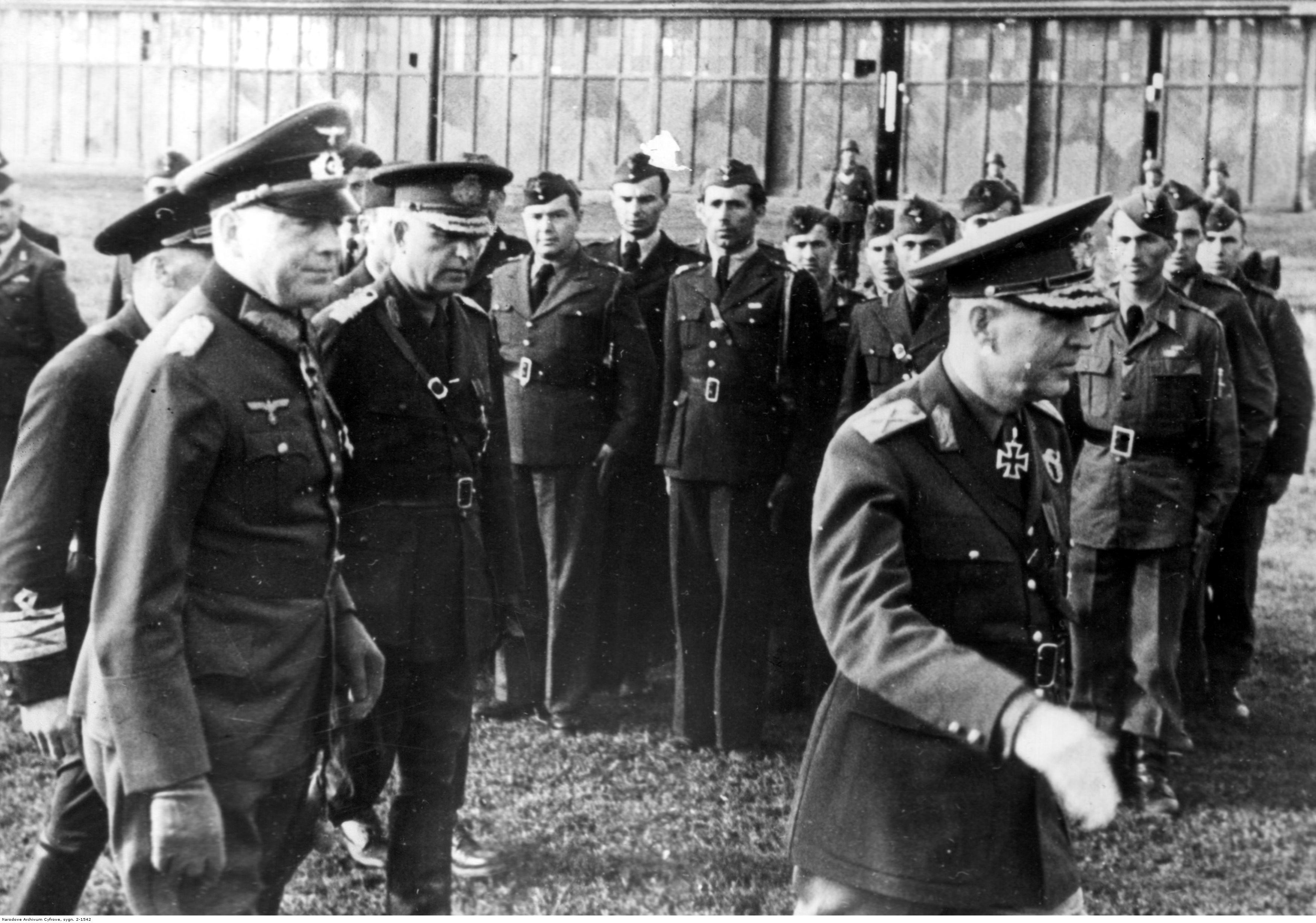
Antonescu arrives at the front with General Ewald von Kleist in June 1942, during the Axis summer offensive Case Blue

A crucial change in the war came with the Battle of Stalingrad in June 1942 – February 1943, a major defeat for the Axis. Romania's armies alone lost some 150,000 men (either dead, wounded or captured) and more than half of the country's divisions were wiped out. The loss of two entire Romanian armies who all either killed or captured by the Soviets produced a major crisis in German-Romanian relations in the winter of 1943 with many people in the Romanian government for the first time questioning the wisdom of fighting on the side of the Axis. Outside of the elites, by 1943 the continuing heavy losses on the Eastern Front, anger at the contempt which the Wehrmacht treated their Romanian allies and declining living standards within Romania made the war unpopular with the Romanian people, and consequently the Conducător himself. The American historian Gerhard Weinberg wrote that: "The string of broken German promises of equipment and support, the disregard of warnings about Soviet offensive preparations, the unfriendly treatment of retreating Romanian units by German officers and soldiers and the general German tendency to blame their own miscalculations and disasters on their allies all combined to produce a real crisis in German-Romanian relations." For part of that interval, the Marshal had withdrawn from public life, owing to an unknown affliction, which is variously rumoured to have been a mental breakdown, a foodborne illness or a symptom of the syphilis he had contracted earlier in life. He is known to have been suffering from digestive problems, treating himself with food prepared by Helene von Exner, an Austrian-born dietitian who moved into Hitler's service after 1943.

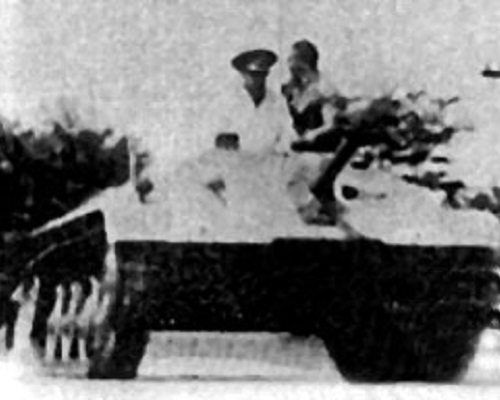
The Mareșal tank destroyer, named after Marshal Antonescu, who was involved in its development. It later inspired the German Hetzer

Upon his return, Antonescu blamed the Romanian losses on German overseer Arthur Hauffe, whom Hitler agreed to replace. In parallel with the military losses, Romania was confronted with large-scale economic problems. Romania's oil was the Reich's only source of natural oil after the invasion of the Soviet Union in June 1941 to August 1944 (Germany also had synthetic oil plants operating from 1942 onwards), and as such for economic reasons, Romania was always treated as a major ally by Hitler. While Germany monopolised Romania's exports, it defaulted on most of its payments. Like all countries whose exports to Germany, particularly in oil, exceeded imports from that country, Romania's economy suffered from Nazi control of the exchange rate. On the German side, those directly involved in harnessing Romania's economic output for German goals were economic planners Hermann Göring and Walther Funk, together with Hermann Neubacher, the Special Representative for Economic Problems. A recurring problem for Antonescu was attempting to obtain payments for all of the oil he shipped to Germany while resisting German demands for increased oil production. The situation was further aggravated in 1942, as USAAF and RAF were able to bomb the oil fields in Prahova County. Official sources from the following period amalgamate military and civilian losses of all kinds, which produces a total of 554,000 victims of the war. To improve the Romanian army's effectiveness, the Mareșal tank destroyer was developed starting in late 1942. Marshal Antonescu, after whom the vehicle was named, was involved in the project himself. The vehicle later influenced the development of the German Hetzer.

In this context, the Romanian leader acknowledged that Germany was losing the war, and he therefore authorised his Deputy Premier and new Foreign Minister Mihai Antonescu to set up contacts with the Allies. In early 1943, Antonescu authorised his diplomats to contact British and American diplomats in Portugal and Switzerland to see if were possible for Romania to sign an armistice with the Western powers. The Romanian diplomats were informed that no armistice was possible until an armistice was signed with the Soviet Union, a condition Antonescu rejected. In parallel, he allowed the PNȚ and the PNL to engage in parallel talks with the Allies at various locations in neutral countries. The discussions were strained by the Western Allies' call for an unconditional surrender, over which the Romanian envoys bargained with Allied diplomats in Sweden and Egypt (among them the Soviet representatives Nikolai Novikov and Alexandra Kollontai). Antonescu was also alarmed by the possibility of war being carried on Romanian territory, as had happened in Italy after Operation Avalanche. The events also prompted hostile negotiations aimed at toppling Antonescu, and involving the two political parties, the young monarch, diplomats and soldiers. A major clash between Michael and Antonescu took place during the first days of 1943, when the 21-year-old monarch used his New Year's address on national radio to part with the Axis war effort.

=== Ouster and arrest ===
In March 1944, the Soviet Red Army broke the Southern Bug and Dniester fronts, advancing on Bessarabia. This came just as Field Marshal Henry Maitland Wilson, the British Supreme Allied Commander of the Mediterranean theatre, presented Antonescu with an ultimatum. After a new visit to Germany and a meeting with Hitler, Antonescu opted to continue fighting alongside the remaining Axis states, a decision which he later claimed was motivated by Hitler's promise to allow Romania possession of Northern Transylvania in the event of an Axis victory. Upon his return, the Conducător oversaw a counteroffensive which stabilised the front on a line between Iași and Chișinău to the north and the lower Dniester to the east. This normalised his relations with Nazi German officials, whose alarm over the possible loss of an ally had resulted in the Margarethe II plan, an adapted version of the Nazi takeover in Hungary.

However, Antonescu's non-compliance with the terms of Wilson's ultimatum also had drastic effects on Romania's ability to exit the war. By then, Antonescu was conceiving of a separate peace with the Western Allies, while maintaining contacts with the Soviets. In parallel, the mainstream opposition movement came to establish contacts with the Romanian Communist Party (PCR), which, although minor numerically, gained importance for being the only political group to be favoured by Soviet leader Joseph Stalin. On the PCR side, the discussions involved Lucrețiu Pătrășcanu and later Emil Bodnăraș. Another participating group at this stage was the old Romanian Social Democratic Party.

Large-scale Allied bombings of Bucharest took place in spring 1944, while the Soviet Red Army approached Romanian borders. The Battle for Romania began in late summer: while German commanders Johannes Frießner and Otto Wöhler of the Army Group South Ukraine attempted to hold Bukovina, Soviet Steppe Front leader Rodion Malinovsky stormed into the areas of Moldavia defended by Petre Dumitrescu's troops. In reaction, Antonescu attempted to stabilise the front on a line between Focșani, Nămoloasa and Brăila, deep inside Romanian territory. On 5 August, he visited Hitler one final time in Kętrzyn. On this occasion, the German leader reportedly explained that his people had betrayed the Nazi cause, and asked him if Romania would go on fighting (to which Antonescu reportedly answered in vague terms). After Soviet Foreign Minister Vyacheslav Molotov more than once stated that the Soviet Union was not going to require Romanian subservience, the factions opposing Antonescu agreed that the moment had come to overthrow him, by carrying out the Royal Coup of 23 August. On that day, the sovereign asked Antonescu to meet him in the Royal Palace, where he presented him with a request to take Romania out of its Axis alliance. The Conducător refused, and was promptly arrested by soldiers of the guard, being replaced as Premier with General Constantin Sănătescu, who presided over a national government.

The new Romanian authorities declared peace with the Allies and advised the population to greet Soviet troops. On 25 August, as Bucharest was successfully defending itself against German retaliations, Romania declared war on Nazi Germany. The events disrupted German domination in the Balkans, putting a stop to the Maibaum offensive against Yugoslav Partisans. The coup was nevertheless a unilateral move, and, until the signature of an armistice on 12 September, the country was still perceived as an enemy by the Soviets, who continued to take Romanian soldiers as prisoners of war. In parallel, Hitler reactivated the Iron Guardist exile, creating a Sima-led government in exile that did not survive the war's end in Europe.

Placed in the custody of PCR militants, Antonescu spent the interval at a house in Bucharest's Vatra Luminoasă quarter. He was afterward handed to the Soviet occupation forces, who transported him to Moscow, together with his deputy Mihai Antonescu, Governor of Transnistria Gheorghe Alexianu, defence minister Constantin Pantazi, Gendarmerie commander Constantin Vasiliu and Bucharest Police chief Mircea Elefterescu. They were subsequently kept in luxurious detention at a mansion nearby the city, and guarded by SMERSH, a special counter-intelligence body answering directly to Stalin. Shortly after Germany surrendered in May 1945, the group was moved to Lubyanka prison. There, Antonescu was interrogated and reputedly pressured by SMERSH operatives, among them Viktor Abakumov, but transcripts of their conversations were never sent back to Romania by the Soviet authorities. Later research noted that the main issues discussed were the German-Romanian alliance, the war on the Soviet Union, the economic toll on both countries, and Romania's participation in the Holocaust (defined specifically as crimes against "peaceful Soviet citizens"). At some point during this period, Antonescu attempted suicide in his quarters. He was returned to Bucharest in spring 1946 and held in Jilava Prison. He was subsequently interrogated by prosecutor Avram Bunaciu, to whom he complained about the conditions of his detainment, contrasting them with those in Moscow, while explaining that he was a vegetarian and demanding a special diet.

=== Trial and execution ===
In May 1946, Antonescu was prosecuted at the first in a series of People's Tribunals, on charges of war crimes, crimes against the peace and treason. The tribunals had first been proposed by the PNȚ, and were comparable to the Nuremberg Trials in Allied-occupied Germany. The Romanian legislative framework was drafted by coup participant Pătrășcanu, a PCR member who had been granted leadership of the Justice Ministry. Despite the idea having earned support from several sides of the political spectrum, the procedures were politicised in a sense favourable to the PCR and the Soviet Union, and posed a legal problem for being based on ex post facto decisions. The first such local trial took place in 1945, resulting in the sentencing of Iosif Iacobici, Nicolae Macici, Constantin Trestioreanu and other military commanders directly involved in planning or carrying out the Odessa massacre.

Antonescu was represented by Constantin Paraschivescu-Bălăceanu and Titus Stoica, two public defenders whom he had first consulted with a day before the procedures were initiated. The prosecution team, led by Vasile Stoican, and the panel of judges, presided over by Alexandru Voitinovici, were infiltrated by PCR supporters. Both consistently failed to admit that Antonescu's foreign policies were overall dictated by Romania's positioning between Germany and the Soviet Union. Nevertheless, and although references to the mass murders formed just 23% of the indictment and corpus of evidence (ranking below charges of anti-Soviet aggression), the procedures also included Antonescu's admission of and self-exculpating take on war crimes, including the deportations to Transnistria. They also evidence his awareness of the Odessa massacre, accompanied by his claim that few of the deaths were his direct responsibility. One notable event at the trial was a testimony by PNȚ leader Iuliu Maniu. Reacting against the aggressive tone of other accusers, Maniu went on record saying: "We [Maniu and Antonescu] were political adversaries, not cannibals." Upon leaving the bench, Maniu walked toward Antonescu and shook his hand.

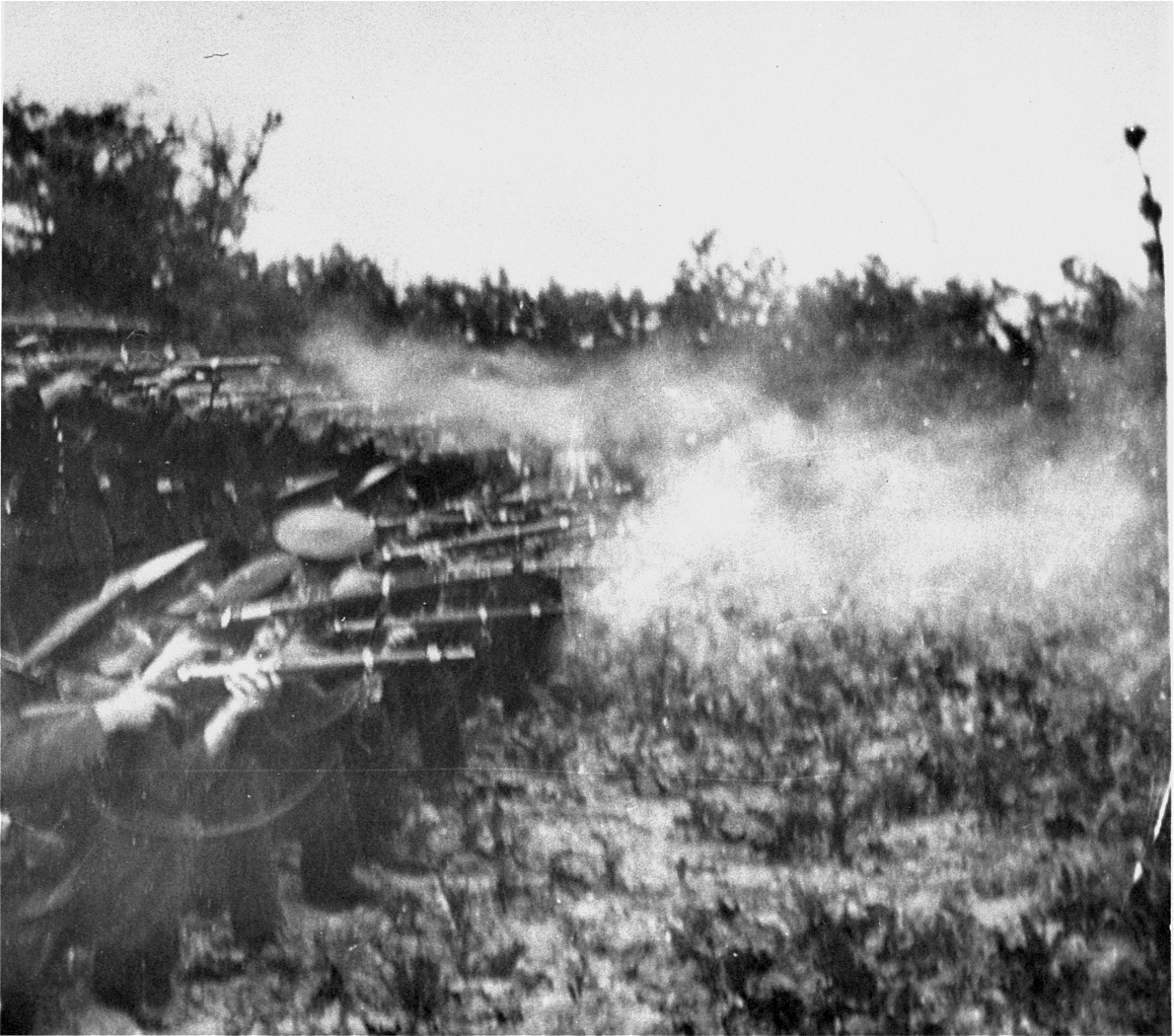
Antonescu's execution at Jilava, 1 June 1946

Ion Antonescu was found guilty of the charges. This verdict was followed by two sets of appeals, which claimed that the restored and amended 1923 Constitution did not offer a framework for the People's Tribunals and prevented capital punishment during peacetime, while noting that, contrary to the armistice agreement, only one power represented within the Allied Commission had supervised the tribunal. They were both rejected within six days, in compliance with a legal deadline on the completion of trials by the People's Tribunals. King Michael subsequently received pleas for clemency from Antonescu's lawyer and his mother, and reputedly considered asking the Allies to reassess the case as part of the actual Nuremberg Trials, taking Romanian war criminals into foreign custody. Subjected to pressures by the new Soviet-backed Petru Groza executive, he issued a decree in favour of execution. Together with his co-defendants Mihai Antonescu, Alexianu and Vasiliu, the former Conducător was executed by a military firing squad on 1 June 1946. Antonescu supporters circulated false rumours that regular soldiers had refused to fire at their commander, and that the squad was mostly composed of Jewish policemen. Another apologetic claim insists that he himself ordered the squad to shoot, but footage of the event has proven it false. However, he did refuse a blindfold and raised his hat in salute once the order was given. The execution site, some distance away from the locality of Jilava and the prison fort, was known as Valea Piersicilor ("Valley of the Peach Trees"). His final written statement was a letter to his wife, urging her to withdraw into a convent, while stating the belief that posterity would reconsider his deeds and accusing Romanians of being "ungrateful".

== Ideology, political suppression and the Holocaust ==
Antonescu's wartime regime was driven by a blend of ethnic nationalism, integral nationalism and politicised Christianity, aimed at securing the borders of a "Greater Romania". While technically allied with Nazi Germany, Antonescu's primary geopolitical objective remained the recovery of Northern Transylvania from Hungary by the eventual reversal of the Second Vienna Award. To justify his heavy deployment of over 500,000 troops to the Eastern Front during Operation Barbarossa, he framed the invasion as a "holy war" to reclaim lost Bessarabian territories and permanently eliminate the threat of Judeo-Bolshevism. Historians classify the administration as an authoritarian conservative and para-fascist military dictatorship. Though the regime initially shared power with the fascist Iron Guard in the National Legionary State, Antonescu ruthlessly crushed the Legionnaires' Rebellion in January 1941, dissolving the party to establish undisputed control. While he rejected the revolutionary mass-mobilisation techniques of traditional fascism, his regime incorporated extensive fascist trappings and enforced an aggressively militarised regulation of Romanian public life and administration. The domestic policies were explicitly defined by structural racism, antisemitism and antiziganism. Adhering closely to the conspiracy theory of "Jewish Bolshevism", Antonescu spearheaded systematic state-sanctioned violence independent of German pressure.

During World War II, Antonescu's regime was responsible for crimes against humanity by facilitating the Holocaust in Romania. Following the launch of Operation Barbarossa in 1941, Romania initiated a campaign of "ethnic cleansing" which included the Iași pogrom, the systematic execution of between 15,000–50,000 Jews during the 1941 Odessa massacre and the mass deportation of over 150,000 Jews and 25,000 Romani people to concentration camps in the Transnistria Governorate. Official estimates by the Wiesel Commission mention that between 280,000 and 380,000 Jews were killed by Romanian authorities under Antonescu's rule. Romania's extermination policies in captured territories commonly rank second only to Nazi Germany. However, the Jewish population in the Old Kingdom, which was between 300,000 and 400,000 people, survived the Holocaust almost intact.

Politicians maintained a cautious stance towards Ion Antonescu's regime. While others focused on the goal of reclaiming Greater Romania, such as Dinu Brătianu, who mentioned to his party colleagues that the new government was the best solution possible to the current crisis and urged them to provide Antonescu with all the support they could give, others were worried by his actively developing relationship with the Axis powers and Hitler himself. As the Second World War kept progressing, political figures who initially viewed the regime as the best possible solution to the crisis eventually voiced their concerns and became critics of the regime, warning Antonescu that Romania is risking its future and particularly being against the decision to extend the military campaigns beyond Romania's borders. Ion Antonescu has monitored opposition leaders through the Special Intelligence Service and suppressed them when they maintained disobedience, however, his early communications to Brătianu also featured offers of resignation which were rejected. Adolf Hitler once advised Ion Antonescu to have Iuliu Maniu killed, with Maniu's popularity among the peasants being the reason for the idea's dismissal. Many high-ranking officers risked and even lost their positions and roles by questioning the operation, such as Iosif Iacobici, then Chief of the Romanian General Staff, whose objection was the massive transfer of Romanian troops to the Eastern Front. Antonescu's racial discrimination laws and Romania's participation in the Holocaust was met with significant objections from various key people, such as Queen Mother Helen who actively intervened to save Jews from being deported and King Michael, Nicolae Bălan and René de Weck being credited with having helped to stop the continuation of the Final Solution in Romania. Dinu Brătianu also condemned the antisemitic measures, prompting Antonescu to accuse him of being an ally of "the Yid in London". Together with Maniu and Ion Mihalache, Brătianu sent statements condemning the isolation, persecution and expulsion of Jews, prompting Antonescu to threaten them. Both parties were occasionally ambiguous on racial issues, and themselves produced antisemitic messages. Some regular Romanians and people from inside the Jewish community also voluntarily intervened to save Jewish lives and rally in public protests against Antonescu's decisions.

=== Political underground ===
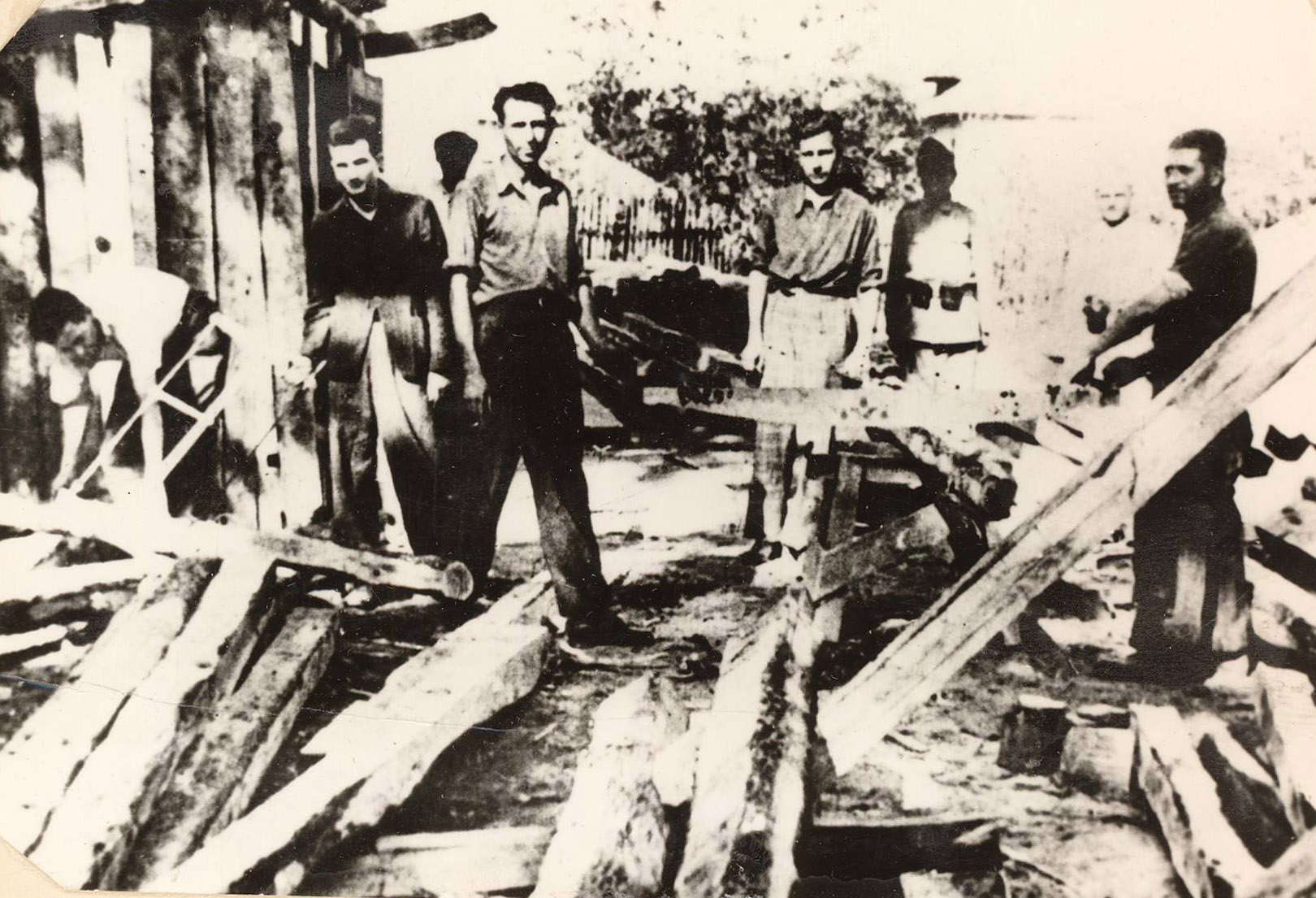
Political prisoners of the Antonescu regime, photographed in Târgu Jiu camp, 1943. Nicolae Ceaușescu, future leader of Communist Romania, is second from left

Organised resistance movements in Antonescu's Romania were comparatively small-scale and marginal. In addition to a Zionist underground which aided Jews to pass through or flee the country, the regime was confronted with local political movements of contrasting shades. One of them comprised far left and left-wing elements, which Antonescu's rise to power had caught in an unusual position. The minor Romanian Communist Party, outlawed since the rule of Ferdinand I for its Cominternist national policies, had been rendered virtually inactive by the German-Soviet non-aggression pact. Once reanimated by Operation Barbarossa, the PCR was unable to create an actual armed resistance movement, although it was able to coordinate the policies of several other small leftist groups. Speaking shortly before the invasion of the Soviet Union, and adopting the "Jewish Bolshevism" position, Antonescu ordered authorities to compile lists comprising "the names of all Jewish and communist agents", who were to be kept under close surveillance. Among people arrested on suspicion of communism, Jews were sent to Transnistrian sites such as Vapniarka and Rîbnița, while others were interned in regular facilities such as those in Caransebeș and Târgu Jiu. In all, some 2,000 Jewish Romanian deportees to the region had been accused of political crimes (the category also included those who had tried to escape forced labour). According to one estimate, people held on charges of being communists accounted for just under 2,000 people, of whom some 1,200 were jailed in Romania proper. Capital punishment was used against various partisan-like activists, while the vast majority of communist prisoners in Rîbnița were massacred in March 1944. At the other end of the political spectrum, after the Legionary Rebellion and the Iron Guard's decapitation, many Legionaries who opposed the regime, and whom Antonescu himself believed were "communists in [Legionary] green shirts", were killed or imprisoned. An Iron Guardist underground was nevertheless formed locally, and probably numbered in thousands. Some of Antonescu's political prisoners from both camps were given a chance to redeem themselves by joining units on the Eastern Front.

Although repressed, divided and weak, the PCR capitalised on the Soviet victories, being integrated into the mainstream opposition. At the same time, a "prison faction" emerged around Gheorghe Gheorghiu-Dej, opposing both the formal leadership and the so-called "Muscovite" communists who had taken refuge in the Soviet Union before the war. While maneuvering for control within the PCR during and after 1944, "prison" communists destroyed a third group, formed around the PCR's nominal leader Ștefan Foriș (whom they kidnapped and eventually killed). The PCR leadership was still suffering from a crisis of legitimacy after beginning talks with the larger parties. The Soviets and "Muscovite" communists campaigned among Romanian prisoners of war in order to have them switch sides in the war, and eventually managed to set up the Tudor Vladimirescu Division.

=== Cultural circles ===
Measures enforced by the Antonescu regime had contradictory effects on the Romanian cultural scene. According to Romanian literary historians Letiția Guran and Alexandru Ștefan, "the Antonescu regime [...] did not affect negatively cultural modernity. The Romanian cultural elite regarded Antonescu's policies for the most part with sympathy." Nevertheless, other researchers record the dissent of several cultural environments: the classic liberalism and cosmopolitanism of aging literary theorist Eugen Lovinescu, the "Lovinescian" Sibiu Literary Circle, and the rebellious counterculture of young avant-garde writers (Ion Caraion, Geo Dumitrescu, Dimitrie Stelaru, Constant Tonegaru). Prominent left-wing writers Tudor Arghezi, Victor Eftimiu and Zaharia Stancu were political prisoners during the Antonescu years. Author George Călinescu also stood out against the official guidelines, and, in 1941, took a risk by publishing a synthesis of Romanian literature which emphasised Jewish contributions, while composer George Enescu pleaded with Antonescu personally for the fate of Romani musicians. Similar acts of solidarity were performed by various prominent intellectuals and artists. In August 1942, King Michael received a manifesto endorsed by intellectuals from various fields, deploring the murders in Transnistria, and calling for a realignment of policies. Another such document of April 1944 called for an immediate peace with the Soviet Union. On a more intimate level, a diary kept by philosopher and art critic Alice Voinescu expresses her indignation over the antisemitic measures and massacres.

A special aspect of political repression and cultural hegemony was Antonescu's persecution of Evangelical or Restorationist Christian denominations, first outlawed under the National Legionary regime. Several thousand adherents of the Pentecostal Union and the Baptist Union were reportedly jailed in compliance with his orders. Persecution targeted groups of religiously motivated conscientious objectors. In addition to the Inochentist movement, these groups included the Pentecostal Union, the Seventh-day Adventist Conference and the Jehovah's Witnesses Association. Antonescu himself recounted having contemplated using the death penalty against "sects" who would not allow military service, and ultimately deciding in favour of deporting "recalcitrant" ones. On 9 September 1940, the Ministry of Culture and Art issued a list of confessions that were recognised and protected by the regime. The list included the Romanian Orthodox Church, the Greek Catholic Church, the Roman Catholic Church, the Armenian Orthodox Church, the Ukrainian Orthodox Church, the Calvinist Church, the Lutheran Church, the Unitarian Church, and Islam. Any confession not listed was considered officially banned.

== Legacy ==
=== Consequences of the Antonescu trial ===
The period following Antonescu's fall returned Romania to a democratic regime and the 1923 Constitution, as well as its participation in the war alongside the Allies. However, it also saw the early stages of a communist takeover—which culminated with King Michael's forced abdication on 30 December 1947 and the subsequent establishment of Communist Romania. The Antonescu trial thus fit into a long series of similar procedures and political purges on charges of collaborationism, instrumented by the Romanian People's Tribunals and various other institutions. During the rigged general election of 1946 and for years after Antonescu's execution, the Romanian Communist Party and its allies began using the implications of his trial as an abusive means of compromising some of their political opponents. One such early example was Iuliu Maniu, by then one of the country's prominent anti-communists, who was accused of being a fascist and an Antonescu sympathiser, mainly for having shaken his hand during the trial. The enlistment of ethnic Germans into Nazi German units, as approved by Antonescu, was used as a pretext for a Soviet-led expulsion of Germans from Romania. On similar grounds, the Soviet occupation forces organised the capture of certain Romanian citizens, as well as the return of war refugees from Romania proper into Bessarabia and Northern Bukovina. Both the arrestees and the returnees were often deported deeper into the Soviet Union. As part of its deteriorating relationship with Romanian Roman Catholics, and urged on by the Soviets, the communist cabinet of Petru Groza also deemed Apostolic Nuncio Andrea Cassulo a collaborator of Antonescu and a persona non grata, based on transcripts of the Cassulo-Antonescu conversations. It also used such allegations to pressure several Greek-Catholic clergymen into accepting union with the Romanian Orthodox Church.

Nevertheless, Romanian-born Holocaust historian Radu Ioanid notes, few Romanians involved in organizing the Holocaust were prosecuted, and, of those, none were executed after the Antonescu trial. He attributes this to nationalist resistance within the administrative and judicial apparatus, to communist fears of alienating a too large number of people, to the emigration of Zionist survivors, and to the open hostility of some communists toward liberal Jewish community leaders. Jews also faced conflict with the new authorities and with the majority population, as described by other researchers. There were, nonetheless, sporadic trials for Holocaust-related crimes, including one of Maria Antonescu. Arrested in September 1944 and held 1945–1946 in Soviet custody, she was re-arrested at home in 1950, tried and ultimately found guilty of economic crimes for her collaboration with the Central Jewish Office. Five years later, she was sent into internal exile, and died of heart problems in 1964. After 1950, a large number of convicted war criminals, even some sentenced to life imprisonment, were deemed fit for "social cohabitation" (that is, fit to live amongst the general population) and released, while some suspects were never prosecuted.

=== In communist historiography ===
Although the Marxist analytical works of the increasingly marginalised communist figure Lucrețiu Pătrășcanu make isolated mentions of the Holocaust, the heavily politicised official discourse inspired by Soviet historiography interpreted Romania's wartime evolution exclusively based on the Marxist-Leninist idea of class conflict. In this context, the main effort to document and expose the Antonescu-era massacres came from Jewish Romanians. This began in 1945, when Jewish journalists Marius Mircu and Maier Rudrich contributed first-hand testimonies. In 1946–1948, the Jewish community leader Matatias Carp published Cartea neagră ("The Black Book"), a voluminous and detailed account of all stages of the Holocaust. After forming a secondary element in Antonescu's indictment, the deportation of Romani people was largely ignored in official discourse.

The communist regime overemphasised the part played by the PCR in King Michael's Coup, while commemorating its 23 August date as a national holiday. The Gheorghe Gheorghiu-Dej faction emerged as the winner of the interior PCR struggles and incorporated nationalist discourse. That faction claimed a decisive role in toppling Antonescu, even though a majority of its members had been jailed for most of the period. In accordance with Stalinist principles, censorship produced historical revisionism that excluded focus on such negative aspects of Romanian behaviour during the war as antisemitism and the Holocaust, and obscured Romania's participation on the Eastern Front. Beginning in the mid-1960s, when Nicolae Ceaușescu took power and embarked on a national communist course, the celebration of 23 August as the inception of the communist regime was accompanied by a contradictory tendency, which implied a gradual rehabilitation of Antonescu and his regime. Historians who focused on this period believe that the revival of nationalist tenets and the relative distance taken from Soviet policies contributed to the rehabilitation process. After a period of liberalization, the increasingly authoritarian Ceaușescu regime revived the established patterns of personalised rule, and even made informal use of the title Conducător. Beginning in the early 1970s, when the new policies were consecrated by the July Theses, Ceaușescu tolerated a nationalist, antisemitic and Holocaust denialist intellectual faction, illustrated foremost by Săptămîna and Luceafărul magazines of Eugen Barbu and Corneliu Vadim Tudor, by poet Adrian Păunescu and his Flacăra journal, and by novelist Ion Lăncrănjan. The regime also came to cultivate a relationship with exiled tycoon Iosif Constantin Drăgan, a former Iron Guard member who had come to endorse both Antonescu's rehabilitation and the national communist version of protochronism. In contrast, much of dissident culture and the Romanian diaspora embraced the image of Michael I as its counterpart to the increasingly official Antonescu myth. Lucian Boia described this as "the spectacular confrontation between the two contradictory myths [transposing] into historical and mythological terms a fundamental fissure which divides the Romanian society of today."

Topics relating to the Holocaust in Romania were distorted during the communist era. Ceaușescu himself mentioned the number of survivors of the deportations (some 50,000 people) as a total number of victims, failed to mention the victims' ethnic background, and presented most of them as "communists and antifascists." The regime also placed emphasis on the Holocaust in Northern Transylvania (where the Final Solution had been applied by the Germans and the local Arrow Cross Party). Vladimir Tismăneanu has said Antonescu has a "pseudo-sacred aura" and many Romanians consider the attempts to diminish this to be an affront to their national dignity: "In post-Communist societies, fantasies of persecution offer immense gratification to large strata of frustrated individuals". These national views are based on propaganda advanced during the Ceaușescu regime.

Earlier accounts of the massacres, which had already been placed under restricted use, were completely removed from public libraries. While a special politicised literature dealt with the Holocaust in Hungary, the entire Ceaușescu period produced only one work entirely dedicated to Romania's participation. Centred on the Iași pogrom, it shifted the blame from Romanian authorities and advanced a drastically reduced death toll. In its preface, official historian Nicolae Minei claimed that Romania was not responsible for any deaths among Jews. Other official texts made more radical claims, openly denying that Antonescu's regime was antisemitic, and that all those killed were victims of Germany or of circumstance.

=== Debates of the 1990s ===
Romanians' image of Antonescu shifted several times after the 1989 Revolution toppled communism. Polls carried out in the 1990s show the Conducător was well liked by portions of the general public. This tendency, Lucian Boia argues, was similar to a parallel trend favouring Wallachia's 15th century Prince Vlad III the Impaler, indicating a preference for "authoritarian solutions" and reflecting "a pantheon that was largely set in place in the 'Ceaușescu era' ". It was also popular at the time to see the 1944 Coup exclusively as the onset of communization in Romania, while certain sections of the public opinion revived the notion of "Jewish Bolshevism", accusing Jews of having brought communism to Romania. British historian Tony Judt connected such reflexes to growing anti-Russian sentiment and Holocaust denial in various countries of the former Eastern Bloc, and termed them collectively "mis-memory of anti-communism". Vladimir Tismăneanu, a prominent Romanian-born political scientist, referred to Antonescu's "pseudo-sacred" image with the post-1989 public, and to the phenomenon as "fantasies of persecution." The wartime dictator's image appealed to many politicians of the post-1989 period, and sporadic calls for his rehabilitation were issued at the highest levels of authority. Far right groups issued calls for his canonization by the Romanian Orthodox Church (together with a similar request to canonise Corneliu Zelea Codreanu). Certain neofascist groups claim to represent a legacy of Codrenism from which Sima was a deviationist, and these have also become Antonescu apologists.

A particular case in this process was that of forces gathered around the Greater Romania Party, a group often characterised as merging xenophobic or neofascist messages and the legacy of Ceaușescu's national communism. Founded by party leader and former Săptămîna contributor Corneliu Vadim Tudor, România Mare magazine is known to have equated Antonescu and Ceaușescu, presenting them both as "apostles of the Romanian people". In his bid for the office of President during the 1996 election, Vadim Tudor vowed to be a new Antonescu. Boia remarks that this meeting of extremes offers an "extraordinary paradox". Drăgan also openly resumed his activities in Romania, often in collaboration with Vadim Tudor's group, founding three organizations tasked with campaigning for Antonescu's rehabilitation: the media outlet Europa Nova, the Ion Antonescu Foundation and the Ion Antonescu League. His colleague Radu Theodoru endorsed such projects while accusing Jews of being "a long-term noxious factor" and claiming that it was actually ethnic Romanians who were victims of a communist Holocaust. Ion Coja and Paul Goma notably produced radical claims relying on fabricated evidence and deflecting blame for the crimes onto the Jews themselves. Several journals edited by Ion Cristoiu repeatedly argued in favour of Antonescu's rehabilitation, also making xenophobic claims; similar views were sporadically present in national dailies of various hues, such as Ziua, România Liberă and Adevărul.

Various researchers argue that the overall tendency to exculpate Antonescu was endorsed by the ruling National Salvation Front (FSN) and its successor group, later known as Social Democratic Party, who complemented an emerging pro-authoritarian lobby while depicting their common opponent King Michael and his supporters as traitors. Similar attempts to deny the role of Antonescu in the Holocaust were also made by the main opposition parties, the Christian Democratic National Peasants' Party and the National Liberal Party, with Radu Câmpeanu, the latter party's president, publicly describing the wartime leader as a "great Romanian" who tried to defend the Jews. Sections of both governing and opposition groups contemplated the idea of rehabilitating the wartime leader, and, in May 1991, Parliament observed a moment of silence in his memory. The perceived governmental tolerance of Antonescu's rehabilitation raised international concern and protests. While the FSN-supported Romanian President Ion Iliescu publicly opposed attempts to rehabilitate Antonescu and acknowledged the "crimes he committed against the Jews", it was his successor, Emil Constantinescu, a representative of the Democratic Convention, who in 1997 became the first Romanian officeholder to recognise the collective responsibility of Romanian authorities. Nevertheless, during the same period, Attorney General Sorin Moisescu followed a since-deprecated special appeal procedure to overturn sentences passed against Antonescu and other 1946 defendants, which he eventually withdrew.

To a certain degree, such pro-Antonescu sentiments were also present in post-1989 historiography. Reflecting back on this phenomenon in 2004, Maria Bucur wrote: "the perverse image of Antonescu is not the product of a propaganda campaign led by right-wing extremists, but a pervasive myth fed by historical debates and political contests, and which the public seems indifferent to or accepts unproblematically." After the Revolution, archival sources concerning Antonescu, including those in the National Archives of Romania, were made more available to researchers, but documents confiscated or compiled by Soviet officials, kept in Russia, remained largely inaccessible. Although confronted with more evidence from the newly opened archives, several historians, including some employed by official institutions, continued to deny the Holocaust in Romania, and attributed the death toll exclusively to German units. In parallel, some continued an exclusive focus on Northern Transylvanian massacres. Local authors who have actively promoted Antonescu's image as a hero and wrote apologetic accounts of his politics include historians Gheorghe Buzatu and Mihai Pelin, and researcher Alex Mihai Stoenescu. Larry L. Watts published a similarly controversial monograph in the United States. Although criticised for denying the uniqueness of the Holocaust and downplaying Antonescu's complicity, Dinu C. Giurescu was recognised as the first post-communist Romanian historian to openly acknowledge his country's participation, while his colleagues Șerban Papacostea and Andrei Pippidi were noted as early critics of attempts to exculpate Antonescu. The matter of crimes in Transnistria and elsewhere was first included within the Romanian curriculum with a 1999 state-approved alternative textbook edited by Sorin Mitu.

=== Wiesel Commission and aftermath ===
In 2003, after a period in which his own equivocal stance on the matter had drawn controversy, Constantinescu's successor Ion Iliescu established the Wiesel Commission, an international group of expert historians whose mission was the study of the Holocaust in Romania, later succeeded by the Elie Wiesel National Institute. The Final Report compiled by the Commission brought the official recognition of Antonescu's participation in the Holocaust. After that moment, public displays of support for Antonescu became illegal. Antonescu's SMERSH interrogations were recovered from the Russian archives and published in 2006. Despite the renewed condemnation and exposure, Antonescu remained a popular figure: as a result of the 2006 Mari Români series of polls conducted by the national station TVR 1, viewers nominated Antonescu as the 6th greatest Romanian ever. The vote's knockout phase included televised profiles of the ten most popular figures, and saw historian Adrian Cioroianu using the portion dedicated to Antonescu to expose and condemn him, giving voters reasons not to see the dictator as a great Romanian. The approach resulted in notable controversy after Ziua newspaper criticised Cioroianu, who defended himself by stating he had an obligation to tell the truth.

The same year, on 5 December, the Bucharest Court of Appeal overturned Antonescu's conviction for certain crimes against peace, on the grounds that the objective conditions of 1940 justified a preventive war against the Soviet Union, which would make Article 3 of the 1933 Convention for the Definition of Aggression inapplicable in his case (as well as in those of Alexianu, Constantin Pantazi, Constantin Vasiliu, Sima, and various Iron Guard politicians). This act raised official protests in Moldova, the independent state formed in Bessarabia upon the breakup of the Soviet Union, and in Russia, the Soviet successor state, as well as criticism by historians of the Holocaust. The Court of Appeals decision was overturned by the Romanian Supreme Court in May 2008. The same year, Maria Antonescu's collateral inheritors advanced a claim on a Predeal villa belonging to the couple, but a Brașov tribunal rejected their request, citing laws which confiscated the property of war criminals.

=== Cultural legacy, portrayals and landmarks ===
Beyond their propaganda and censorship efforts, Antonescu and his regime had a sizable impact on Romanian culture, art and literature. Owing to austere guidelines on culture and to the circumstances of wartime, this period's direct imprint is less than that of other periods in the country's history. Few large heroes' memorials were built during the war years. Memorials produced at the time were mainly roadside triptychs (troițe). The Heroes' Cult organization received expropriation rights to Bucharest's Jewish cemetery in 1942, and proposed to replace it with a major monument of this category, but that plan was eventually abandoned. Antonescu and his wife preferred donating to Orthodox churches, and were ktitors of churches in three separate Bucharest areas: Mărgeanului Church in Rahova, one in Dămăroaia, and the Saints Constantine and Helena Church in Muncii, where both the Marshal and his wife are depicted in a mural. After floods took a toll on his native Argeș County, the Marshal himself established Antonești, a model village in Corbeni (partly built by Ukrainian prisoners of war, and later passed into state property), while ordering hydroelectric exploitation of the Argeș River. He also had sporadic contacts with the artistic and literary environment, including an interview he awarded to his supporter, writer Ioan Alexandru Brătescu-Voinești. His 1946 trial was notably attended and documented by George Călinescu in a series of articles for Națiunea journal. Political humour of the 1940s preserved distinct images of the Romanian leader. Romanian jokes circulated under Antonescu's rule ridiculed his adoption of the title Marshal of Romania, viewing it as a self-promotion and dubbing him the "Auto-Marshal". During the war, Soviet agitprop portrayed Antonescu and the other secondary Axis leaders as villains and servile dog-like creatures, representations notably present in musical theater and puppetry shows, as well as in press cartoons.

Marin Preda's 1975 novel Delirul displays the Ceaușescu regime's ambiguous relationship with Antonescu. Critics John Neubauer and Marcel Cornis-Pope remark that the novel is "admittedly not [Preda's] best work", and discuss his "complex representation" of Antonescu as "an essentially flawed but active leader who tried to negotiate some maneuvering room between the demands of Germany and the threats of the Soviet Union [and whose failure] led to the dismantling of Romania's fragile democratic system." The book sought Antonescu's rehabilitation for his attitudes on the Bessarabia-Northern Bukovina issue, but did not include any mention of his antisemitic policies, of which Preda himself may have been ignorant. An international scandal followed, once negative comments on the book were published by the Soviet magazine Literaturnaya Gazeta. Although an outspoken nationalist, Eugen Barbu produced a satirical image of Antonescu in his own 1975 novel, Incognito, which was described by Deletant as "character assassination".

During the 1990s, monuments to Antonescu were raised and streets were named after him in Bucharest and several other cities. Among those directly involved in this process were Iosif Constantin Drăgan, the nationalist Mayor of Cluj-Napoca, Gheorghe Funar, and General Mircea Chelaru, whose resignation from the Army was subsequently requested and obtained. Also during that interval, in 1993, filmmaker and Social Democratic politician Sergiu Nicolaescu produced Oglinda, which depicts Antonescu (played by Ion Siminie) apologetically. The rehabilitation trend was also represented at an October 1994 commemorative exhibit at the National Military Museum. The same year, a denialist documentary film, Destinul mareșalului ("The Marshal's Destiny"), was distributed by state-owned companies, a matter which raised concern. After the Wiesel Commission presented its findings and such public endorsement was outlawed, statues in Antonescu's likeness were torn down or otherwise made unavailable for public viewing. An unusual case is that of his Saints Constantine and Helena Church, where, after lengthy debates, his bust was sealed inside a metal box. Outside of this context, the publicised display of Antonescu's portraits and racist slogans by football hooligans during Liga I's 2005–2006 season prompted UEFA intervention. As of 2026, Romania had two streets named after Antonescu, in Bechet and Râmnicu Sărat, as well as a bust at a church in Sărmașu. A street in Horești, Moldova is also named after him.

== Awards and decorations ==
Antonescu received a number of awards and decorations throughout his military career, most notable being the Order of Michael the Brave, which was personally awarded to him by King Ferdinand I during the Hungarian–Romanian War of 1919. He also received several decorations from foreign countries. He was the first Romanian to receive the Knight's Cross of the Iron Cross, being awarded it by Hitler himself.

Award or decoration	Country	Date	Place	Note	Ref
Medal of Military Virtue (1st Class in Gold)	Romania	1913	Southern Dobruja	Romania's highest military decoration at the time. Only received by one other officer in the army during the Second Balkan War.	
Order of Michael the Brave (3rd, 2nd, and 1st Class received)	Romania	1919	Tisza River, Hungary	Romania's highest military decoration. Upon crossing the River Tisza, King Ferdinand took the Order of Michael the Brave from his own uniform and presented it to Antonescu, saying "Antonescu, no one in this country knows better than the King how much they owe you."	
Pilot/Observer Badge in Gold with Diamonds	Germany	June 1941		Bestowed to honor exceptional success, presented to Antonescu by Reichsmarschall Hermann Göring.	
Iron Cross (2nd, and 1st Class received)	Germany	6 August 1941	Berdychiv	Awarded for bravery in battle as well as other military contributions in a battlefield environment.	
Knight's Cross of the Iron Cross	Germany	6 August 1941	Berdychiv	Nazi Germany's highest decoration for its military and paramilitary forces during World War II. First Romanian to receive the award.	
Grand Cross of the White Rose of Finland with Swords	Finland	January 1942	Bucharest	One of three highest state orders of Finland, established in 1919 by Carl Gustaf Emil Mannerheim.	
Crimea Shield in gold	Germany	3 July 1942	Bucharest	The first recipient of this award, bestowed upon Antonescu by Erich von Manstein on Hitler's behalf	
Grand Cross of the Order of the Cross of Liberty with Swords	Finland	10 November 1943		The oldest of the Finnish state orders	

== References and further reading ==
- Final Report Archived 15 September 2018 at the Wayback Machine of the International Commission on the Holocaust in Romania, Polirom, Iași, 2004. ISBN 973-681-989-2
- Viorel Achim, The Roma in Romanian History, Central European University Press, Budapest, 2004. ISBN 963-9241-84-9
- Jean Ancel,
  - Preludiu la asasinat. Pogromul de la Iași, 29 iunie 1941, Polirom, Iași, 2005. ISBN 973-681-799-7
  - " 'The New Jewish Invasion' – The Return of the Survivors in Transnistria", in David Bankier (ed.), The Jews are Coming Back: The Return of the Jews to Their Countries of Origin after WWII, Berghahn Books, Providence, 2005, pp. 231–256. ISBN 1-57181-527-9
- Lucian Boia, Istorie și mit în conștiința românească, Humanitas, Bucharest, 1997. ISBN 973-50-0055-5
- Christopher R. Browning, The Origins of the Final Solution: The Evolution of Nazi Jewish Policy, September 1939 – March 1942, University of Nebraska Press, Lincoln, 2004. ISBN 978-0-8032-5979-9
- Maria Bucur,
  - "Edifices of the Past: War Memorials and Heroes in Twentieth-century Romania", in Maria Todorova (ed.), Balkan Identities: Nation and Memory, C. Hurst & Co. Publishers, London, 2004, pp. 158–179. ISBN 1-85065-715-7
  - "Women's Stories as Sites of Memory: Gender and Remembering Romania's World Wars", in Nancy M. Wingfield, Maria Bucur (eds.), Gender & War in Twentieth-century Eastern Europe, Indiana University Press, Bloomington, 2006, pp. 171–192
- Christopher Chant, The Encyclopedia of Codenames of World War II, Routledge & Kegan Paul Books Ltd., London, 1987. ISBN 0-7102-0718-2
- Adrian Cioroianu, Pe umerii lui Marx. O introducere în istoria comunismului românesc, Editura Curtea Veche, Bucharest, 2005. ISBN 973-669-175-6
- Marcel Cornis-Pope, John Neubauer (eds.), History of the Literary Cultures of East-Central Europe, John Benjamins, Amsterdam & Philadelphia, 2004. ISBN 90-272-3452-3; see:
  - Letiția Guran, Alexandru Ștefan, "Romanian Literature under Stalinism", pp. 112–124
  - John Neubauer et al., "1945", pp. 143–177
- Dennis Deletant, Hitler's Forgotten Ally: Ion Antonescu and His Regime, Romania, 1940–1944, Palgrave Macmillan, London, 2006. ISBN 1-4039-9341-6
- Dennis Deletant, "Romania" in The Oxford Companion to World War II edited by I. C. B. Dear and M. R. D. Foot (2001) pp 954–959.
- Stanislaw Frankowski, "Post-Communist Europe", in Peter Hodgkinson, Andrew Rutherford (eds.), Capital Punishment: Global Issues and Prospects, Waterside Press, Winchester, 1996, pp. 215–242. ISBN 1-872870-32-5
- Aleksander Gella, Development of Class Structure in Eastern Europe: Poland and Her Southern Neighbors, State University of New York Press, Albany, 1989. ISBN 0-88706-833-2
- Juliana Geran Pilon, The Bloody Flag. Post-Communist Nationalism in Eastern Europe. Spotlight on Romania (Studies in Social Philosophy & Policy No. 16), Transaction Publishers, New Brunswick & London, 1992. ISBN 1-56000-620-X
- Dinu C. Giurescu, Romania in the Second World War: 1939–1945 (East European Monographs, 2000).
- Roger Griffin, The Nature of Fascism, Routledge, London, 1993. ISBN 0-415-09661-8
- Arnold D. Harvey, Collision of Empires: Britain in Three World Wars, 1793–1945, Continuum International Publishing Group, London, 1992. ISBN 1-85285-078-7
- Rebecca Ann Haynes, " 'A New Greater Romania'? Romanian Claims to the Serbian Banat in 1941", in Central Europe, Vol. 3, No. 2, November 2005, pp. 99–120; republished by University College London's Library Services
- Radu Ioanid, "Romania", in David S. Wyman, Charles H. Rosenzveig (eds.), The World Reacts to the Holocaust, Johns Hopkins University Press, Baltimore & London, 1996, pp. 225–252. ISBN 0-8018-4969-1
- Michelle Kelso, "Gypsy Deportations from Romania to Transnistria, 1942–44", in Karola Fings, Donald Kenrick (eds.), In the Shadow of the Swastika: Volume 2: The Gypsies during the Second World War, University of Hertfordshire Press, Hatfield, 1999, pp. 95–130. ISBN 0-900458-85-2
- Padraic Kenney, The Burdens of Freedom: Eastern Europe since 1989, Zed Books, London, 2006. ISBN 1-84277-663-0
- Peter C. Kent, The Lonely Cold War of Pope Pius XII: The Roman Catholic Church and the Division of Europe, 1943–1950, McGill-Queen's University Press, Montreal & Kingston, 2002. ISBN 0-7735-2326-X
- Charles King, The Moldovans: Romania, Russia, and the Politics of Culture, Hoover Press, Stanford, 2000. ISBN 0-8179-9792-X
- Walter Laqueur, Fascism: Past, Present, Future, Oxford University Press, Oxford etc., 1997. ISBN 0-19-511793-X
- Philip Morgan, Fascism in Europe, 1919–1945, Routledge, London, 2003. ISBN 0-415-16943-7
- David Nicholls, Adolf Hitler: A Biographical Companion, ABC-CLIO, Santa Barbara, 2000. ISBN 0-87436-965-7
- William O. Oldson, A Providential Anti-Semitism. Nationalism and Polity in Nineteenth-Century Romania, American Philosophical Society, Philadelphia, 1991. ISBN 0-87169-193-0
- Z. Ornea, Anii treizeci. Extrema dreaptă românească, Editura Fundației Culturale Române, Bucharest, 1995. ISBN 973-9155-43-X
- Monty Noam Penkower, The Jews Were Expendable: Free World Diplomacy and the Holocaust, Wayne State University Press, Detroit, 1988. ISBN 0-8143-1952-1
- Antony Polonsky, Joanna B. Michlic, introduction to The Neighbors Respond: The Controversy over the Jedwabne Massacre in Poland, Princeton University Press, Princeton, 2004, pp. 1–43. ISBN 0-691-11306-8
- Sabrina P. Ramet, "The Way We Were—And Should Be Again? European Orthodox Churches and the 'Idyllic Past' ", in Timothy A. Byrnes, Peter J. Katzenstein (eds.), Religion in an Expanding Europe, Cambridge University Press, Cambridge, 2006. ISBN 0-521-85926-3
- Steven D. Roper, Romania: The Unfinished Revolution, Routledge, London, 2000. ISBN 90-5823-027-9
- Michael Shafir, "The Mind of Romania's Radical Right", in Sabrina P. Ramet (ed.), The Radical Right in Central and Eastern Europe since 1989, Penn State University Press, University Park, 1999, pp. 213–232. ISBN 0-271-01811-9
- Thomas, Martin. "To arm an ally: French arms sales to Romania, 1926–1940." Journal of Strategic Studies 19.2 (1996): 231–259.
- Ottmar Trașcă, "Ocuparea orașului Odessa de căre armata română și măsurile adoptate față de populația evreiască" Archived 15 September 2018 at the Wayback Machine, in the Romanian Academy George Bariț Institute of History's Historica Yearbook 2008, pp. 377–425
- Francisco Veiga, Istoria Gărzii de Fier, 1919–1941: Mistica ultranaționalismului, Humanitas, Bucharest, 1993. ISBN 973-28-0392-4
- Watts, Larry L. Romanian Cassandra: Ion Antonescu and the Struggle for Reform, 1916–1941 (East European Monographs, 1993)
- Petru Weber, "Die Wahrnehmung des »Domestic Holocaust« im Rumänien der Nachkriegsjahre", in Regina Fritz, Carola Sachse, Edgar Wolfrum (eds.), Nationen und ihre Selbstbilder. Postdiktatorische Gesellschaften in Europa, Wallstein Verlag, Göttingen, 2008, pp. 150–167. ISBN 978-3-8353-0212-9
- Gerhard L. Weinberg, Germany, Hitler, and World War II: Essays in Modern German and World History, Cambridge University Press, Cambridge, 1996. ISBN 0-521-56626-6

=== Historiography and memory ===
- Chioveanu, Mihai. "A Deadlock Of Memory The Myth And Cult Of Ion Antonescu In Post-Communist Romania." Studia Hebraica 3 (2003): 102–123.
- Treptow, Kurt W. Romania and World War II ( Center for Romanian Studies, 1996).
- White, George W. Nationalism and Territory. Constructing Group Identity in Southeastern Europe, Rowman & Littlefield, Lanham, 2000. ISBN 0-8476-9809-2

Political offices
Preceded by Ion Gigurtu	Prime Minister of Romania; 5 September 1940 – 23 August 1944	Succeeded by Constantin Sănătescu
Honorary titles
Recreated Title last held by Carol II	Conducător of Romania; 6 September 1940 – 23 August 1944	Vacant Title next held by Nicolae Ceaușescu
