= Constantin Pantazi =

Romanian army general and politician

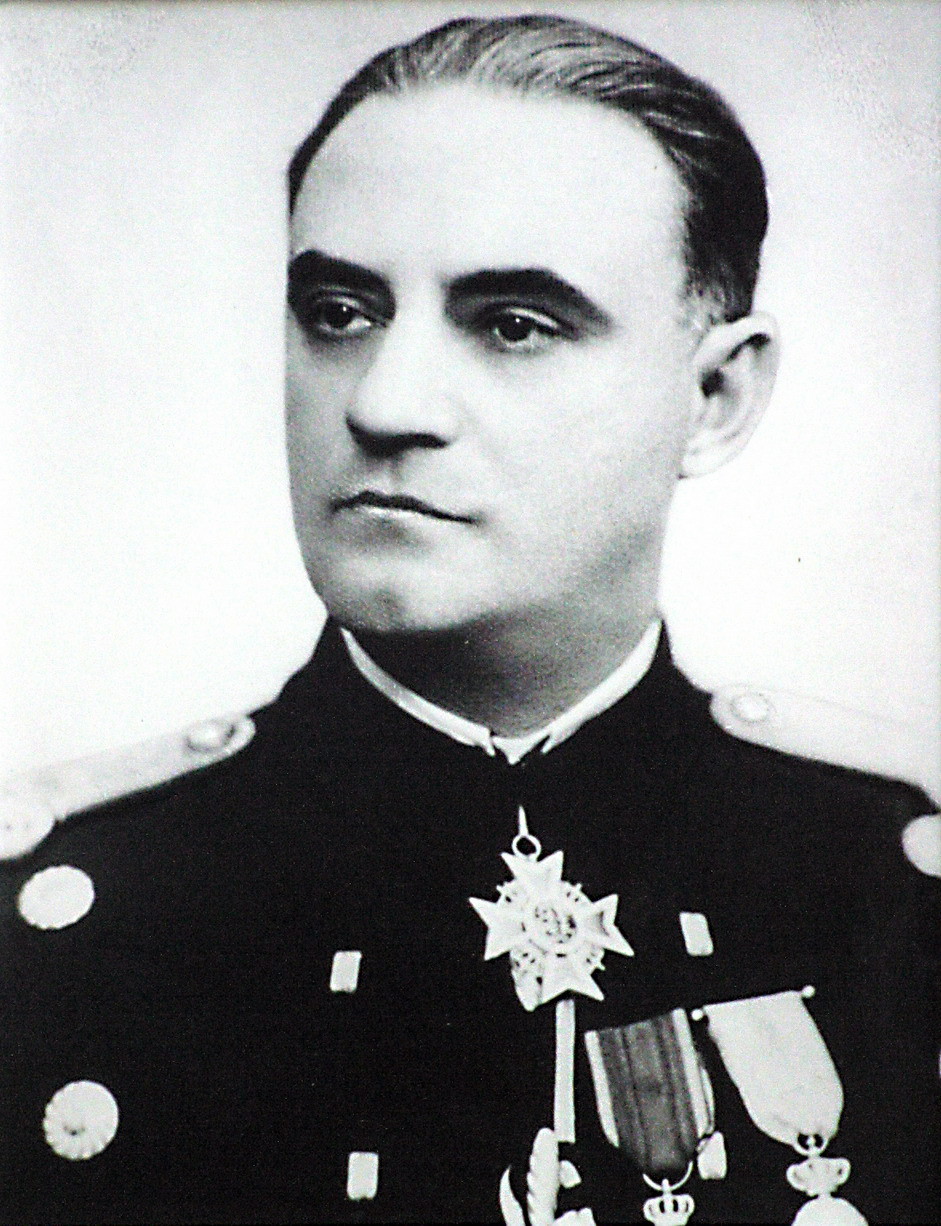

Minister of War of Romania
- In office 23 January 1942 – 23 August 1944
- Prime Minister: Ion Antonescu
- Preceded by: Ion Antonescu
- Succeeded by: Ioan-Mihai Racoviță

Personal details
- Born: August 26, 1888 Călărași, Kingdom of Romania
- Died: January 23, 1958 (aged 69) Râmnicu Sărat Prison, Socialist Republic of Romania

Military service
- Allegiance: Kingdom of Romania
- Branch/service: Romanian Land Forces
- Rank: General
- Battles/wars: World War II

Constantin Pantazi (August 26, 1888, Călărași - January 23, 1958, Râmnicu Sărat) was a Romanian army general and a politician who served as Minister of War between January 23, 1942, and August 23, 1944. He was one of the most faithful followers of Romanian ruler Ion Antonescu. He was found guilty for war crimes and sentenced to death, which was commuted to life imprisonment.

== Biography ==
He distinguished himself in the Third Battle of Oituz in 1917, and was decorated with the Order of Michael the Brave, class III, for the way he led his company from the Mountaineer Regiment.

"For the courage and momentum with which in the battle of August 6–8, 1917 he led the 1st line of the battalion, in the attack on the enemy position at Cireșoaia, and in the battles of 27-29 he personally led the operation of cutting the enemy lines, from a mask that was only 15 paces from the webs.” High Decree no. 1191 of October 16, 1917 On June 8, 1940, he was promoted to the rank of division general.

Having become Leader of the Romanian State in the National Legionary State, Ion Antonescu appointed Pantazi on September 7, 1940, as undersecretary of state at the Ministry of War and reconfirmed on September 14, 1940, as undersecretary of state at the Department of National Defense, for the Army.

On September 22, 1941, after the death in an accident of gen. Alexandru Ioanițiu, gen. of army corps adjutant Iosif Iacobici was released from the position of Minister of War and appointed head of the Great Staff and the Great Headquarters of the operations troops. The leadership of the Ministry of National Defense was taken over on an interim basis on the same day by Marshal Antonescu, who delegated to Major General Constantin Pantazi, Undersecretary of State at the Department of National Defense for the Dry Army, the leadership of the ministry and the plenipotentiary powers to sign "all decrees regarding the appointments of persons, as well as those regarding urgent matters" throughout his absence.

On January 22, 1942, Pantazi was appointed Minister Secretary of State for National Defense.

Pantazi was arrested on August 23, 1944, tried in the "Antonescu group" and ex-officio placed in the retreat position, together with Marshal Antonescu and other high-ranking military commanders of the Antonescu regime, who were accused that "through their activity in the functions or commands they had, supported the political-military leadership of Marshal Ion Antonescu, thus contributing to the disaster of the Army", by decree no. 312 of February 6, 1945. In 1946, the Romanian People's Tribunals in Bucharest sentenced him to death for war crimes. Prime Minister Petru Groza commuted his death sentence to penal labour for life, while Pantazi was being led to the place of execution. Prime Minister Groza and Minister of Justice Lucrețiu Pătrășcanu signed the decree on June 1, 1946, and submitted it to King Michael I for countersignature.

Constantin Pantazi died in 1958 at the Râmnicu Sărat Prison.
