= Săvulescu =

Săvulescu is a Romanian surname that may refer to:

- Alexandru Săvulescu (architect)
- Alexandru Săvulescu (footballer)
- Alice Săvulescu, Romanian botanist
- Julian Savulescu, Australian philosopher and bioethicist
- Traian Săvulescu, Romanian biologist and botanist
