= Nicolae Ciupercă =

Romanian general

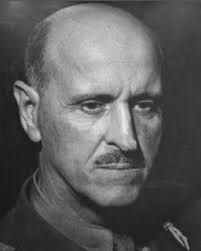
- Nicolae Ciupercă
- Born: 20 April 1882; Râmnicu Sărat, Buzău County, Kingdom of Romania
- Died: 25 May 1950 (aged 68); Văcărești Prison, Bucharest, Romanian People's Republic
- Education: Infantry and Cavalry Officer School; École militaire
- Military career
- Allegiance: Kingdom of Romania
- Branch: Romanian Land Forces
- Service years: 1902–1941
- Rank: Sublocotenent (1902); Prim Locotenent (1907); Căpitan (1911); Major (1916); Locotenent Colonel (1917); Colonel (1920); General de Brigadă (1930); General de Divizie (1936); General de Corp de Armată (1940)
- Commands: Second Army; Fourth Army
- Conflicts: Second Balkan War; World War I; Battle of Mărăști; Hungarian–Romanian War; World War II; Soviet occupation of Bessarabia and northern Bukovina; Operation München; Siege of Odessa
- Awards: Order of Michael the Brave, 3rd Class; Order of the Crown (Romania), Grand Cross Class; Order of the Star of Romania, Knight rank; Croix de Guerre
- Other work: Anti-communist resistance leader (1946–48)

59th Minister of Defense
- In office 14 October 1938 – 31 January 1939
- Prime Minister: Miron Cristea
- Preceded by: Gheorghe Argeșanu
- Succeeded by: Armand Călinescu

Nicolae Ciupercă (20 April 1882 – 25 May 1950) was a Romanian general, born in Râmnicu Sărat. He served during World War I and World War II under the command of Alexandru Averescu and then Ion Antonescu, but would retire from a military life in 1941 over strategy disagreements with Antonescu. He also served as Minister of National Defense in 1938–1939.

== Early life ==
Ciupercă was born in April 1882 in Râmnicu Sărat, Buzău County, located in the northeastern part of the historical region of Muntenia. After graduating in 1900 from the local high school, he attended the Infantry and Cavalry Officer School in Bucharest and graduated in 1902 first in his class, with the rank of second lieutenant. After being promoted to lieutenant (1907) and captain (1911), he graduated in 1913 from the École militaire in Paris. That year, Ciupercă participated in the Second Balkan War as commanding officer of a company.

After Romania entered World War I on the side of the Allies in 1916, Ciupercă was promoted to the rank of major and served with the Romanian Second Army, under the command of General Alexandru Averescu. In May 1917 he was awarded the Order of the Crown of Romania, Officer class. For his role in the Battle of Mărăști later that year, he was awarded the Order of the Star of Romania, Knight rank and the Croix de Guerre and he rose in rank to lieutenant colonel.

For his actions during the Hungarian–Romanian War he was promoted to colonel in 1920. In October 1930 he was promoted to brigadier general and in October 1937 he advanced to major general. He held multiple commands during this time; notably, from 1937 to 1938 he was commanding officer of the 3rd Army Corps and from 1939 to 1940 commanding officer of the 2nd Army. In June 1940 he was promoted to lieutenant general and was put in command of the Romanian Fourth Army.

== Political life ==
Ciupercă served as the Romanian Minister of Defense from 1938 to 1939 under the Second Cristea cabinet. He was a devout anti-communist and would be known for harsh purges of suspected communists within the Romanian Army. He would resign from the position after coming into conflict with King Carol II due to a proposal to decrease the budget of the Romanian military. He would later go on to claim this to be an action of corruption by Carol, as the king refused to explain to the general where the missing funds would go. Despite his claims, it was impossible to ratify the claim, and it was passed off as rumor.

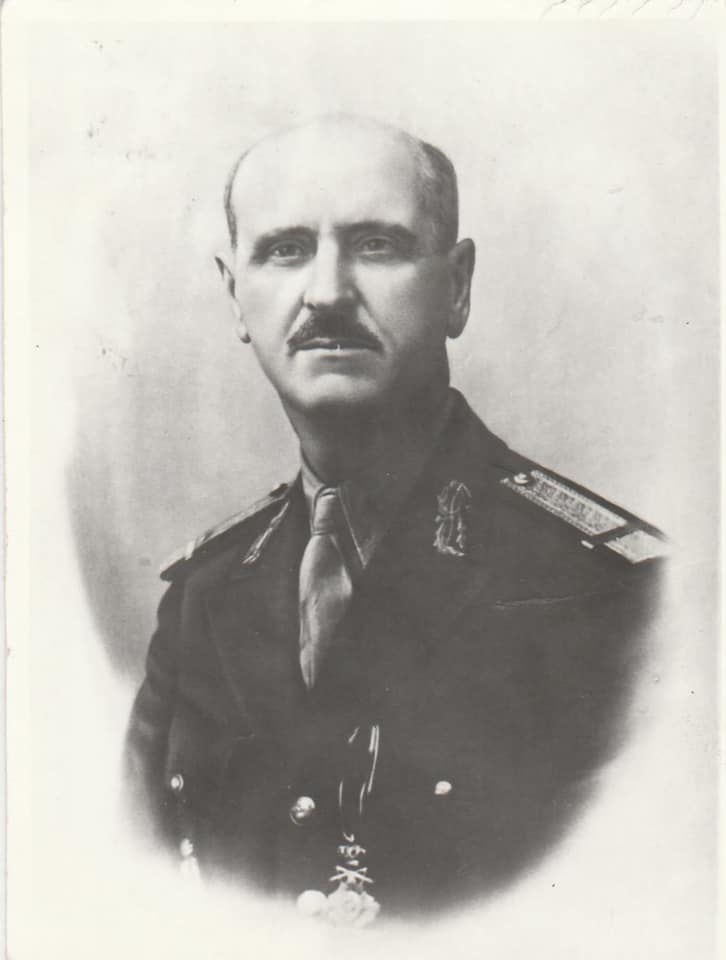
Ciupercă during the Second Cristea cabinet

== Soviet Occupation of Bessarabia and northern Bukovina ==
On June 26, 1940, the Soviet Union demanded that the regions of northern Bukovina and Bessarabia be evacuated of all Romanian military personnel and civilian administration, and that the territories be ceded to the USSR. Due to overwhelming international pressure, the Romanian government was forced to accept the ultimatum, and the Soviet occupation of Bessarabia and Northern Bukovina commenced on June 28.

The Fourth Army under General Ciupercă was stationed along the Soviet border with Romania, and thus he was placed in charge of the evacuation of military and civilian assets in the region. Despite the withdrawal of Romanian troops, there were a number of skirmishes in the region which the general tried to avoid at all costs. Due to this choice, not all military assets could be evacuated in time and the Soviet troops seized large numbers of weapons from the Romanian Military. The Soviet troops also seized the Hertsa region, which had not been agreed to by the Romanian government. A number of clashes broke out in the region between the Soviet and Romanian troops, however General Ciupercă was able to evacuate all military assets from the area with little loss of life.

== Operation München ==
General Ciupercă was still under command of the 4th Army when Romania joined Operation Barbarossa on 22 June 1941 in order to reclaim the lost territories of Bessarabia and Bukovina. Operation München was the codename used for a joint Romanian-German invasion of the Soviet Union through Romanian territory. General Ciupercă had under his command 127,625 military, of which 4,321 were officers and 3,371 non-commissioned officers. He and the Fourth Army were tasked with reclaiming the town of Țiganca in Southern Bessarabia. Due to heavy Soviet counterattacks, the 4th Army's 3rd Corps was repulsed from the bridgehead that they had attempted to form across the Prut River. The 4th Army's 4th Corps was able to create a bridgehead north of the town however, and relieved the pressure on the 3rd Corps. General Ciupercă managed to secure the bridgehead, and the town itself hours after. The 4th Army would follow the retreating Soviet forces to the Dniester River, only fighting in minor engagements along the way.

== The Siege of Odessa ==
When Adolf Hitler convinced Romanian Conducător Ion Antonescu to cross the Dniester River, Ciupercă was still in command of the 4th Army. The Romanian 4th Army advanced along the coast of the Black Sea until it reached the outskirts of the Soviet city of Odessa. The city was encircled by elements of the Romanian 4th Army and the German 11th Army, and due to heavy resistance from Soviet forces trapped inside of the city, the Romanian and German armies decided to lay siege to Odessa. The Romanian 4th Army engaged in this siege 339,223 troops, of which 12,049 were officers and 9,845 were non-commissioned officers. Ciupercă was charged with the defense of the outskirts of the city, while the main army under generals Antonescu, Iosif Iacobici, and Alexandru Ioanițiu † pushed deeper into the city. During a staff meeting with the command, Ciupercă got into a dispute with general Antonescu and the General Staff over the tactics which would be used in the assault on the city. Antonescu and the General Staff favored an attack from multiple directions, and a general advance of troops on the front; Ciupercă favored a spearhead movement however, an attempt to shatter Soviet lines before they'd have a chance to organize a serious resistance. This dispute would lead to Antonescu dismissing Ciupercă from his position, and for him to be replaced by general Ioan Glogojeanu and general Iacobici. Ciupercă retired on 13 October, moving back to his hometown of Râmnicu Sărat. On 17 October, the day after Odessa fell to the Romanian forces, Ciupercă was awarded the Order of Michael the Brave, 3rd class for his leadership of the 4th Army during the period 22 June–9 September.

== Post-War Trial and Conviction ==
After the end of the war, Ciupercă joined the anti-communist Graiul Sângelui organization. Founded in spring 1945 by Ion Vulcănescu, the members of the organization sought to facilitate the actions of American airborne troops which they hoped were to land in Romania (see Vin americanii!). In 1946, Ciupercă was appointed military commander of the organization, under the conspiratorial name "General Cioantă", and Colonel Ion Gradin was appointed Chief of Staff. Starting in March 1948, the members of the Prahova Valley group were led by major Constantin Latea, and the groups from Caracal, Orșova, and Banat were led by General Grigore Moșteoiu. The US landing troops were to be launched around Bucharest, in the Prahova Valley, and in the valleys of the Someș and Mureș rivers in Transylvania. The activities of Graiul Sângelui were noted by the Securitate, and in the fall of 1948 some of its members were arrested. Ciupercă opposed proposals to disband the organization, reportedly saying, "we will go to prison so it will be known that we did not want Romania to become a republic of the Soviet Union".

Due to these activities and to his association with the Romanian invasion of the Soviet Union, on 12 September 1948, the retired general was arrested and tried by the Bucharest People's Tribunal. He was sentenced to 12 years in prison for conspiring against the Romanian People's Republic and conspiring against the social order. On 31 December 1948 he was incarcerated in Jilava Prison, where he was severely beaten. From there, he was transferred to Văcărești Prison in the southern outskirts of Bucharest. Due to failing health, Ciupercă was admitted to the medical wing of the prison, where he died on 25 May 1950, being ill with cerebral atherosclerosis, Parkinson's disease, myocarditis, and azotemia.

In 2019, a street in Buzău was named after General Ciupercă, while in 2020, a street in Râmnicu Sărat was named after him.

== Awards ==
- Order of the Star of Romania, Knight rank – I.D. 437/13.05.1917.
- Order of the Crown of Romania, Officer class – I.D. 846/9.08.1917.
- Croix de Guerre – brevet 834/13.02.1918.
- Order of Saint Anna, 2nd class – brevet 11360/29.08.1917.
- Order of Polonia Restituta, Commander class – brevet 66928/19.12.1924.
- Order of the Star of Romania, Commander rank – I.D. 20/1335/9.05.1934.
- Order of the Crown of Romania, Grand Cross class – 8 June 1940.
- Order of Michael the Brave, 3rd Class – 17 October 1941.
- Order of the Crown of Romania, Grand Cross class – I.D. 2168/29.07.1942.
