= Gheorghe Buzatu =

Romanian far-right historian and politician

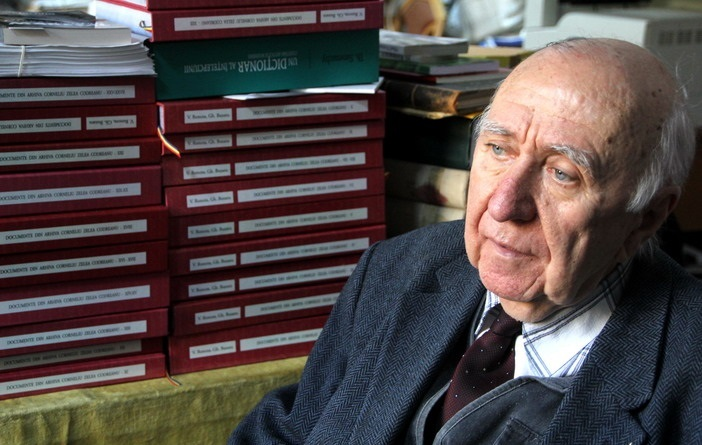
Buzatu in 2012

Gheorghe Buzatu (6 June 1939 – 20 May 2013) was a Romanian historian, politician, and professor of history at the University of Iași. Elected to the Romanian Senate for Iași County in 2000 on the lists of the nationalist party Greater Romania Party, he served as a vice president of that body over the next four years. He is best known for his controversial publications about the Jews and the Holocaust in Romania during World War II.

== Biography ==
Born in Sihlea, Vrancea County, Buzatu finished elementary and high school in the city of Râmnicu Sărat and later studied history and linguistics at the University of Iași. In 1971, he received his PhD in history. Between 1961 and 1992, he worked as a researcher at the Iași institute for archeology and history and was the chief researcher in the Center for History and European studies of the Romanian Academy. In 1992, he became the director of this center.

=== Publications ===
Buzatu published 25 books and was involved in the writing of several others. One of his best-known works is the book Românii în arhivele Kremlinului (Romanians in the Kremlin's archives), published in 1996. The book's chief thesis is that the Jews were responsible for the mass suffering and massacre of Romanians by the communist regime. A chapter in the book, " Aşa a început Holocaustul împotriva poporului român" (Thus began the Holocaust against the Romanian people) was published in 1995 as a brochure by the extreme right group "The Legionnaires". In this chapter, Buzatu claimed that the Jews have the main responsibility for the Holocaust of the Romanian people which began in 1940 with the Soviet occupation of Bessarabia and Northern Bukovina. In July 2001, Buzatu organized a Symposium on the subject of the Holocaust of the Jews in Romania. This symposium, titled "Holocaust în România?", mainly questioned the existence of the Holocaust of the Jewish people in Romania and the responsibility of the Romanian government for the mass murders committed on Romanian-controlled territories taken from the Soviet Union in 1941. After the symposium, Buzatu established "Liga pentru Combaterea Antiromânismului" (the league against anti-Romanianism) with himself as president.

Holocaust historian Randolph Braham described Buzatu as a "Holocaust denier historian and an expert in manipulating public opinion".

=== Political career ===
Between 2000 and 2004, Buzatu represented Iași County in the Romanian Senate. In 2002, after parliament passed a law forbidding Holocaust denial, Buzatu offered to change the definition of "Holocaust". According to the proposal, the definition should be "a mass organized annihilation of Jewish population in Europe, committed by the Nazi authorities". Thus, Buzatu's proposal would have said there was no Holocaust in Romania because Nazi Germany did not directly rule Romania during the war.

In 2004, Buzatu was awarded the Order of the Star of Romania by president Ion Iliescu.

Buzatu died in 2013.

== See also ==
- Historical revisionism
- Holocaust denial
