= Ilie Șteflea =

Romanian general

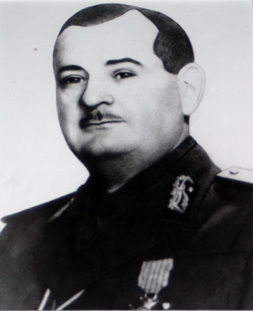
- Lieutenant-General Ilie Șteflea
- Born: April 11, 1888; Szelistye, Austria-Hungary (now Săliște, Romania)
- Died: May 21, 1946 (aged 58); Bucharest, Kingdom of Romania
- Military career
- Allegiance: Romanian Army
- Branch: Infantry
- Service years: 1909–1944
- Rank: General de corp de armată
- Conflicts: World War I; Romanian Campaign; World War II
- Awards: Order of the Crown, Knight class Order of Michael the Brave, 3rd class Order of the Star of Romania, Commander class Iron Cross, 1st and 2nd class

Chief of the Romanian General Staff
- In office 20 January 1942 – 23 August 1944
- Monarch: Michael I
- Prime Minister: Ion Antonescu
- Preceded by: Iosif Iacobici
- Succeeded by: Gheorghe Mihail

Ilie Șteflea (11 April 1888 – 21 May 1946) was a Romanian General during World War II and Chief of the Romanian General Staff between 20 January 1942 and 23 August 1944.

== Early life and career ==
Ilie Șteflea was born in Săliște (near Sibiu, in Transylvania, at the time part of Austria-Hungary). Economic hardships forced his family to move to the Kingdom of Romania, to the newly acquired province of Northern Dobruja.

Șteflea attended primary school at Medgidia, and secondary schools at Constanța and at the Gheorghe Lazăr High School in Bucharest. He started his studies at the Military School for Infantry Officers in September 1907, graduating first in his class in 1909. He was promoted to the rank of Sublocotenent (second lieutenant) and assigned to the 34th Infantry Regiment, based in Constanța.

Promoted to Lieutenant in 1912, he was sent in October 1915 by Colonel Radu R. Rosetti on an information-gathering mission in Transylvania. Șteflea's cover name as a spy was Alexandru Ștefănescu, and he was supposed to be a teacher. He crossed the border and went to Predeal, ostensibly for health reasons, and then on to the Timiș Valley and Brașov to buy an overcoat, but in reality he was scoping out possible attack routes for a Romanian incursion into Austria-Hungary.

After Romania entered World War I in August 1916, Șteflea was given the command of a machine gun company in the 34th Infantry Regiment, holding the rank of captain. On 8 September [O.S. 26 August] 1916 he was wounded at Daidâr (now Shumentsi, Tutrakan Municipality) during the Battle of Turtucaia and evacuated to Moldavia.

On 1 April 1917 he was assigned as instructor to the Military School for Infantry Officers in Botoșani, where he taught infantry tactics inspired by the French military doctrine and his war experience. That year he advanced in rank to major. After the war, Șteflea attended the Higher War School, graduating in 1920. After a training period at the General Staff, he returned to teach at the military academy. In 1925 he pursued his training in France, and was promoted to lieutenant colonel, advancing in rank to colonel in 1930 and brigadier general in 1938.

== World War II ==
After the defeat of the Legionnaires' Rebellion in January 1941, he was appointed commander of the 3rd Infantry Division, with which he participated alongside German troops in the Siege of Odessa in the fall of 1941. He was promoted to major general in January 1942 and then to lieutenant general in January 1944. On 20 January 1942 he was appointed Chief of the Romanian General Staff, a position he occupied until the fall of the Ion Antonescu regime on 23 August 1944, as a result of King Michael's Coup. On that date, Șteflea was temporary placed in command of the 4th Army (23–31 August 1944).

In September, he was relieved of command and then arrested on 11 October 1944, because of his close cooperation with Antonescu. Due to ill health, Șteflea was put under house arrest. His doctor recommended treatment for his heart condition at a health spa, but the request was denied by Alexandru Bârlădeanu. He died at home on 21 May 1946. A month after his death, the Bucharest People's Tribunal ordered the closure of Șteflea's file.

The Sibiu County branch of the National Association of Reserve and Retired Military Personnel is now named after him.

== Awards and decorations ==
| Award or decoration | Country | Date | Ref |
|---|---|---|---|
| Order of the Crown (with swords and Military Virtue ribbon) | Romania | | |
| Order of the Star of Romania (Commander class, with swords and Military Virtue ribbon) | Romania | | |
| Order of Michael the Brave (3rd class) | Romania | 17 November 1941 | |
| Order of Aeronautical Virtue (with swords, Golden Cross class) | Romania | | |
| Iron Cross (2nd class) | Germany | 12 October 1941 | |
| Iron Cross (1st class) | Germany | 26 March 1942 | |
| Maritime Virtue Order (1st, 2nd and 3rd class) | Romania | | |
