= Adrian Oțoiu =

Romanian novelist, essayist and translator

Adrian Oțoiu (Romanian pronunciation: [adriˈan oˈt͡soju]) is a novelist, essayist and translator.

He was born on the 30th of April, 1958 in Râmnicu Sărat, in southeastern Romania. As his father was an aviation pilot, he spent his childhood in the company of airplanes.

After studying at the Arts High School in Baia Mare, Oțoiu earned a degree in Romanian and English from the University of Baia Mare in 1981. In 2001 was awarded a PhD in philology from Babeș-Bolyai University in Cluj-Napoca, with a dissertation on the Romanian generation of postmodern fiction writers of the 1980s, under the supervision of Ion Pop.

Oțoiu is currently an Associate Professor (reader) at the Faculty of Letters of Northern University of Baia Mare. He directed a postgraduate summer course at Central European University in Budapest. He has also taught at the University of Limerick, University of New Mexico, and Carson–Newman University.

Oțoiu is a member of the Writers' Union of Romania and of the European Society for the Study of English.

== Publications ==
=== Fiction ===
Oțoiu made his debut in 1986 with the massive novel The heart of the Matter or Dancing with the Flayed (Coaja lucrurilor sau Dansând cu Jupuita) (Cartea Româneasca publishers; second edition: Paralela 45, 2002). This was the first Romanian book to have been awarded both The Debut Award of the Writers' Union of Romania (USR) and the Book of the Year Award of the rival Association of Professional Writers of Romania (ASPRO). Previously it had been awarded the "Mașina de scris" award granted to the year's best unpublished manuscript. The novel was compared by critics to James Joyce's Ulysses.

Two volumes of short stories followed, which consisted of hyperlinked pieces that emulated the outlook of a computer guide, which made critics speak of these making up a "hypertextual novel". These two volumes share characters and settings and a subtitle (Literature handbook for computer nerds): Hot Keys for Soft Windows (Chei fierbinți pentru ferestre moi) (Paralela 45, 1998) and Enormities and Left-handed Stuff (Stângăcii și enormități) (Paralela 45, 1999).

The short story Tip of the Day: Shakespeare and Computers was published in the author's English translation in the issue of October 2004 of the American magazine Words without Borders, which was dedicated to Romanian literature. The same short story was published in the anthology Romanian Fiction of the 80s and 90s (Paralela 45, 1998).

Another short story, Reveal codes: Mr Onoriu's Profession appeared in Hungarian translation in the anthology of Romanian contemporary fiction Tizenegy kortárs román prózaíró (Literator, 2005).

=== Literary criticism ===
Frontier traffic: The Prose of the Generation of the Eighties (Trafic de frontieră. Proza generației 80) (Paralela 45, 2000)

The Forked Eye and the Squinting Tongue (Ochiul bifurcat, limba sașie. Proza generației 80), Vol II (Paralela 45, 2003).

=== Translation ===
Under the title La Doi Lebădoi, Oțoiu translated into Romanian the famous novel At Swim-Two-Birds by the Irish modernist Flann O'Brien (Paralela 45, 2005). The translation is furthered by a consistent introduction and numerous footnotes.

Oțoiu's translations into English include the cultural tourist guidebook Tourism in Maramureș (Cert-Phare, 1998) and the manual for foreign investors, Modern Elements of Entrepreneurial Training ICTWAY 2003 (Editura Fundatiei CDIMM, 2003).

Written at Salzburg Seminar in Austria, Oțoiu's chapter The seven POEs was part of the collective writing experiment Naked Went the Novelist(1998).

=== English literature and cultural studies ===
Oțoiu has authored numerous articles on British and Irish literature and their interferences with Romanian culture. Some of these have been included in the volume Under Eastern Eyes: Cross-cultural Refractions (Timișoara: Marineasa, 2003).

He has contributed with a chapter entitled Automobile Metempsychoses in the Land of Dracula to the volume Autopia: Cars and Culture, edited by Peter Wollen and Joe Kerr (London: Reaktion Books, 2002).

He has synthesized the evolution of the Romanian reception of James Joyce's work in the chapter 'Le sens du pousser': On the Spiral of Joyce's Reception in Romania in the massive study The Reception of James Joyce in Europe, edited by Geert Lernout and Wim Van Mierlo (London: Thoemmes Continuum, 2004).

A comparative study paralleling the situation of postcommunist culture in Romania with postcolonial contexts elsewhere—called An Exercise in Fictional Liminality: Postcolonialism, Postcommunism, and Romania's Threshold Generation was published in the Chicago-based Comparative Studies of South Asia, Africa and the Middle East.

Oțoiu also wrote prefaces to John Barth's second Romanian edition of The Floating Opera and to Flann O'Brien's first Romanian edition of At Swim-Two-Birds.

== Honors and awards ==
Oțoiu's debut book reaped three national awards, including the debut award of the Writers' Union for 1986 and the debut award of the Association of Professional Writers of Romania (ASPRO) (1996). Most of his subsequent books were shortlisted for the ASPRO award.

In 2003 Oțoiu has received the first Residential Bursary ever granted by Ireland Literature Exchange towards the translation of the novel At Swim-Two-Birds by O'Brien.

Oțoiu has obtained scholarships and grants from institutions from Austria (Salzburg Seminar), Germany (Stuttgart Seminar for Cultural Studies), United States (invited by universities of Delaware, New Mexico and Tennessee), Italy (Trieste Joyce School), Malta, Ireland and UK.

== Interviews ==
- Romanian intellectuals have a sacred horror of emotion (Intelectualii români au o oroare sacră faţă de emoţie), interview taken by Iolanda Malamen in Ziua of 12 July 2005.
- Nothing warm, nothing tactile, nothing erotic (Nimic cald, nimic tactil, nimic erotic), interview taken by Cristian Patrasconiou, in Orizont, no.11, November 2005.
- Fables about perfectionism (Fabule despre perfecţionism) - Part One and Part Two, interview taken by Raluca Alexandrescu, Observator cultural, no. 57–58.
- Who has found the bicycle's black box, or, Romanian literature has yet to emerge from the orphanage (Cine a gãsit cutia neagrã a bicicletei, sau Literatura romanã trebuie sã iasã din orfelinat), replies to an inquiry in Echinox, 3 April 2001, p. 2.

== Reviews ==
- Alex Budac, Skins, carcasses, shells (Coji, carcase, caroserii), Orizont, no. 11, November 2005, p. 4.
- Roxana Din, The democratic books (Cărţile democratice), Echinox, 5 May 2001, p. 2.
- Paul Cernat, The advantages of the frontier (Avantajele frontierei), Observator cultural, no. 63.
- Paul Cernat, Digital fiction, sinistral dystopia (Ficţiune digitală, distopie sinistrală), Observator cultural , no. 8.
- Ioan Curseu, Adrian Oţoiu's Frontier Traffic (Trafic de frontieră), Echinox,, 5 Mai 2001, p. 12.
