= Gheorghe Mihail =

Romanian army officer (1887–1982)

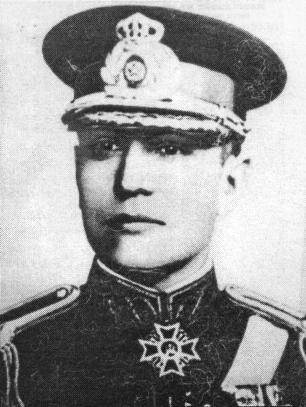
- Gheorghe Mihail
- Born: 13 March 1887; Brăila, Brăila County, Kingdom of Romania
- Died: 31 January 1982 (aged 94); Bucharest, Socialist Republic of Romania
- Burial place: Șețu Cemetery, Sinaia, Romania
- Education: Carol I National Defence University

Chief of the Romanian General Staff
- In office 23 August 1940 – 6 September 1940
- Monarch: Michael I
- Prime Minister: Ion Gigurtu; Ion Antonescu
- Preceded by: Florea Țenescu
- Succeeded by: Alexandru Ioanițiu
- In office 23 August 1944 – 12 October 1944
- Monarch: Michael I
- Prime Minister: Constantin Sănătescu
- Preceded by: Ilie Șteflea
- Succeeded by: Nicolae Rădescu
- Military career
- Allegiance: Kingdom of Romania
- Branch: Army
- Service years: 1905–1945
- Rank: 2nd Lieutenant (1907); 1st Lieutenant (1910); Captain (1913); Major (1917); Colonel (1933); Brigadier General (1935); Major General (1940); Lieutenant General (1944); General (1944)
- Conflicts: Second Balkan War; World War I; Battle of Mărășești; First Battle of the Jiu Valley; Russian Civil War; Intervention in Bessarabia; World War II; 1944 Romanian coup d'état; Second Jassy–Kishinev Offensive
- Awards: Order of Michael the Brave, 3rd Class; Legion of Honor Knight Class; Order of Michael the Brave, 3rd Class, With Swords

Gheorghe Mihail (March 13, 1887 – January 31, 1982) was a Romanian career army officer.

== Early life and career ==
Born in Brăila, he completed primary school in 1902 and passed an examination to enter the school for soldiers' sons in Iași, taking years 7 and 8 there. He attended the military school for active-duty infantry officers between 1905 and 1907. Made a second lieutenant in 1907, he advanced to lieutenant in 1910. In 1911, he won a competition for a specialized training with the Austro-Hungarian Army, enrolling in the seventh infantry division at Esseg for two years. During vacation time, he was able to undertake trips to Berlin, Breslau, Venice, Paris, and Rome, attend maneuvers in Belgium and Switzerland, and spend a month in Egypt during the winter of 1910–1911. After returning home in the summer of 1913, he was mobilized for the Second Balkan War. His infantry regiment did not cross the Danube into Bulgarian territory, but instead guarded the capital Bucharest from Tunari fort. After demobilization, he continued military service at Constanța. In the summer of 1914, he placed first for entering the Higher War School, but was unable due to attend when the school closed due to the outbreak of World War I. However, he was soon named commander of a new school for reserve officers in Constanța. He was promoted to captain in April 1915, and was made commander of another new school in Constanța, for active-duty officers.

== World War I ==
In August 1916, immediately after Romania entered the war, he was sent in reserve to Cocioc outside Bucharest. The following month, his regiment was ordered to the Buzău Mountains. There, he distinguished himself in battle on a hillside; gravely wounded in his left foot, Mihail was transferred to a field hospital in Nehoiu. After five months of recuperation, he was dispatched to his regiment, then on leave near Vaslui. In April 1917, he was advanced to major and made battalion commander. In June, he was sent to the Nămoloasa area, remaining for over a month in the trenches, battle-ready. In mid-July, he received orders to proceed to the theatre of the impending Battle of Mărășești. Mihail's regiment suffered so many losses that it was reorganized as a single battalion under his command. On July 28, he was wounded in the left hip and evacuated to field hospitals in Tecuci, Vaslui and Iași. The following month, he was awarded the Order of Michael the Brave. Although still convalescing, in September he rejoined his comrades, who were on leave near Tecuci. Around Christmas, the battalion was sent to the front in Austrian Bukovina, remaining there until March 1918. In May, the troops were dispatched to the turbulent province of Bessarabia, occupying a stretch along the Dniester river, in the Rezina-Rîbnița area. In the summer of 1918, Mihail was called to Botoșani, where he was placed in command of a students' battalion from the local officers' school. He remained in this position until February 1919, after the end of the war. At that point, he was able to attend the Higher War School, completing its course in 1920, the same year he was made a lieutenant-colonel.

== Interwar Period and World War II ==
During the interwar period, Mihail continued his rise: commander of a Sinaia-based vânători de munte battalion (1922); divisional chief of staff at Sinaia (1925), promoted to colonel and commander of an army group in the same town (1930); infantry regiment commander at Brașov (autumn 1930); regiment commander at Făgăraș (1931); army intelligence section chief (1933); brigadier-general (autumn 1934); staff chief of a military inspectorate (April 1936). From 1937 to 1939, he was chief of the Royal Household for King Carol II and served as director of the National Military Circle. In 1939, he was made division general, commanding the army's Second Corps until 1940. From February to November 1939, he entered the Defense Ministry as a deputy state secretary in four successive governments. He was subsequently made commander of an army corps in Dobruja. From July 4 to August 23, 1940, he was Deputy Prime Minister under Ion Gigurtu. A trusted adviser to the king, he functioned as a sort of Carlist supervisor inside the government. He then served as Chief of the Romanian General Staff from August 23 to September 6. That day, General Ion Antonescu assumed full powers as Conducător, put Mihail on reserve status and placed him under house arrest in Sinaia. During World War II, he developed a relationship of trust with King Michael I.

== End of World War II and Post-War Period ==
Mihail was reactivated on August 23, 1944, the day of Royal coup d'état, and again functioned as Chief of the General Staff from that point until October 12. The same year, he was made army corps general and then army general, also serving as general inspector of the infantry and army. Recalled from duty in August 1946, he was sent into the reserves one year later. In January 1948, the new communist regime arrested Mihail at Sinaia and took him to Bucharest for questioning. Manuscripts found in his home were particularly damning; these included, in the prosecutor's view, "a multitude of phrases containing insults and slanders addressed to the USSR and the Romanian regime". He was charged with sabotage alongside "a group of landowning saboteurs in Ilfov County" and held for two years. He was subsequently accused of "intense activity against the working classes". In January 1957, he was sentenced to twelve years' imprisonment, scheduled to end in 1960. However, he was released that October. Mihail had passed through the prisons at Văcărești, Pitești, Ocnele Mari, Sighet, and Jilava. He settled in Bucharest, where he died nearly a quarter-century later. He is buried at Șețu Cemetery, in Sinaia. A street in Sibiu is named after him.
