= Marius Tigoianu =

Romanian footballer

Personal information
- Full name: Marius Paul Tigoianu
- Date of birth: 22 September 1989 (age 37)
- Place of birth: Râmnicu Sărat, Romania
- Height: 1.78 m (5 ft 10 in)
- Position: Winger

Team information
- Current team: Voința Balta-Albă

Youth career
- 1996–2006: Râmnicu Sărat

Senior career*
Years	Team	Apps	(Gls)
2006–2008	Prefab Modelu	35	(4)
2009–2012	Astra Ploiești	35	(3)
2012–2014	Săgeata Năvodari	44	(9)
2014–2015	Gloria Buzău	18	(2)
2015	Delta Dobrogea Tulcea	?	(?)
2016	Farul Constanța	11	(3)
2016	Unirea Tărlungeni	14	(2)
2017	Recolta Sălcioara	2	(0)
2017	Șirineasa	3	(0)
2019–2021	Râmnicu Sărat	17	(5)
2022–	Voința Balta-Albă	61	(9)
- * Club domestic league appearances and goals as of 14:51, 25 April 2022 (UTC)

Marius Paul Tigoianu (born 22 September 1988) is a Romanian footballer who plays as right winger for Voința Balta-Albă.
