= Alexandru Vlahuță National College =

High school in Romania

Coordinates: 45.3777°N 27.0476°E

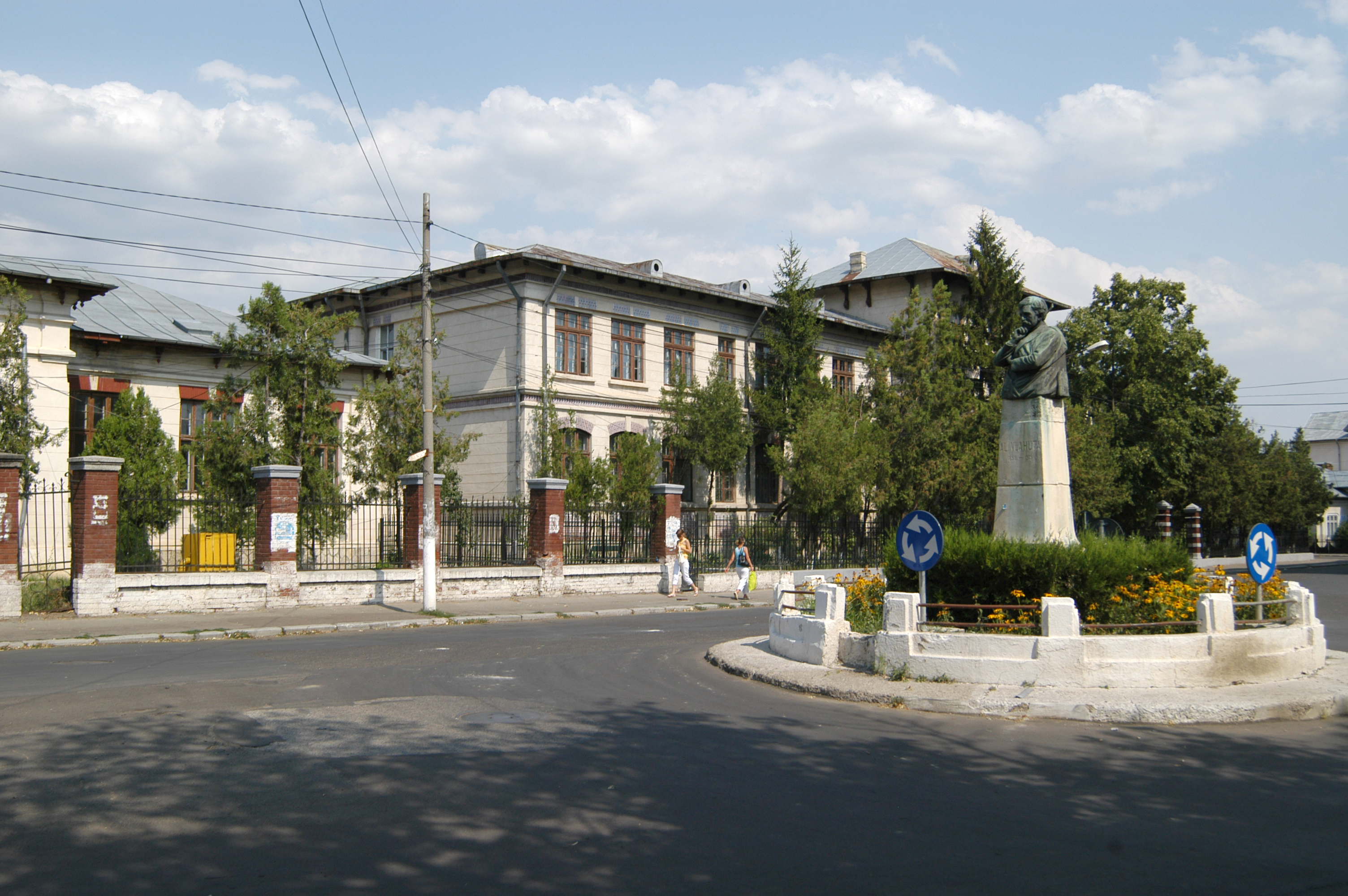
Alexandru Vlahuță National College

Alexandru Vlahuță National College (Romanian: Colegiul Național Alexandru Vlahuță) is a high school located at 13 Tudor Vladimirescu Street, Râmnicu Sărat, Romania.

The school opened as a boys’ gymnasium in September 1889. It initially had a single grade with two teachers, and was located in the former town hall. In 1893, it moved into the current building, which originally had only a ground floor, and was named for Vasile Boerescu, who had donated the land. By that time, there were four grades and eleven teachers. Classes were suspended in 1916, during World War I, when the area was under German occupation. The furniture was destroyed, while the archive and teaching materials were moved to town hall. Classes resumed in 1918; the following year, the institution became King Ferdinand High School. The upper floor was built in 1925-1926; the gymnasium dates to the same period. The interwar years marked a time of increasing prestige for the school.

In 1948, the new communist regime dropped the king’s name. Girls were first admitted the following year. In 1957, the school was dedicated to writer Alexandru Vlahuță. From 1977 to 1990, it featured two specializations: mathematics and physics; and mechanics. The number of pupils rose from 160 during the gymnasium days to 601 in 1922–1923 to 1267 in 1989–1990, including night school attendees. The school was declared a national college in 2000.

The school building is listed as a historic monument by Romania's Ministry of Culture and Religious Affairs.

== Alumni ==
- Gheorghe Buzatu
- Radu Cârneci
- Nicolae Ciupercă
- Octavian Moșescu
- Al. Săndulescu
- Traian Săvulescu
