= Iosif Iacobici =

Romanian general

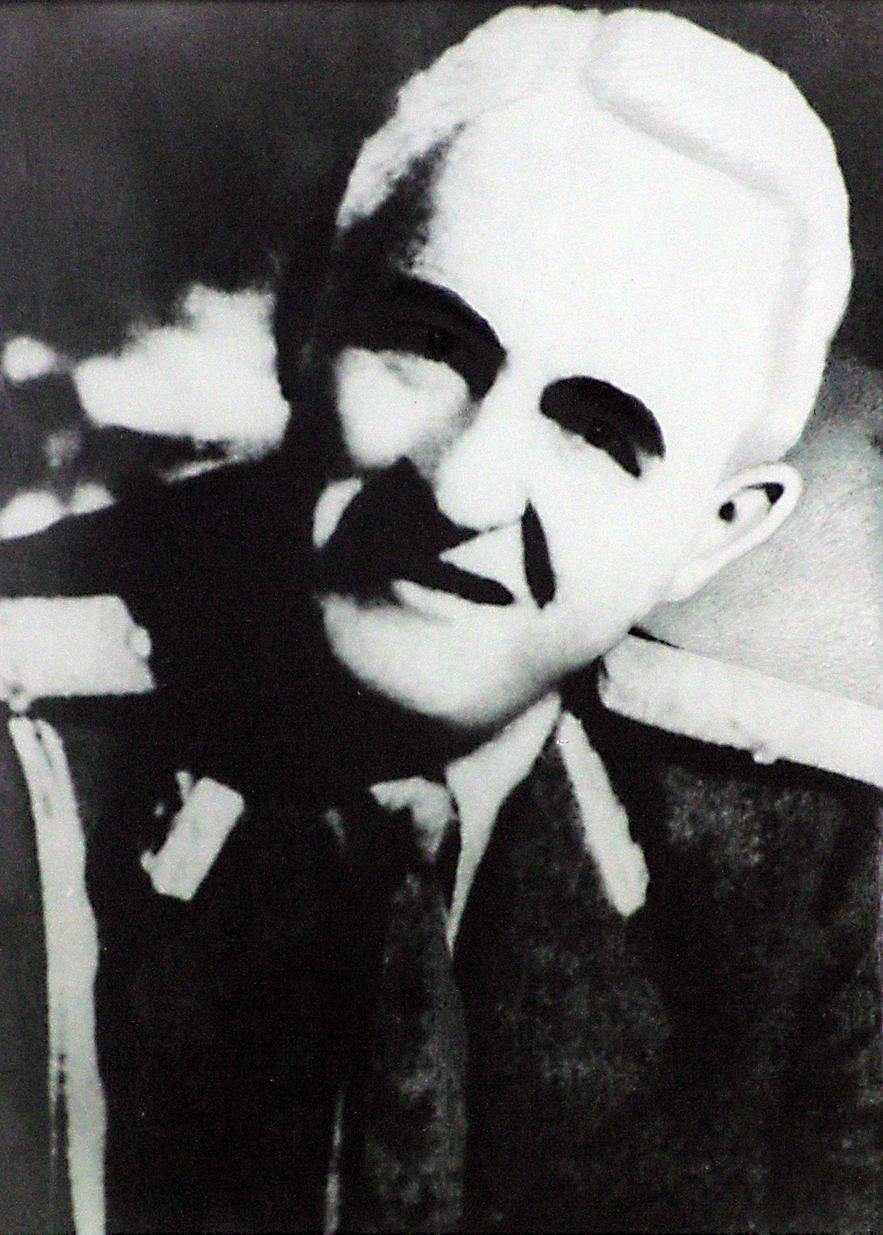

Minister of War of Romania
- In office 27 January 1941 – 22 September 1941
- Preceded by: Ion Antonescu
- Succeeded by: Ion Antonescu

Chief of the Romanian General Staff
- In office 22 September 1941 – 20 January 1942
- Preceded by: Alexandru Ioanițiu
- Succeeded by: Ilie Șteflea

Personal details
- Born: December 8, 1884 Călărași, Kingdom of Romania
- Died: March 11, 1952 (aged 67) Aiud Prison, Aiud, Socialist Republic of Romania
- Education: Kriegsschule, Vienna
- Awards: Order of the Crown of Romania, Grand Cross; Order of Michael the Brave, 3rd class

Military service
- Allegiance: Kingdom of Romania
- Branch/service: Romanian Land Forces
- Rank: Lieutenant general
- Commands: 4th Army
- Battles/wars: World War I; Hungarian–Romanian War; World War II

Iosif Iacobici (December 8, 1884 – March 11, 1952) was a Romanian general, who held the positions of Minister of War and Chief of the General Staff of the Romanian Armed Forces at the beginning of the World War II.

== Biography ==
=== Early life ===
Iosif Iacobici graduated from the military lyceum (infantry cadet school) in Košice (today in Slovakia), the military lyceum (cavalry cadet school) in Mährisch-Weisskirchen (today Hranice na Moravě, Moravia) and the Higher War School in Vienna.

In World War I, Iacobici was appointed, with the rank of captain, in the great general staff of the Austro-Hungarian Army, the operations office. Then he continued his work at the great headquarters of the same army. In December 1918 he was incorporated in the Romanian Army with the rank of lieutenant-colonel. He became chief of staff of the 56th Mountain Brigade and sub-chief of the organization section of the general staff. He participated in the Hungarian–Romanian War, between April and August 1919. In the years 1925–1929, he was a royal aide-de-camp.

After World War I, he was appointed commander of the 3rd Vânători de munte Group, chief of staff at the land army inspectorate, director of higher military education, commander of the 2nd Army Corps, and inspector general of the army. In 1931 he was promoted to the rank of brigadier general, and in 1937 to the rank of division general. General Iacobici also held the position of Minister of Army Endowment (October 15, 1938 – February 1, 1939). In the periods September 23 – October 27, 1939 and September 9, 1940 – November 8, 1941, he was commander of the 4th Army.

He was promoted to the rank of Army corps general effective June 6, 1940. Two days later, he was awarded the Order of the Crown of Romania, Grand Cross class.

=== Minister of War and Chief of the General Staff ===
Four days after the Legionnaires' rebellion, on January 27, 1941, Iacobici (with pro-German political orientation) was appointed Minister of War. He held this position until September 22, 1941, when he succeeded General Alexandru Ioanițiu as Chief of the General Staff. In this capacity, he developed the project of transitioning the army to the peace framework and restoring it after the losses recorded in the first year of the war.

On July 2, 1941, Romania together with Germany launched Operation München, with the primary objective of recapturing Bessarabia and Northern Bukovina, territories that had been occupied by the Soviet Union the year prior. Soon after, Antonescu gave the order to exterminate some of the Jews from Bessarabia and Bukovina and to deport the rest. To carry out this task, he chose the gendarmerie and the army, especially the "praetorate", a military body charged with the temporary administration of a territory. In accordance to that, Iacobici ordered the commander of the Second Section of the General Staff, lieutenant colonel Alexandru Ionescu, to draw up a plan "for the removal of the Jewish element from the Bessarabian territory by organizing and operating teams, which would overtake the Romanian troops". The plan entered effective July 9, 1941. According to Iacobici, "The mission of these teams is to create in the villages an atmosphere unfavorable to the Jewish elements, in such a way that the population alone will seek to remove them by the means they will find more appropriate and adaptable to the circumstances. When the Romanian troops arrive, the atmosphere must already be created and even passed to the facts."

These teams even instigated the Romanian peasants, as many Jewish survivors later testified. The special orders issued by the general staff were presented whenever the civil or military authorities avoided liquidating the Jews for fear of the consequences or because they did not believe in the existence of such orders. On September 9, 1941, after the failure of the attempt of the army led by Nicolae Ciupercă (a general who opposed the continuation of the fighting beyond the Dniester River) to conquer Odessa, Antonescu appointed Iacobici commander of the 4th Army. This was insufficient change, as the forces and means of combat remained unchanged. Consequently, Antonescu asked for the intervention of German bombers and special forces to break the front. The new commander organized a strong attack on the right wing of the army, but could not fully support it with artillery, for lack of sufficient ammunition.

On September 22, 1941, after the death in an accident of general Alexandru Ioanițiu, general of the army corps adjutant Iosif Iacobici was released from the position of minister of national defense and appointed Chief of the General Staff. The leadership of the Ministry of National Defense was taken over on an interim basis on the same day by Marshal Antonescu, who delegated to Major General Constantin Pantazi, Undersecretary of State at the Department of National Defense for the Land Forces, the leadership of the ministry and the plenipotentiary powers to sign all decrees on all the time of his absence. On October 16, 1941, General Iacobici was released from the position of commander of the Fourth Army in light of very high losses suffered by the Fourth Army (August to October 1941), remaining only as chief of the general staff.

On the evening of October 22, 1941, the building of the headquarters of the Romanian troops in Odessa was blown up, killing 16 Romanian officers (including the military commander of the city, General Ioan Glogojeanu), four German naval officers, 46 members of the Romanian armed forces, and many more civilians. Immediately after learning of this disaster, Antonescu ordered Iacobici "to take drastic measures of punishment". That night, Iacobici telegraphed to Antonescu's military cabinet that the ordered action had been initiated: "As reprisals and to set an example to the population, measures were taken to hang a number of suspected Jews and communists in the public squares".

The German Army command offered its services by proposing to send an SS battalion to the site to help "disarm the mines" and clear Odessa of "Jews and Bolsheviks". But the Romanian authorities decided to act alone. Hostages and locals who disobeyed orders were executed, without trial, by hanging from balconies on the main streets. "After the explosion, long lines of Jews were hanged on the electricity poles of the trolleybuses. About 10,000 Jews, already arrested, were put in prison and executed immediately". General Iacobici hastened to send the Military Cabinet a report on the situation, which detailed the repressive actions carried out: "the repression action was carried out inside the city, by shooting and hanging, and the display of placards to warn those who will dare and attempt such terrorism".

On November 14, 1941, Iacobici was awarded the Order of Michael the Brave, 3rd class "for the skill and dexterity with which he led the Army, leading it to the conquest of Odessa".

=== The divergences with Ion Antonescu ===
On the occasion of the visit of the German Field Marshal Wilhelm Keitel to Bucharest, he presented the new battle plan to Antonescu. "But Romania was not, at that time, a state capable of waging a large-scale war at great distances from the country, and, of course, the results were seen". Nevertheless, Antonescu agreed with the new plan to reorient the front to the resources of the Caspian Sea and expressed his commitment to participate with a large number of military personnel. His military commitment exceeded even German expectations. As a reward, Hitler offered Ion Antonescu a luxury car.

On January 2, 1942, Antonescu announced his intention to participate in the spring campaign with a first echelon of ten divisions and a second of 5-6 divisions. This meant that Romania was to deploy all types of troops on the Eastern front, with a total of about half a million soldiers. Learning of this intention, General Iacobici warned, on January 8, 1942, of the consequences and proposed reducing the first echelon to 8 divisions and not sending the second echelon, in order not to give Hitler "a blank slate" and to be able to discuss the issue within the general staff.

Considering it impossible to revert the promise of Romanian military participation in the spring offensive, Iacobici demanded that Romanian participation be as "minimum as possible", according to strategic needs, claiming it is neither expedient nor possible to participate in the spring operations with more than an army worth eight divisions. In support of his request, Iacobici specified the difficulties of supply, the lack of means of transport, deficiencies in endowment and the unpopular nature of the intervention, since the Romanian soldier is not happy to fight far from his country, and the danger represented by Hungary in the conditions in which it maintained its military potential almost intact. Another reason for Iacobici's resistance to participate, was what he saw as the military situation vis-a-vis Hungary, fearing that the youth, whom we want to train thoroughly, will fall on the distant plains of the Soviet Union, in a time when the Romanian Army sorely lacking during the settlement with Hungary. In the perspective of a future war with Hungary for the liberation of Northern Transylvania, the Romanian Army would have been decimated in a useless war and would have reduced its chances.

Antonescu blamed Iacobici of being incapable, blaming him in "gratuitous offense" that he brings to Romania, adding that "it is the mentality of defeatists and those who fish in troubled waters", claiming that the "proof is the outfit of the Romanian soldier on the battlefield and of the wounded in hospitals, who all want to be healed faster so that be sent to the front". General Iacobici's position regarding the sending of Romanian troops to the front beyond the Dniester led to a rapid worsening of relations with Marshal Antonescu. Convinced that he was right, Iacobici returned, on January 16, 1942, with another memorandum, in which he reaffirmed that he did not find it either appropriate or possible to participate in the spring with more than eight divisions.

On January 20, 1942, Iacobici resigned from the position of Chief of the General Staff, following dissension between him and Antonescu. On January 20, 1942, by order no. 19, his resignation request was approved, and General Ilie Șteflea was appointed in his place. On August 4, 1942, Iacobici was transferred to the reserve, three years before the age limit. He felt offended that he was considered ineligible for promotion, being retired with the rank of adjutant general that he had held at the beginning of the war.

=== Post-war ===
Considering himself wronged, Iacobici sought some kind of rehabilitation after the August 23, 1944 Coup, stating that he would immediately retire from the army after he was given "moral satisfaction". Prime Minister Constantin Sănătescu justified in the fall of 1944 his refusal to respond to a request for re-evaluation of Iacobici's case, saying that "He was Minister of War at the outbreak of the war against the Soviet Union. So he will be transferred to the Trial Commission".

On May 18, 1946, the retired general Iacobici was arrested by the Corps of Detectives, but soon after he was released, absolved of any guilt. After a few weeks he was accused of campaigning for Nazism, for starting the war against the Soviet Union. On August 12, 1948, he was detained in preventive detention, then sent to trial in a group with 16 other former dignitaries of the Antonesian government. In 1949 Iacobici was sentenced to eight years of hard prison. He was in detention in Văcărești Prison and Jilava Prison. Iacobici died on March 11, 1952, in Aiud Prison due to contracting pulmonary and bone tuberculosis.

The General Prosecutor of Romania, Sorin Moisescu, requested the Supreme Court of Justice to rehabilitate eight members of the Antonescu government. American congressmen Alfonse D'Amato and Christopher Smith took a position against this request. On behalf of the Commission on Security and Cooperation in Europe (Helsinki Commission), the two Republican senators asked President Emil Constantinescu to intervene to withdraw the annulment appeal, since "the eight" were "members of a government responsible for the persecution of the entire Jewish community from Romania and for the deportation and killing of at least 250,000 Romanian and Ukrainian Jews". D'Amato and Smith pointed out in the appeal that the rehabilitation of the former dignitaries "would call into question the sincerity of Romania's commitments regarding the fundamental Western values and may entail a reconsideration of the support given to Romania's candidacy for integration into the economic and security institutions".

Prosecutor Moisescu reviewed the request submitted to the SCJ, stating that "the collective ministerial responsibility of the Antonescu government cannot be omitted". On October 26, 1998, the Supreme Court of Justice rejected the request to extend the appeal for annulment, formulated by the general prosecutor, Sorin Moisescu, in favor of Iosif Iacobici, and recorded the withdrawal of the appeals for annulment declared in favor of the members of the "Antonescu group", sentenced to between two and ten years of hard prison under the charges of war crimes, subordinating the national economy to fascism and high treason.

In 2006, a street in Sibiu was given the name Strada General Iosif Iacobici. In 2023, following a protest by the Elie Wiesel National Institute for Studying the Holocaust in Romania, the Sibiu City Hall decided to rename the street.
