= Savulescua =

Scientific classification
- Kingdom: Fungi
- Division: Ascomycota
- Class: Dothideomycetes
- Subclass: incertae sedis
- Genus: Savulescua; Petr.

Genus of fungi

Savulescua is a monotypic genus of fungi in the class Dothideomycetes and in the Diaporthales order. It has only one known species, Savulescua insignis Petr. (1959).

The genus was circumscribed by Franz Petrak in Omagiu lui Traian Savulescu vol.591 on page 595 in 1959.

The genus name of Savulescua is in honour of Traian Săvulescu (1889–1963), who was a Romanian biologist, Phytopathologist and botanist. He was founder of the Romanian School of Phytopathology, member and president of the Romanian Academy.
