= Traian Săvulescu =

Romanian biologist and botanist

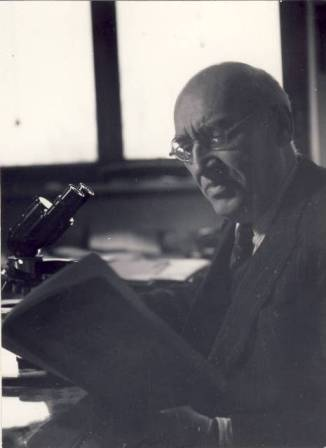
- Born: February 2, 1889; Râmnicu Sărat, Buzău County, Kingdom of Romania
- Died: March 29, 1963 (aged 74); Bucharest, Romanian People's Republic
- Education: University of Bucharest
- Known for: founder of the Romanian School of Phytopathology, member and president of the Romanian Academy
- Spouse(s): Alice Săvulescu

Minister of Agriculture and Royal Domains
- In office 29 November 1946 – 27 December 1947
- Prime Minister: Petru Groza
- Preceded by: Romulus Zăroni

Minister of Agriculture and Royal Domains
- In office 27 December 1947 – 14 April 1948
- Prime Minister: Petru Groza
- Succeeded by: Vasile Vaida

Second Vice President of the Council of Ministers
- In office 15 April 1948 – 16 April 1949
- Prime Minister: Petru Groza
- Scientific career
- Fields: Biology, Botany, Mycology
- Workplaces: University of Bucharest
- Thesis: Studiul asupra speciilor de Campanula L. din secția Heterophyllae ce cresc în România (1916)
- Author abbrev. (botany): Săvul.

Traian Săvulescu (2 February 1889, Râmnicu Sărat – 29 March 1963, Bucharest) was a Romanian biologist and botanist, founder of the Romanian School of Phytopathology, member and president of the Romanian Academy.

== Early life and education ==
The third child of Petrache and Maria Săvulescu, he attended primary school and secondary school in Râmnicu Sărat and the Costache Negruzzi College in Iași, where his teacher, Teodor Nicolau, directed him towards the study of botany.

After graduation in 1907, he enrolled at the Faculty of Medicine in Bucharest. The next year, he enrolled at the University of Bucharest, Faculty of Natural Sciences, from which he graduated in 1912. After graduation, he embarked on a Ph.D. at the Botanical Institute in Bucharest, which he obtained in 1916 with a doctoral thesis entitled Studiul asupra speciilor de Campanula L. din secția Heterophyllae ce cresc în România (Study of the species of Campanula L. in the Heterophyllae growing in Romania). The work was well received and noted with magna cum laude. Săvulescu became the first doctor of botany at the University of Bucharest.

== Career ==
Between 1912 and 1921 he worked at the Botanical Institute of Cotroceni and in 1918 he was appointed lecturer in the Department of Plant Morphology and Institute of Systematic Botany in Bucharest. For a quarter of a century, he divided his work between the College of Agriculture at Herăstrău Park, where he taught Systematics and Phytopathology, and the Plant and the Agricultural Research Institute of Romania, founded by Gheorghe Ionescu-Sisești.

He organized a network of warning stations across Romania to combat vine mildew. In 1929 he founded a laboratory for the study of insecticide-fungicide substances, the laboratory subsequently becoming the national Plant Protection Service. He also initiated the first phytosanitation laws and quarantine control in Romania.

In 1928 he founded the academic journal Starea fitosanitară a României (Phytosanitary status of Romania), published annually, which covered matters of plant protection.. In the same year he started the famous exsiccata Herbarium mycologicum Romanicum which he issued until 1963. In 1967 the work was continued by V. Bontea, O. Constantinescu and G. Negrean until 1984.

On 25 May 1936, Săvulescu became a correspondent member of the Romanian Academy of Sciences.

In June 1938 Săvulescu featured in a documentary film of an expedition in the Danube Delta, exploring the local flora. That same year, he married Alice Aronescu, a colleague who after graduating from the University of Bucharest, had obtained a Ph.D. from Columbia University.

Between 29 November 1946 and 30 December 1947, Săvulescu served as Minister of Agriculture under Prime Minister Petru Groza and was Vice President of the Council of Ministers.

In 1948 he became an active member and secretary general of the Romanian Academy. In 1948, with the nationalization initiated by the communist regime, the Academy ceased to exist as a private institution and was reorganized under the name of the Academy of the Romanian People. Săvulescu was appointed president of this new organization during the Romanian People's Republic (1948–1959) by decree of the Presidium of the Great National Assembly. He remained its honorary president until his death in 1963.

In April 1955, during an election meeting of the Academy, Traian Săvulescu came to the defence of former members excluded in 1948 for their previous collaboration with authoritarian, anti-Semitic or fascist governments.

On 23 March 1956, as a gesture towards the abolition of the Academy of Sciences of Romania and its integration into the People's Republic Romanian Academy, Săvulescu, as President of the Academy, organized the inaugural meeting of the Association of Romanian Scientists (AORS).

Săvulescu was a member of several foreign academies, including those from Hungary, Germany, and New York (US). He was also editor of the journal Buletin de la section scientifique de L'Académie Roumaine and member of the editorial boards of the journals Phytopathologische Zeitschrift, Berlin and Sydowia.

He was honoured in the name of a taxon of fungi by Franz Petrak in 1959, Savulescua Petr.. Also in 1959, botanist Cif. published the fungi genus of Savulescuella but the three species were placed in the Doassansiaceae and Doassansiopsidaceae families. High schools in Râmnicu Sărat and Târgu Mureș now bear his name.

== Publications ==
- Săvulescu, Traian (1928), Tratat despre flora Arabiei [Treatise on the flora of Arabia]
- Săvulescu, Traian (1935), Tratat despre flora Palestinei [Treatise on the flora of Palestine]
- Săvulescu, Traian; Zahariadeval (1937), Morfologia, anatomia și patologia porumbului [Morphology, anatomy and pathology of Corn]
- Săvulescu, Traian (1940), Științele Biologice și economia [The biological sciences and economics]
- Săvulescu, Traian (1946), Aspectele actuale ale agriculturii românești [Current issues of Romanian agriculture]
- Săvulescu, Traian (1949), De la practica domesticirii plantelor principio de la Biologie generală [The domestication of plants from the practice of general principles of biology]
- Săvulescu, Traian (ed.), Flora Republicii Populare Române [The Flora of the People's Republic of Romania] five volumes, 1952–1957
- Săvulescu, Traian (1953), Monografia Uredinalelor din România
- Săvulescu, Traian; Săvulescu, Olga (1959), Tratat de patologie vegetală [treatise on Plant Pathology]

== Bibliography ==
- "Personalități românești ale științelor naturii și tehnicii", Editura Științifică și enciclopedică, Bucharest, 1982
- "Traian Săvulescu 1889–1973, Întemeietorul școlii de fitopatologie".
- Trăian Săvulescu 1889-1963. 60 de ani de la moartea sa. Spre aducere aminte. București: 2023.
