= Siege of Odessa =

1941 siege on the Eastern Front of World War II

- Part of the Eastern Front of World War II
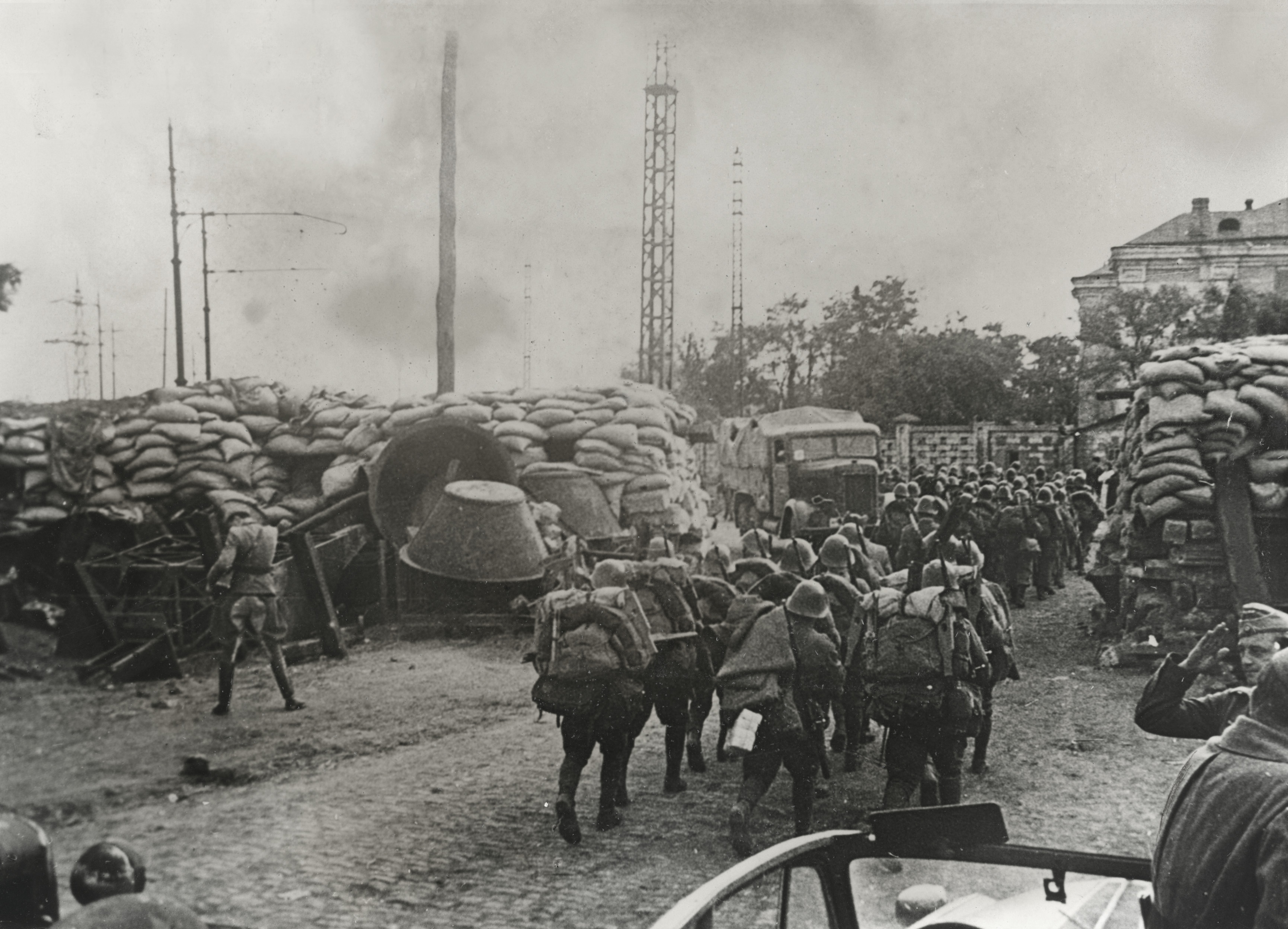
- Romanian troops in Odessa after the siege
Date	8 August – 16 October 1941 (2 months, and 8 days)
Location	Odessa region, Ukrainian SSR, Soviet Union
Result	Axis victory: Successful evacuation of Red Army troops; Subsequent 1941 Odessa massacre

Belligerents
Romania; Germany; Aerial support: (Fascist Italy) Italy	Soviet Union

Commanders and leaders
(Kingdom of Romania) Ion Antonescu (Kingdom of Romania) Alexandru Ioanițiu † (Kingdom of Romania) Iosif Iacobici (Kingdom of Romania) Nicolae Ciupercă (Nazi Germany) Erich von Manstein	(Soviet Union) Georgiy Sofronov (Soviet Union) Ivan Petrov (Soviet Union) Gavriil Zhukov (Soviet Union) Filipp Oktyabrskiy

Units involved
(Kingdom of Romania) 4th Army (Nazi Germany) 11th Army	(Soviet Union) 9th Army (Soviet Union) Coastal Army

Strength
160,000 men (initially); 340,223 men (total)	34,500 men (initial); 240 artillery pieces 86,000 men (total)

Casualties and losses
(Kingdom of Romania) 92,545 overall 17,729 dead 63,345 wounded 11,471 missing 19 tanks 90 artillery pieces 20 aircraft (Nazi Germany) Unknown	60,000 overall

The siege of Odessa, known to the Soviets as the defence of Odessa, lasted from 8 August until 16 October 1941, during the early phase of Operation Barbarossa, the Axis invasion of the Soviet Union during World War II.

Odessa was a port on the Black Sea in the Ukrainian SSR. On 22 June 1941, the Axis powers invaded the Soviet Union. In August, Odessa became a target of the Romanian 4th Army and elements of the German 11th Army. Due to the heavy resistance of the Soviet 9th Independent Army and the rapidly formed Separate Coastal Army, supported by the Black Sea Fleet, it took the Axis forces 73 days of siege and four assaults to take the city. Romanian forces suffered 93,000 casualties, against Red Army casualties estimated to be between 41,000 and 60,000.

It is considered to be the "greatest independent success of the war by any minor Axis power".

== Prelude ==
On 9 July 1941, the Separate Coastal Army was created from the units of the Coastal Group of Forces. On 22 July 1941, the bombing of Odessa began (groups of bombers twice raided the city on that day). As a result of the breakthrough of the Soviet defense on the Dniester River by the 11th German and the 4th Romanian Armies, the situation in the Odessa direction became more complicated. In early August 1941 the troops of the 4th Romanian Army, commanded by General Nicolae Ciupercă (5 infantry divisions, two cavalry divisions and one motorized brigade), cut off the units of the Maritime Army (two rifle divisions and the 1st Cavalry Division) from the main forces of the Southern Front. Subsequently, it was the 4th Romanian Army that was the main attacking force in the fight for Odessa. In addition to the Romanian troops, the 72nd Infantry Division of the Wehrmacht (in part), 2 German assault and 4 German engineer battalions, 3 German heavy artillery divisions, and periodically Luftwaffe units were also involved near Odessa. By early September the total number of German-Romanian troops near Odessa was about 277,000 soldiers and officers, up to 2,200 guns and mortars, 100–120 tanks, and 300 to 400 planes.

== Battle ==
The defense of Odessa lasted 73 days, from 5 August to 16 October 1941. On 10 August, in the sector of the 3rd Corps, the bulk of the 7th Infantry Division reached Elssas, while the 1st Guard Division arrived on the alignment Strassburg–Petra Evdokievka. In the sector of the 5th Corps, the 1st Armored Division broke through Odessa's first line of defense. That evening, the Romanian division reached the second line of defense. The 1st Cavalry Brigade took Severinovca and joined the 1st Armored Division. At the same time, the 10th Dorobanți Regiment overran the Soviet forces at Lozovaya. The 4th Army gradually closed the circle around Odessa, but the offensive was temporarily stopped by Ion Antonescu on 13 August to strengthen the line west of the Hadjibey bank.

The offensive resumed on 16 August, as Romanian troops attacked along the entire line, capturing Odessa's water reservoirs on 17 August. The Soviet forces put up a stubborn resistance, launching repeated counter-attacks, inflicting and taking heavy casualties. The Royal Romanian Air Force actively supported the ground troops, disrupting Soviet naval traffic to and from Odessa, and also destroying an armored train on 20 August.

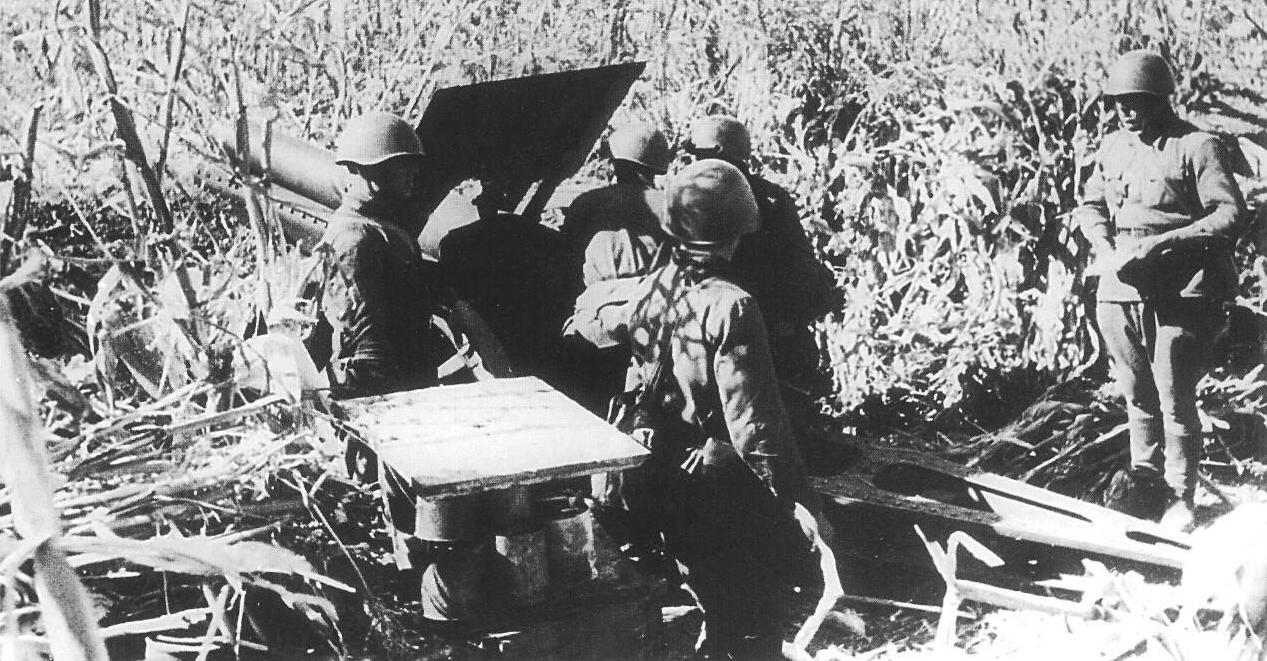
A Soviet gun crew during the siege

By 24 August, despite constant attacks, the Romanians were bogged down in front of the Soviets' main line of defense. The 4th Army had already suffered 27,307 casualties, including 5,329 killed in action. Nevertheless, the Soviets were also weakened, and thanks to the capture of Kubanka, Romanian heavy artillery now threatened the port of Odessa. Over the next three days, there was a lull in the fighting.

On 28 August, the Romanians resumed their offensive, reinforced by a German assault battalion and ten heavy artillery battalions. The 4th, 11th and 1st Army Corps advanced towards Gnileakovo and Vakarzhany, only to be pushed back in some areas by a strong Soviet counterattack the following day. On 30 August the Romanians retook the initiative, but gained very little ground. Hitler and the German High Command noted that 'Antonescu [was] using at Odessa the tactics of the First World War,' depending upon infantry to make unsupported frontal attacks against Soviet trench line defenses. The Soviets temporarily retook Kubanka but were driven back by nightfall. Soviet troops in Vakarzhany were encircled and continued to fight until 3 September, when combined German and Romanian infantry successfully stormed the village.

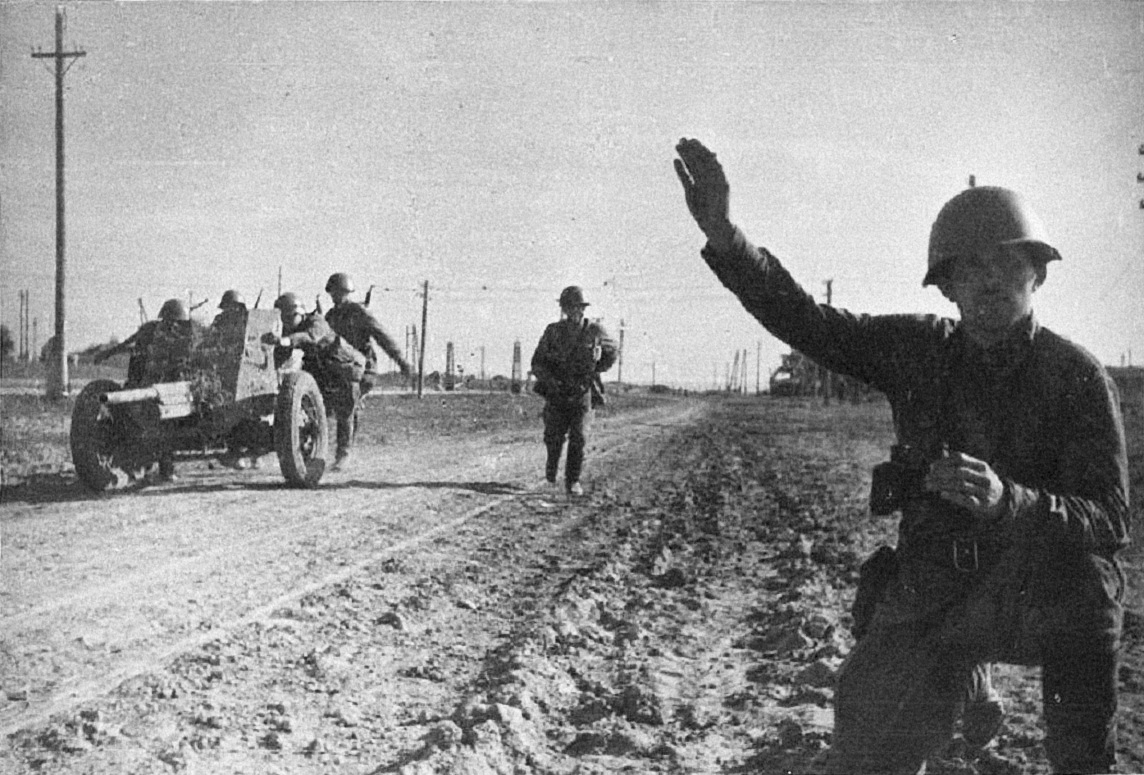
Anti-tank platoon commander Lieutenant Vasily Gavrilovich Kabanenko of the 25th Rifle Division gives a command to his gun crew, while repulsing a tank attack in August 1941

On 3 September, General Ciupercă submitted a memoir to by-now Marshal Antonescu, highlighting the poor condition of the front-line divisions, which were exhausted after nearly a month of continuous fighting. He proposed a reorganization of six divisions (the 3rd, 6th, 7th, 14th, 21st Infantry and Guard Divisions), which would be split into 2 corps and supported by 8 heavy artillery battalions. These units would then attack in a single area to break through the Soviet line. The memoir however, was rejected by both Antonescu and Brigadier-General Alexandru Ioanițiu, chief of the Romanian General Staff, who argued that an attack in a single direction would leave the rest of the Romanian line too exposed. Marshal Antonescu subsequently issued a new directive calling for attacks between Tatarka and Dalnik, and Gniliavko and Dalnik, to be made by the 11th and 3rd Corps, respectively. Ioanițiu forwarded a note to Major-General Arthur Hauffe, chief of the German military mission to Romania, informing him of the situation at Odessa and requesting assistance in the form of aircraft and several pioneer battalions. Although the Royal Romanian Air Force enjoyed some success against the Soviets ground and air forces, it was ill-equipped for anti-shipping raids, and the Soviets were being steadily reinforced and resupplied via the Navy.

Meanwhile, the Romanian offensive was halted to wait for reinforcements. A German detachment led by Lieutenant-General René von Courbier and comprising one infantry regiment, one assault pioneer regiment and two artillery regiments arrived. Concurrently, the Soviets also received ammunition and 15,000 men. On 9 September, Ciupercă was replaced by Lieutenant-General Iosif Iacobici, who was expressly ordered to follow the General Staff's directives without question. The offensive resumed on 12 September, but was again stopped temporarily on 14 September as Romanian and German artillery units were running low on ammunition. Two Vânători battalions were encircled by Red Army troops near the Hadjibey bank, but were eventually relieved despite Soviet efforts to annihilate them.

On the night of 15 September, Soviet troops broke contact with the Romanian 1st Corps and retreated toward the southeast. On 16 September, the 1st Corps took the heights northwest of Gross-Liebenthal. Romanian troops also occupied the area south of the Sukhoy bank. Over 3,000 Soviet soldiers were captured, but these losses were replaced by the 157th Rifle Division, with a strength of 12,600 troops. Also, 18 Soviet companies were brought in from Novorossiysk. Partisan fighting continued, however, in the city's catacombs.

The Soviet counteroffensive which was meant to break the siege came during the night of 21/22 September 1941, and it was the climax of the battle for Odessa. Red Army troops established a bridgehead at Chebanka, threatening the Romanian 4th Army's weaker right flank. Before the Soviets could attack, a formation of 94 Romanian aircraft (32 bombers and 62 fighters) supported by 23 Italian aircraft attacked the Red Army troops as they advanced north. During the ensuing aerial battle, which lasted ten hours, numerous bombing and strafing attacks were carried out against the Soviet bridgehead, as well as numerous dogfights with the Soviet Air Force. The bridgehead was pulverized, with all Soviet troops withdrawing from the area during the night of 4/5 October. Axis air forces destroyed over 20 Soviet aircraft (nine or ten of them during air battles) while losing one Romanian fighter during air combat plus four more either shot down by Soviet flak or destroyed on the ground. One Italian Savoia-Marchetti bomber was also lost.

With the advance of Axis forces into the Soviet Union, Stavka decided to evacuate the defenders of Odessa. On the night of 14–15 October 1941, the Black Sea Fleet evacuated the garrison to Sevastopol where most of the units were later destroyed in the bitter fighting that took place there during the defence of Sevastopol. The Black Sea Fleet also managed to evacuate 350,000 soldiers and civilians.

== Naval warfare ==
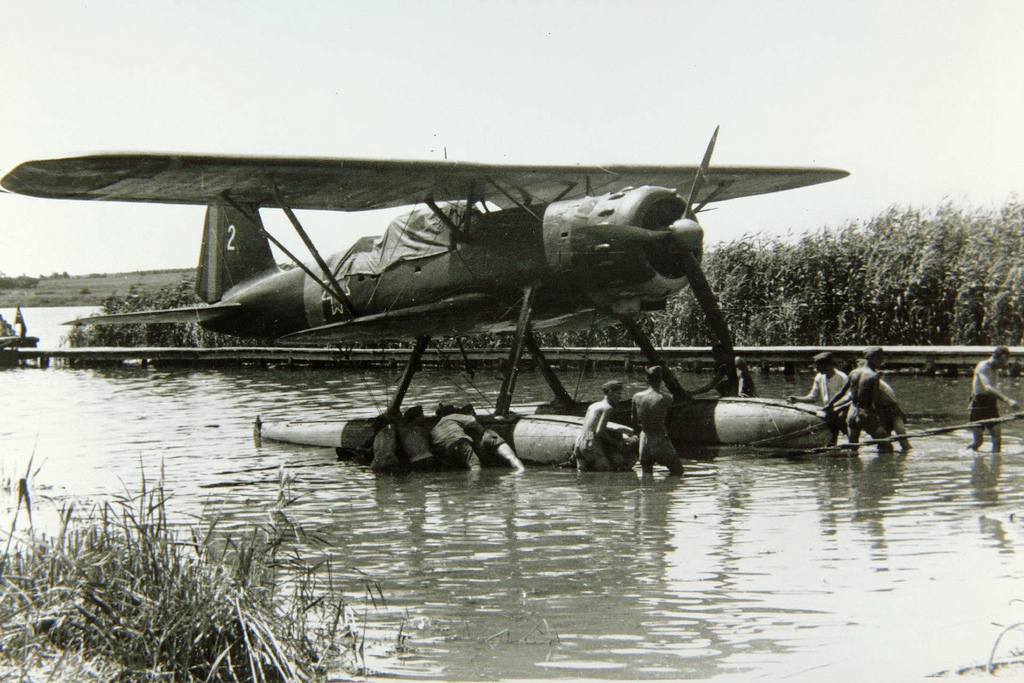
Romanian Heinkel He 114 seaplane

In support of the land offensive, the Romanian Navy dispatched motor torpedo boats to the recently occupied port of Vylkove (Vâlcov in Romanian). During the night of 18 September, the motor torpedo boats NMS Viscolul and NMS Vijelia attacked a Soviet convoy south of Odessa, each boat launching her two torpedoes at the closest enemy destroyer. Three of the four torpedoes missed. The fourth torpedo struck and damaged a Soviet destroyer, but failed to detonate. It was one of the few actions the Romanian Navy undertook to support the siege, which was generally limited to patrols by the submarine Delfinul. No Western source could be found to confirm this claim.

On 20 August, Delfinul fought the only submarine vs submarine engagement of the siege. At 12:08 pm, the Soviet M-class submarine M-33 launched a torpedo at her, which missed. Delfinul swiftly counterattacked with her twin 13 mm machine gun, causing the Soviet submarine to submerge and retreat.

During the October evacuation, Heinkel He 114 seaplanes of the Romanian Naval Aviation captured a Soviet armed merchantman.

== Aftermath ==
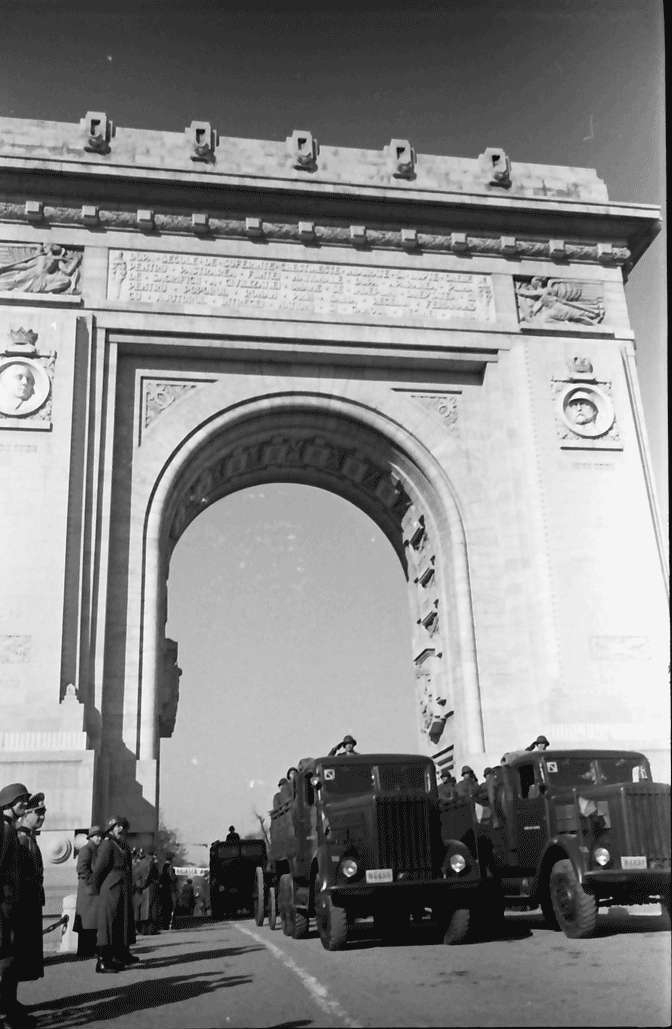
Parade organized at Arcul de Triumf for the return of the Romanian troops from Odessa in November 1941

The operations at Odessa highlighted significant weaknesses in the Romanian Army, leading both military and political leaders in the country to call for a discontinuation of military operations against the Soviet Union. Antonescu ignored such objections, regarding continued participation and eventual victory on the Eastern Front as necessary for the restoration of Romania's territorial integrity. On the other hand, the capture of Odessa enabled Antonescu to surpass Mussolini in prestige, as the latter had no comparable spoils. Odessa was the most important wartime conquest – without substantial German support – by any of the minor European Axis powers.

The siege of Odessa partly overlapped with the Battle of Kiev (7 July – 26 September 1941). Some military historians argue that the occupation of Odessa by Romanian troops greatly facilitated the Germany victory in Kiev, due to the fact that the Soviets were unable to move enough troops to break the encirclement of the Southwestern Front of the Red Army near Kiev, while other historians argue that the success achieved by the Romanians on the southern flank of the front was made possible by the catastrophic Soviet defeat at Kiev.

Casualties suffered during the siege of Odessa were:

- Romanian
  - 17,729 dead, 63,345 wounded, and 11,471 missing
- Soviet
  - 16,578 dead or missing, and 24,690 wounded (Glantz)
  - 60,000 dead, wounded or missing (Axworthy)

The recapture of Bessarabia and Northern Bukovina in Operation München and the subsequent victory at Odessa led to a partial demobilization of the Romanian army, which was reduced in size from nearly 900,000 personnel on 1 October to 465,000 on 1 January 1942. Politically, the presence of Romanian troops in Odessa and the establishment of the Transnistria Governorate led to a deterioration of Romania's international situation, with the British declaring war on Romania on 6 December, and on 12 December Romania declaring war on the United States in solidarity with Germany and Japan.

The Romanian occupation of Odessa led to the persecution and murder of Jews and Roma in the area; by one account 250,000 Jews and 12,000 Roma died during the Romanian occupation. The Axis forces would eventually be cleared from Odessa on 10 April 1944 during the Odessa Offensive.

== Commemoration ==
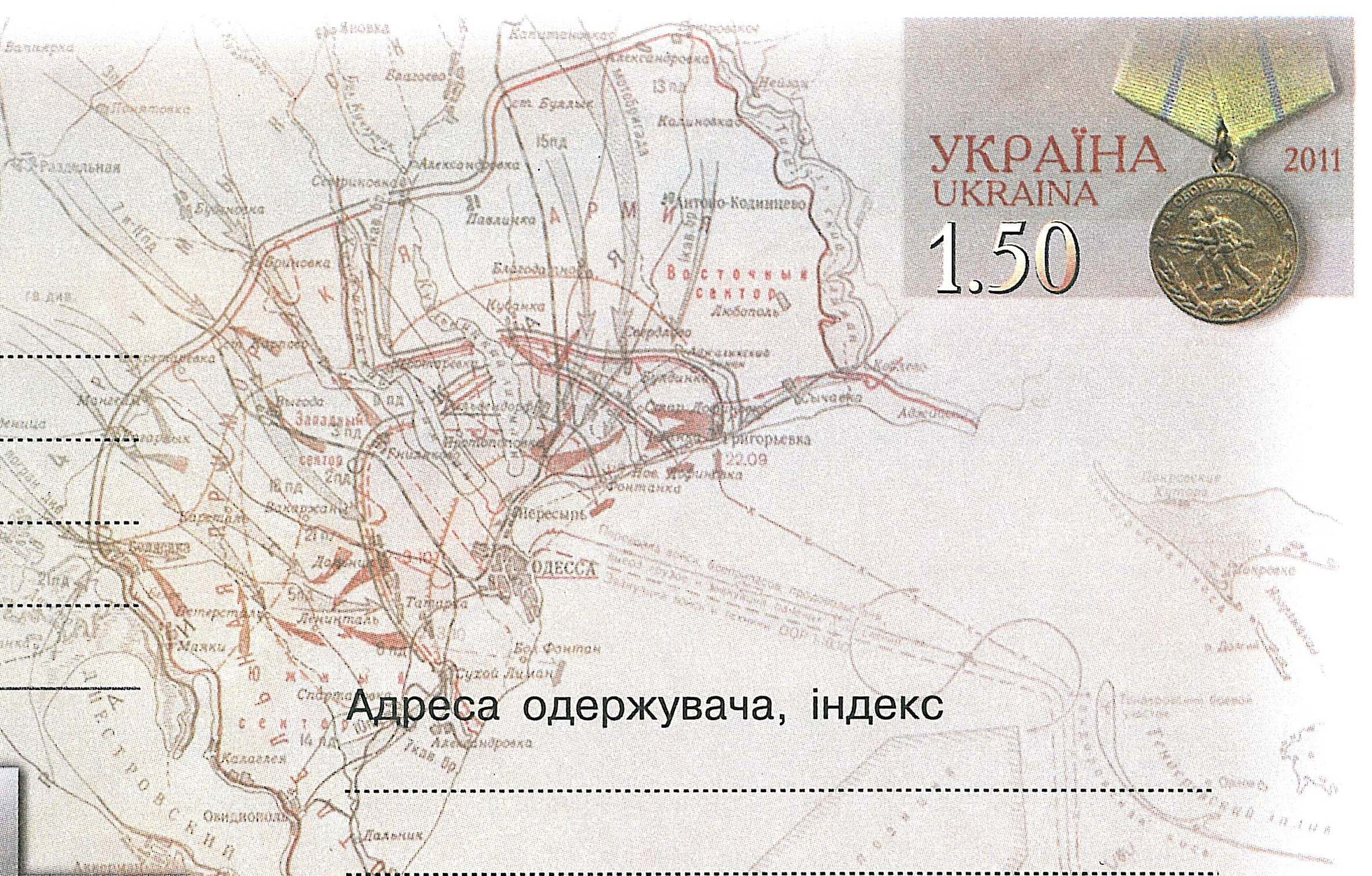
"Map of Odessa Defense" From Ukrainian Postal Service, 2011

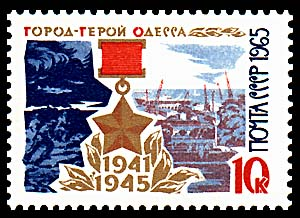
Postage stamp of the USSR 1965 "Hero City Odessa 1941–-1945"

Odessa was one of the first four Soviet cities to be awarded the title of "Hero City" in 1945, the others being Leningrad, Stalingrad, and Sevastopol. Museum of the Heroic Defense of Odessa (411th Coastal Battery Memorial) was opened on the day of the 30th anniversary of the victory over Nazi Germany, 9 May 1975. Close by is also the Museum of Partisan Glory in the Odessa Catacombs. The underground museum commemorates the partisan movement in the Odessa region.

== See also ==
- Transnistria Governorate
- Romania in World War II
- Odessa massacre
- Battle of Kiev (1941)
