= Alexandru Ioanițiu =

Romanian major general

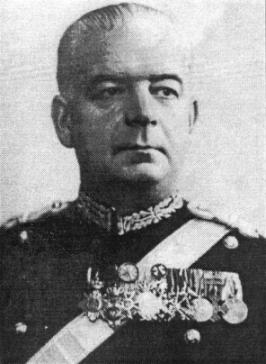
- Born: 2 February 1890; Botoșani, Kingdom of Romania
- Died: 17 September 1941 (aged 51); Baden, Ukraine, Soviet Union
- Burial place: Ghencea Cemetery, Bucharest
- Education: Carol I National Defence University
- Military career
- Allegiance: Kingdom of Romania
- Branch: Royal Romanian Army
- Service years: 1910–1941
- Rank: Major general
- Conflicts: World War I; Battle of the Argeș; Battle of Mărășești; World War II; Eastern Front; Siege of Odessa †
- Awards: Order of Michael the Brave, 3rd Class; Order of the Crown (Romania), Commander rank

Chief of the Romanian General Staff
- In office 6 September 1940 – 17 September 1941
- Monarch: Michael I
- Prime Minister: Ion Antonescu
- Preceded by: Gheorghe Mihail
- Succeeded by: Iosif Iacobici

Alexandru Ioanițiu (2 February 1890 – 17 September 1941) was a Romanian major general. He led Romanian troops against the Soviet Union during World War II, and was killed when he accidentally stepped into the moving propeller of his aircraft upon landing at an airport near Odessa while it was under siege. From September 1940 until his death, he served as Chief of the Romanian General Staff.

== Biography ==
Ioanițiu was born in Botoșani, in northern Moldavia. He attended the military school in Iași, graduating as second lieutenant in 1910 and lieutenant in 1913. After Romania entered World War I on the side of the Allies, he fought in the Romanian Campaign of 1916 in Dobruja and at the Battle of the Argeș. He was promoted to captain in 1916 and major in 1917, and fought at the Battle of Mărășești.

Afterwards he pursued his studies at the Higher War School in Bucharest (1919–1920). He was promoted to lieutenant colonel in 1928, to colonel in 1933, and to brigadier general in 1939. From May 1939 to September 1940 he was the commander of the Higher War School. Under his leadership, the first Romanian paratrooper company was created on 10 June 1940. Also in 1940, he was awarded the Order of the Crown, Commander rank.

From 6 September 1940, General Ioanițiu served as Chief of the Romanian General Staff. Romania joined Operation Barbarossa on 22 June 1941 in order to reclaim the lost territories of Bessarabia and Northern Bukovina, which had been annexed by the Soviet Union in June 1940. On 17 September he accompanied Marshal Ion Antonescu to the front, to oversee the Romanian offensive during the Siege of Odessa. Just after their Fieseler Fi 156 Storch plane landed at an airport in Baden, near Odessa, Ioanițiu was killed in a freak accident, hit by the plane's propeller.

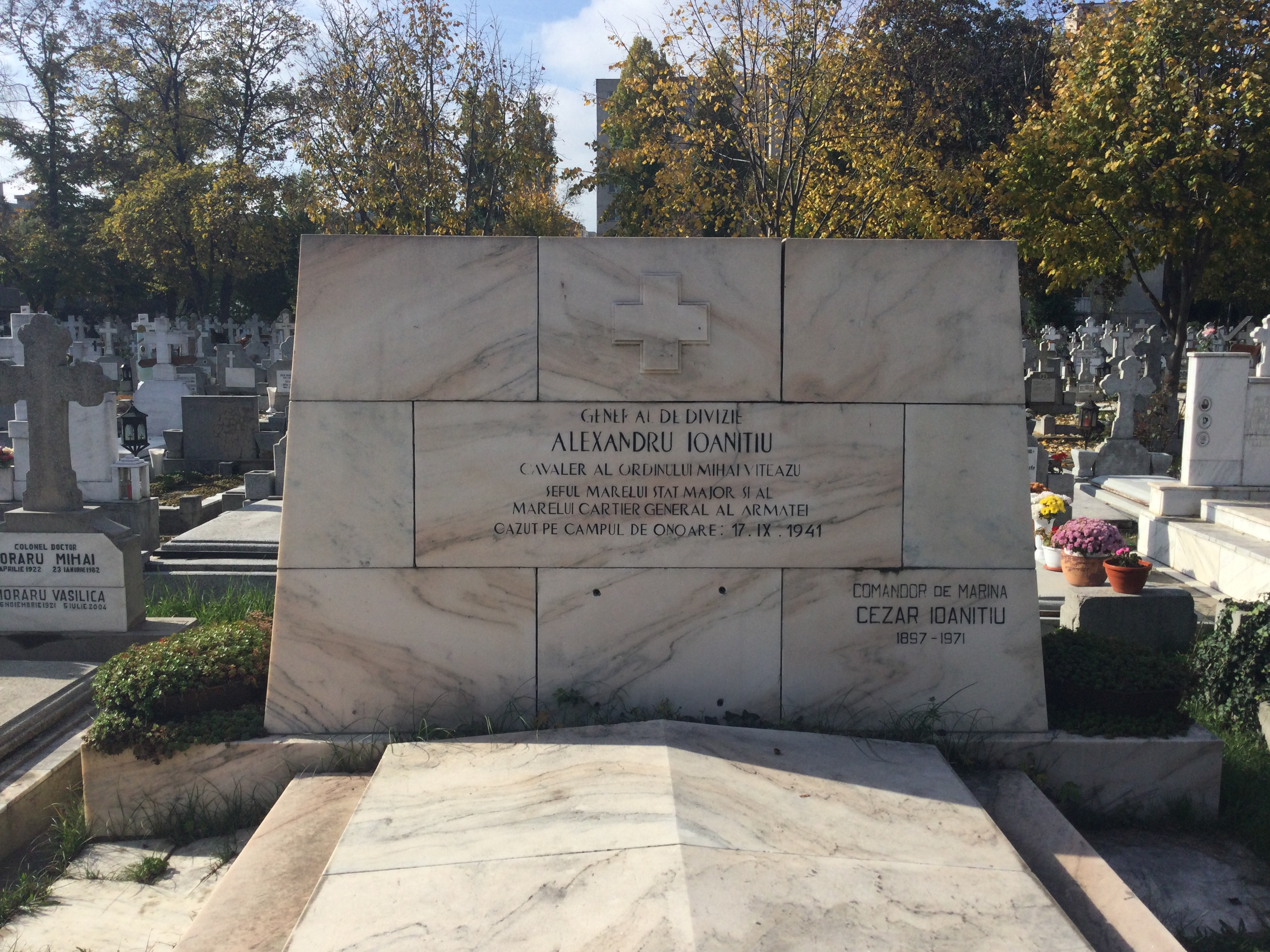
Grave in Ghencea Cemetery

He was promoted posthumously to major general, and was awarded post-mortem the Order of Michael the Brave, 3rd class, "for special merits on the battlefield as Chief of the General Staff." He is buried at Ghencea Cemetery, in Bucharest.

An alley in the city of Botoșani is named after him.

== Writings ==
- Ioanițiu, Alexandru (1928). Războiul României (1916–1918). București: Tipografia Geniului. OCLC 1079085090.
- Ioanițiu, Alexandru; Vasilescu, Petre I. (1930). Virtuțile neamului în lumina războiului nostru național: pentru generațiile de azi și de mâine. Timișoara: Tipografia Școalei Pregătitoare de Ofițeri Activi de Artilerie "Regele Carol I". OCLC 1079078438.
- Elemente de strategie, with General Ion Sichitiu, 1936
- Călăuza ofițerului. Strategie și tactică aplicată, 1936
