= Ioan Glogojeanu =

Romanian general

- Born: 1 July 1888; Râmnicu Sărat, Buzău County, Kingdom of Romania
- Died: 22 October 1941 (aged 53) Odessa, Odessa District, Transnistria Governorate
- Allegiance: Kingdom of Romania
- Branch: Royal Romanian Army
- Service years: 1909–1941
- Rank: Sublocotenent (1909); Locotenent (1912); Căpitan (1917); Maior (1919); Lieutenant Colonel (1926); General de Brigadă (1939); General de Divizie Post-Mortem (1941)
- Commands: 10th Infantry Division
- Conflicts: World War I; World War II; Siege of Odessa
- Awards: Order of Michael the Brave, 3rd Class (Post Mortem); Order of the Crown (Romania)

Ioan Glogojanu (1 July 1888 – 22 October 1941) was a Romanian general of the 10th Infantry Division of the Romanian army during World War II.

Glogojanu was one of the Romanian commanders during the Siege of Odessa. He became chief military administrator of Odessa on 22 October, but was killed by an explosion at his headquarters, set up by Soviet agents, only a month after the fall of the city. His death, and the death of 60 others in that explosion, served as the catalyst for the Odessa massacre. He was awarded the Romania's Order of the Crown, Commander rank (in May 1941), and the Order of Michael the Brave, 3rd Class (post mortem).
