= Alice Săvulescu =

Romanian botanist

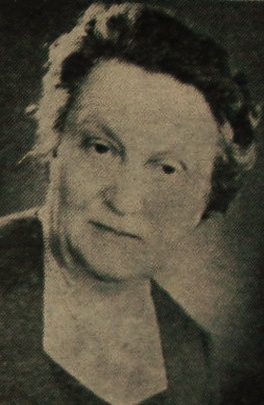
- Born: Alice Aronescu; 29 October 1905; Oltenița, Călărași County, Kingdom of Romania
- Died: 1 February 1970 (aged 64); Bucharest, Socialist Republic of Romania
- Education: University of Bucharest; Columbia University
- Known for: mycology
- Spouse: Traian Săvulescu
- Awards: Elected titular member of the Romanian Academy in 1963
- Scientific career
- Fields: Botany
- Doctoral advisor: Bernard Ogilvie Dodge

Alice Săvulescu (29 October 1905 – 1 February 1970) was a Romanian botanist who studied various fungi and their relationships to their hosts. After completing her undergraduate studies at the University of Bucharest, she earned a Ph.D. from Columbia University before returning to Romania. Throughout her career, she researched and published over 150 scientific papers. She served as deputy director and full director of several research institutions in Romania and was elected a titular member of the Romanian Academy in 1963.

== Early life ==
Alice Aronescu was born on 29 October 1905 in Oltenița, Călărași County, into a Jewish family. She began her studies in biology at the University of Bucharest, graduating in 1929. That same year, she took a position at the Institute of Tobacco and Fermentation, working there for two years. In 1931, Aronescu went abroad to New York City to continue her education, under the direction of Bernard Ogilvie Dodge. In 1934, she received a PhD in microbiology and pathophysiology from Columbia University, with a thesis describing a fungus which attacked roses and returned to Romania.

== Career ==
Aronescu began working as the head of the laboratory of the Agronomical Research Institute (Romanian: Institutul de Cercetări Agronomice (ICAR)) in 1934, under the director of the section on Plant Pathology, Traian Săvulescu. She was an asset to the department because she spoke English, but a liability because of her heritage.

The two married in 1938 but shortly afterwards, in 1940, both were dismissed from their teaching posts because of Aronescu's Jewish heritage. Rehired in 1941, they continued their work. Săvulescu's main focus of study was on diseases which effected cereals, fruit trees, and potatoes and analysis of parasite-host relationships, as well as the applicable use of fungicides. Some of her later works evaluated the use of radioactive isotopes in agriculture. When her husband left the ICAR in 1949, Săvulescu replaced him as director.

In 1952, Săvulescu was made a corresponding member of the Romanian People's Republic Academy. Five years later, she became the deputy director of the Center for Biological Research (Romanian: Centrul de Cercetări Biologice) and in 1959 was appointed deputy director of the animal morphology laboratory. The following year, she was appointed the deputy director of the "Traian Săvulescu" Institute of Biology. Made a full member of the Romanian People's Republic Academy in 1963, she was promoted to director of the Institute of Biology in 1964. Throughout her career, she authored or co-authored more than 150 scientific publications.

== Death and legacy ==
In 1970, right after leaving a meeting with Nicolae Ceaușescu, the head of state, who informed her that the Institute was being transferred to the Department of Agriculture, Săvulescu suffered a heart attack. She died on 1 February 1970 in Bucharest.
