= Râmnicu Sărat =

City in Buzău County, Romania

- Municipality
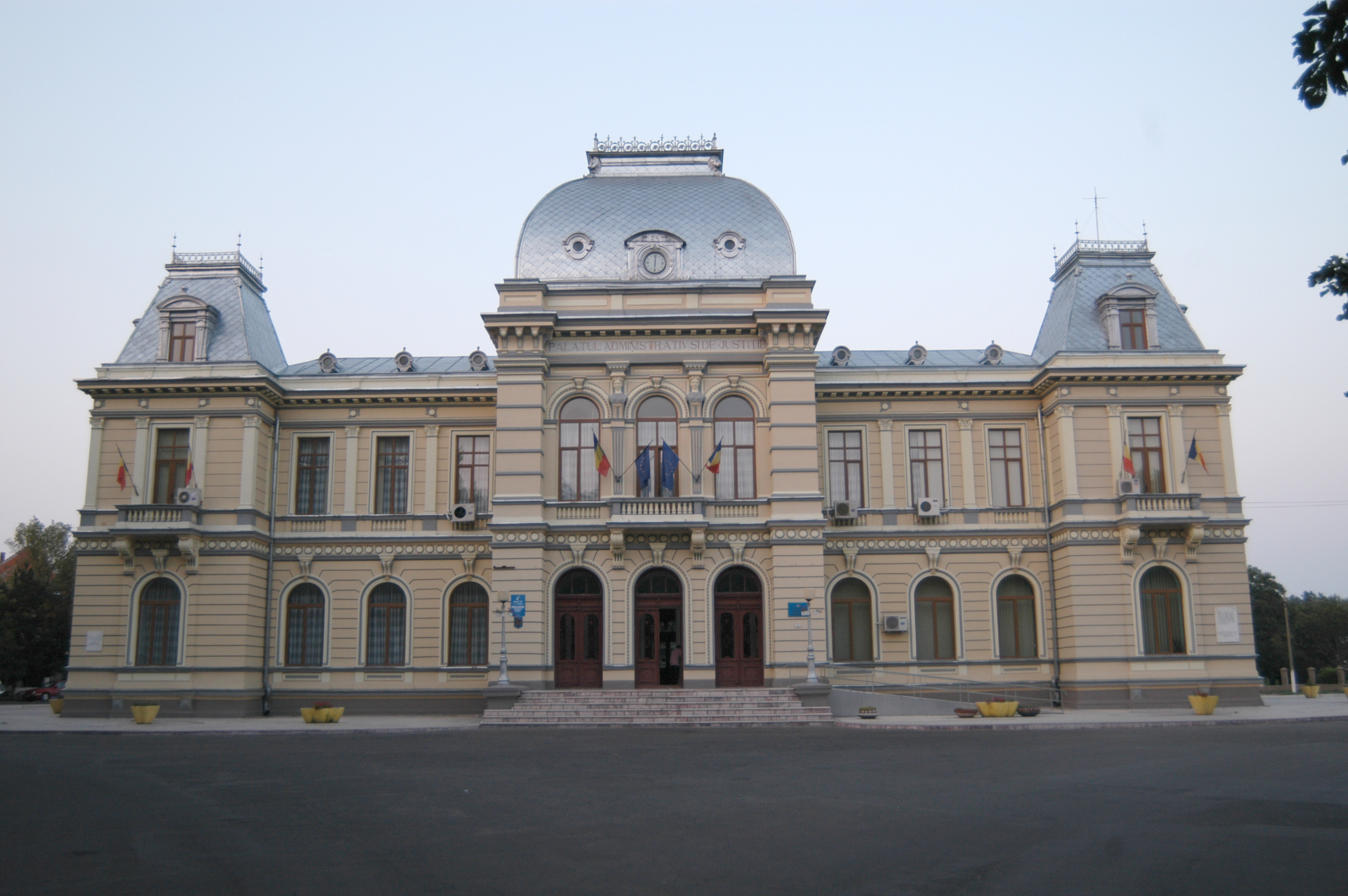
- Râmnicu Sărat town hall

- Coat of arms

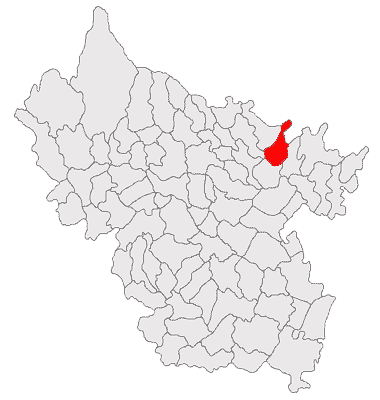
- Location in Buzău County

- Location in Romania
- Coordinates: 45°22′48″N 27°3′36″E
- Country: Romania
- County: Buzău

Government
  - Mayor (2024–2028): Sorin-Valentin Cîrjan (PSD)
- Area: 8.77 km^{2} (3.39 sq mi)
- Elevation: 118 m (387 ft)
- Population (2021-12-01): 29,774
  - Density: 3,390/km^{2} (8,790/sq mi)
- Time zone: UTC+02:00 (EET)
  - Summer (DST): UTC+03:00 (EEST)
- Postal code: 125300
- Area code: (+40) 02 38
- Vehicle reg.: BZ
- Website: primariermsarat.ro

Râmnicu Sărat (also spelled Rîmnicu Sărat, Romanian pronunciation: [ˌrɨmniku səˈrat], German: Rümnick or Rebnick; Turkish: Remnik) is a city in Buzău County, Romania, in the historical region of Muntenia. It was first attested in a document of 1439, and raised to the rank of municipiu in 1994.

The city rises from a marshy plain, east of the Carpathian Mountains, and west of the cornlands of southern Moldavia. It lies on the left bank of the river Râmnicul Sărat. Salt and petroleum are worked in the mountains, and there is a considerable trade in agricultural produce and preserved meat.

== Population ==
Historical population
Year	Pop.	±%
1859	5,707	—
1900	13,134	+130.1%
1912	14,496	+10.4%
1930	15,007	+3.5%
1948	19,267	+28.4%
1956	19,095	−0.9%
1966	22,336	+17.0%
1977	28,689	+28.4%
1992	41,405	+44.3%
2002	38,805	−6.3%
2011	31,256	−19.5%
2021	29,774	−4.7%
Source: Census data

== Geography ==
The city is located in the north of Muntenia and Buzău County. The A7 motorway, which connects Buzău to Focșani, passes near the city and is served by the Râmnicu Sărat interchange.The interchange connects to DN22 (National Road 22), which leads east toward Brăila and further on to Tulcea and Constanța. To the west, DN 22 leads to the northern part of the city, where it joins DN2 (National Road 2), the previously existing road between Buzău and Focșani. Another road branching off from DN22 is DJ202 (a county road), which runs from the city downstream along the Râmnicu Sărat River toward the neighboring towns.

The Buzău–Mărășești railway line also passes through Râmnicu Sărat, the city Station being designed by architect Nicolae Michăescu.

== Climate ==
Râmnicu Sărat has a hot-summer humid continental climate (Dfa) according to the Köppen climate classification, being influenced by its position near the Carpathian Curvature and the North Dobrogean Orogen, as well as by the stepped relief and the main baric centres affecting southeastern Europe.

Because the area is close to major mountain ranges, cold air from the Arctic and polar regions is often funneled into the region by high-pressure systems over Eastern Europe and Scandinavia. As a result, winds most commonly blow from the north (about 21.2%) and northeast (15.9%). The region also experiences foehn winds, which occur when air coming from the west moves over the Carpathian Mountains and descends on the other side. As the air descends, it becomes warmer and drier, creating milder local conditions. Winds influenced by the Siberian High mainly come from the north and northeast.

Precipitation in the area is influenced by several factors, including the nearby Carpathian Mountains, the varied landscape, and the characteristics of the land surface. Weather systems bringing continental and tropical air masses, as well as Mediterranean cyclones moving into the region, also play an important role. These factors create a variable rainfall pattern, with periods of both moderate precipitation and occasional heavy rain.

Recorded climate extremes at Râmnicu Sărat include a maximum air temperature of 41.0 °C (20 July 1987) and a minimum of −21.5 °C (18 January 1963). The highest daily precipitation total was 95.2 mm (28 June 1982), while the highest monthly total reached 203.9 mm (August 1972). The maximum recorded snow depth was 66 cm (15 February 2012). On 28 June 1982, a 15-minute hailstorm was recorded at the station, causing damage to windows and thermometric instruments.

Climate data for Râmnicu Sărat (altitude 152m, 2014–2026 normals, extremes 1981–present)
Month	Jan	Feb	Mar	Apr	May	Jun	Jul	Aug	Sep	Oct	Nov	Dec	Year
Record high °C (°F)	19.9 (67.8)	25.6 (78.1)	26.3 (79.3)	31.8 (89.2)	34.3 (93.7)	38.2 (100.8)	41.0 (105.8)	40.6 (105.1)	36.5 (97.7)	32.8 (91.0)	25.1 (77.2)	19.8 (67.6)	41.0 (105.8)
Mean daily maximum °C (°F)	5.1 (41.2)	7.4 (45.3)	12.3 (54.1)	17.7 (63.9)	22.7 (72.9)	28.1 (82.6)	30.3 (86.5)	30.6 (87.1)	25.3 (77.5)	18.0 (64.4)	10.7 (51.3)	6.6 (43.9)	17.9 (64.2)
Daily mean °C (°F)	1.2 (34.2)	3.3 (37.9)	7.4 (45.3)	12.0 (53.6)	17.0 (62.6)	22.3 (72.1)	24.2 (75.6)	24.4 (75.9)	19.5 (67.1)	12.9 (55.2)	7.0 (44.6)	3.1 (37.6)	12.9 (55.1)
Mean daily minimum °C (°F)	−2.8 (27.0)	−0.8 (30.6)	2.4 (36.3)	6.3 (43.3)	11.2 (52.2)	16.5 (61.7)	18.0 (64.4)	18.1 (64.6)	13.7 (56.7)	7.7 (45.9)	3.3 (37.9)	−0.4 (31.3)	7.8 (46.0)
Record low °C (°F)	−21.5 (−6.7)	−20.6 (−5.1)	−14.4 (6.1)	−3.8 (25.2)	0.2 (32.4)	6.0 (42.8)	9.5 (49.1)	9.0 (48.2)	1.7 (35.1)	−5.8 (21.6)	−12.6 (9.3)	−19.5 (−3.1)	−21.5 (−6.7)
Average precipitation mm (inches)	32.5 (1.28)	31.2 (1.23)	38.4 (1.51)	41.6 (1.64)	63.4 (2.50)	98.0 (3.86)	46.9 (1.85)	44.7 (1.76)	38.9 (1.53)	53.7 (2.11)	54.1 (2.13)	45.3 (1.78)	588.7 (23.18)
Average precipitation days (≥ 1.0 mm)	5.6	5.0	5.4	6.2	7.8	8.7	7.2	4.7	4.4	5.4	7.0	6.6	74
Average snowy days	7.8	5.5	3.0	0.7	0	0	0	0	0	0.2	2.1	4.4	23.7
Source: Meteomanz (2014-2026); Infoclimat (1980-2010); ANM

== History ==
Râmnicu Sărat was the scene of battles between the Wallachians and Ottomans in 1634, 1434, and 1573.

It was also here that, in 1789 (during the Russo-Turkish War of 1787–1792), an army of Imperial Russian and Habsburg troops, commanded by Alexander Suvorov, defeated the Ottoman forces in the Battle of Rymnik. For this victory, Suvorov was awarded the victory title of "Count of Rymnik" or "Rimniksky" (граф Рымникский) by empress Catherine the Great of Russia.

In 1854, Râmnicu Sărat was almost destroyed by fire and was rebuilt. From 1864 to 1950 (with the exception of 1938–1940), the city was the seat of Râmnicu Sărat County. From 1901 to 1963, the Râmnicu Sărat Prison operated in the city.

== Educational institutions ==
- Alexandru Vlahuță National College
- Ștefan cel Mare Theoretical High School
- Elina Matei Basarab Technological Economic High School
- Victor Frunză Technological High School
- Traian Săvulescu Technological High School

== Natives ==
- Petre Antonescu
- Mariana Bitang
- Romeo Bunică
- Kid Cann
- Nicolae Ciupercă
- Nicolae Fleva
- Ioan Glogojeanu
- Pompiliu Iordache
- Petre Iorgulescu-Yor
- Damian Militaru
- Nicolae Minovici
- Ștefan Minovici
- Costin Murgescu
- Leonida Nedelcu
- Eduard Nicola
- Adrian Oțoiu
- Ștefan Petrescu
- Traian Săvulescu
- Saul Steinberg
- Nicu Stoian
- Marius Tigoianu

== Gallery ==
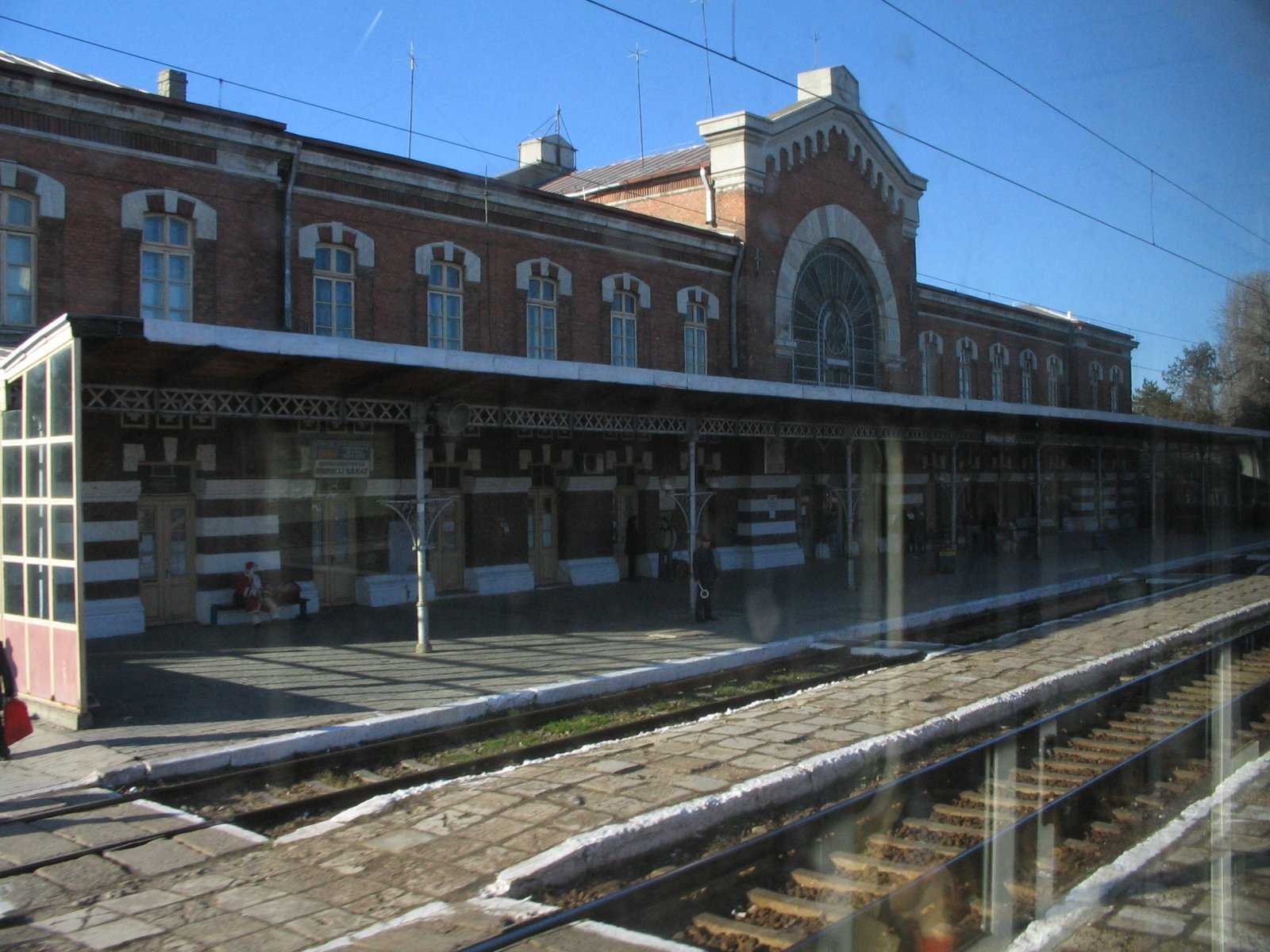
The Râmnicu Sărat train station, designed by Anghel Saligny

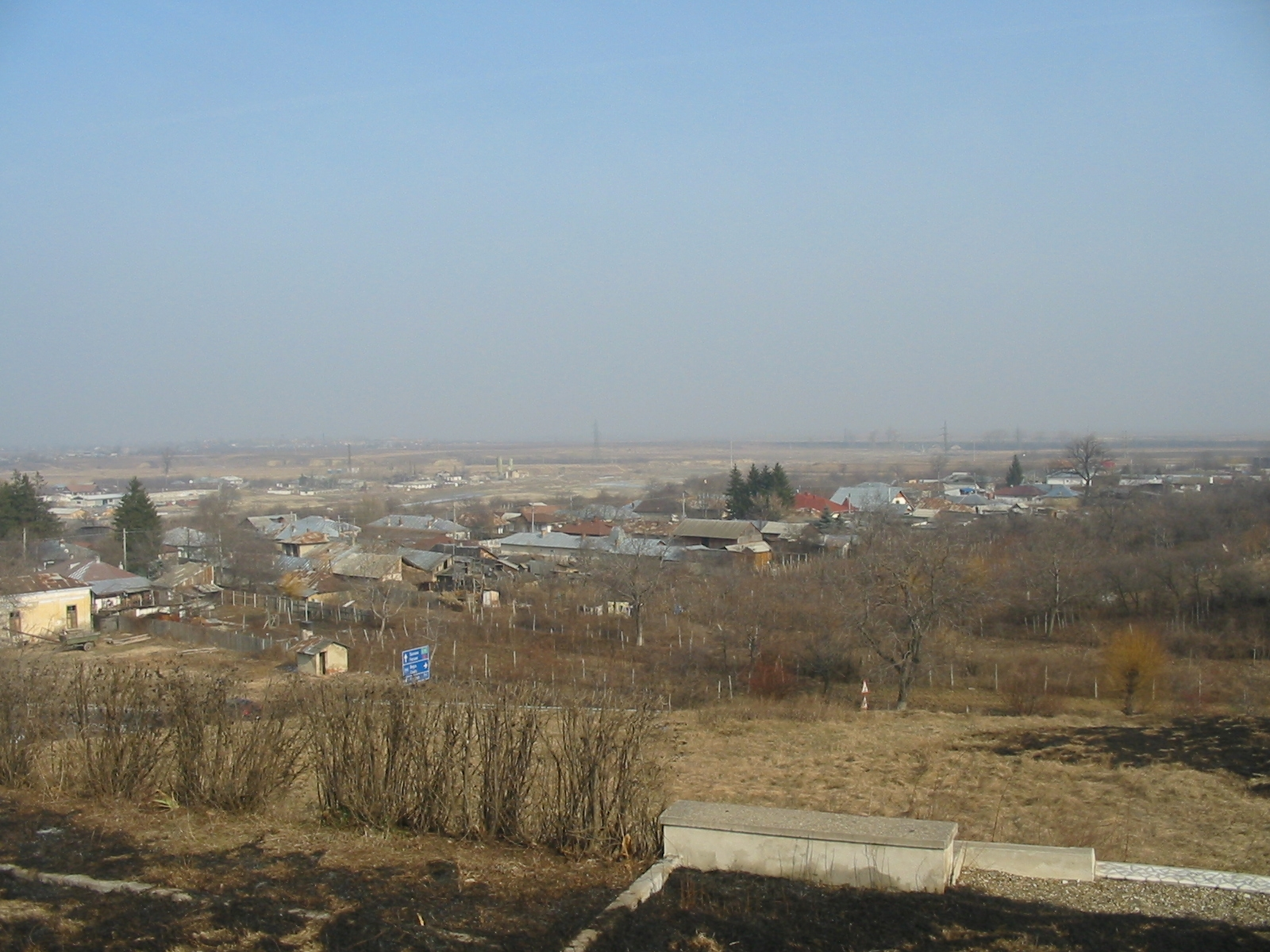
The Battle of Rymnik battlefield

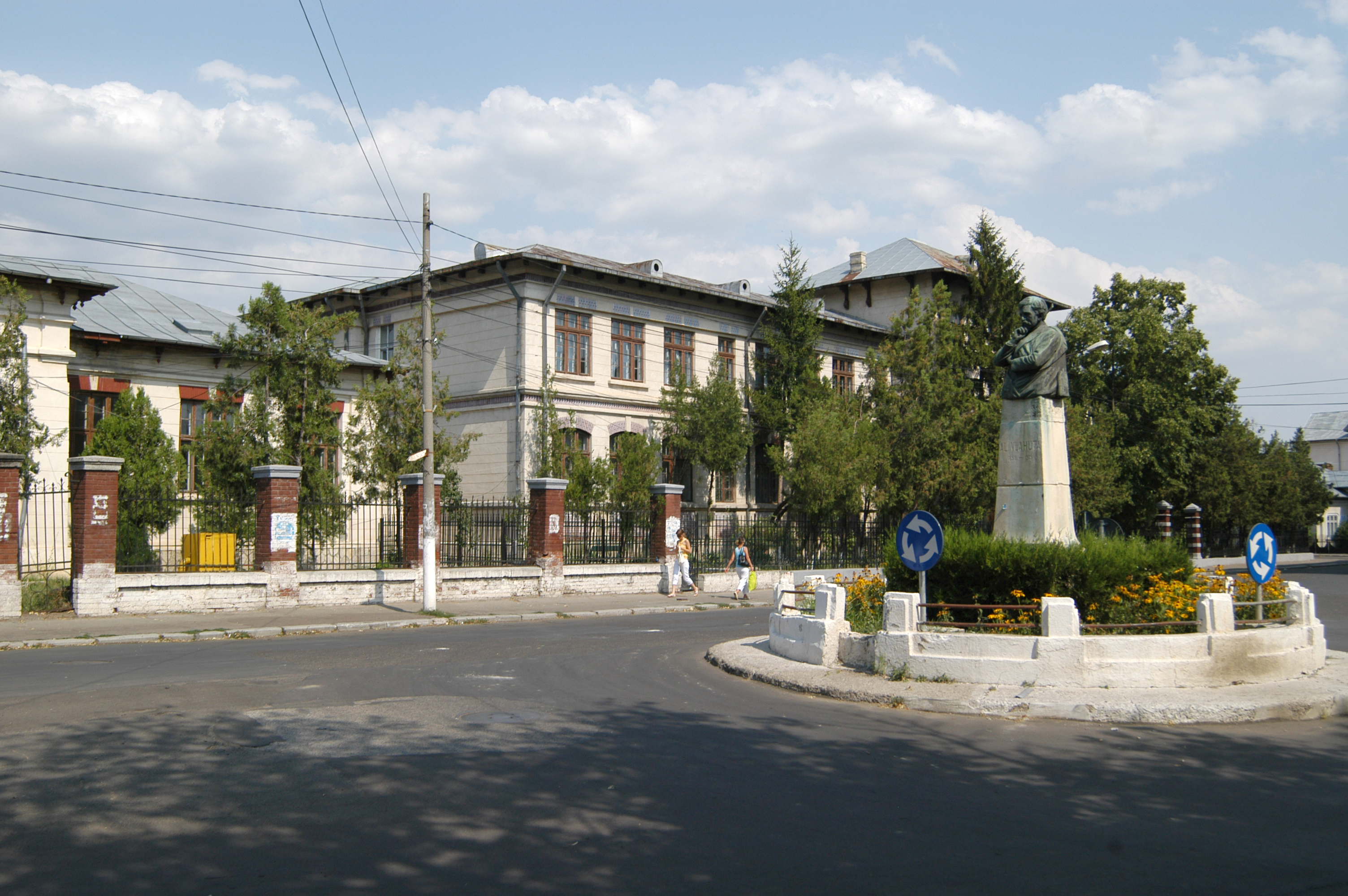
Alexandru Vlahuță National College

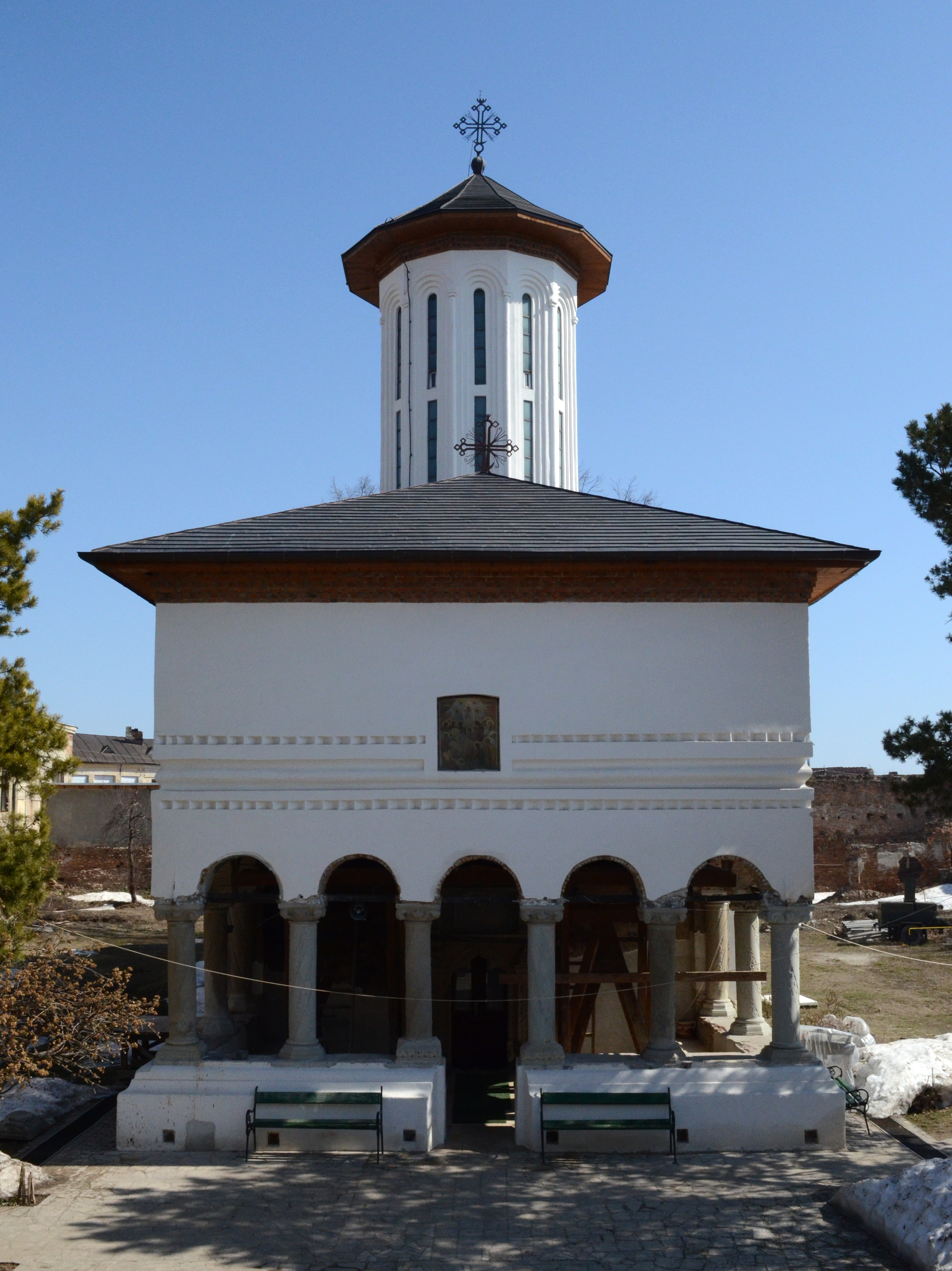
Church of the Assumption of Virgin Mary, built by Constantin Brâncoveanu in 1697
