= List of shipwrecks in October 1942 =

The list of shipwrecks in October 1942 includes all ships sunk, foundered, grounded, or otherwise lost during October 1942.

== 1 October ==
For the sinking of the British cargo ship Siam II on this day, see the entry for 30 September 1942.

List of shipwrecks: 1 October 1942
| Ship | State | Description |
|---|---|---|
| Achilles | Netherlands | World War II: The cargo ship (1,815 GRT) was torpedoed and sunk in the Atlantic Ocean 110 nautical miles (200 km) south east of Trinidad (9°06′N 59°48′W) by U-202 (Kriegsmarine) with the loss of one of her 36 crew. |
| Empire Tennyson | United Kingdom | World War II: The cargo ship (2,880 GRT) was torpedoed and sunk in the Atlantic Ocean 110 nautical miles (200 km) south east of Trinidad (9°27′N 60°05′W) by U-175 (Kriegsmarine) with the loss of four of her 40 crew. Survivors were rescued by USS PG-58 (United States Navy). |
| Katsuragi Maru | Imperial Japanese Navy | World War II: The aircraft ferry (8,033 GRT) was torpedoed and sunk in the Solomon Sea south of Cape St. George, New Ireland (05°38′S 153°08′E) by USS Sturgeon (United States Navy). Two of her crew and 27 gunners were killed. |
| V 2003 Loodsboot 7 | Kriegsmarine | World War II: The Vorpostenboot (303 GRT) was torpedoed and sunk in the North Sea off Terschelling, Friesland, Netherlands (53°31′N 5°05′E) by HMMTB 230 (Royal Navy). 21 crew were killed. |
| M-118 | Soviet Navy | World War II: The M-class submarine (206 GRT) was sunk in the Black Sea off Cape Burnas (45°53′N 30°19′E) by Sublocotenant Ghiculescu and Locotenant-Commandor Stihi Eugen (both Royal Romanian Navy), or the next day by a Luftwaffe aircraft. All 21 crew were lost. |
| HMMGB 18 | Royal Navy | World War II: The motor gun boat (23 GRT) was sunk in the North Sea off Terschelling during an attack on a German convoy. She was heavily damaged by fire from escort ships and then collided with HMMGB 82 (all Royal Navy) and was scuttled. Her whole crew was rescued. |
| Salzburg | Germany | World War II: The transport ship (1,742 GRT) was torpedoed and sunk in the Black Sea east of Lake Shahany (45°54′N 30°19′E) by M-118 (Soviet Navy). She was carrying more than 2,000 Soviet prisoners of war and, depending on sources, between 1,200 and 2,080 of them were lost, together with between two and six Germans. |
| Thule | Sweden | World War II: The cargo ship (1,778 GRT) was torpedoed and sunk in the North Sea off Terschelling (53°36′N 5°10′E) by HMMGB 18, HMMGB 21, HMMGB 81, HMMGB 86, HMMTB 230 and HMMTB 234 (all Royal Navy) with the loss of ten of her 23 crew. |
| Tosei Maru | Japan | World War II: The cargo ship (2,433 GRT) was torpedoed and sunk off Shiriyazaki, Japan (41°20′N 141°35′E) by USS Nautilus (United States Navy) with the loss of one crew member. |
| Yomei Maru | Japan | World War II: The cargo ship was torpedoed and sunk in the Pacific Ocean off Ichiezaki, Japan (33°35′N 135°15′E) by USS Kingfish (United States Navy). 35 crew and 3 gunners were killed. |

== 2 October ==
List of shipwrecks: 2 October 1942
| Ship | State | Description |
|---|---|---|
| Alcoa Transport | United States | World War II: The cargo ship was torpedoed and sunk in the Caribbean Sea 100 nautical miles (190 km) west of Trinidad (9°03′N 60°10′W) by U-201 (Kriegsmarine) with the loss of six of her 36 crew. Survivors were rescued by USS PC-490 (United States Navy). |
| Aneroid | Panama | World War II: The cargo ship was torpedoed and sunk in the Atlantic Ocean 130 nautical miles (240 km) off Georgetown, British Guiana (8°24′N 59°12′W) by U-175 (Kriegsmarine) with the loss of six of her 49 crew. Survivors were rescued by Ivan (Yugoslavia) and Olambura (Honduras). |
| HMS Curacoa | Royal Navy | The Ceres-class cruiser was rammed, cut in half, and sunk north of Ireland (55°50′N 08°38′W) by RMS Queen Mary (United Kingdom). Only 26 of her crew 460 survived. |
| Hans Rolshoven | Kriegsmarine | World War II: The Hans Rolshoven-class seaplane tender was sunk by a mine at Bornholm, Denmark. She was salvaged in July 1943 and towed to Sassnitz. |
| Lisbon Maru | Imperial Japanese Army | World War II: The Lyons Maru-class transport ship, carrying 1,816 British prisoners of war (POWs) and 778 Imperial Japanese Army troops, sank due to torpedo damage inflicted the previous day 20 mi (32 km) north of Chushan Island, China (29°57′N 122°56′E) by USS Grouper (United States Navy). Three guards and 826 POWs were killed; most of the POWs killed were shot by guards while attempting to abandon ship. Troops were rescued by a destroyer, by Toyokuni Maru (Japan), POWs by Chinese junks, along with the auxiliary gunboat Unkai Maru No, 10 (Imperial Japanese Navy) which rescued 57 troops, and the auxiliary transport Hyakufuku Maru (Imperial Japanese Navy) which rescued 348 troops. |
| HMT Lord Stonehaven | Royal Navy | World War II: The naval trawler was torpedoed and sunk in the English Channel off the Eddystone Lighthouse by S-112 (Kriegsmarine) with the loss of all 18 crew. |
| U-512 | Kriegsmarine | World War II: The Type IXC submarine was bombed and sunk in the Atlantic Ocean (6°50′N 52°25′W) by a Douglas B-18 Bolo aircraft of the 99th Bombardment Group, United States Army Air Force, with the loss of 51 of her 52 crew. The survivor was rescued by USS Ellis (United States Navy). |
| T-57 Udarnik | Soviet Navy | World War II: The Udarnik-class minesweeper struck a mine and sank in the Gulf of Finland off Seiskari. |
| Veglia | Italy | World War II: The coaster was torpedoed and shelled in the Adriatic Sea off Korcula, Yugoslavia by HMS Safari (Royal Navy) (42°56′N 17°17′E). She was beached at Sabioncello with four killed, ten wounded and 25 reported missing. The damaged ship was later salvaged but was declared a total loss. |

== 3 October ==
For the sinking of the American tanker Esso Williamsburg on this day, see the entry for 22 September 1942

List of shipwrecks: 3 October 1942
| Ship | State | Description |
|---|---|---|
| Kinkai Maru | Japan | World War II: The cargo ship was torpedoed and sunk in the Pacific Ocean off the coast of Japan (38°46′N 142°02′E) by USS Greenling (United States Navy). |
| HMS MGB 78 | Royal Navy | World War II: The BPB 72 foot-class motor gun boat was shelled and sunk off the Netherlands by Kriegsmarine surface ships. One of her crew was killed. |
| Mikoyan | Soviet Union | World War II: The cargo ship was torpedoed and sunk in the Bay of Bengal by I-162 (Imperial Japanese Navy). Her 99 crew survived. |

== 4 October ==
List of shipwrecks: 4 October 1942
| Ship | State | Description |
|---|---|---|
| Camden | United States | World War II: The tanker was torpedoed and damaged in the Pacific Ocean off the coast of Oregon by I-25 (Imperial Japanese Navy). One of her 48 crew drowned when he jumped overboard. Survivors were rescued by Kookaburra (Sweden). Camden sank under tow on 10 October at 46°47′N 124°31′W. |
| Caribstar | United States | World War II: The cargo ship was torpedoed and sunk in the Atlantic Ocean off the mouth of the Orinoco River, Venezuela (8°30′N 59°37′W) by U-175 (Kriegsmarine) with the loss of six of her 35 crew. Survivors were rescued by USS PC-469 (United States Navy). |
| Robert H. Colley | United States | World War II: Convoy HX 209: The cargo ship was torpedoed by U-254 (Kriegsmarine). She broke in two and the bow section foundered in the Atlantic Ocean (58°57′N 26°20′W) with the loss of eight gunners and 20 of her crew. The stern section remained afloat and was scuttled the next day at 58°44′N 24°54′W by HMS Borage (Royal Navy). HMS Borage also rescued her survivors, nine gunners and 24 crewmen. |
| Setsuyo Maru | Japan | World War II: The cargo shi was torpedoed and sunk in the Pacific Ocean off the coast of Japan by USS Greenling (United States Navy). |
| Willemsplein | Netherlands | The cargo ship was driven ashore near Cape English, Nova Scotia, Canada. She was a total loss. |

== 5 October ==
List of shipwrecks: 5 October 1942
| Ship | State | Description |
|---|---|---|
| Eneo | Italy | World War II: The coaster was torpedoed and damaged in the Adriatic Sea by HMS Safari (Royal Navy). She put into Split, Yugoslavia. Two tugs were sent to her assistance. They rescued 173 survivors (including 43 seriously wounded). There were 35 killed and 16 missing. She was not repaired until after the end of the war. |
| F 138 | Kriegsmarine | World War II: The Type A Marinefahrprahm was damaged beyond repair in the Black Sea off Ak-Burnu by a German mine and was towed to Kertch, Soviet Union, or sank while under tow. There were two wounded. |
| Larry Doheny | United States | World War II: The tanker was torpedoed and damaged in the Pacific Ocean (42°20′N 125°02′W) off the coast of Oregon by I-25 (Imperial Japanese Navy). Four gunners and two crew were killed. Survivors rescued by USS Coos Bay (United States Navy). Larry Doheny sank the next day. |
| SG-12 Pommern | Kriegsmarine | World War II: The minelayer struck a mine and sank 1 1/2 nautical miles (2.8 km) south of Sanremo, Italy. |
| U-582 | Kriegsmarine | World War II: The Type VIIC submarine was depth charged and sunk in the Atlantic Ocean southwest of Iceland (58°52′N 21°42′W) by a Consolidated PBY Catalina aircraft of the United States Navy with the loss of all 46 crew. |
| U-619 | Kriegsmarine | World War II: The Type VIIC submarine was depth charged and sunk in the Atlantic Ocean southwest of Iceland (58°41′N 22°58′W) by a Lockheed Hudson aircraft of 269 Squadron, Royal Air Force with the loss of all 44 crew. |
| William A. McKenney | United States | World War II: The cargo ship was torpedoed, shelled and sunk in the Atlantic Ocean 50 nautical miles (93 km) east of Corocoro Island, Venezuela (8°35′N 59°20′W) by U-175 (Kriegsmarine) with the loss of one of her 35 crew. Survivors were rescued by USS Blakeley (United States Navy). |

== 6 October ==
List of shipwrecks: 6 October 1942
| Ship | State | Description |
|---|---|---|
| Empire Tarpon | United Kingdom | The cargo ship was in distress in the Atlantic Ocean 500 nautical miles (930 km) west of Lewis, Outer Hebrides (57°20′N 15°09′W). She was taken in tow but was abandoned on 13 October. She capsized and sank the next day 20 nautical miles (37 km) west of South Uist, Outer Hebrides (57°24′N 7°45′W). |
| I-22 | Imperial Japanese Navy | World War II: The Type C1 submarine was depth charged and sunk in the Coral Sea south east of San Cristobal Island (11°22′S 162°20′E) by a United States Navy Consolidated PBY Catalina aircraft with the loss of all 100 hands. |
| HMMGB 76 | Royal Navy | World War II: The BPB 72 foot-class motor gun boat was shelled and sunk in the North Sea by Kriegsmarine Schnellboote. |
| HMMTB 29 | Royal Navy | World War II: The BPB 70 foot-class motor torpedo boat was sunk in a collision in the North Sea with a Kriegsmarine Schnellboot. |
| Mina Daniel | Romania | World War II: The tug was torpedoed and sunk in the Black Sea north east of Sulina (45°47′N 30°19′E) by M-31 (Soviet Navy). |
| Taku | United States | The motor vessel was wrecked on the north end of Kayak Island, Territory of Alaska. |

== 7 October ==
List of shipwrecks: 7 October 1942
| Ship | State | Description |
|---|---|---|
| Andalucia Star | United Kingdom | World War II: The cargo liner was torpedoed and sunk in the Atlantic Ocean off Cape Palmas, Liberia (6°38′N 15°46′W) by U-107 (Kriegsmarine) with the loss of four of the 252 people on board. Survivors were rescued by HMS Petunia (Royal Navy). |
| Boringia | United Kingdom | World War II: The cargo ship was torpedoed and sunk in the South Atlantic 130 nautical miles (240 km) south west of Cape Town, Union of South Africa (35°09′S 16°32′E) by U-159 (Kriegsmarine) with the loss of 25 of her 60 crew. Survivors were rescued by Matheran and Clan Mactavish (both United Kingdom). |
| HMS Caroline Moller | Royal Navy | World War II: Convoy FN 32: The Saint-class tug was torpedoed and sunk in the North Sea 12 nautical miles (22 km) north east of Cromer, Norfolk by S-80 (Kriegsmarine) with the loss of three of her crew. |
| Chickasaw City | United States | World War II: The cargo ship was torpedoed and sunk in the South Atlantic]85 nautical miles (157 km) south south west of Cape Town (34°15′S 17°11′E) by U-172 (Kriegsmarine) with the loss of ten of her 49 crew. Survivors were rescued by HMS Rockrose (Royal Navy). |
| Elbe | Germany | World War II: The tug was sunk by Allied action. |
| Firethorn | Panama | World War II: The cargo ship was torpedoed and sunk in the South Atlantic 60 nautical miles (110 km) north west of Cape Town (34°10′S 17°07′E) by U-172 (Kriegsmarine) with the loss of 12 of her 61 crew. Survivors were rescued by HMS Rockrose (Royal Navy) and HMSAS Springs ( (United Kingdom) South African Navy). |
| Ightham | United Kingdom | World War II: The cargo ship struck a mine and sank in the North Sea off the coast of Yorkshire. |
| Ilse | United Kingdom | World War II: Convoy FN 32: The cargo ship was torpedoed and sunk in the North Sea 12 nautical miles (22 km) off Cromer by S 105 (Kriegsmarine). |
| Jessie Maersk | United Kingdom | World War II: Convoy FN 32: The cargo ship was torpedoed and sunk in the North Sea 12 nautical miles (22 km) off Cromer (53°06′00″N 1°24′30″E) by S 117 (Kriegsmarine) with the loss of 20 of her 29 crew. The wreck was subsequently dispersed. |
| HMML 339 | Royal Navy | World War II: Convoy FN 32: The Fairmile B motor launch was torpedoed and sunk in the North Sea 12 nautical miles (22 km) off Cromer by S-62 (Kriegsmarine. |
| Manon | United Kingdom | World War II: The cargo ship was torpedoed and sunk east south east of Masulipatam, India (15°00′N 80°30′E) by I-162 (Imperial Japanese Navy) in the Indian Ocean 400 miles (640 km). Eight of her crew were killed. Survivors sailed in lifeboats to Pallaur, India. |
| Milcrest | United Kingdom | The cargo ship collided with Empire Lightning (United Kingdom) and sank in the Atlantic Ocean 60 nautical miles (110 km) off Halifax, Nova Scotia, Canada (43°53′N 62°25′W). |
| Naminoue Maru | Imperial Japanese Army | World War II: Oki Transportation Movement: Convoy Oki Part 1: The Naminoue Maru-class auxiliary troopship was torpedoed and sunk in the Pacific Ocean off Rabaul, New Britain Papua New Guinea (3°14′S 150°01′E) by USS Sculpin (United States Navy). There were 279 survivors. They were rescued by Takanami (Imperial Japanese Navy). Two people were killed. |
| Senkai Maru | Imperial Japanese Navy | World War II: The Senkai Maru-class auxiliary stores ship was torpedoed and sunk in the Pacific Ocean off Kavieng, New Ireland, Papua New Guinea (1°55′N 153°42′E) by USS Amberjack (United States Navy). Three of her crew were killed. |
| Sheaf Water | United Kingdom | World War II: Convoy FN 32: The cargo ship was torpedoed and sunk in the North Sea 12 nautical miles (22 km) off Cromer (52°48′04″N 01°37′02″E) by S 46 (Kriegsmarine) Her 29 crew survived. |

== 8 October ==
List of shipwrecks: 8 October 1942
| Ship | State | Description |
|---|---|---|
| City of Athens | United Kingdom | World War II: The cargo ship was torpedoed and sunk in the South Atlantic 60 nautical miles (110 km) west north west of Cape Town, Union of South Africa (33°40′S 17°03′E) by U-179 (Kriegsmarine) with the loss of one of the 99 people on board. Survivors were rescued by HMS Active (Royal Navy). |
| Clan Mactavish | United Kingdom | World War II: The cargo ship was torpedoed and sunk in the South Atlantic 100 nautical miles (190 km) west south west of Cape Town (34°53′S 16°45′E) by U-159 (Kriegsmarine) with the loss of 61 of the 128 people on board, including eight survivors from Boringia (United Kingdom). Survivors were rescued by Matheran (United Kingdom). |
| Dandolo | Italy | World War II: The cargo ship was torpedoed and sunk in the Mediterranean Sea 60 nautical miles (110 km) off Ras el Tin, Egypt by British aircraft. There were no casualties. |
| Gaasterkerk | Netherlands | World War II: The cargo ship was torpedoed and sunk in the Atlantic Ocean 15 nautical miles (28 km) west of the Cape of Good Hope, South Africa (34°20′S 18°10′E) by U-68 (Kriegsmarine). Her 64 crew were rescued by HMAS Nizam (Royal Australian Navy). |
| Glendene | United Kingdom | World War II: The cargo ship was torpedoed and sunk in the Atlantic Ocean 300 nautical miles (560 km) south west of Freetown, Sierra Leone (4°29′N 17°41′W) by U-125 (Kriegsmarine) with the loss of five of her 43 crew. Survivors were rescued by Agapenor (United Kingdom). |
| Hague Maru | Japan | World War II: The Hague Maru-class cargo ship was torpedoed and sunk in the Pacific Ocean off the eastern coast of Kyūshū (34°01′N 135°06′E) by USS Drum (United States Navy). Five of her crew were killed. |
| John Carter Rose | United States | World War II: The Liberty ship was torpedoed, shelled and sunk in the Caribbean Sea (10°27′N 45°37′W) by U-201 and U-202 (both Kriegsmarine) with the loss of eight of her 61 crew. Survivors were rescued by Santa Cruz (Argentina) and West Humhaw (United States). |
| Koumoundouros | Greece | World War II: The cargo ship was torpedoed and sunk in the Atlantic Ocean 20 nautical miles (37 km) south west of Cape Point, Union of South Africa (34°10′S 17°07′E) by U-68 (Kriegsmarine) with the loss of five of her 36 crew. Survivors were rescued by HMS Foxhound (Royal Navy) and HMAS Nizam (Royal Australian Navy). |
| Kreta | Germany | World War II: The cargo ship (853 GRT) was torpedoed and sunk in the Mediterranean Sea off the coast of Libya (33°03′N 22°13′E) by HMS Turbulent (Royal Navy). A crew member was lost. |
| RO 46 Lauterfels | Kriegsmarine | World War II: The troopship struck a mine and sank in the North Sea off Terschelling, Friesland, Netherlands (53°34′N 5°05′E). |
| Lupa | Italy | World War II: The cargo ship was shelled and sunk in the Mediterranean Sea (33°41′N 11°44′E) by HMS Unbending (Royal Navy). Two of her crew were wounded. |
| Pantelis | Greece | World War II: The cargo ship was torpedoed and sunk in the Atlantic Ocean 40 nautical miles (74 km) south west of Cape Town (34°20′S 17°50′E) by U-172 (Kriegsmarine) with the loss of 28 of her 33 crew. Survivors were rescued by HMS Rockrose (Royal Navy). |
| V 6102 Polarstern | Kriegsmarine | World War II: The Polarstern-class naval whaler capsized and sank in dock at Moss, Norway. She was raised 24 October 1942. Subsequently repaired and returned to service. |
| R 77, R 78, R 82, and R 86 | Kriegsmarine | World War II: The R 41-class R boats were sunk by mines in the North Sea off Dunkerque, Nord, France (51°02′N 1°22′E). |
| Sarthe | United Kingdom | World War II: The cargo ship was torpedoed and sunk in the Atlantic Ocean 35 nautical miles (65 km) south south west of the Cape of Good Hope, Union of South Africa (34°50′S 18°40′E) by U-68 (Kriegsmarine). Her 57 crew were rescued by HMSAS Vereeniging (South African Navy). |
| Swiftsure | United States | World War II: The tanker was torpedoed and sunk in the Atlantic Ocean 25 nautical miles (46 km) south east of the Cape of Good Hope (34°40′S 18°25′E) by U-68 (Kriegsmarine). Her 33 crew were rescued by a Royal Navy minesweeper. |
| U-179 | Kriegsmarine | World War II: The Type IXD2 submarine was depth charged and sunk in the South Atlantic off Cape Town (33°28′S 17°05′E) by HMS Active (Royal Navy) with the loss of all 61 crew. |
| Varøy | Norway | World War II: Convoy FN 33: The cargo ship collided with Francis Fladgate (United Kingdom) and sank in the North Sea (52°58′24″N 1°28′45″E). Her 23 crew were rescued by HMML 201 (Royal Navy). |
| No. 21 | Soviet Navy | The No. 33-class armored motor gunboat was lost on this date. |

== 9 October ==
List of shipwrecks: 9 October 1942
| Ship | State | Description |
|---|---|---|
| Alga | Italy | World War II: The cargo ship (1,851 GRT) was torpedoed and sunk in the Mediterranean Sea off Djerba, Tunisia (34°02′N 11°05′E) by HMS Unbending (Royal Navy) with the loss of 44 of her 52 crew. |
| Belgian Fighter | Belgium | World War II: The cargo ship was torpedoed and sunk in the Atlantic Ocean 75 nautical miles (139 km) south of Cape Town, Union of South Africa (35°00′S 18°30′E) by U-68 (Kriegsmarine) with the loss of five of her 59 crew. Survivors were rescued by John Lykes (United States) and Ocean Justice (United Kingdom). |
| BK-31 | Soviet Navy | World War II: Battle of Stalingrad: The armoured motor gunboat was shelled and sunk in the Volga River at Stalingrad by German artillery. Four of her crew were killed. The wreck was salvaged in 2017 for restoration as a memorial. |
| Carolus | Canada | World War II: Convoy NL 9: The cargo ship was torpedoed and sunk in the Gulf of St. Lawrence (48°47′N 68°10′W) by U-69 with the loss of 11 of her 30 crew. Survivors were rescued by HMCS Arrowhead and HMCS Hepatica (both Royal Canadian Navy). |
| Charlotte B. | United States | The fishing vessel sank after striking a reef in the Geese Island Channel (56°45′N 153°53′W) at the southern end of Kodiak Island, Territory of Alaska. |
| Coloradan | United States | World War II: The cargo ship was torpedoed and sunk in the South Atlantic 200 nautical miles (370 km) south west of Cape Town (35°47′S 14°34′E) by U-159 (Kriegsmarine) with the loss of six of her 54 crew. 23 survivors were rescued by HMS Active (Royal Navy) on 11 October, and 25 by a South African fishing vessel on 19 October. |
| Examelia | United States | World War II: The Design 1022 ship was torpedoed and sunk in the Atlantic Ocean 20 nautical miles (37 km) south of the Cape of Good Hope, Union of South Africa (34°52′S 18°30′E) by U-68 (Kriegsmarine) with the loss of 11 of her 51 crew. Survivors were rescued by John Lykes (United States). |
| Flensburg | Netherlands | World War II: The cargo ship was torpedoed and sunk in the Atlantic Ocean 500 nautical miles (930 km) off the coast of Surinam (10°45′N 46°48′W) by U-201 (Kriegsmarine). Her 48 crew were rescued by HNLMS Prinses Juliana (Royal Netherlands Navy). |
| Hachimanzan Maru | Japan | World War II: The cargo ship was torpedoed and sunk in the Pacific Ocean off the eastern coast of Kyūshū by USS Drum (United States Navy). |
| Oronsay | United Kingdom | World War II: The ocean liner was torpedoed and sunk in the Atlantic Ocean 800 nautical miles (1,500 km) south west of Monrovia, Liberia (4°29′N 20°52′W) by Archimede (Regia Marina) with the loss of five of the 48 people on board. 26 of the survivors were taken as prisoners of war. |
| Pennington Court | United Kingdom | World War II: Convoy SC 103: The cargo ship straggled behind the convoy. She was torpedoed and sunk in the Atlantic Ocean (58°18′N 27°55′W) by U-254 (Kriegsmarine) with the loss of all 45 crew. |
| Proserpina | Italy | World War II: The tanker was torpedoed and sunk in the Mediterranean Sea (35°45′N 23°13′E) by HMS Traveller (Royal Navy). |
| Sperrbrecher 143 Lola | Kriegsmarine | World War II: The sperrbrecher struck a mine and sank in the North Sea off Nieuwpoort, West Flanders, Belgium (51°13′N 2°44′E). One source says five of her crew were killed, another says there were no casualties. |
| U-171 | Kriegsmarine | World War II: The Type IXC submarine struck a mine and sank in the Bay of Biscay off Lorient, Morbihan, France (47°39′N 3°34′W) with the loss of 22 of her 52 crew. |

== 10 October ==
List of shipwrecks: 10 October 1942
| Ship | State | Description |
|---|---|---|
| Atlas | Netherlands | The ship was wrecked on Lundy Island, Devon, United Kingdom with the loss of eight of her nine crew. |
| Balaklava | Soviet Union | World War II: The cargo ship was sunk in a Luftwaffe air raid on "Chopi". |
| Carpati | Germany | World War II: The cargo ship was torpedoed and sunk off the mouth of the Sulina River (44°57′N 29°47′E) by Shch-216 (Soviet Navy). Three of her 50 crew were lost. |
| Duchess of Atholl | United Kingdom | World War II: The ocean liner was torpedoed and sunk in the South Atlantic 200 nautical miles (370 km) east north east of Ascension Island (7°03′S 11°12′W) by U-178 (Kriegsmarine) with the loss of five of the 832 people on board. Survivors were rescued by HMS Corinthian (Royal Navy). |
| Enrichetta | Italy | World War II: The cargo shi was torpedoed and sunk in the Mediterranean Sea west of the Peloponnese, Greece (37°11′N 21°26′E) by HMS Unison (Royal Navy) with the loss of 88 of the 151 people on board. |
| Kamishi | Soviet Union | World War II: The cargo ship was sunk in a Luftwaffe air raid on "Chopi". |
| Lepse | Soviet Union | World War II: The cargo ship was sunk in a Luftwaffe air raid on "Chopi". |
| MO-175 | Soviet Navy | World War II: The patrol boat was shelled and sunk by Kriegsmarine Siebel ferries in Lake Ladoga near Sukho Island. Nine of her crew were rescued and made prisoners of war. |
| HMT Orcades | Royal Navy | World War II: The troopship was torpedoed and sunk in the South Atlantic 220 nautical miles (410 km) southwest of Cape Town, Union of South Africa (35°51′S 14°40′E) by U-172 (Kriegsmarine) with the loss of 45 of the 1,067 people on board. Survivors were rescued by Narwik (Poland). |
| Shigure Maru | Japan | World War II: The transport ship was torpedoed and sunk in the South China Sea off Samarinda, Borneo, Netherlands East Indies (01°01′S 117°22′E) by USS Seadragon (United States Navy). |
| Tonan Maru No. 2 | Imperial Japanese Navy | World War II: The Tonan Maru No. 2-class auxiliary oiler was torpedoed and sunk in shallow water inside Kavieng Harbour, New Ireland, Papua New Guinea by USS Amberjack (United States Navy). She had been refloated by the end of November, and returned to service by end of the year. |

== 11 October ==
List of shipwrecks: 11 October 1942
| Ship | State | Description |
|---|---|---|
| Agapenor | United Kingdom | World War II: The cargo ship was torpedoed and sunk in the Atlantic Ocean (6°53′N 15°23′W) by U-87 (Kriegsmarine) with the loss of seven of her 95 crew. The survivors, and all 38 survivors from Glendene (United Kingdom) were rescued by HMS Petunia (Royal Navy). |
| El Lago | Panama | World War II: Convoy ONS 136: The cargo ship straggled behind the convoy. She was torpedoed and sunk in the Atlantic Ocean (51°03′N 46°15′W) by U-615 (Kriegsmarine) with the loss of 57 of her 59 crew. Survivors were rescued by U-615 and made prisoners of war. |
| Fubuki | Imperial Japanese Navy | World War II: Battle of Cape Esperance: The Fubuki-class destroyer was shelled and sunk off Cape Esperance, Guadalcanal by ships of Task Force 64, United States Navy,^{[note 1]} with the loss of 110 of her 219 crew. Survivors were rescued by USS Hovey, USS McCalla and USS Trever (all United States Navy). |
| Furutaka | Imperial Japanese Navy | World War II: Battle of Cape Esperance: The Furutaka-class cruiser was torpedoed, shelled, damaged off Cape Esperance by ships of Task Force 64, United States Navy. She sank just after midnight on 12 October 22 miles (35 km) north west of Savo Island (09°02′N 159°33′E), with the loss of 33 or 101 of her 616 crew. Her captain and 517 other survivors were rescued by Hatsuyuki, Murakumo and Shirayuki (all Imperial Japanese Navy). The other 115 survivors were rescued by American ships and taken as prisoners of war. |
| L-16 | Soviet Navy | World War II: The Leninets-class submarine was torpedoed and sunk in the Pacific Ocean 500 nautical miles (930 km; 580 mi) west of Seattle, Washington, United States (45°41′N 128°56′W) by I-25 (Imperial Japanese Navy) with the loss of all 50 hands. |
| Laos | France | World War II: The cargo ship foundered east of Tiền Hải, French Indochina (20°23′N 106°56′E). |
| Regensburg | Germany | World War II: The cargo ship was torpedoed and damaged in the Sunda Strait by USS Searaven (United States Navy) and was beached. She was subsequently towed to Singapore for repairs. |
| SKR-23 Musson | Soviet Navy | World War II: The naval trawler struck a mine and sank in the Barents Sea 5 nautical miles (9.3 km) off Chernyj Kame Island in the Matochkin Shar Strait (73°15′N 54°17′E) with the loss of 25 of her 48 crew. |
| HMS Thalia | Royal Navy | The armed trawler was lost following a collision with an unknown merchant vessel, resulting in her sinking in deep water south of Creag Island in the Lynn of Lorne, Scotland. |
| Una | Italy | World War II: The cargo ship was torpedoed and sunk off Capri by HMS Unruffled (Royal Navy). Two men were reported missing, 45 survivors were rescued, including 14 wounded. |
| Waterton | United Kingdom | World War II: Convoy BS 31: The cargo ship was torpedoed and sunk in the Gulf of St Lawrence north of Cape Breton Island, Nova Scotia, Canada (47°07′N 59°54′W) by U-106 (Kriegsmarine). Her 27 crew were rescued by HMCS Vison (Royal Canadian Navy). |

== 12 October ==
List of shipwrecks: 12 October 1942
| Ship | State | Description |
|---|---|---|
| Bringhi | Egypt | World War II: The sailing ship was machine gunned and damaged in the Mediterranean Sea off Alexandria by U-559 (Kriegsmarine). She was beached on a reef and was declared a total loss. |
| USS Duncan | United States Navy | World War II: Battle of Cape Esperance: The Gleaves-class destroyer sank in the Pacific Ocean 5 nautical miles (9.3 km) north of Savo Island following battle damage inflicted by Furutaka (Imperial Japanese Navy) with the loss of 81 of her 276 crew. |
| Murakumo | Imperial Japanese Navy | World War II: Battle of Cape Esperance: Whilst retiring from the battle, the destroyer was bombed and severely damaged by American aircraft from Henderson Field, Guadalcanal, Solomon Islands. She was scuttled by Shirayuki (Imperial Japanese Navy) 90 nautical miles (170 km) west north west of Savo Island. |
| Natsugumo | Imperial Japanese Navy | World War II: Battle of Cape Esperance: Whilst retiring from the battle, the destroyer was bombed and sunk by American aircraft from Henderson Field, 90 nautical miles (170 km) west north west of Savo Island. |
| Shch-311 | Soviet Navy | World War II: The Shchuka-class submarine was sunk in the Gulf of Finland by patrol boats VMV 13 and VMV 15 (both Finnish Navy). |
| Steel Scientist | United States | World War II: The cargo ship was torpedoed and sunk in the Atlantic Ocean 95 nautical miles (176 km) north of Cayenne, French Guiana (5°48′N 51°50′W) by U-514 (Kriegsmarine) with the loss of one of her 47 crew. Survivors sailed in lifeboats to British Guyana, arriving on 19 and 20 October. |
| Stornest | United Kingdom | World War II: Convoy ONS 136: The cargo ship straggled behind the convoy. She was torpedoed and sunk in the Atlantic Ocean (54°25′N 27°42′W) by U-706 (Kriegsmarine) with the loss of all 49 crew. |
| U-597 | Kriegsmarine | World War II: The Type VIIC submarine was depth charged and sunk in the Atlantic Ocean south west of Iceland (56°50′N 28°05′W) by a Consolidated B-24 Liberator aircraft of 120 Squadron, Royal Air Force with the loss of all 49 crew. |

== 13 October ==
List of shipwrecks: 13 October 1942
| Ship | State | Description |
|---|---|---|
| Ashworth | United Kingdom | World War II: Convoy SC 104: The cargo ship was torpedoed and sunk in the Atlantic Ocean 500 nautical miles (930 km) east of the Belle Isle Strait (53°05′N 44°06′W) by U-221 (Kriegsmarine) with the loss of all 49 crew. |
| Empire Nomad | United Kingdom | World War II: The cargo ship was torpedoed and sunk in the Atlantic Ocean off the coast of the Union of South Africa (37°50′S 18°16′E) by U-159 (Kriegsmarine) with the loss of seven of her 53 crew. Survivors were rescued by Elisha Walker (Panama), HMAS Norman (Royal Australian Navy) and Tynebank (United Kingdom). |
| Fagersten | Norway | World War II: Convoy SC 104: The cargo ship was torpedoed and sunk in the Atlantic Ocean 500 nautical miles (930 km) east of the Belle Isle Strait (53°05′N 44°06′W) by U-221 (Kriegsmarine) with the loss of 19 of her 29 crew. Survivors were rescued by HMS Potentilla (Royal Navy). |
| I-30 | Imperial Japanese Navy | World War II: The Type B1 submarine was sunk by a mine 3 miles (4.8 km) east of Keppel Harbor, Singapore. 13 of her crew were killed; 96 crew and her commanding officer were rescued. |
| Loreto | Italy | World War II: the cargo ship was torpedoed and sunk by HMS Unruffled (Royal Navy) west of Palermo, Sicily, killing 123 British Indian Army prisoners of war and an Italian soldier. There were 321 survivors. |
| Nautilus | Italy | World War II: The tanker was torpedoed and sunk off Capo Figari by HMS Utmost (Royal Navy). There were Three dead and 29 survivors. |
| Senta | Norway | World War II: Convoy SC 104: The cargo ship was torpedoed and sunk in the Atlantic Ocean 500 nautical miles (930 km) east of the Belle Isle Strait (approximately 53°N 44°W) by U-221 (Kriegsmarine) with the loss of all 35 crew. |
| Shch-318 | Soviet Navy | The Shchuka-class submarine collided with the Volodarsky Bridge, Leningrad and was damaged. She was subsequently repaired and returned to service. |

== 14 October ==
List of shipwrecks: 14 October 1942
| Ship | State | Description |
|---|---|---|
| Azumasan Maru | Imperial Japanese Navy | World War II: First Assault Convoy for Tassafaronga, Guadalcanal: The Azumasan Maru-class transport ship was bombed by American Boeing B-17 Flying Fortress aircraft from Espiritu Santo, New Hebrides. She was burned out and beached. The wreck was bombed again by B-17 aircraft from Esperitu Santo on 15 October, the ship slid off the reef and sank 2 nautical miles (3.7 km) southeast of Bunina Point, Tassafaronga (09°21′S 159°52′E). |
| Caribou | Dominion of Newfoundland | World War II: The passenger ferry was torpedoed and sunk in the Cabot Strait (47°19′N 59°29′W) by U-69 (Kriegsmarine) with the loss of 136 of the 237 people on board. |
| Edward Schenk | United States | The tug (18 GRT) sank with the loss of all hands near Tree Point (54°48′15″N 130°55′45″W), between Ketchikan, Territory of Alaska, and Prince Rupert, British Columbia, Canada. |
| Empire Mersey | United Kingdom | World War II: Convoy SC 104: The cargo ship was torpedoed and sunk in the Atlantic Ocean south south east of Cape Farewell, Greenland (54°00′N 40°15′W) by U-618 (Kriegsmarine) with the loss of 16 of her 55 crew. Survivors were rescued by Gothland (United Kingdom) |
| George Balfour | United Kingdom | World War II: The cargo ship was torpedoed and damaged in the North Sea off Cromer, Norfolk by S69, S71, S73, S74, S75 and S76 (all Kriegsmarine). She was taken in tow but consequently broke in two and sank. She was raised, repaired, and returned to service in 1944. |
| Jacobus Fritzen | Germany | World War II: The cargo ship was torpedoed and sunk at Ystad, Sweden by D-2 (Soviet Navy) with the loss of a crew member and three others wounded. Also reported as striking a mine and sinking north of Cap Arkona. |
| Komet | Kriegsmarine | World War II: The auxiliary cruiser was torpedoed and sunk in the English Channel off La Hague, Manche, France by HMMTB 236 (Royal Navy) with the loss of all hands. |
| Kyushu Maru | Imperial Japanese Army | World War II: First Assault Convoy for Tassafaronga, Guadalcanal: The Kyushu Maru-class transport ship was bombed by American aircraft off Tassafaronga. She was beached and burned out. The vessel was bombed again by Boeing B-17 Flying Fortress aircraft from Esperitu Santo on 15 October and sank two miles (3.2 km) southeast of Bunina Point, Tassafaronga (09°21′S 159°52′E). |
| HMS LCM 611, HMS LCM 613, HMS LCM 632, HMS LCM 633, HMS LCM 634, and HMS LCM 636 | Royal Navy | World War II: The Landing Craft, Mechanized were reported lost on this day, cause unknown. |
| Nellie | Greece | World War II: Convoy SC 104: The cargo ship was torpedoed and sunk in the Atlantic Ocean (53°41′N 41°23′W) by U-607 (Kriegsmarine) with the loss of 32 of her 37 crew. Survivors were rescued by Gothland (United Kingdom). |
| Nikolina Matkovic | Yugoslavia | World War II: Convoy SC 104: The cargo ship was torpedoed and sunk in the Atlantic Ocean (53°41′N 41°23′W) by U-661 (Kriegsmarine) with the loss of 14 of her 35 crew. |
| Sasako Maru | Imperial Japanese Army | World War II: First Assault Convoy for Tassafaronga, Guadalcanal: The Sakito Maru-class auxiliary transport was bombed off Tassafaronga by a Douglas SBD Dauntless or a Consolidated PBY Catalina aircraft of the US "Cactus" Air Force from Guadalcanal. She was beached and burned out (09°30′S 160°00′E). 85 of her crew survived. |
| Shch-213 | Soviet Navy | World War II: The Shchuka-class submarine struck a mine and sank in the Black Sea off Tulcea, Romania. |
| Shch-302 | Soviet Navy | World War II: The Shchuka-class submarine was bombed and sunk in the Gulf of Finland by Finnish Air Force aircraft with the loss of all hands. |
| Shchors | Soviet Union | World War II: The cargo ship struck a mine and was damaged in the Yugor Strait (69°45′N 60°45′E). She was taken in tow by T-879 and T-905 (both Soviet Navy) but foundered at 69°38′N 60°09′E). Her crew survived. |
| Syunko Maru | Imperial Japanese Army | World War II: The Eastern Shore-class auxiliary transport was torpedoed and sunk in the Pacific Ocean off Palau (04°36′N 146°59′E) by USS Skipjack (United States Navy). All on board evacuate on three lifeboats and a Daihatsu landing barge. They arrived at Toasu Island on 21 October and were rescued by an unknown submarine chaser on 28 October. |
| Southern Empress | United Kingdom | World War II: Convoy SC 104: The whale factory ship was torpedoed and sunk in the Atlantic Ocean north east of St. John's, Dominion of Newfoundland (53°40′N 40°40′W) by U-221 (Kriegsmarine) with the loss of 48 of her 125 crew. Survivors were rescued by HMS Potentilla (Royal Navy). Ten landing craft carried as deck cargo were also lost.^{[note 2]} |
| Sumiyoshi Maru | Japan | World War II: The cargo ship was torpedoed and sunk in the Pacific Ocean south west of Kavieng, New Ireland, Papua New Guinea (3°51′S 151°21′E) by USS Sculpin (United States Navy). Eight of her crew were killed. |
| Susana | United States | World War II: Convoy SC 104: The cargo ship was sunk by torpedo in the Atlantic Ocean northeast of St. John's (53°41′N 41°23′W) by U-221 (Kriegsmarine) with the loss of 38 of her 59 crew. Survivors were rescued by Gothland (United Kingdom). |
| Takusei Maru | Japan | World War II: The cargo ship was torpedoed and sunk in the Pacific Ocean off the coast of Japan by USS Greenling (United States Navy). |
| Teison Maru | Japan | World War II: The troopship was torpedoed and damaged in the Formosa Straits 100 nautical miles (190 km) off Kirun, Formosa, China (25°20′N 121°25′E) by USS Finback (United States Navy). The entire crew were rescued, without suffering any casualties, by Chohukusan Maru (Imperial Japanese Navy). Teison Maru sank on 17 October at 25°20′N 121°01′E. |

== 15 October ==
List of shipwrecks: 15 October 1942
| Ship | State | Description |
|---|---|---|
| Amsterdam | Italy | World War II: The cargo ship was torpedoed and damaged in the Mediterranean Sea north of Misrata, Libya by British aircraft. She was towed to Khoms by Circe (Regia Marina). Amsterdam was torpedoed and sunk on 23 October by HMS Umbra (Royal Navy). |
| Batavier III | Kriegsmarine | World War II: The 2,287-ton convoy rescue ship and troop transport was sunk by a mine south of Aalborg, Denmark with all hands. |
| Borneo Maru | Imperial Japanese Army | World War II: The Celebes Maru No. 1-class transport ship was bombed and damaged off Western Beach, Kiska, Territory of Alaska (51°56′N 177°27′E), by aircraft of the United States Eleventh Air Force. She was beached and abandoned in Gertrude Cove. Bombed again and burned out on 21 October. Reportedly her hulk was still (partially?) afloat until sinking sometime post war. |
| Drazki | Bulgarian Navy | The torpedo boat sank at Varna, due to a magazine explosion. She was refloated and repaired. |
| Kyusyu Maru | Japan | World War II: The cargo ship was attacked by United States Army Air Force, United States Marine and United States Navy aircraft in the Pacific Ocean (9°25′S 159°55′E). She was beached and was consequently declared a total loss. |
| USS Meredith | United States Navy | World War II: The Gleaves-class destroyer was torpedoed, bombed and sunk in the Pacific Ocean off Guadalcanal (11°53′S 163°20′E) by Japanese aircraft with the loss of 180 of her 261 crew. Survivors were rescued by USS Grayson, USS Gwin, USS Seminole and a Consolidated PBY Catalina aircraft (all United States Navy). |
| Newton Pine | United Kingdom | World War II: Convoy ONS 136: The cargo ship straggled behind the convoy. She was torpedoed and sunk in the Atlantic Ocean by U-410 (Kriegsmarine) with the loss of all 46 crew. |
| U-661 | Kriegsmarine | World War II: The Type VIIC submarine was rammed and sunk in the Atlantic Ocean (53°42′N 35°56′W) by HMS Viscount (Royal Navy) with the loss of all 44 crew. |

== 16 October ==
List of shipwrecks: 16 October 1942
| Ship | State | Description |
|---|---|---|
| 10V3 Byron | Kriegsmarine | The naval trawler was lost on this date. |
| HMS Castle Harbour | Royal Navy | World War II: Convoy TRIN 19: The coaster was torpedoed and sunk in the Caribbean Sea 50 nautical miles (93 km) east north east of Trinidad (11°00′N 61°10′W) by U-160 (Kriegsmarine) with the loss of nine of her 23 crew. Survivors were rescued by USS SC-53 (United States Navy). |
| HMIS Lady Craddock | Royal Indian Navy | The minesweeper/naval trawler capsized and sank in the Hooghli River when struck by a 30-foot (9.1 m) wave during a cyclone while at anchor at Diamond Harbour off Haldi River Buoy. |
| Polaris | Norway | World War II: The seal catcher caught fire and sank in the Hudson Strait and was abandoned by her 16 crew. She may have struck a mine. |
| Teti | Greece | The cargo ship ran aground and was wrecked off Volos. |
| Trafalgar | Norway | World War II: The cargo ship was torpedoed and sunk in the Caribbean Sea 1,100 nautical miles (2,000 km) north west of Guadeloupe (25°30′N 52°00′W) by U-129 (Kriegsmarine). Her 43 crew survived. |
| U-353 | Kriegsmarine | World War II: The Type VIIC submarine was depth charged, rammed and sunk in the Atlantic Ocean (53°54′N 29°30′W) by HMS Fame (Royal Navy) with the loss of six of her 45 crew. Survivors were rescued by HNoMS Andenes (Royal Norwegian Navy) and HMS Fame. |

== 17 October ==
List of shipwrecks: 17 October 1942
| Ship | State | Description |
|---|---|---|
| Empire Chaucer | United Kingdom | World War II: The cargo ship was torpedoed and sunk in the South Atlantic 450 nautical miles (830 km) south of Cape Town, Union of South Africa by U-504 (Kriegsmarine) with the loss off three of the 50 people on board. Survivors were rescued by Empire Squire and Nebraska (both United Kingdom). |
| Holland Maru | Japan | World War II: The cargo ship was torpedoed and sunk in the Bungo Channel (21°21′N 132°04′E) by USS Trigger (United States Navy). |
| Holtenau | Germany | World War II: The transport ship struck a mine and sank in the English Channel north east of Calais, France. |
| Oboro | Imperial Japanese Navy | World War II: The Fubuki-class destroyer was bombed and sunk in the Bering Sea either 30 nautical miles (56 km; 35 mi) northeast of Kiska Island in the Aleutian Islands, Territory of Alaska (52°17′N 178°08′E), or 10 nautical miles (19 km) north of Pillar Rock (52°07′20″N 177°22′00″E) off Kiska Island (sources disagree) in an attack by six Martin B-26 Marauder aircraft of the Eleventh Air Force, United States Army Air Forces. Her commanding officer and 16 of her crew were rescued by Hatsuharu (Imperial Japanese Navy); the rest of her probable complement of 219 men were killed. |

== 18 October ==
List of shipwrecks: 18 October 1942
| Ship | State | Description |
|---|---|---|
| Angelina | United States | World War II: Convoy ON 137: The cargo ship straggled behind the convoy. She was torpedoed and sunk in the Atlantic Ocean (49°39′N 30°20′W) by U-618 (Kriegsmarine) with 13 gunners and 33 of her crew drowning in exceptionally high seas. Survivors, four gunners and four of her crew, were rescued by Bury (United Kingdom). |
| Hakonesan Maru | Imperial Japanese Navy | World War II: The Hakubasan Maru-class auxiliary transport was torpedoed and sunk in the Pacific Ocean 15 miles (24 km) east of Horamachi-shi, Fukushima Prefecture (37°35′N 141°30′E) by USS Greenling (United States Navy). 14 of her crew were killed. |
| Libau | Germany | World War II: The cargo ship was torpedoed and damaged off Vilnesfjord, Norway by Uredd (Royal Norwegian Navy). She was beached, but was declared a constructive total loss. |
| Panuco | Italy | World War II: The tanker was torpedoed and damaged in the Mediterranean Sea by HMS Una (Royal Navy). She was abandoned by her crew. Panuco was later towed to Taranto. She was subsequently repaired and returned to service. |

== 19 October ==
For the loss of USS O'Brien on this day, see the entry for 15 September 1942.

List of shipwrecks: 19 October 1942
| Ship | State | Description |
|---|---|---|
| Beppe | Italy | World War II: The cargo ship was torpedoed and sunk in the Mediterranean Sea (35°45′N 12°01′E) by HMS Unbending (Royal Navy). |
| Giovanni da Verrazzano | Regia Marina | World War II: The Navigatori-class destroyer was torpedoed and sunk in the Mediterranean Sea north west of Lampedusa (35°52′N 12°02′E) by HMS Unbending (Royal Navy). There were 20 killed and 255 survivors. |
| Nordland | Norway | World War II: The cargo ship was torpedoed and sunk in Saltfjorden (67°12′N 12°57′E) by Junon (Free French Naval Forces) with the loss of 17 of the 22 people on board. |
| Roma | Regia Marina | World War II: The auxiliary minesweeper, a former tug, was shelled and sunk off Stampalia, Greece (36°43′N 26°41′E) by HMS Thrasher (Royal Navy). There were no survivors from her 30-plus crew. |
| Rothley | United Kingdom | World War II: The cargo ship was torpedoed and sunk in the Atlantic Ocean 300 nautical miles (560 km) east of Barbados (13°34′N 54°34′W) by U-332 (Kriegsmarine) with the loss of two of her 40 crew. |
| Steel Navigator | United States | World War II: Convoy ON 137: The cargo ship straggled behind the convoy. She was torpedoed and sunk in the Atlantic Ocean (49°45′N 31°20′W) by U-610 (Kriegsmarine) with the loss of 36 of her 52 crew. Survivors, six gunners and ten of her crew, were rescued by HMS Decoy (Royal Navy) on 27 October. 17 survivors on another life raft were lost. |
| Titania | Italy | World War II: The cargo ship was torpedoed and damaged in the Mediterranean Sea by Allied aircraft, or by HMS Unbroken (Royal Navy). She was taken in tow by Ascari (Regia Marina), but was torpedoed and sunk the next day (34°45′N 12°31′E) by HMS Safari (Royal Navy). There were 78 survivors. |

== 20 October ==
List of shipwrecks: 20 October 1942
| Ship | State | Description |
|---|---|---|
| Africa Maru | Imperial Japanese Army | World War II: The Hawaii Maru-class transport ship was torpedoed just before midnight in the South China Sea west of Formosa, China (24°26′N 120°25′E) by USS Finback (United States Navy) sinking just after midnight on 21 October. Three of her crew were killed. |
| Lero | Italy | World War II: The cargo ship was torpedoed and sunk in the Aegean Sea by HMS Thrasher (Royal Navy) with the loss of four lives. |
| Mahrous | Syria | World War II: The sailing ship was shelled and sunk in the Mediterranean Sea 30 nautical miles (56 km) north west of Saida, Lebanon by U-77 (Kriegsmarine). Her crew survived. |
| Nanshin Maru | Imperial Japanese Navy | World War II: The guard ship was shelled and sunk in the Pacific Ocean by USS Tautog (United States Navy). |
| Ryunan Maru | Japan | World War II: The cargo ship was torpedoed and sunk in the Pacific Ocean off the eastern coast of Kyūshū (34°08′N 136°46′E) by USS Drum (United States Navy). |
| Scalaria | United Kingdom | World War II: The tanker was bombed, torpedoed and sunk in the Red Sea off Ras Gharib, Egypt by Heinkel He 111 aircraft of the Luftwaffe with the loss of 11 of her 48 crew. |
| Yamafuji Maru | Japan | World War II: The cargo ship was torpedoed and sunk in the South China Sea west of Formosa (24°26′N 120°25′E) by USS Finback (United States Navy). |
| U-216 | Kriegsmarine | World War II: The Type VIID submarine was depth charged and sunk in the Atlantic Ocean south west of Ireland (48°21′N 19°25′W) by a Consolidated B-24 Liberator aircraft of 224 Squadron, Royal Air Force with the loss of all 45 crew. |

== 21 October ==
List of shipwrecks: 21 October 1942
| Ship | State | Description |
|---|---|---|
| Le Progrès | Germany | World War II: The coastal tanker was torpedoed and damaged in the Black Sea by M-35 (Soviet Navy). She was consequently scuttled by Kriegsmarine R-boats. |
| Nichiho Maru | Japan | World War II: The cargo ship was torpedoed and sunk in the East China Sea, north of Formosa, China (27°03′N 122°42′E) by USS Guardfish (United States Navy). |
| Palatia | Kriegsmarine | World War II: The prisoner transport ship was sunk off Lindesnes, Norway (57°58.1′N 07°14′E) by a Handley Page Hampden aircraft of 489 Squadron, Royal New Zealand Air Force, with the loss of 986 of the 1,034 people on board. |
| S 7 | Soviet Navy | World War II: The S-class submarine was torpedoed and sunk in the Baltic Sea (59°51′N 19°32′E) by Vesihiisi (Finnish Navy) with the loss of 44 of her 48 crew. Survivors were taken as prisoners of war. |
| Tyoko Maru | Imperial Japanese Army | World War II: The Eastern Shore-class auxiliary transport ship was torpedoed and sunk in the Pacific Ocean 110 nautical miles (200 km) west north west of Rabaul, Papua New Guinea (3°30′S 150°30′E) by USS Gudgeon (United States Navy). Five crew were killed. |

== 22 October ==
List of shipwrecks: 22 October 1942
| Ship | State | Description |
|---|---|---|
| Azov | Soviet Union | World War II: The cargo ship was sunk at Tuapse by Luftwaffe aircraft. One crew was killed. |
| Donax | United Kingdom | World War II: Convoy ON 139: The tanker (8,036 GRT) was torpedoed and damaged in the Atlantic Ocean (49°51′N 27°58′W) by U-443 (Kriegsmarine). Donax was taken in tow by HMS Marauder and HMS Nimble (both Royal Navy) but foundered on 29 October at 48°04′N 24°41′W. Her 63 crew were all rescued by HMCS Drumheller (Royal Canadian Navy), HMS Nimble and a Royal Navy destroyer. |
| Hakkaisan Maru | Imperial Japanese Navy | World War II: The Kinsen Maru-class auxiliary gunboat was shelled and sunk in the Pacific Ocean about 80 nautical miles (150 km) south west of Rotcher Island, Gilbert Islands (03°00′N 175°15′E) by USS Lamson and USS Mahan (both United States Navy). She was lost with all hands. |
| HMS LCM 89 | Royal Navy | The Landing Craft, Mechanized was lost on this date. |
| Ocean Vintage | United Kingdom | World War II: The Ocean ship (7,174 GRT) was torpedoed and sunk in the Indian Ocean (21°37′N 60°06′E) by I-27 (Imperial Japanese Navy). Her whole complement, 44 crew and 6 gunners all survived. A Royal Air Force crash boat towed their lifeboats to Ras al Hadd Harbor. |
| Remmaren | Sweden | World War II: The cargo ship (3,775 GRT) struck a mine and sank off the coast of Norway (58°29′N 3°50′E). Her 47 crew were rescued. |
| Ronaldsay | United Kingdom | World War II: The dredger was torpedoed and sunk at Safaga, Egypt by Luftwaffe aircraft. |
| SF-12 | Luftwaffe | World War II: Battle of Sukho Island: The Siebel ferry ran aground and was shelled and sunk, or scuttled, in shallow water, only partially submerged, by Soviet shore batteries at Sukho Island in Lake Ladoga. |
| SF-13 | Luftwaffe | World War II: Battle of Sukho Island: The Siebel ferry ran aground and was shelled and sunk, or scuttled, in shallow water, only partially submerged, by Soviet shore batteries at Sukho Island in Lake Ladoga. |
| SF-21 | Luftwaffe | World War II: Battle of Sukho Island: The Siebel ferry was shelled and sunk by Soviet shore batteries at Sukho Island in Lake Ladoga. |
| SF-22 | Luftwaffe | World War II: Battle of Sukho Island: The Siebel ferry was shelled and damaged by Soviet shore batteries at Sukho Island in Lake Ladoga and ran aground, or was partially scuttled in shallow water. She was later shelled and sunk by Nora (Soviet Navy) |
| SF-26 | Luftwaffe | World War II: Battle of Sukho Island: The Siebel ferry ran aground and was shelled and sunk in shallow water, only partially submerged, by Soviet shore batteries at Sukho Island in Lake Ladoga. Later salvaged and put into Soviet Navy service as DB-51. |
| U-412 | Kriegsmarine | World War II: The Type VIIC submarine was depth charged and sunk in the Atlantic Ocean north east of the Faroe Islands (63°55′N 0°24′E) by a Vickers Wellington aircraft of 179 Squadron, Royal Air Force. |
| Winnipeg II | United Kingdom | World War II: Convoy ON 139: The passenger ship (9,807 GRT) was torpedoed and sunk in the Atlantic Ocean (49°51′N 27°58′W) by U-443 (Kriegsmarine). All 192 people on board were rescued by HMCS Morden (Royal Canadian Navy). |

== 23 October ==
List of shipwrecks: 23 October 1942
| Ship | State | Description |
|---|---|---|
| Arco Azurro | Regia Marina | World War II: The Luranna-class minesweeper was sunk at Genoa by Allied aircraft. |
| City of Johannesburg | United Kingdom | World War II: The cargo ship was torpedoed and sunk in the Indian Ocean south east of East London, Union of South Africa (33°20′S 29°30′E) by U-504 (Kriegsmarine) with the loss of two of her 89 crew. Survivors were rescued by Fort George, King Edward (both United Kingdom) and Zypenburg (Netherlands). |
| Empire Star | United Kingdom | World War II: The cargo ship was torpedoed and sunk in the Atlantic Ocean (48°14′N 26°22′W) by U-615 (Kriegsmarine) with the loss of 42 of the 103 people on board. Survivors were rescued by HMS Black Swan (Royal Navy). |
| Empire Turnstone | United Kingdom | World War II: Convoy ONS 136: The cargo ship straggled behind the convoy. She was torpedoed and sunk in the Atlantic Ocean (54°40′N 28°00′W) by U-621 (Kriegsmarine) with the loss of all 46 crew. |
| HMS Phoebe | Royal Navy | World War II: The Dido-class cruiser was torpedoed and damaged in the Atlantic Ocean 6 nautical miles (11 km) west of Pointe Noire, French Equatorial Africa by U-161 (Kriegsmarine) with the loss of 42 of her crew. She was beached at Pointe Noire. Later salvaged, she was repaired and returned to service in August 1943. |
| Pronta | Italy | World War II: The salvage tug was torpedoed and sunk at Khoms, Libya by HMS Umbra (Royal Navy) while working on the beached Amsterdam (Italy). |
| Reuben Tipton | United States | World War II: The Type C2-S-AJ1 cargo ship was torpedoed and sunk in the Atlantic Ocean 400 nautical miles (740 km) north east of Trinidad (14°33′N 54°51′W) by U-129 (Kriegsmarine) with the loss of three of her crew. Her master and a crew member were rescued by a Martin PBM Mariner aircraft of the United States Navy on 25 October, and a motor torpedo boat of the Royal Navy rescued 39 crewmen and 10 gunners on 26 October. |
| Seikyo Maru | Imperial Japanese Navy | World War II: The Sinkyo Maru-class transport ship was sunk by torpedo in the Pacific Ocean off the coast of Japan (33°12′N 135°14′E) by USS Kingfish (United States Navy) with the loss of 43 lives. |
| Sperrbrecher 11 Belgrano | Kriegsmarine | World War II: The Sperrbrecher struck a mine and broke in two in the North Sea off Ameland, Friesland, Netherlands. Her stern section was towed to Hamburg. She was repaired and returned to service post-war. |
| No. 104 | Soviet Navy | The G-5-class motor torpedo boat was lost on this date. |

== 24 October ==
For the foundering of the Norwegian cargo ship SS Vestland on this day, see the entry for 15 January 1942.

List of shipwrecks: 24 October 1942
| Ship | State | Description |
|---|---|---|
| Batavier III | Netherlands | World War II: The cargo liner was sunk by a mine off Ålborg, Denmark. Her 47 crew, including five slightly wounded, were rescued. |
| Holmpark | United Kingdom | World War II: The cargo ship was torpedoed and sunk in the Atlantic Ocean 900 nautical miles (1,700 km) east of Barbados (13°11′N 47°00′W) by U-516 (Kriegsmarine) with the loss of one of her 50 crew. A lifeboat with survivors reached Saint Lucia on 9 November. Holmpark was on a voyage from Lourenço Marques, Mozambique to Trinidad. |
| Jon Olafsson | Iceland | World War II: The fishing trawler was torpedoed and sunk in the Atlantic Ocean by U-383 (Kriegsmarine) with the loss of all 13 crew. |
| Kenun Maru | Japan | World War II: The cargo ship was torpedoed and sunk off the coast of Japan (24°00′N 141°50′E by USS Nautilus (United States Navy). Her crew survived. |
| Molot | Soviet Union | The cargo ship was lost with all hands in the Caspian Sea between Baku and Krasnovodsk from unknown causes. |
| RF-02 | Kriegsmarine | World War II: The patrol craft was bombed and sunk in the Black Sea by Ilyushin Il-4 aircraft of the Soviet Naval Air Force. |
| U-599 | Kriegsmarine | World War II: The Type VIIC submarine was depth charged and sunk in the Atlantic Ocean north east of the Azores, Portugal (46°07′N 17°40′W) by a Consolidated B-24 Liberator of 224 Squadron, Royal Air Force with the loss of all 44 crew. |

== 25 October ==
List of shipwrecks: 25 October 1942
| Ship | State | Description |
|---|---|---|
| Kotobuki Maru No. 5 | Imperial Japanese Navy | World War II: The netlayer (720 GRT) was bombed and sunk northwest of Rabaul, New Britain, on north shore near Korere Bay by Boeing B-17 Flying Fortress aircraft of the United States Army Air Force. |
| Primero | Norway | World War II: The cargo ship (4,414 GRT) was torpedoed and sunk in the Atlantic Ocean (13°38′N 53°55′W) by U-67 (Kriegsmarine) with the loss of two of her 33 crew. |
| USS Seminole | United States Navy | World War II: The Navajo-class fleet tug (1,500 GRT) was shelled and sunk off Tulagi, Solomon Islands by Akatsuki, Ikazuchi and Shiratsuyu (all Imperial Japanese Navy) with the loss of one of her 80 crew. |
| Shinyu Maru | Imperial Japanese Army | World War II: The transport ship was torpedoed by HNLMS O 23 (Koninklijk Marine) in the Straits of Malacca. |
| Valencia | Sweden | World War II: The ore carrier (1,514 GRT) struck a ]mine and sank in the Kattegat north of Sjællands Odde, Denmark (56°11′01″N 12°16′06″E). Her crew survived. |
| USS YP-284 | United States Navy | World War II: The district patrol craft (469 GRT) was shelled and sunk off Tulagi, Solomon Islands by Akatsuki, Ikazuchi and Shiratsuyu (all Imperial Japanese Navy). Two passengers were killed, other passengers and the whole crew survived. |
| Yura | Imperial Japanese Navy | World War II: The Nagara-class cruiser (5,690 GRT) was bombed, torpedoed and damaged in the Indispensable Strait off Guadalcanal, Solomon Islands by Bell P-39 Airacobra, Boeing B-17 Flying Fortress and Douglas SBD Dauntless aircraft of the United States Army Air Force, United States Marine Corps and United States Navy. Her crew lost 135 killed and wounded, including at least four officers killed. She broke in two, with the bow section sinking; the stern section was scuttled by Harusame and Yūdachi (both Imperial Japanese Navy) at 8°15′S 159°07′E. |

== 26 October ==
List of shipwrecks: 26 October 1942
| Ship | State | Description |
|---|---|---|
| Amerika | Soviet Union | World War II: The barge was sunk in the Port of Astrakhan by Luftwaffe aircraft. A crew member was killed. Eight survivors were rescued by M-14 (Soviet Navy). |
| Anglo Mærsk | United Kingdom | World War II: Convoy SL 125: The tanker straggled behind the convoy. She was torpedoed and damaged in the Atlantic Ocean south west of the Canary Islands, Spain (27°50′N 22°15′W) by U-509 (Kriegsmarine). She was torpedoed and sunk the next day at 27°15′N 17°55′W by U-604 (Kriegsmarine). Her 35 crew survived. |
| Anne Hutchinson | United States | World War II: The Liberty ship was torpedoed and damaged in the Indian Ocean 60 nautical miles (110 km) east of East London, Union of South Africa (33°10′S 28°30′E) by U-504 (Kriegsmarine) with the loss of three of her 57 crew. Survivors were rescued by Steel Mariner (United States) and a South African fishing vessel. An attempt was made to tow Anne Hutchinson by HMSAS David Haigh (South African Navy). She was later split in two by explosive charges, with the stern section sinking. The bow section was towed to Port Elizabeth by HMSAS David Haigh, where the ship was declared a total loss. |
| Arca | Italy | World War II: The tanker was torpedoed and sunk in the Aegean Sea 9 nautical miles (17 km) south of Chios, Greece by HMS Taku (Royal Navy). Her 25 crew survived the sinking. |
| Betty H. | Finland | World War II: Continuation War: The cargo ship was torpedoed and sunk south of Mariehamn, Åland 59°54′N 19°45′E) by ShCh-307 (Soviet Navy). |
| USS Hornet | United States Navy | USS Hornet World War II: Battle of the Santa Cruz Islands: The Yorktown-class aircraft carrier was severely damaged by Japanese aircraft with the loss of 140 of her 2,919 crew. She was abandoned at 01:35 on 27 October and was subsequently sunk by Makigumo and Akigumo (both (Imperial Japanese Navy) 08°38′S 166°43′E). The wreck was discovered in January 2019. |
| Keizan Maru | Japan | World War II: The transport ship was torpedoed and sunk off the Kuril Islands by USS S-31 (United States Navy). Eight crew were killed. |
| Mercator | Finland | World War II: The lugger was sunk at Brüsterort, Germany by Shch-406 (Soviet Navy). |
| USS Porter | United States Navy | World War II: Battle of the Santa Cruz Islands: The Porter-class destroyer was torpedoed and damaged in the Pacific Ocean north east of Guadalcanal, Solomon Islands by a torpedo from a crashed Grumman TBF Avenger aircraft United States Navy. She was subsequently scuttled by USS Shaw (United States Navy) due to damage received. 15 of her crew were killed or died of their wounds. |
| President Coolidge | United States Army | President Coolidge World War II: The troopship struck a mine in the Pacific Ocean off Espiritu Santo, Solomon Islands and sank. Of the 5,342 people on board, two lost their lives. |
| Teifu Maru | Japan | The cargo ship was run ashore off the coast of Fukien Province, China (23°33′N 117°21′E). The vessel was pulled off on 28 October and sailed to Hong Kong for repairs. |
| Tergestea | Italy | World War II: The cargo ship was torpedoed and sunk in the Mediterranean Sea off the coast of Libya by British aircraft. All 80 men aboard were killed. |
| UJ 1204 Böhmen | Kriegsmarine | World War II: The submarine hunter struck a mine and sank in the Gulf of Finland with the loss of 45 of her crew. |
| Udarnik | Soviet Union | World War II: The tug was sunk in the Port of Astrakhan by Luftwaffe aircraft with the loss of 13 of her passengers and crew. |

== 27 October ==
List of shipwrecks: 27 October 1942
| Ship | State | Description |
|---|---|---|
| Gurney E. Newlin | United States | World War II: Convoy HX 212: The cargo ship straggled behind the convoy. She was torpedoed and damaged in the Atlantic Ocean (54°51′N 30°06′W) by U-436 (Kriegsmarine) with the loss of three of her 59 crew. Survivors abandoned ship and were rescued by Bic Island ( Canada) and HMCS Alberni (Royal Canadian Navy). Gurney E. Newlin was torpedoed and sunk the next day by U-606 (Kriegsmarine). |
| Hokuango Maru | Japan | World War II: The cargo liner was torpedoed and sunk in the South China Sea off the coast of French Indochina by USS Tautog (United States Navy). |
| Lora | Greece | World War II: The auxiliary sailing vessel was shelled and sunk in the Aegean Sea by HMS Taku (Royal Navy). |
| Malgache | Germany | World War II: The cargo ship was torpedoed and damaged in the Baltic Sea 20 nautical miles (37 km) north of Liepāja, Latvia (56°52′N 20°59′E) by S-12 (Soviet Navy) and was beached. She was later salvaged. |
| Pacific Star | United Kingdom | World War II: Convoy SL 125: The refrigerated cargo ship was torpedoed and damaged in the Atlantic Ocean (29°15′N 20°57′W) by U-509 (Kriegsmarine). She was abandoned the next day at 29°21′N 19°28′W but did not sink until 30 October. Her 96 crew survived. |
| Shch-308 | Soviet Navy | World War II: The Shchuka-class submarine was lost in the Baltic Sea. Possibly sunk in the Sodra-Kvarken Channel. The attacker was Iku-Turso (Finnish Navy). |
| Sourabaya | United Kingdom | World War II: Convoy HX 212: The whale factory ship was torpedoed and sunk in the Atlantic Ocean (54°32′N 31°02′W) by U-436 (Kriegsmarine) with the loss of 77 of the 154 people on board. Survivors were rescued by Bic Island ( Canada), HMCS Alberni and HMCS Ville de Quebec (both Royal Canadian Navy). A landing craft carried as deck cargo was also lost.^{[note 3]} |
| Stentor | United Kingdom | World War II: Convoy SL 125: The cargo liner was torpedoed and sunk in the Atlantic Ocean (29°13′N 20°53′W) by U-509 (Kriegsmarine) with the loss of 44 of the 246 people on board. Survivors were rescued by HMS Woodruff (Royal Navy). |
| U-627 | Kriegsmarine | World War II: The Type VIIC submarine was depth charged and sunk in the Atlantic Ocean south of Iceland (59°14′N 22°49′W) by a Boeing B-17 Flying Fortress aircraft of 206 Squadron, Royal Air Force with the loss of all 44 crew. |

== 28 October ==
List of shipwrecks: 28 October 1942
| Ship | State | Description |
|---|---|---|
| Bengt Sture | Sweden | World War II: The ore carrier was torpedoed and sunk in the Baltic Sea by Shch-406 (Soviet Navy). Four survivors were rescued by Shch-406 and sent to Leningrad but were never heard of again. A source gives a total of 14 men and a woman killed, but it may include the above survivors. |
| Butia | Brazil | The cargo ship ran aground and was wrecked off Piauí. |
| Hopecastle | United Kingdom | World War II: Convoy SL 125: The cargo ship straggled behind the convoy. She was torpedoed and damaged in the Atlantic Ocean north west of the Canary Islands, Spain (31°39′N 19°23′W) by U-509 (Kriegsmarine). She was torpedoed, shelled and sunk the next day at 31°30′N 19°35′W by U-203 (Kriegsmarine) with the loss of five of her 45 crew. Survivors were rescued by Mano (United Kingdom) or reached land in their lifeboat. |
| Kosmos II | Norway | World War II: Convoy HX 212: The factory ship was torpedoed and damaged in the Atlantic Ocean (55°15′N 28°10′W) by U-606 (Kriegsmarine). She was then torpedoed and sunk by U-624 (Kriegsmarine) with the loss of 33 of the 133 people on board on 29 October. Survivors were rescued by Barrwhin (United Kingdom) and HMCS Kenogami (Royal Canadian Navy). Three landing craft carried as deck cargo were also lost.^{[note 4]} |
| Luisiano | Italy | World War II: The cargo ship was torpedoed and sunk in the Mediterranean Sea off the coast of Libya by British aircraft. There were 25 dead and eight survivors. |
| Nagpore | United Kingdom | World War II: Convoy SL 125: The cargo ship was torpedoed and sunk in the Atlantic Ocean northwest of the Canary Islands (31°30′N 19°35′W) by U-509 (Kriegsmarine) with the loss of 20 of her 73 crew. Survivors were rescued by HMS Crocus (Royal Navy) or reached land in their lifeboats. |

== 29 October ==
List of shipwrecks: 29 October 1942
| Ship | State | Description |
|---|---|---|
| Abosso | United Kingdom | World War II: The unescorted passenger ship was torpedoed and sunk in the Atlantic Ocean 700 nautical miles (1,300 km) northwest of the Azores, Portugal (48°30′N 28°50′W) by U-575 (Kriegsmarine) with the loss of 362 of the 393 people on board. She was on a voyage from Cape Town, Union of South Africa to Liverpool, Lancashire. Survivors were rescued by HMS Bideford (Royal Navy). |
| No. 21 | Soviet Union | World War II: The barge was sunk in the Volgo-Caspian Channel by Luftwaffe aircraft. Five of her passenger and crew killed. Nine passengers and crew were rescued by Bakinets (Soviet Union). |
| Barrwhin | United Kingdom | World War II: Convoy HX 212: The cargo ship was torpedoed and sunk in the Atlantic Ocean (55°02′N 22°45′W) by U-436 with the loss of 24 of the 114 people on board. Survivors were rescued by HMCS Kenogami (Royal Canadian Navy). |
| Bic Island | Canada | World War II: Convoy HX 212: The cargo ship straggled behind the convoy due to rescuing survivors from the sinking of Gurney E. Newlin (United States) and Sourabaya (United Kingdom). She was torpedoed and sunk in the Atlantic Ocean (55°05′N 23°27′W) by U-224 (Kriegsmarine) with the loss of all 165 people on board. |
| Corinaldo | United Kingdom | World War II: Convoy SL 125: The refrigerated cargo ship straggled behind the convoy. She was torpedoed and damaged in the Atlantic Ocean (33°20′N 18°12′W by U-503, with the loss of eight of her 58 crew. She was abandoned by the survivors, who were rescued by HMS Cowslip (Royal Navy). Corinaldo was torpedoed, shelled and sunk the next day by U-203 (Kriegsmarine). |
| I-172 | Imperial Japanese Navy | World War II: The Kaidai-class submarine was sunk west of San Cristobal by an American Consolidated PBY Catalina aircraft. |
| Laplace | United Kingdom | World War II: The cargo ship was torpedoed and sunk in the South Atlantic south east of Cape Agulhas, Union of South Africa (40°35′S 21°35′E) by U-159 (Kriegsmarine). All 63 people on board were rescued by George Gale (United States), Porto Alegre ( Brazil) or a South African Air Force rescue boat. |
| Macabi | Panama | World War II: The cargo ship struck a mine and sank off Port of Spain, Trinidad (10°01′30″N 60°54′30″W). |
| Pan-New York | United States | World War II: Convoy HX 212: The tanker was torpedoed and damaged in the Atlantic Ocean (54°58′N 23°56′W) by U-624 (Kriegsmarine) with the loss of 43 of her 57 crew. Survivors were rescued by HMCS Rosthern and HMCS Summerside (both Royal Canadian Navy), which scuttled the ship. |
| Primrose Hill | United Kingdom | World War II: Convoy ON 139: The cargo ship was torpedoed and sunk in the Atlantic Ocean (18°58′N 28°40′W) by UD-5 (Kriegsmarine) with the loss of three of her 49 crew. Survivors were rescued by Sansu (United Kingdom). |
| Ross | United Kingdom | World War II: The cargo ship was torpedoed and sunk in the South Atlantic 370 nautical miles (690 km) south east of Cape Agulhas (38°51′S 21°40′E) by U-159 (Kriegsmarine) with the loss of one of her 40 crew. Survivors were rescued by HMS Rockrose (Royal Navy). |

== 30 October ==
List of shipwrecks: 30 October 1942
| Ship | State | Description |
|---|---|---|
| Baron Vernon | United Kingdom | World War II: Convoy SL 125: The cargo ship was torpedoed and sunk in the Atlantic Ocean north of Madeira, Portugal (36°06′N 16°59′W) by U-604 (Kriegsmarine). All 49 crew were rescued by Baron Elgin (United Kingdom). |
| Brittany | United Kingdom | World War II: Convoy SL 125: The refrigerated cargo ship was torpedoed and sunk in the Atlantic Ocean off Madeira (33°29′N 18°32′W) by U-509 (Kriegsmarine) with the loss of 14 of the 57 people on board. Survivors were rescued by HMS Kelantan (Royal Navy). |
| Bullmouth | United Kingdom | World War II: Convoy SL 125: The tanker was torpedoed and damaged in the Atlantic Ocean by U-409 (Kriegsmarine). She consequently straggled behind the convoy and was torpedoed and sunk at 33°20′N 18°25′W by U-659 (Kriegsmarine) with the loss of 50 of her 56 crew. |
| Komintern | Soviet Union | World War II: The tanker was sunk in the Port of Astrakhan by Luftwaffe aircraft. Three of her crew were killed. |
| Président Doumer | United Kingdom | World War II: Convoy SL 125: The troopship was torpedoed and sunk in the Atlantic Ocean north east of Madeira (35°08′N 16°44′W) by U-604 (Kriegsmarine) with the loss of 260 of the 345 people on board. Survivors were rescued by Alaska (Norway) and HMS Cowslip (Royal Navy). |
| Silverwillow | United Kingdom | World War II: Convoy SL 125: The cargo ship was torpedoed and damaged in the Atlantic Ocean (35°08′N 16°44′W) by U-408 (Kriegsmarine) with the loss of six of the 67 people on board. She was abandoned on 5 November at 34°07′N 14°39′W. Survivors were rescued by HMS Kelantan (Royal Navy). Silverwillow foundered on 6 November at 37°24′N 10°45′W. |
| Tasmania | United Kingdom | World War II: Convoy SL 125: The cargo ship was torpedoed and damaged in the Atlantic Ocean by U-659 (Kriegsmarine). She was torpedoed and sunk the next day (36°06′N 16°59′W) by U-103 (Kriegsmarine) with the loss of two of the 90 people on board. Survivors were rescued by Alaska (Norway) and Baron Elgin (United Kingdom). |
| U-520 | Kriegsmarine | World War II: The Type IXC submarine was depth charged and sunk in the Atlantic Ocean (47°47′N 49°50′W) by a Douglas Digby aircraft of 10 Squadron, Royal Canadian Air Force with the loss of all 53 crew. |
| U-559 | Kriegsmarine | World War II: The Type VIIC submarine was depth charged and sunk in the Mediterranean Sea (32°30′N 33°00′E) by Dulverton, HMS Hero, HMS Hurworth, HMS Pakenham and HMS Petard (all Royal Navy) with the loss of seven of her 45 crew. |
| U-658 | Kriegsmarine | World War II: The Type VIIC submarine was depth charged and sunk in the Atlantic Ocean (50°32′N 46°32′W) by a Lockheed Hudson aircraft of 145 Squadron, Royal Canadian Air Force with the loss of all 48 crew. |
| West Kebar | United States | World War II: The cargo ship was torpedoed and sunk in the Atlantic Ocean 350 nautical miles (650 km) north east of Barbados (14°57′N 53°37′W) by U-129 (Kriegsmarine) with the loss of three of her 57 crew. 34 survivors were rescued by a Royal Navy patrol boat on 8 November; eight survivors reached Guadalupe in their lifeboats on 10 November, and nine were rescued by Campero (Spain) on 18 November. |
| No. 34 | Soviet Navy | The Project 1125 armored motor gunboat was lost on this date. |

== 31 October ==
List of shipwrecks: 31 October 1942
| Ship | State | Description |
|---|---|---|
| Aldington Court | United Kingdom | World War II: The cargo ship was torpedoed and sunk in the South Atlantic west of Port Nolloth, Union of South Africa (30°20′S 2°10′W) by U-172 (Kriegsmarine) with the loss of 33 of her 44 crew. One crew member was taken on board U-172 as a prisoner of war, the rest of them were rescued by City of Christiana (United Kingdom). |
| Empire Guidon | United Kingdom | World War II: The cargo ship was torpedoed and sunk in the Indian Ocean 180 nautical miles (330 km) east south east of Durban, Union of South Africa (30°48′S 34°11′E) by U-504 (Kriegsmarine) with the loss of five of the 57 people on board. Survivors were rescued by Clan Alpine (United Kingdom). |
| HMS MTB 87 | Royal Navy | World War II: The Vosper 72 foot-class motor torpedo boat was sunk by a mine in the North Sea. |
| Marylyn | United Kingdom | World War II: The cargo ship was torpedoed and sunk in the South Atlantic (0°46′S 32°42′W) by U-174 (Kriegsmarine) with the loss of 15 of her 42 crew. Survivors were rescued by Ettrickbank and Pundit (both United Kingdom). |
| Reynolds | United Kingdom | World War II: The cargo ship was torpedoed and sunk in the Indian Ocean 210 nautical miles (390 km) east of Durban (30°02′S 35°02′E) by U-504 (Kriegsmarine) with the loss of all 47 crew. |
| USS YP-345 | United States Navy | The yard patrol boat/naval trawler disappeared without trace with her seventeen crew. She was on a voyage from Pearl Harbor to Midway Island via the French Frigate Shoals. Cause is unknown. |
| No. 045 | Soviet Navy | The MO-4-class motor anti-submarine boat was lost on this date. |

== Unknown date ==
List of shipwrecks: Unknown date 1942
| Ship | State | Description |
|---|---|---|
| HMS LCM 31 | Royal Navy | The Landing Craft, Mechanized was lost sometime in October. |
| Nojima Maru | Imperial Japanese Navy | World War II: The Nagara Maru-class transport ship was damaged in a series of air attacks between mid-September and early October 1942, being beached sometime between 1 and 9 October in Trout Lagoon, Kiska, Alaska Territory. Her crew abandoned her on 13 October. She was bombed and burned out on 20 April 1943. The stern of the ship sank under tow to be scrapped in Japan in early 1956, while the bow remained beached. |
| Shch-213 | Soviet Navy | World War II: The Shchuka-class submarine struck a mine and sank off Constanţa, Romania with the loss of all hands sometime in October. Originally thought to have been sunk on 14 October by a Kriegsmarine submarine chaser. |
| Shch-320 | Soviet Navy | World War II: The Shchuka-class submarine struck a mine and sank in the Gulf of Finland between 3 and 10 October 1942. Her 37 crew were all lost. The wreck was found in the area of Bolshoy Tyuters Island on 1 May 2017. |
| U-116 | Kriegsmarine | World War II: The Type XB submarine disappeared without trace after a last radio report on 6 October 1942 from 45°00′N 31°30′W. Lost with all 58 crew. |
| HMS Unique | Royal Navy | World War II: The U-class submarine was lost between 9 and 24 October between Land's End, Cornwall and Gibraltar with the loss of all 34 crew. |
| No. 16 | Soviet Navy | The G-5-class motor torpedo boat was lost during the month. |

== Notes ==
1. ^Note 1 Task Force 64 comprised USS Boise, USS Buchanan, USS Duncan, USS Farenholt, USS Helena, USS Laffey, USS McCalla, USS San Francisco and USS Salt Lake City.
2. ^Note 2 The vessels lost with Southern Empress were: LCT 2006, and LCMs 508, 509, 519, 522, 523, 532, 537, 547, 620.
3. ^Note 3 The vessel lost with Sourabaya was LCT 2281.
4. ^Note 4 The vessels lost with Kosmos II were LCTs 2190, 2192 and 2284.
