= German submarine U-615 =

German World War II submarine

History

Nazi Germany
- Name: U-615
- Ordered: 15 August 1940
- Builder: Blohm & Voss, Hamburg
- Yard number: 591
- Laid down: 20 May 1941
- Launched: 8 February 1942
- Commissioned: 26 March 1942
- Fate: Sunk in the Caribbean Sea on 7 August 1943

General characteristics
- Class & type: Type VIIC submarine
- Displacement: 769 t (757 long tons); 871 t (857 long tons) submerged; 1,070 t (1,053 long tons) total
- Length: 67.10 m (220 ft 2 in) total; 50.50 m (165 ft 8 in) pressure hull
- Beam: 6.20 m (20 ft 4 in) total; 4.70 m (15 ft 5 in) pressure hull
- Draught: 4.74 m (15 ft 7 in)
- Propulsion: Diesel-electric; 3,200 PS (2,354 kW; 3,156 shp) surfaced; 750 PS (552 kW; 740 shp) submerged
- Speed: 17.7 knots (32.8 km/h; 20.4 mph) surfaced; 7.66 knots (14.19 km/h; 8.81 mph) submerged
- Range: 13,700 nmi (25,400 km; 15,800 mi) at 10 knots (19 km/h; 12 mph) surfaced; 125 nmi (232 km; 144 mi) at 4 knots (7.4 km/h; 4.6 mph) submerged
- Test depth: 220 m (721 ft 9 in)
- Complement: 4 officers, 40–56 enlisted44-52 men
- Armament: 5 × 53.3 cm (21 in) torpedo tubes (four bow, one stern); 14 × torpedoes or 26 TMA mines; 1 × 8.8 cm (3.46 in) deck gun (220 rounds); 1 x 2 cm (0.79 in) C/30 AA gun

Service record
- Part of: 8th U-boat Flotilla; 26 March – 31 August 1942; 3rd U-boat Flotilla; 1 September 1942 – 7 August 1943
- Identification codes: M 45 089
- Commanders: Kptlt. Ralph Kapitzky; 26 March 1942 – 7 August 1943
- Operations: 4 patrols: 1st patrol: 5 September – 30 October 1942; 2nd patrol: 25 November 1942 – 9 January 1943; 3rd patrol: 18 February – 20 April 1943; 4th patrol: 12 June – 7 August 1943
- Victories: 4 merchant ships sunk (27,231 GRT)

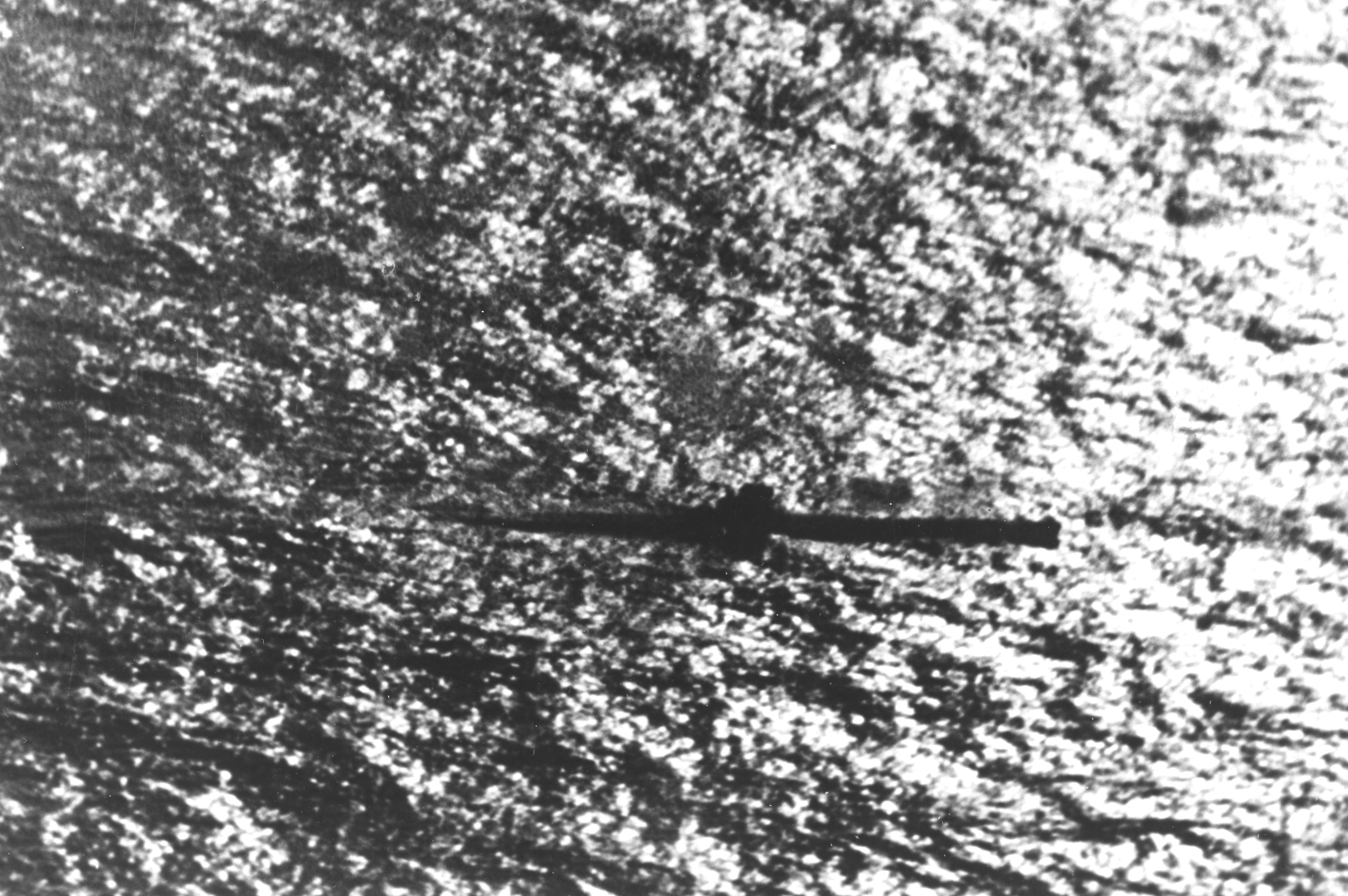
German submarine U-615 moving slowly on the surface of the Caribbean Sea, on 6 August 1943

German submarine U-615 was a Type VIIC U-boat of the German Navy (Kriegsmarine) for service during World War II.

Commissioned on 26 March 1942, and commanded by Kapitänleutnant Ralph Kapitzky, she was depth charged and sunk in the Caribbean Sea, north of Porlamar on 7 August 1943, in position 12°38′N 64°15′W, by 6 US Mariner and 1 Ventura aircraft. It was the largest aircraft hunt ever mounted for a single U-boat. Of her crew 4 (including her captain) were killed, and 43 survived.

== Design ==
German Type VIIC submarines were preceded by the shorter Type VIIB submarines. U-615 had a displacement of 769 tonnes (757 long tons) when at the surface and 871 tonnes (857 long tons) while submerged. She had a total length of 67.10 m (220 ft 2 in), a pressure hull length of 50.50 m (165 ft 8 in), a beam of 6.20 m (20 ft 4 in), a height of 9.60 m (31 ft 6 in), and a draught of 4.74 m (15 ft 7 in). The submarine was powered by two Germaniawerft F46 four-stroke, six-cylinder supercharged diesel engines producing a total of 2,800 to 3,200 metric horsepower (2,060 to 2,350 kW; 2,760 to 3,160 shp) for use while surfaced, two BBC GG UB 720/8 double-acting electric motors producing a total of 750 metric horsepower (550 kW; 740 shp) for use while submerged. She had two shafts and two 1.23 m (4 ft) propellers. The boat was capable of operating at depths of up to 230 metres (750 ft).

The submarine had a maximum surface speed of 17.7 knots (32.8 km/h; 20.4 mph) and a maximum submerged speed of 7.6 knots (14.1 km/h; 8.7 mph). When submerged, the boat could operate for 80 nautical miles (150 km; 92 mi) at 4 knots (7.4 km/h; 4.6 mph); when surfaced, she could travel 8,500 nautical miles (15,700 km; 9,800 mi) at 10 knots (19 km/h; 12 mph). U-615 was fitted with five 53.3 cm (21 in) torpedo tubes (four fitted at the bow and one at the stern), fourteen torpedoes, one 8.8 cm (3.46 in) SK C/35 naval gun, 220 rounds, and a 2 cm (0.79 in) C/30 anti-aircraft gun. The boat had a complement of between forty-four and sixty.

== Wolfpacks ==
U-615 took part in 10 wolfpacks, namely:

- Pfeil (12 – 22 September 1942)
- Blitz (22 – 26 September 1942)
- Tiger (26 – 30 September 1942)
- Wotan (5 – 19 October 1942)
- Draufgänger (1 – 11 December 1942)
- Ungestüm (11 – 30 December 1942)
- Burggraf (25 February – 5 March 1943)
- Raubgraf (7 – 20 March 1943)
- Seewolf (24 – 30 March 1943)
- Adler (7 – 13 April 1943)

== Summary of raiding history ==
Date	Ship Name	Nationality	Tonnage (GRT)	Fate
11 October 1942	El Lago	Panama	4,221	Sunk
23 October 1942	Empire Star	United Kingdom	12,656	Sunk
11 April 1943	Edward B. Dudley	United States	7,177	Sunk
28 July 1943	Rosalia	Netherlands	3,177	Sunk

== Bibliography ==
- Busch, Rainer; Röll, Hans-Joachim (1999). German U-boat commanders of World War II : a biographical dictionary. Translated by Brooks, Geoffrey. London, Annapolis, Md: Greenhill Books, Naval Institute Press. ISBN 1-55750-186-6.
- Busch, Rainer; Röll, Hans-Joachim (1999). Der U-Boot-Krieg, 1939-1945: Deutsche U-Boot-Verluste von September 1939 bis Mai 1945 [German U-boat losses from September 1939 to May 1945] (in German). Vol. IV. Hamburg, Berlin, Bonn: Mittler. ISBN 3-8132-0514-2.
- Edwards, Bernard (1996). Dönitz and the Wolf Packs - The U-boats at War. Cassell Military Classics. p. 139. ISBN 0-304-35203-9.
- Gröner, Eric; Jung, Dieter; Maass, Martin (1991). German Warships 1815-1945: U-boats and Mine Warfare Vessels. Vol. 2. Translated by Thomas, Keith; Magowan, Rachel. London: Conway Maritime Press. ISBN 0-85177-593-4.
