= German submarine U-254 =

German World War II submarine

Coordinates: 55°0′N 40°0′W

History

Nazi Germany
- Name: U-254
- Ordered: 23 September 1939
- Builder: Bremer Vulkan, Bremen-Vegesack
- Yard number: 19
- Laid down: 14 December 1940
- Launched: 20 September 1941
- Commissioned: 8 November 1941
- Fate: Sunk after collision with U-221, 8 December 1942

General characteristics
- Class & type: Type VIIC submarine
- Displacement: 769 tonnes (757 long tons) surfaced; 871 t (857 long tons) submerged
- Length: 67.10 m (220 ft 2 in) o/a; 50.50 m (165 ft 8 in) pressure hull
- Beam: 6.20 m (20 ft 4 in) o/a; 4.70 m (15 ft 5 in) pressure hull
- Height: 9.60 m (31 ft 6 in)
- Draught: 4.74 m (15 ft 7 in)
- Installed power: 2,800–3,200 PS (2,100–2,400 kW; 2,800–3,200 bhp) (diesels); 750 PS (550 kW; 740 shp) (electric)
- Propulsion: 2 shafts; 2 × diesel engines; 2 × electric motors
- Speed: 17.7 knots (32.8 km/h; 20.4 mph) surfaced; 7.6 knots (14.1 km/h; 8.7 mph) submerged
- Range: 8,500 nmi (15,700 km; 9,800 mi) at 10 knots (19 km/h; 12 mph) surfaced; 80 nmi (150 km; 92 mi) at 4 knots (7.4 km/h; 4.6 mph) submerged
- Test depth: 230 m (750 ft); Crush depth: 250–295 m (820–968 ft)
- Complement: 4 officers, 40–56 enlisted
- Armament: 5 × 53.3 cm (21 in) torpedo tubes (four bow, one stern); 14 × torpedoes or 26 TMA mines; 1 × 8.8 cm (3.46 in) deck gun (220 rounds); 1 × 2 cm (0.79 in) C/30 anti-aircraft gun

Service record
- Part of: 8th U-boat Flotilla; 8 November 1941 – 31 July 1942; 9th U-boat Flotilla; 1 August – 8 December 1942
- Identification codes: M 41 903
- Commanders: Kptlt. Hans Gilardone; 8 November 1941 – 8 December 1942; Kptlt. Odo Loewe; September – October 1942
- Operations: 3 patrols: 1st patrol: 14 July – 19 August 1942; 2nd patrol: 21 September – 22 October 1942; 3rd patrol: 21 November – 8 December 1942
- Victories: 3 merchant ships sunk (18,553 GRT)

German submarine U-254 was a Type VIIC U-boat of Nazi Germany's Kriegsmarine, built for service in the Second World War and the Battle of the Atlantic. She was a mildly successful boat which carried out three war patrols, but fell victim to a freak accident during an attack on an Allied convoy in the mid-Atlantic Ocean on her third patrol and was lost.

Built in 1941 at Vegesack, U-254 was commanded for all her brief career by Kapitänleutnant Hans Gilardone, except for a brief period of illness, when Kptlt. Odo Loewe took command for her second patrol. She conducted her warm-up and training period in the Baltic Sea in the first half of 1942, before she was despatched to Kiel from where she participated in her first war operations.

== Design ==
German Type VIIC submarines were preceded by the shorter Type VIIB submarines. U-254 had a displacement of 769 tonnes (757 long tons) when at the surface and 871 tonnes (857 long tons) while submerged. She had a total length of 67.10 m (220 ft 2 in), a pressure hull length of 50.50 m (165 ft 8 in), a beam of 6.20 m (20 ft 4 in), a height of 9.60 m (31 ft 6 in), and a draught of 4.74 m (15 ft 7 in). The submarine was powered by two Germaniawerft F46 four-stroke, six-cylinder supercharged diesel engines producing a total of 2,800 to 3,200 metric horsepower (2,060 to 2,350 kW; 2,760 to 3,160 shp) for use while surfaced, two AEG GU 460/8–27 double-acting electric motors producing a total of 750 metric horsepower (550 kW; 740 shp) for use while submerged. She had two shafts and two 1.23 m (4 ft) propellers. The boat was capable of operating at depths of up to 230 metres (750 ft).

The submarine had a maximum surface speed of 17.7 knots (32.8 km/h; 20.4 mph) and a maximum submerged speed of 7.6 knots (14.1 km/h; 8.7 mph). When submerged, the boat could operate for 80 nautical miles (150 km; 92 mi) at 4 knots (7.4 km/h; 4.6 mph); when surfaced, she could travel 8,500 nautical miles (15,700 km; 9,800 mi) at 10 knots (19 km/h; 12 mph). U-254 was fitted with five 53.3 cm (21 in) torpedo tubes (four fitted at the bow and one at the stern), fourteen torpedoes, one 8.8 cm (3.46 in) SK C/35 naval gun, 220 rounds, and one 2 cm (0.79 in) C/30 anti-aircraft gun. The boat had a complement of between forty-four and sixty.

== Service history ==
=== First patrol ===
Her first war patrol was a simple one, entailing a passage between Kiel and her new home base in Brest in occupied France. During this month-long journey, U-254 was ordered to spend sometime cruising off Reykjavík, Iceland, hoping to catch some stragglers from northern convoys or supply ships running to the Allied forces stationed on the island. She had one success, sinking a small British freighter on 2 August before she headed for her new home.

=== Second patrol ===
Her second patrol was more eventful, when on 3 October, after twelve days of cruising, she spotted the 11,237 GRT American tanker Esso Williamsburg in the central North Atlantic and sank her with one torpedo, killing 28. This was followed six days later by another success in a similar area, when the 6,098 GRT British ship Pennington Court was sunk by three torpedoes with all 45 crew on board.

The promising career of U-254 was almost cut short on this cruise, when the Norwegian Flower-class corvette HNoMS Eglantine damaged her with depth charges during an attack on a convoy in the same area as her previous victories.

=== Third patrol ===
After repairs, U-254 departed in late November 1942, returning to her old operating grounds of the North Atlantic routes. In December, the weather in the region is atrocious and visibility practically nil, so as U-254 maneuvered to attack Convoy HX 217, to which she had been directed on 8 December, it is perhaps unsurprising that her crew failed to see U-221 come steaming out of the gloom and straight into her broadside. The two submarines had become lost in the dark and collided with one another in a freak accident, which claimed 41 of U-254's crew, who were spilled into the ocean as the boat heeled over and sank. Sailors from U-221 dived into the turbulent sea tied to ropes, and succeeded in rescuing four bedraggled survivors of the sinking. U-221 was badly damaged. Unable to dive, Oberleutnant zur See Trojer aborted the patrol and returned to St. Nazaire, France.

== Summary of raiding history ==
Date	Ship	Nationality	Tonnage (GRT)	Fate
2 August 1942	Flora II	United Kingdom	1,218	Sunk
3 October 1942	Robert H Colley	United States	11,237	Sunk
9 October 1942	Pennington Court	United Kingdom	6,098	Sunk

== Bibliography ==
- Busch, Rainer; Röll, Hans-Joachim (1999). German U-boat commanders of World War II: a biographical dictionary. Translated by Brooks, Geoffrey. London, Annapolis MD: Greenhill Books, Naval Institute Press. ISBN 1-55750-186-6.
- Busch, Rainer; Röll, Hans-Joachim (1999). Der U-Boot-Krieg, 1939-1945: Deutsche U-Boot-Verluste von September 1939 bis Mai 1945 [German U-boat losses from September 1939 to May 1945] (in German). Vol. IV. Hamburg, Berlin, Bonn: Mittler. ISBN 3-8132-0514-2.
- Gröner, Eric; Jung, Dieter; Maass, Martin (1991). German Warships 1815-1945: U-boats and Mine Warfare Vessels. Vol. 2. Translated by Thomas, Keith; Magowan, Rachel. London: Conway Maritime Press. ISBN 0-85177-593-4.
- Kemp, Paul (1999). U-Boats Destroyed - German Submarine Losses in the World Wars. London: Arms & Armour. ISBN 1-85409-515-3.
- Sharpe, Peter (1998). U-Boat Fact File. Midland Publishing. ISBN 1-85780-072-9.
