= German submarine U-221 =

German World War II submarine

Coordinates: 47°0′N 18°0′W

History

Nazi Germany
- Name: U-221
- Ordered: 15 August 1940
- Builder: Germaniawerft, Kiel
- Yard number: 651
- Laid down: 16 June 1941
- Launched: 14 March 1942
- Commissioned: 9 May 1942
- Fate: Sunk, 27 September 1943

General characteristics
- Class & type: Type VIIC submarine
- Displacement: 769 tonnes (757 long tons) surfaced; 871 t (857 long tons) submerged
- Length: 67.10 m (220 ft 2 in) o/a; 50.50 m (165 ft 8 in) pressure hull
- Beam: 6.20 m (20 ft 4 in) o/a; 4.70 m (15 ft 5 in) pressure hull
- Height: 9.60 m (31 ft 6 in)
- Draught: 4.74 m (15 ft 7 in)
- Installed power: 2,800–3,200 PS (2,100–2,400 kW; 2,800–3,200 bhp) (diesels); 750 PS (550 kW; 740 shp) (electric)
- Propulsion: 2 shafts; 2 × diesel engines; 2 × electric motors
- Speed: 17.7 knots (32.8 km/h; 20.4 mph) surfaced; 7.6 knots (14.1 km/h; 8.7 mph) submerged
- Range: 8,500 nmi (15,700 km; 9,800 mi) at 10 knots (19 km/h; 12 mph) surfaced; 80 nmi (150 km; 92 mi) at 4 knots (7.4 km/h; 4.6 mph) submerged
- Test depth: 230 m (750 ft); Crush depth: 250–295 m (820–968 ft)
- Complement: 4 officers, 40–56 enlisted
- Armament: 5 × 53.3 cm (21 in) torpedo tubes (four bow, one stern); 14 × torpedoes or 26 TMA mines; 1 × 8.8 cm (3.46 in) deck gun (220 rounds); 1 x 2 cm (0.79 in) C/30 AA gun

Service record
- Part of: 5th U-boat Flotilla; 9 May – 31 August 1942; 7th U-boat Flotilla; 1 September 1942 – 27 September 1943
- Identification codes: M 45 566
- Commanders: Oblt.z.S. / Kptlt. Hans-Hartwig Trojer; 9 May 1942 – 27 September 1943
- Operations: 5 patrols: 1st patrol: 3 September – 22 October 1942; 2nd patrol: 23 November – 23 December 1942; 3rd patrol: 27 February – 28 March 1943; 4th patrol: 3 May – 21 July 1943; 5th patrol: 20 – 27 September 1943
- Victories: 11 merchant ships sunk (69,589 GRT); 10 warships sunk (759 tons); 1 merchant ship damaged (7,197 GRT)

German submarine U-221 was a Type VIIC U-boat of Nazi Germany's Kriegsmarine during World War II.

Ordered on 15 August 1940 from the Germaniawerft shipyard in Kiel, she was laid down on 16 June 1941 as yard number 651, launched on 14 March 1942 and commissioned on 9 May 1942 under the command of Kapitänleutnant Hans-Hartwig Trojer.

A member of twelve wolfpacks, she sank a total of Twenty one ships for a total of 69,589 gross register tons (GRT) and 759 tons in five patrols. In addition, she damaged one ship with a total tonnage of 7,197 GRT.

== Design ==
German Type VIIC submarines were preceded by the shorter Type VIIB submarines. U-221 had a displacement of 769 tonnes (757 long tons) when at the surface and 871 tonnes (857 long tons) while submerged. She had a total length of 67.10 m (220 ft 2 in), a pressure hull length of 50.50 m (165 ft 8 in), a beam of 6.20 m (20 ft 4 in), a height of 9.60 m (31 ft 6 in), and a draught of 4.74 m (15 ft 7 in). The submarine was powered by two Germaniawerft F46 four-stroke, six-cylinder supercharged diesel engines producing a total of 2,800 to 3,200 metric horsepower (2,060 to 2,350 kW; 2,760 to 3,160 shp) for use while surfaced, two AEG GU 460/8–27 double-acting electric motors producing a total of 750 metric horsepower (550 kW; 740 shp) for use while submerged. She had two shafts and two 1.23 m (4 ft) propellers. The boat was capable of operating at depths of up to 230 metres (750 ft).

The submarine had a maximum surface speed of 17.7 knots (32.8 km/h; 20.4 mph) and a maximum submerged speed of 7.6 knots (14.1 km/h; 8.7 mph). When submerged, the boat could operate for 80 nautical miles (150 km; 92 mi) at 4 knots (7.4 km/h; 4.6 mph); when surfaced, she could travel 8,500 nautical miles (15,700 km; 9,800 mi) at 10 knots (19 km/h; 12 mph). U-221 was fitted with five 53.3 cm (21 in) torpedo tubes (four fitted at the bow and one at the stern), fourteen torpedoes, one 8.8 cm (3.46 in) SK C/35 naval gun, 220 rounds, and a 2 cm (0.79 in) C/30 anti-aircraft gun. The boat had a complement of between forty-four and sixty.

== Service history ==
U-221 is also credited with the destruction of ten allied landing craft (nine LCMs and one LCT), which were lost aboard the British merchantman Southern Empress when that ship was sunk by torpedo on 14 October 1942.

== First patrol ==
U-221 left Kristiansand on 3 September 1942 having moved to the Norwegian port a day earlier. Her route took her through the gap between Iceland and the Faroe Islands. She claimed her first victim, Fagersten, about 500 nmi (930 km; 580 mi) east of the Belle Isle Strait, in Newfoundland on 13 October. In the same attack, she sank Ashworth and Senta. There were no survivors from either vessel.

The next day she sank two more ships by torpedo. Susana went down in six minutes, northeast of St. Johns.Three hours later, she sank Southern Empress, whose deck cargo included ten landing craft.

U-221 docked in St Nazaire on 22 October.

== Second patrol ==
The boat's second foray was one of anti-climax and failure. She scoured the Atlantic west of Ireland, but failed to find any targets. On 8 December U-221 and U-254 collided in heavy fog, resulting in the loss of the latter. U-221 was badly damaged. Unable to dive, Oberleutnant zur See Trojer aborted the patrol and returned to St. Nazaire.

== Third patrol ==
Her third sortie was more fruitful. Jamaica was sunk in just two minutes, on 7 March 1943. As survivors took to the boats, Trojer surfaced and took the ship's Fourth Engineer prisoner, but on March 21, the man, during an exercise period, jumped overboard and was lost. The boat sank Tucurina on the tenth, southeast of Cape Farewell, (Greenland). In the same attack, the U-boat sank Andrea F. Luckenbach and damaged Lawton B. Evans (not sunk probably due to a dud torpedo).

The convoy's escorts from HX 228 caused some damage to U-221. Repairs were carried out at sea, enabling the boat to sink two more ships on 18 March: Canadian Star and Walter Q. Gresham.

== Fourth patrol ==
U-221 sank only one ship on this patrol, Sandanger; the survivors had a remarkable escape. Occupying the only intact lifeboat, they found themselves in an area of low pressure created by the ship's burning fuel cargo. The flames were split in two by strong winds, which also kept them above the men's heads by only a few feet, as they rowed clear of the location.

== Fifth patrol and loss ==
U-221 left St. Nazaire for the last time on 20 September 1943. On the 27th she was attacked southwest of Ireland by a Handley Page Halifax of No. 58 Squadron RAF with eight depth charges. The U-boat was seen to sink by the stern, but the aircraft was also hit, forcing the pilot to ditch about three miles away. Two gunners from the Halifax were lost; the U-boat was sunk with all hands (50 men).

=== Wolfpacks ===
U-221 took part in twelve wolfpacks, namely:

- Pfeil (12 – 22 September 1942)
- Blitz (22 – 26 September 1942)
- Tiger (26 – 30 September 1942)
- Wotan (5 – 18 October 1942)
- Draufgänger (29 November - 9 December 1942)
- Neuland (8 – 13 March 1943)
- Dränger (14 – 20 March 1943)
- Drossel (11 – 15 May 1943)
- Oder (17 – 19 May 1943)
- Mosel (19 – 24 May 1943)
- Trutz (1 – 16 June 1943)
- Trutz 3 (16 – 29 June 1943)

== Summary of raiding history ==
Date	Name	Nationality	Tonnage (Note: Merchant ship tonnages are in gross register tons. Military vessels are listed by tons displacement.)	Fate
13 October 1942	Ashworth	United Kingdom	5,227	Sunk
13 October 1942	Fagersten	Norway	2,342	Sunk
13 October 1942	Senta	Norway	3,785	Sunk
14 October 1942	Southern Empress	United Kingdom	12,398	Sunk
14 October 1942	HMS LCM-508 (Note: Carried by "Southern Empress".)	Royal Navy	52	Sunk
14 October 1942	HMS LCM-509	Royal Navy	52	Sunk
14 October 1942	HMS LCM-519	Royal Navy	52	Sunk
14 October 1942	HMS LCM-522	Royal Navy	52	Sunk
14 October 1942	HMS LCM-523	Royal Navy	52	Sunk
14 October 1942	HMS LCM-532	Royal Navy	52	Sunk
14 October 1942	HMS LCM-537	Royal Navy	52	Sunk
14 October 1942	HMS LCM-547	Royal Navy	52	Sunk
14 October 1942	HMS LCM-620	Royal Navy	52	Sunk
14 October 1942	HMS LCT-2006	Royal Navy	291	Sunk
14 October 1942	Susana	United States	5,929	Sunk
7 March 1943	Jamaica	Norway	3,015	Sunk
10 March 1943	Andrea F. Luckenbach	United States	6,565	Sunk
10 March 1943	Lawton B. Evans	United States	7,197	Damaged
10 March 1943	Tucurinca	United Kingdom	5,412	Sunk
18 March 1943	Canadian Star	United Kingdom	8,293	Sunk
18 March 1943	Walter Q. Gresham	United States	7,191	Sunk
18 March 1943	Sandanger	Norway	9,432	Sunk

== See also ==
- German submarine U-254

== Bibliography ==
- Busch, Rainer; Röll, Hans-Joachim (1999). German U-boat commanders of World War II : a biographical dictionary. Translated by Brooks, Geoffrey. London, Annapolis, Md: Greenhill Books, Naval Institute Press. ISBN 1-55750-186-6.
- Busch, Rainer; Röll, Hans-Joachim (1999). Deutsche U-Boot-Verluste von September 1939 bis Mai 1945 [German U-boat losses from September 1939 to May 1945]. Der U-Boot-Krieg (in German). Vol. IV. Hamburg, Berlin, Bonn: Mittler. ISBN 3-8132-0514-2.
- Edwards, Bernard (1996). Dönitz and the Wolf Packs - The U-boats at War. Cassell Military Classics. pp. 132, 173, 208. ISBN 0-304-35203-9.
- Gröner, Erich; Jung, Dieter; Maass, Martin (1991). U-boats and Mine Warfare Vessels. German Warships 1815–1945. Vol. 2. Translated by Thomas, Keith; Magowan, Rachel. London: Conway Maritime Press. ISBN 0-85177-593-4.
- Kemp, Paul (1999). U-boats destroyed : German submarine losses in the World Wars. London: Arms & Armour. ISBN 1-85409-515-3. OCLC 43972253.
