= Battle of Cape Burnas =

1942 naval battle

Coordinates: 45°53′N 30°19′E

- Part of the Black Sea Campaigns of the Eastern Front of World War II
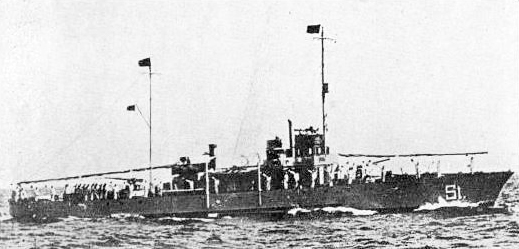
- Romanian gunboat Stihi Eugen
Date	1 October 1942
Location	Cape Burnas, Romania
Result	Soviet submarine sank

Belligerents
(Kingdom of Romania) Romania; Germany	Soviet Union

Strength
2 gunboats 1 transport ship 1 flying boat	1 submarine

Casualties and losses
1 transport ship sunk	1 submarine sunk 16–19 killed 2,000 Soviet POWs killed aboard the sunken German ship

The Battle of Cape Burnas was a naval engagement between the Soviet and Romanian navies near the Burnas Lagoon in October 1942.

On 1 October 1942, the Soviet M-class submarine M-118 attacked and sank the German transport ship Salzburg, which was carrying on board 2,000 Soviet prisoners of war. After attacking, the submarine was located by a German BV 138C flying boat, and the Romanian gunboats Sublocotenent Ghiculescu and Stihi Eugen were sent to the scene. The two Romanian warships attacked the Soviet submarine with depth-charges, sinking her with all hands.

== Alternative versions ==
Recent surveys in the area failed to find the wreck in the alleged sinking location and it has been raised the alternative version that M-118 was lost due to a German seaplane attack or from a Romanian field barrage "S-30".

At the same time, one source reported that two Soviet submarines were sunk by Romanian surface units. There are several Soviet submarines claimed to have been sunk by Romanian surface warships, but the two most valid claims are the M-118 and Shch-206, sunk on 9 July 1941.
