= German submarine U-179 =

German World War II submarine

Coordinates: 33°28′S 17°05′E

History

Nazi Germany
- Name: U-179
- Ordered: 28 May 1940
- Builder: DeSchiMAG AG Weser, Bremen
- Yard number: 1019
- Laid down: 15 January 1941
- Launched: 18 November 1941
- Commissioned: 7 March 1942
- Fate: Sunk, 8 October 1942

General characteristics
- Class & type: Type IXD2 submarine
- Displacement: 1,610 t (1,580 long tons) surfaced; 1,799 t (1,771 long tons) submerged
- Length: 87.58 m (287 ft 4 in) o/a; 68.50 m (224 ft 9 in) pressure hull
- Beam: 7.50 m (24 ft 7 in) o/a; 4.40 m (14 ft 5 in) pressure hull
- Height: 10.20 m (33 ft 6 in)
- Draught: 5.35 m (17 ft 7 in)
- Installed power: 9,000 PS (6,620 kW; 8,880 bhp) (diesels); 1,000 PS (740 kW; 990 shp) (electric)
- Propulsion: 2 shafts; 2 × diesel engines; 2 × electric motors
- Speed: 20.8 knots (38.5 km/h; 23.9 mph) surfaced; 6.9 knots (12.8 km/h; 7.9 mph) submerged
- Range: 12,750 nmi (23,610 km; 14,670 mi) at 10 knots (19 km/h; 12 mph) surfaced; 57 nmi (106 km; 66 mi) at 4 knots (7.4 km/h; 4.6 mph) submerged
- Test depth: 230 m (750 ft)
- Complement: 55 to 63
- Armament: 6 × torpedo tubes (four bow, two stern); 24 × 53.3 cm (21 in) torpedoes; 1 × 10.5 cm (4.1 in) SK C/32 deck gun (150 rounds); 1 × 3.7 cm (1.5 in) SK C/30; 1 × 2 cm (0.79 in) C/30 anti-aircraft guns

Service record
- Part of: 4th U-boat Flotilla; 7 March - 31 August 1942; 10th U-boat Flotilla; 1 – 30 September 1942; 12th U-boat Flotilla; 1 – 8 October 1942
- Identification codes: M 43 832
- Commanders: K.Kapt. / F.Kapt. Ernst Sobe; 7 March - 8 October 1942
- Operations: 1 patrol: 15 August - 8 October 1942
- Victories: 1 merchant ship sunk (6,558 GRT)

German submarine U-179 was a Type IXD2 U-boat of Nazi Germany's Kriegsmarine built for service during World War II.

Ordered on 28 May 1940, the U-boat was laid down on 15 January 1941 at the DeSchiMAG AG Weser yard in Bremen as yard number 1019, launched on 18 November, and commissioned on 7 March 1942, under the command of Korvettenkapitän Ernst Sobe.

== Design ==
German Type IXD2 submarines were considerably larger than the original Type IXs. U-179 had a displacement of 1,610 tonnes (1,580 long tons) when at the surface and 1,799 tonnes (1,771 long tons) while submerged. The U-boat had a total length of 87.58 m (287 ft 4 in), a pressure hull length of 68.50 m (224 ft 9 in), a beam of 7.50 m (24 ft 7 in), a height of 10.20 m (33 ft 6 in), and a draught of 5.35 m (17 ft 7 in). The submarine was powered by two MAN M 9 V 40/46 supercharged four-stroke, nine-cylinder diesel engines plus two MWM RS34.5S six-cylinder four-stroke diesel engines for cruising, producing a total of 9,000 metric horsepower (6,620 kW; 8,880 shp) for use while surfaced, two Siemens-Schuckert 2 GU 345/34 double-acting electric motors producing a total of 1,000 shaft horsepower (1,010 PS; 750 kW) for use while submerged. She had two shafts and two 1.85 m (6 ft) propellers. The boat was capable of operating at depths of up to 200 metres (660 ft).

The submarine had a maximum surface speed of 20.8 knots (38.5 km/h; 23.9 mph) and a maximum submerged speed of 6.9 knots (12.8 km/h; 7.9 mph). When submerged, the boat could operate for 121 nautical miles (224 km; 139 mi) at 2 knots (3.7 km/h; 2.3 mph); when surfaced, she could travel 12,750 nautical miles (23,610 km; 14,670 mi) at 10 knots (19 km/h; 12 mph). U-179 was fitted with six 53.3 cm (21 in) torpedo tubes (four fitted at the bow and two at the stern), 24 torpedoes, one 10.5 cm (4.13 in) SK C/32 naval gun, 150 rounds, and a 3.7 cm (1.5 in) SK C/30 with 2575 rounds as well as one 2 cm (0.79 in) C/38 anti-aircraft gun with 8100 rounds. The boat had a complement of fifty-five.

== First patrol and loss ==
U-179 sailed from Kiel on 8 September 1942 into the Atlantic, passing north of Scotland and then turned southwest through the gap between Iceland and the Faroe Islands. She headed south for the waters around Cape Town. She made her only kill on 8 October, sinking the unescorted SS City of Athens. All but one of the 99 crewmen survived. The survivors managed to recover a cat from the wreckage after the sinking.

The boat was sunk by depth charges from the British destroyer HMS Active west southwest of Cape Town in South Africa on 8 October 1942. Sixty-one men died, there were no survivors.

== Summary of raiding history ==
Date	Name	Nationality	Tonnage (GRT)	Fate
8 October 1942	City of Athens	United Kingdom	6,558	Sunk

== Gallery ==
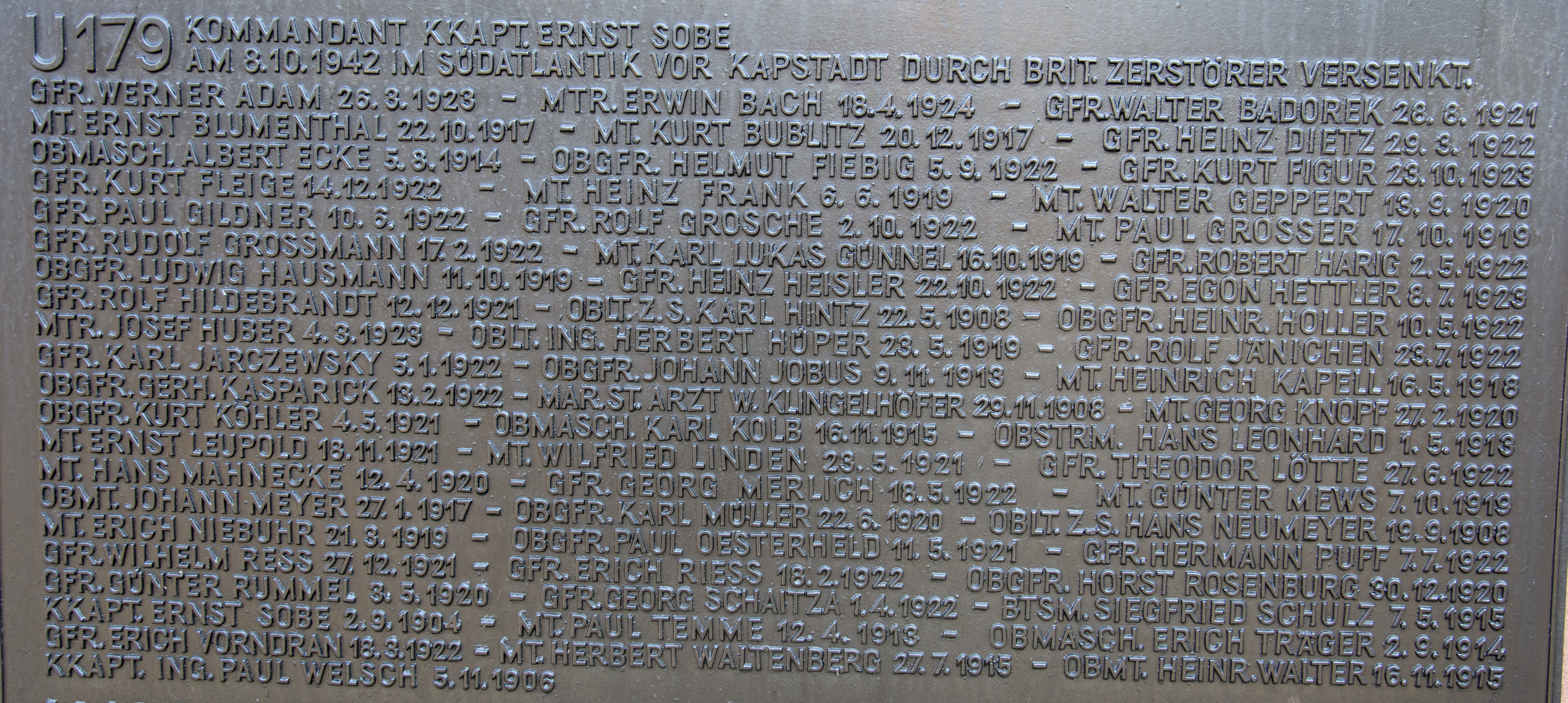
U179 Memorial Plaque, Kiel

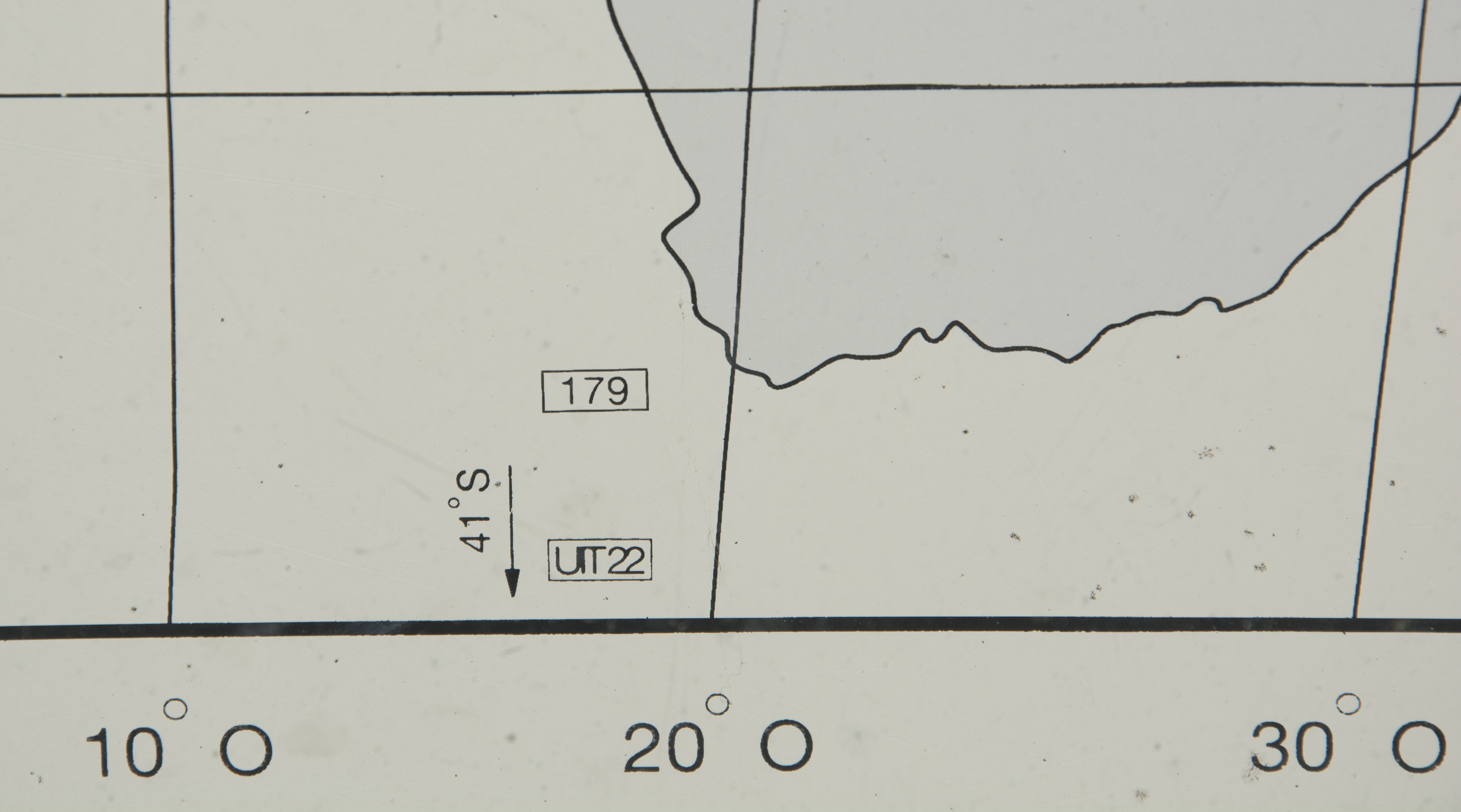
U179 Last position off Cape Town

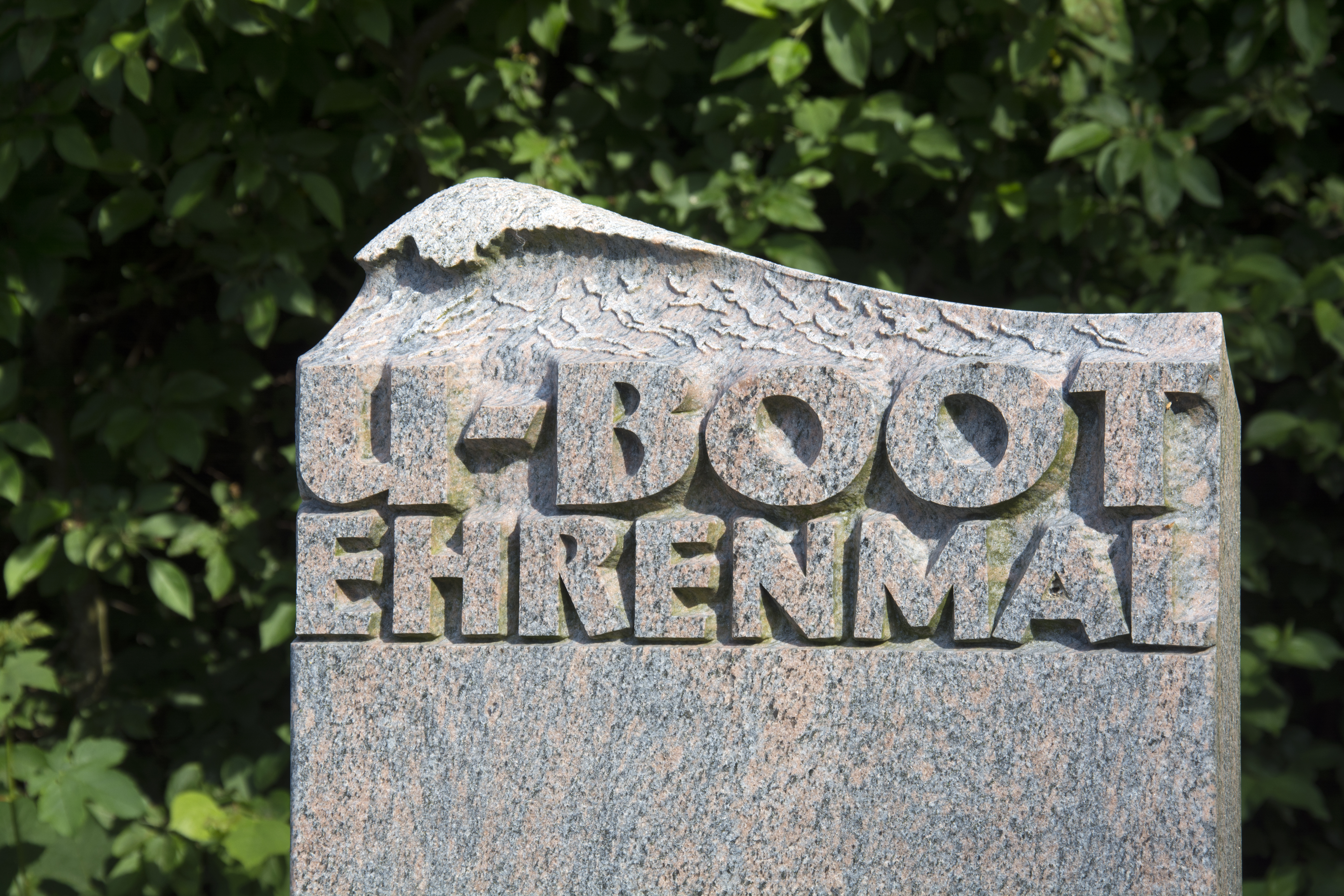
U-Boat Memorial, Kiel

== Bibliography ==
- Busch, Rainer; Röll, Hans-Joachim (1999). German U-boat commanders of World War II : a biographical dictionary. Translated by Brooks, Geoffrey. London, Annapolis, Md: Greenhill Books, Naval Institute Press. ISBN 1-55750-186-6.
- Busch, Rainer; Röll, Hans-Joachim (1999). Deutsche U-Boot-Verluste von September 1939 bis Mai 1945 [German U-boat losses from September 1939 to May 1945]. Der U-Boot-Krieg (in German). Vol. IV. Hamburg, Berlin, Bonn: Mittler. ISBN 3-8132-0514-2.
- Gröner, Erich; Jung, Dieter; Maass, Martin (1991). U-boats and Mine Warfare Vessels. German Warships 1815–1945. Vol. 2. Translated by Thomas, Keith; Magowan, Rachel. London: Conway Maritime Press. ISBN 0-85177-593-4.
- Kemp, Paul (1999). U-Boats Destroyed - German Submarine Losses in the World Wars. London: Arms & Armour. ISBN 1-85409-515-3.
