= HMSAS Protea (1947) =

Survey ship of the South African navy

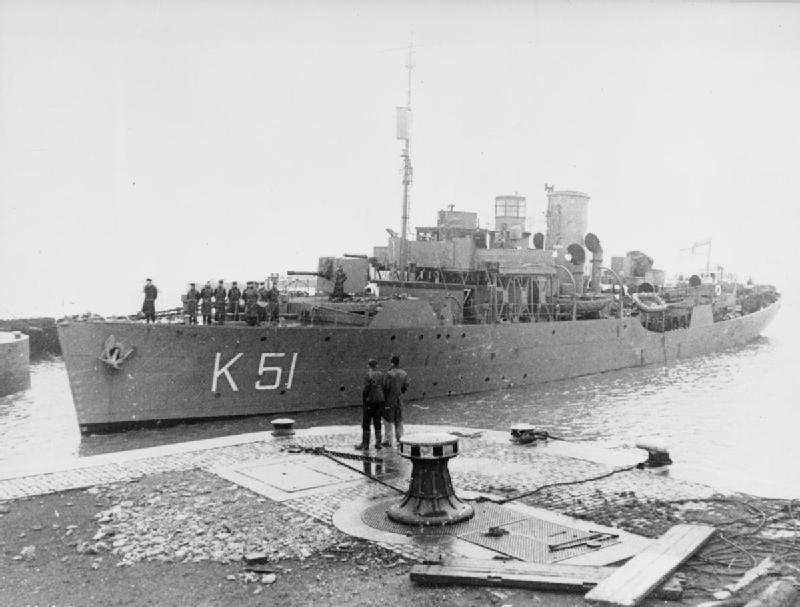
- HMS Rockrose during the Second World War

History

United Kingdom
- Name: HMS Rockrose
- Namesake: Rock-rose
- Ordered: 21 September 1939
- Builder: Charles Hill & Sons, Bristol
- Yard number: 284
- Laid down: 28 October 1940
- Launched: 26 July 1941
- Completed: 4 November 1941
- Out of service: 4 October 1947
- Identification: Pennant number: K51
- Fate: Sold to South African Navy, 1947

South Africa
- Name: HMSAS Protea
- Namesake: Protea
- Acquired: 1947
- Commissioned: 4 October 1947
- Decommissioned: January 1957
- Renamed: Protea, February 1950; Justin, 1963
- Reclassified: As a fishing trawler, 1964
- Fate: Sold out of the navy, 1962; Scrapped, 1967

General characteristics (as built)
- Class & type: Flower-class corvette
- Displacement: 940 long tons (955 t) (standard); 1,180 long tons (1,199 t) (deep load)
- Length: 205 ft (62 m) o/a
- Beam: 33 ft 2 in (10.11 m)
- Draught: 13 ft 7 in (4.14 m)
- Installed power: 2 × cylindrical boilers; 2,750 ihp (2,050 kW)
- Propulsion: 1 × shaft; 1 × triple-expansion steam engine
- Speed: 16 knots (30 km/h; 18 mph)
- Range: 5,000 nmi (9,300 km; 5,800 mi) at 10 knots (19 km/h; 12 mph)
- Complement: 85
- Sensors & processing systems: Type 271 surface-search radar; Type 123A ASDIC
- Armament: 1 × 4 in (102 mm) gun; 2 racks, 2 throwers for 40 depth charges

HMSAS Protea was a survey ship of the South African Navy. The ship was originally built as a Flower-class corvette for the Royal Navy during World War II and served as HMS Rockrose (pennant number: K51). Rockrose was initially assigned to convoy escort duties in the North Atlantic after her completion in 1941 but was later transferred to South African waters and then to the Far East with the same mission. She returned home in 1945 and was paid off.

Two years later the ship was purchased by South Africa and was converted into a survey ship in 1949. Protea was obsolete by the late 1950s and was placed in reserve in 1957. The ship was sold in 1962 and was converted into a fishing trawler with the name of Justin. The company subsequently failed and she was scrapped in 1967.

== Description ==
Rockrose displaced 940 long tons (960 t) at standard load and 1,080 long tons (1,100 t) at deep load. The ship had an overall length of 205 feet (62.5 m), a beam of 33 feet 2 inches (10.1 m) and a deep draught of 13 feet 7 inches (4.1 m). She was powered by a single vertical triple-expansion steam engine using steam provided by two cylindrical boilers. The engine developed 2,750 indicated horsepower (2,050 kW) which gave a maximum speed of 16 knots (30 km/h; 18 mph). The ship carried 230 long tons (234 t) of fuel oil that gave her a range of 5,000 nautical miles (9,300 km; 5,800 mi) at 10 knots (19 km/h; 12 mph). Rockrose was armed with a single BL 4-inch (102 mm) Mk IX gun and two twin mounts for .303-inch (7.7 mm) Lewis light machine guns. For anti-submarine work, she was fitted with two depth charge rails and a pair of depth charge throwers for her 40 depth charges. The ship was equipped with a Type 271 surface-search radar and a Type 123A ASDIC. Rockrose was one of those Flower-class ships that had an extended forecastle and her crew numbered 85 officers and ratings.

As part of her conversion to a survey ship in 1949–50, the ship was disarmed and her interior was extensively reworked to improve her endurance and accommodations. Her bridge was remodelled to improve visibility and a pair of echo sounders were fitted in addition to a navigational radar and direction-finding gear. The changes increased her displacement to 1,080 long tons (1,100 t) at standard and 1,340 long tons (1,360 t) at deep load. Her crew now consisted of 82 officers and ratings.

== Construction and career ==
Rockrose was named after the rock-rose flower. The ship was ordered on 21 September 1939 from Charles Hill & Sons and was laid down on 28 October 1940 at its Bristol shipyard as yard number 284. She was launched on 26 July 1941 and completed four months later on 4 November. Rockrose was initially assigned to the North Atlantic for convoy escort work, but was transferred to the South Atlantic in 1942. The ship never engaged the enemy, but rescued survivors from sunken ships on 8, 10 and 29 October of that year. She was later transferred to the Far East and returned home in 1945, after which she was placed in reserve at Devonport Royal Dockyard.

Rockrose was purchased by South Africa in 1947 for conversion into a hydrographic survey ship and was commissioned in the South African Navy on 4 October after a brief refit. Together with the newly purchased minesweepers Rosamund and Pelorus, she arrived at Cape Town on 24 December. While awaiting for her conversion to begin, the ship was docked at Salisbury Island, Durban. Gilbert Hamer & Co. of Durban finally began work in mid-1949 and she was recommissioned as HMSAS Protea in February 1950. In late 1952, the ship sailed from Port Elizabeth to Marion Island to bring back a patient for an appendectomy and arrived back at Port Elizabeth with only 15 long tons (15.2 t) of fuel remaining.

The following year, she participated in Queen Elizabeth II's coronation celebrations in Port Elizabeth. By the late 1950s, the ship's limitations were becoming apparent, particularly her limited space and electrical power, and Protea was reduced to reserve in January 1957. She was listed for disposal in March 1961 and was subsequently purchased by Johannesburg businessman Ernest Bisogno, owner of Maritime Fisheries (Pty) Ltd, for R4,000. The ship was towed from Simon's Town to Cape Town in October 1963, after having been renamed Justin, for an overhaul and then sailed for Durban to begin conversion into a refrigerated tuna fishing trawler. Her owners were not successful and the ship was broken up in Table Bay in late 1967.
