= German transport Salzburg =

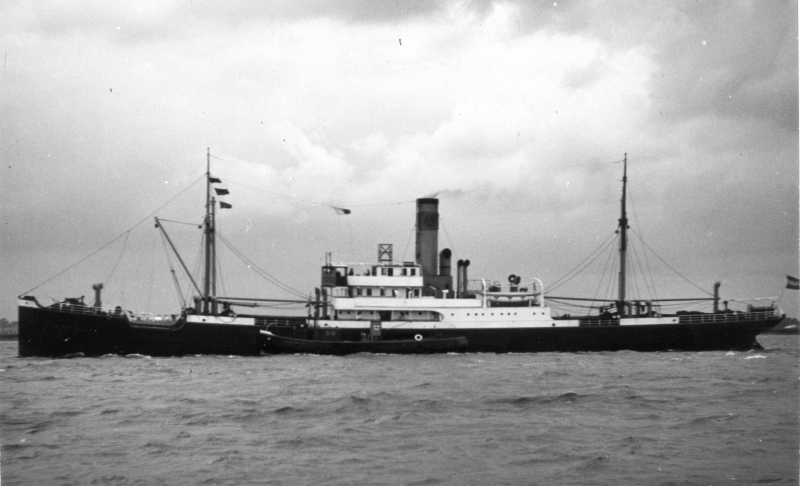
- Jonge Anthony

History
- Name: (Netherlands) Slot Loevestein (1921-1924); (Netherlands) Jonge Anthony (1924-1939); (Nazi Germany) Salzburg (1939-1942)
- Namesake: Salzburg
- Owner: Schuldt H. - Flensburger Dampfer Compagnie - Ozean Dampfer A.G.
- Port of registry: Flensburg, Germany
- Builder: De Groot & V. Vliet
- Yard number: 78
- Completed: February 1922
- Acquired: 1921
- In service: 1922
- Out of service: 1 October 1942
- Identification: DKBF
- Fate: Torpedoed by Soviet submarine M-118 and sunk

General characteristics
- Type: Transport ship
- Tonnage: 1,742 GRT
- Length: 85.1 metres (279 ft 2 in)
- Beam: 9.8 metres (32 ft 2 in)
- Depth: 5.4 metres (17 ft 9 in)
- Installed power: 1 x 3-cyl. triple expansion engine
- Propulsion: Screw propeller
- Speed: 12 knots

SS Salzburg was a German transport ship that was torpedoed by the Soviet submarine M-118 and sank on 1 October 1942 east of Lake Shahany, Ukraine.

== Construction ==
Salzburg was constructed in 1921 at the De Groot & V. Vliet shipyard in Rotterdam, Netherlands. She was completed in 1921. The ship was 85.1 metres (279 ft 2 in) long, with a beam of 9.8 metres (32 ft 2 in) and a depth of 5.4 metres (17 ft 9 in). The ship was assessed at 1,742 GRT. She had 1 x 3-cyl. triple expansion engine driving a single screw propeller. The engine was rated at 241 nhp.

== Sinking ==
Salzburg was torpedoed east of Lake Shahany by the Soviet submarine M-118 on 1 October 1942 while she was carrying 2,200 Russian prisoners of war from Burghaz to Odessa. About 2,000 prisoners and 2 crew members went down with the ship and the M-118 was attacked and sunk that same day by two Romanian minesweepers in the battle of Cape Burnas.

== Wreck ==
The exact location of the wreck is unknown, but it is believed to lie at (45°54′N 30°19′E).
