= ORP Krakowiak (1954) =

Polish submarine

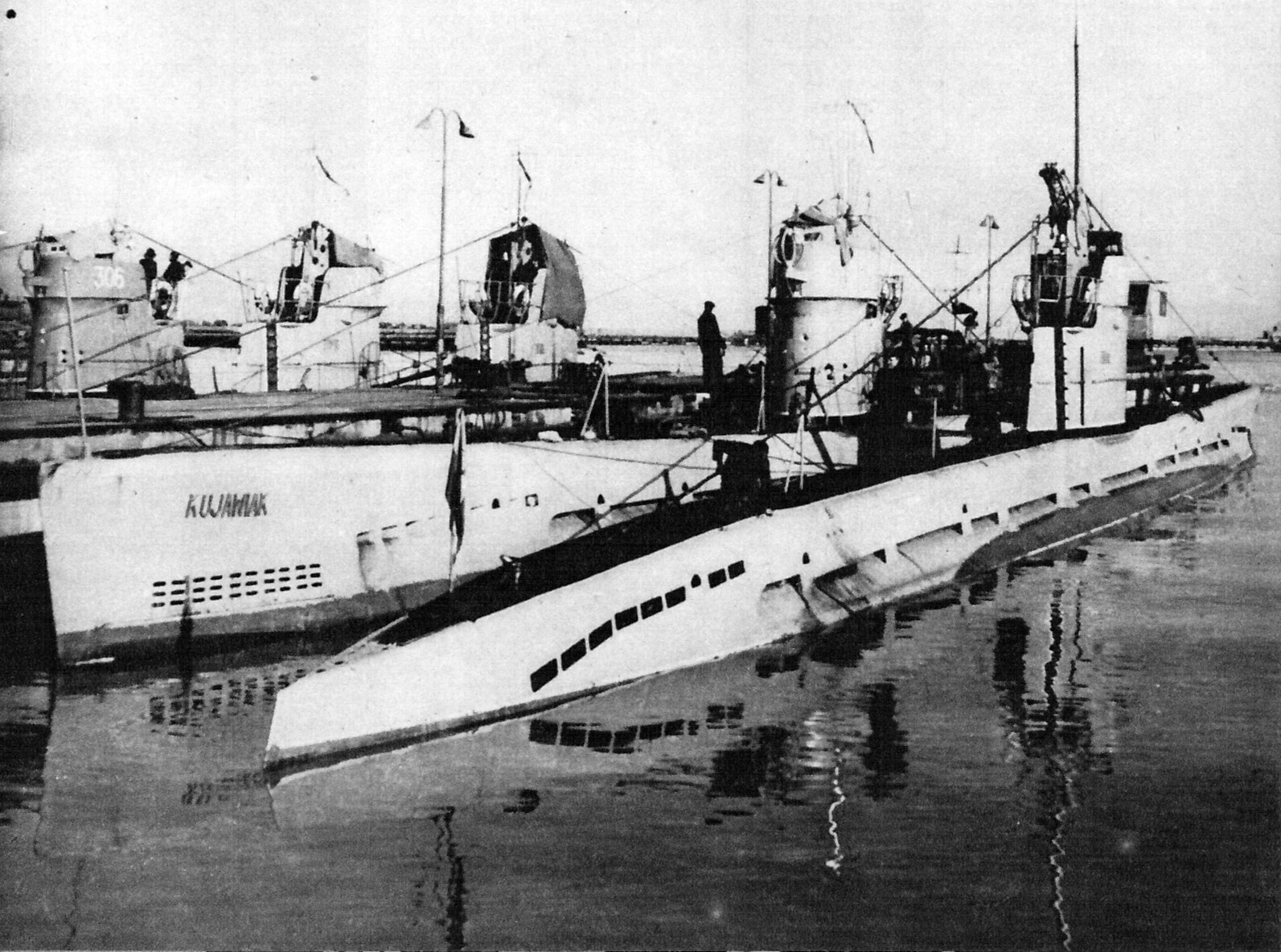
- Polish M-class submarines in port

History

Soviet Union
- Name: M-279
- Builder: Sudomekh Shipyard, Leningrad
- Laid down: 12 October 1950
- Launched: 10 February 1951
- Commissioned: 9 June 1951
- Decommissioned: 6 July 1955

History

Poland
- Name: ORP Krakowiak
- Commissioned: 18 October 1954
- Decommissioned: 15 March 1965
- Fate: Scrapped in 1966

General characteristics
- Class & type: M-XV
- Displacement: surfaced: 283 t (279 long tons); submerged: 353 t (347 long tons)
- Length: 49.5 m (162 ft 5 in)
- Beam: 4.4 m (14 ft 5 in)
- Draft: 2.6–2.8 m (8 ft 6 in – 9 ft 2 in)
- Propulsion: 2 diesel engines, 441 kW (600 hp) each; 2 electric motors, 160 kW (218 hp) each; 4 propellers
- Speed: surfaced: 15.7 kn (29.1 km/h; 18.1 mph); submerged: 7.8 kn (14.4 km/h; 9.0 mph)
- Range: surfaced: 4,500 nautical miles at a speed of 8 kn (15 km/h; 9.2 mph); submerged: 85 nautical miles at a speed of 2.9 kn (5.4 km/h; 3.3 mph)
- Crew: 31
- Armament: 1 × 45 mm dual-purpose gun; 4 torpedoes; 4 × 533 mm torpedo tubes

Profile of an M-class submarine

ORP Krakowiak was a Polish submarine of the Cold War era, originally the Soviet M-279, one of six Soviet M-class submarines leased to Poland. With a displacement of 283 tonnes surfaced and 353 tonnes submerged, its primary armament consisted of four 533 mm torpedoes launched from four internal torpedo tubes. The submarine achieved a surface speed exceeding 15 knots, with a range of 4,500 nautical miles at 8 knots.

Launched on 10 February 1951 at the Sudomekh Shipyard in Leningrad, the submarine was commissioned into the Soviet Navy on 9 June 1951, assigned to the Baltic Fleet. Leased to Poland in 1954, it was commissioned into the Polish Navy on 18 October 1954. Bearing the pennant numbers M-102, P-102, and later 303, the submarine was intensively operated until its decommissioning on 15 March 1965, after which it was scrapped.

== Design and construction ==
Development of small M-class submarines began in the Soviet Union in the 1930s, with serial production of Series VI, VIbis, and XII, totaling 96 units (30 Series VI, 20 Series VIbis, and 46 Series XII). In the late 1930s, to expand the Soviet Navy, work started on a new small submarine design based on the Series XII. On 13 August 1938, the tactical-technical specifications for a larger version were approved. In August 1938, chief engineer Fiodor Połuszkin of the Rubin Design Bureau developed two preliminary designs, M-VI and M-VII, with M-VII selected for further development. This design featured a semi-double-hull structure, four torpedo tubes, a twin-shaft engine room with increased power, and enhanced range and diving depth. External saddle ballast tanks were detachable, enabling rail transportation.

On 23 July 1939, the M-VII design was approved by the Soviet Navy, and the Rubin Design Bureau developed the detailed Project 96 (Series XV) documentation, finalized on 8 February 1940. On 31 March 1940, the keels of the first two Project 96 units, M-200 and M-201, were laid at the Sudomekh Shipyard in Leningrad. During World War II, 15 Series XV submarines were under construction at Sudomekh and the Krasnoye Sormovo Factory No. 112 in Gorky, with only four completed by the war's end; a total of 57 units were built by 1953, generally to the same specifications, aside from equipment upgrades.

M-279 was constructed at Shipyard No. 196 in Leningrad (yard number 509). Its keel was laid on 12 October 1950, and it was launched on 10 February 1951. For comparison, M-236, also built at Shipyard No. 196 (yard number 355), had its keel laid on 19 February 1947 and was launched on 19 June 1948, while M-274 (yard number 504) was laid down on 29 April 1950 and launched on 18 September 1950.

== Technical specifications ==
=== General characteristics ===
ORP Krakowiak was a small submarine with a semi-double-hull design, intended for coastal operations and suited to the wave conditions of the Baltic Sea. Constructed from steel using welding joints, the hull was divided by five watertight bulkheads into six compartments, from bow to stern: I – torpedo room (with sailors' bunks), II – crew quarters, III – main control room, IV – additional crew quarters, V – diesel engines, and VI – electric motors. A sail was located above the control room, with rechargeable batteries beneath the crew quarters. External saddle ballast tanks were positioned along the port and starboard from mid-compartment I to mid-compartment V, with an additional ballast tank at the stern within the pressure hull; a trim tank and quick-diving tank were located under compartment III. Bow rudders were positioned at the torpedo compartment, with stern diving planes and a single rudder aft of the propellers.

The overall length was 49.5 metres, beam 4.4 metres, and draft ranged from 2.6 metres at the bow to 2.8 metres at the stern. Normal surface displacement was 283 tonnes, and submerged displacement was 353 tonnes. The maximum test depth was 80 metres, with an operational depth of 60 metres. The maximum continuous submerged endurance was 48 hours. The autonomy was 14 days.

The crew comprised 31 personnel: 6 officers, 15 non-commissioned officers, and 10 sailors.

=== Propulsion ===
The submarine was powered on the surface by two 11D diesel engines, each producing 441 kW (600 hp), with exhausts vented through pipes to the sail. Submerged propulsion was provided by two PG-17 electric motors, each delivering 160 kW (218 hp). Two shafts driving two propellers enabled a maximum speed of 15.7 knots surfaced and 7.8 knots submerged (economical speeds were 10 and 3 knots, respectively). The range was 4,500 nautical miles at 8 knots surfaced and 85 nautical miles at 2.9 knots submerged (or 965 nautical miles at maximum surface speed and 9.7 nautical miles at maximum submerged speed). The fuel capacity was 28 tonnes. Electrical energy was stored in two 2-MS lead-acid batteries, each with 60 galvanic cells.

=== Armament and equipment ===
The submarine was equipped with four fixed bow torpedo tubes of 533 mm caliber, carrying four torpedoes. It used steam-powered 53-38 torpedoes, each 7.19 metres long, weighing 1,615 kg (including a 300 kg explosive warhead) with a contact fuze. The torpedo's range was 4,000 metres at 44.5 knots or 8,000 metres at 34.5 knots. Guidance was provided by a gyroscope, with a diving depth of 0 to 14 metres. Torpedoes could be launched from depths up to 30 metres and were loaded from the bow in port using a crane, with the stern submerged and bow raised via ballast tanks.

The initial artillery armament was a single 45 mm 21-KM deck gun mounted forward of the sail, with 200 rounds of ammunition. The gun weighed 867 kg, with an elevation range of -10° to +85°, a horizontal range of 11,000 metres, and a vertical range of 7,000 metres. It used fixed ammunition weighing 2.389 kg (projectile 1.43 kg, propellant 0.384 kg, case 0.575 kg), including fragmentation-tracer, fragmentation, incendiary, armor-piercing-tracer, and cast iron (blanks) rounds, fired at a rate of 30–40 rounds per minute.

Some sources mention the possibility of carrying AMD-500 bottom mines instead of torpedoes, but as these were aviation mines, Polish Series XV submarines did not carry them. Other sources suggest the submarine was also armed with two 7.62 mm machine guns.

Electronic equipment included an R-641 radio with a mast antenna for communication at a periscope depth of 5 metres, a Mars-16K passive sonar with a range of 30 cables, and a radio direction finder with an antenna on the sail. A single PZ-7 periscope served as the optical detection system. Rescue equipment included a rescue buoy with a wired telephone, radio signal transmitter, and signal light, as well as RUKTY devices that absorbed carbon dioxide and released oxygen.

== Service history ==
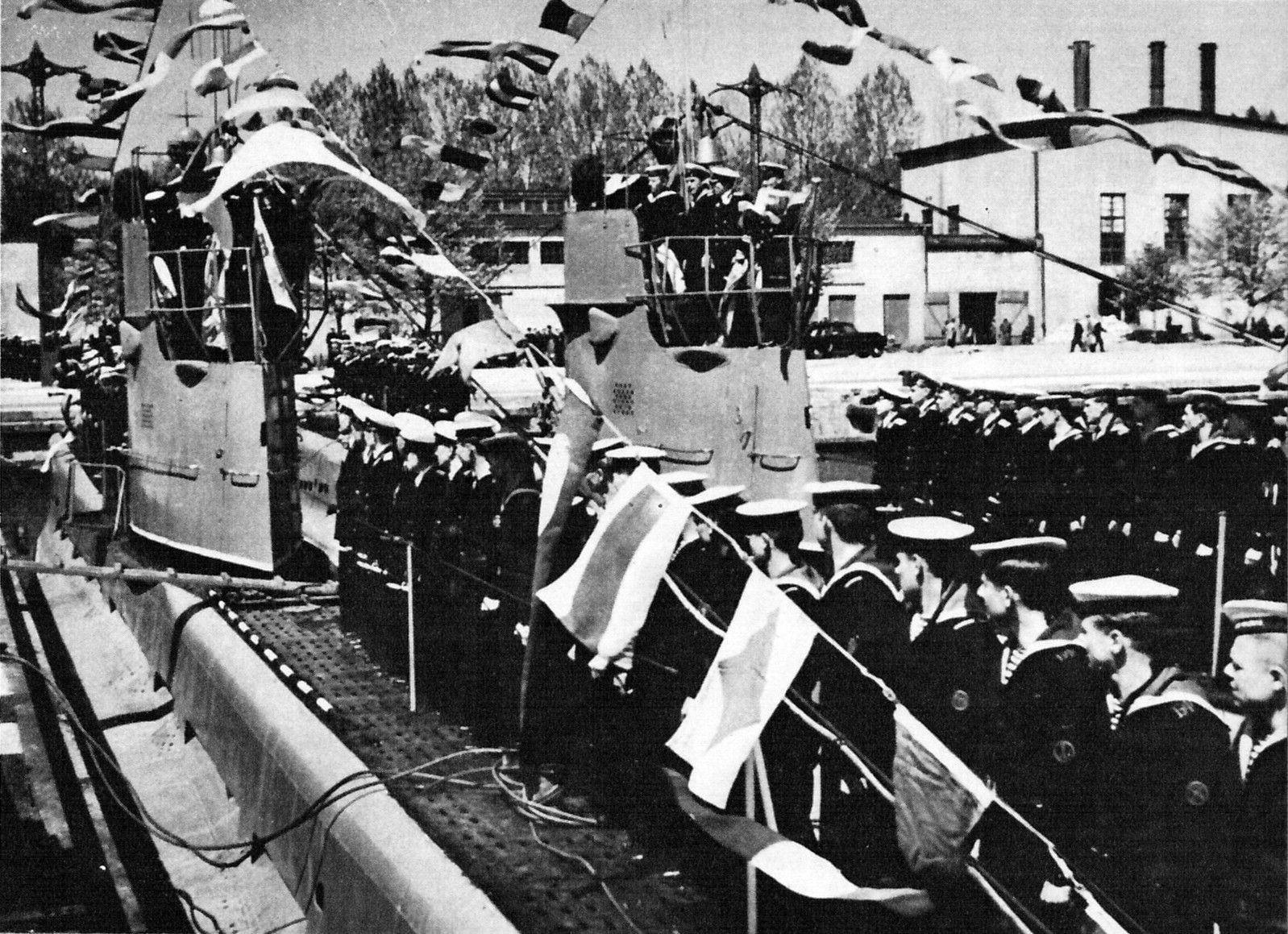
Polish acquisition of M-class submarines in 1954 or 1955

M-279 was commissioned into the Soviet Navy on 9 June 1951 and assigned to the Baltic Fleet.

In 1953, due to the deteriorating condition of the Polish Submarine Division's ORP Ryś and ORP Żbik, Poland negotiated with the Soviet Union to lease submarines and submarine chasers. In 1954, the Soviet Union agreed to lease four Project 96 submarines, followed by two more in 1955, along with four Kronshtadt-class submarine chasers. The lease term for the submarines was eight years, costing 93,000 rubles annually per unit.

On 18 October 1954, M-279 and another submarine were commissioned into the Polish Navy as ORP Krakowiak and ORP Ślązak, formalized by Naval Command Order No. 055/Org. of 20 October 1954. The first Polish commander was Lieutenant Leon Ratajczak. Designated M-102, ORP Krakowiak joined the Submarine Division alongside ORP Sęp, ORP Ryś, ORP Żbik, ORP Kaszub, and ORP Mazur. Soviet sailors remained on board initially to train the Polish crew. The submarine's technical condition was poor, requiring a months-long shipyard overhaul in 1955; technical documentation was also lacking. On 16 September 1955, ORP Krakowiak was assigned to the newly formed 1st Submarine Brigade, replacing the Submarine Division. By year's end, it earned the title of the Polish Navy's leading ship.

In 1956, the 1st Submarine Brigade was tasked with preparing submarines for coastal operations with air support, training in group torpedo attacks, reconnaissance, base blockades, evading ASW forces, and navigating ASW defense zones. In 1957, tasks included refining day and night operations, reconnaissance, base blockades, torpedo firing, disrupting enemy communications, patrol duties, and training in deploying small sabotage teams. In 1957, six brigade submarines (Krakowiak, Kaszub, Kujawiak, Mazur, Sęp, and Ślązak) participated in the Reda '57 fleet exercise. In March, Krakowiak, Mazur, and Kurp conducted a training-navigation cruise to Szczecin and Świnoujście. In July and August, Krakowiak, Kujawiak, and Kurp sailed autonomously to the North Sea, reaching the eastern coast of Great Britain. That summer, the 45 mm deck gun was removed. On 15 December 1957, the pennant number changed from M-102 to P-102.

In subsequent years, all Polish Project 96 submarines conducted intensive training cruises, regular torpedo firings, simulated attacks on enemy communications, base blockades, reconnaissance, and coordination with surface ships and aircraft. In 1958, ORP Krakowiak sailed to the Danish Straits and North Sea. It again earned the title of the Polish Navy's leading ship. On 1 January 1960, the pennant number changed to 303. Due to deteriorating hull conditions, the Naval Command restricted the maximum diving depth to 40 metres and submerged operations to waters no deeper than 60 metres. That summer, Krakowiak, Kurp, Mazur, and Ślązak participated in the Warsaw Pact's Bałtyk maneuvers. From 25 to 29 September, a Polish Navy task force led by Captain Henryk Pietraszkiewicz, including the destroyer ORP Wicher, minesweeper ORP Rosomak, and submarines ORP Krakowiak and ORP Ślązak, visited Rostock.

In 1961 and 1962, ORP Krakowiak was named the best submarine of the 1st Submarine Brigade. In 1962, Poland purchased the leased submarines from the Soviet Union for 400,000 PLN each. From April to July 1962, the submarine underwent a hull inspection and maintenance in a dry dock at the Remontowa shipyard. That autumn, the Naval Command's Technical Committee recommended decommissioning all Project 96 submarines due to difficulties assessing hull integrity without Soviet documentation, further limiting the diving depth to 20 metres. In mid-1963, Krakowiak and Mazur were relegated to secondary status due to their technical condition.

The final flag-lowering ceremony occurred on 15 March 1965, and the submarine was struck from the fleet on 31 March, per Naval Command Order No. 019/Org. of 13 March 1965. The crew was disbanded under Order No. 058/Org. of 9 September 1965. The decommissioned submarine was sent to the Regional Scrap Depot in Gdańsk for scrapping, completed in 1966.

== Bibliography ==
- Górski, Tadeusz (2011). "Malutki ORP "Krakowiak"" [Small ORP "Krakowiak"]. Okręty Wojenne (in Polish). 4 (108). Tarnowskie Góry: Wydawnictwo Okręty Wojenne. ISSN 1231-014X.
- Rochowicz, Robert (2017). "Malutkie pod polską banderą" [Small Submarines Under the Polish Flag]. Morze (in Polish). 4 (19). ZBiAM. ISSN 2543-5469.
- Sołkiewicz, Henryk, ed. (2018). Ewolucyjny rozwój sił okrętowych Marynarki Wojennej w latach 1945–2010 [Evolutionary Development of the Polish Navy's Naval Forces 1945–2010] (in Polish) (2nd ed.). Gdynia; Warsaw: Akademia Marynarki Wojennej. ISBN 978-83-65409-84-3.
