= ORP Ślązak (1954) =

Polish Cold War-era submarine

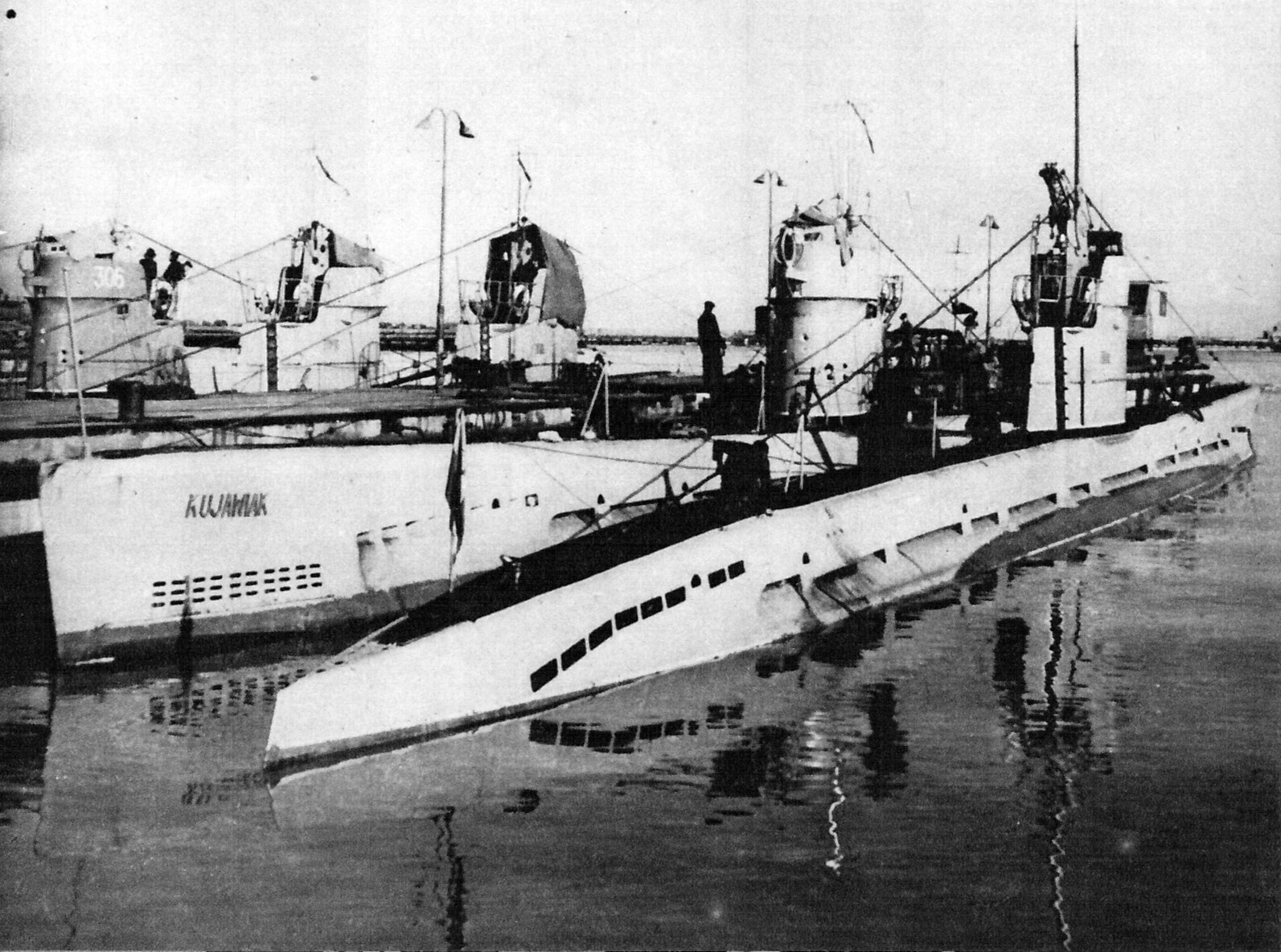
- Polish M-class submarines in port

History

Soviet Union
- Name: M-270
- Builder: Sudomekh Shipyard, Leningrad
- Laid down: December 23, 1949
- Launched: April 24, 1950
- Commissioned: July 29, 1950
- Decommissioned: December 30, 1954

Poland
- Name: ORP Ślązak
- Commissioned: October 18, 1954
- Decommissioned: October 20, 1965
- Fate: sunk as a target ship

General characteristics
- Class & type: M-class submarine
- Displacement: surfaced: 283 t (279 long tons); submerged: 353 t (347 long tons)
- Length: 49.5 m (162 ft 5 in)
- Beam: 4.4 m (14 ft 5 in)
- Draft: 2.6–2.8 m (8 ft 6 in – 9 ft 2 in)
- Propulsion: 2 diesel engines, 441 kW (591 hp) each; 2 electric motors, 160 kW (210 hp) each; 2 propellers
- Speed: surfaced: 15.7 kn (29.1 km/h; 18.1 mph); submerged: 7.8 kn (14.4 km/h; 9.0 mph)
- Range: surfaced: 4,500 nmi (8,300 km; 5,200 mi) at 8 kn (15 km/h; 9.2 mph); submerged: 85 nmi (157 km; 98 mi) at 2.9 kn (5.4 km/h; 3.3 mph)
- Complement: 31
- Armament: 1 universal gun, 45 mm (1.8 in) caliber; 4 torpedoes; torpedo tubes: 4 × 533 mm (21.0 in)

ORP Ślązak was a Polish Cold War-era submarine, originally the Soviet M-270, one of six M-XV-series (Project 96) vessels of the M type acquired by Poland. It displaced 283 tonnes (279 long tons) surfaced and 353 t (347 long tons) submerged, with its primary armament consisting of four 533-millimetre (21.0 in) torpedoes launched from four internal torpedo tubes. The submarine achieved a surface speed exceeding 15 knots (28 km/h; 17 mph), with a range of 4,500 nautical miles (8,300 km; 5,200 mi) at 8 knots (15 km/h; 9.2 mph).

Launched on 24 April 1950 at the Sudomekh Shipyard in Leningrad, it entered service with the Soviet Navy on 29 July 1950, assigned to the Baltic Fleet. In 1954, Poland leased the vessel, commissioning it into the Polish Navy on 18 October 1954. Designated with pennant numbers M-103, P-103, and later 304, it served extensively until decommissioned on 20 October 1965 and was subsequently sunk as a target ship in the Bay of Puck.

== Design and construction ==
Side profile of Project 96 (M-XV series) submarines

In the 1930s, the Soviet Union began serial production of small M-type submarines – VI, VIbis, and XII series – constructing 96 units (30 VI, 20 VIbis, 46 XII). By the late 1930s, with plans to expand the Soviet Navy, work started on a new small submarine design based on the XII series. On 13 August 1938, the tactical-technical specifications for these enlarged submarines were approved. That month, chief engineer F.F. Polushkin of the Rubin Design Bureau design bureau developed two preliminary designs, M-VI and M-VII, with M-VII selected for further development. This design featured a one-and-a-half-hull structure, four torpedo tubes, a twin-shaft propulsion system with increased power, and greater range and test depth. External saddle ballast tanks were detachable for railway transport.

On 23 July 1939, the M-VII design was approved by the Soviet Navy, and the Rubin Design Bureau finalized the working documentation as Project 96 (M-XV series), ratified on 8 February 1940. On 31 March 1940, keels for the first two Project 96 units – M-200 and M-201 – were laid at the Sudomekh Shipyard in Leningrad. During World War II, 15 M-XV series submarines were under construction at Sudomekh and the Krasnoye Sormovo Factory No. 112 in Gorky, but only four were completed by the war's end; by 1953, 57 units were built, largely to the same specifications (aside from equipment updates).

M-270 was built at the Sudomekh Shipyard in Leningrad (construction number 500). (Note: Pietlewannyj (2009, p. 108) states the ship was built at the Krasnoye Sormovo Factory No. 112 in Gorky.) Its keel was laid on 23 December 1949, and it was launched on 24 April 1950.

== Technical specifications ==
=== General characteristics ===
ORP Ślązak was a small, one-and-a-half-hull submarine designed for coastal operations, adapted to Baltic Sea wave conditions. Its steel hull was fully welded and divided by five watertight bulkheads into six compartments, from bow to stern: I – torpedo room (with sleeping berths), II – crew quarters (orlop deck), III – command center, IV – crew quarters, V – diesel engine room, and VI – electric motor room. The sail sat above the command center, with rechargeable batteries beneath the crew quarters. External saddle ballast tanks spanned both port and starboard from mid-compartment I to mid-compartment V, with an internal stern ballast tank; a submarine hull and quick-dive tank were under compartment III. Bow rudders were at the torpedo room level, with stern rudders and a single directional rudder aft of the propellers.

The length overall was 49.5 metres, beam 4.4 metres, and draft ranged from 2.6 metres at the bow to 2.8 metres at the stern. (Note: Pietlewannyj (2009, p. 108) lists a length of 50.5 metres.) Displacement was 283 tons surfaced and 353 tons submerged. Test depth was 80 metres, with an operational depth of 60 metres. (Note: Pietlewannyj (2009, p. 108) lists test depth as 60 metres and operational as 50 metres; Volkov & Brichevsky (2023) cite 70 and 60 metres, respectively.) Maximum submerged endurance was 48 hours. Endurance was 14 days.

The crew comprised 6 officers, 15 petty officers, and 10 sailors (31 total).

=== Propulsion ===
Surfaced propulsion came from two 11D diesel engines, each producing 441 kW (600 hp), with exhausts routed through the conning tower. Submerged propulsion relied on two PG-17 electric motors, each delivering 160 kW (218 hp). Twin propeller shafts drove two propellers, achieving maximum speeds of 15.7 knots surfaced and 7.8 knots submerged (economic speeds were 10 and 3 knots, respectively). Range was 4500 nautical miles at 8 knots surfaced and 85 nautical miles at 2.9 knots submerged (or 965 nautical miles surfaced and 9.7 nautical miles submerged at maximum speeds). Fuel capacity was 28 tons. Electric power was stored in two 2-MS lead-acid batteries, each with 60 cells.

=== Armament and equipment ===
The submarine mounted four fixed bow torpedo tubes of 533 mm, carrying four torpedoes. It used steam-gas torpedoes, type 53-38, 7.19 metres long, weighing 1,615 kg (including a 300 kg explosive warhead) with a contact fuze. Torpedo range was 4,000 metres at 44.5 knots or 8,000 metres at 34.5 knots. Guidance was via gyroscope, with depths from 0 to 14 metres. Torpedoes could be fired from 30 metres depth and were loaded at base via crane, submerging the stern and raising the bow with ballast tanks.

Artillery armament initially included a single 45 mm anti-aircraft gun forward of the conning tower, with 200 rounds. Weighing 867 kg, it had an elevation range of -10° to +85°, with a horizontal range of 11,000 metres and vertical range of 7,000 metres. It fired 2.389 kg cartridges (1.43 kg projectile, 0.384 kg propellant, 0.575 kg cartridge case), including fragmentation-tracer, fragmentation, incendiary, armor-piercing-tracer, and cast iron blanks, at 30–40 rounds per minute.

Some sources suggest it could carry AMD-500 bottom naval mines instead of torpedoes, but as these were aviation mines, Polish M-XV submarines did not use them. However, some sources claim it also carried two 7.62 mm machine guns.

Radio-electronic equipment included an R-641 radio station with a mast for periscope depth communication (5 metres), a Mars-16K passive sonar with a 30-cable range, and a radio direction finder with an antenna on the conning tower. A PZ-7 periscope served as the optical detection tool. Rescue equipment included an emergency buoy with a wired telephone, radio signal transmitter, and signal light, plus "RUKTY" devices for absorbing carbon dioxide and releasing oxygen.

== Service history ==
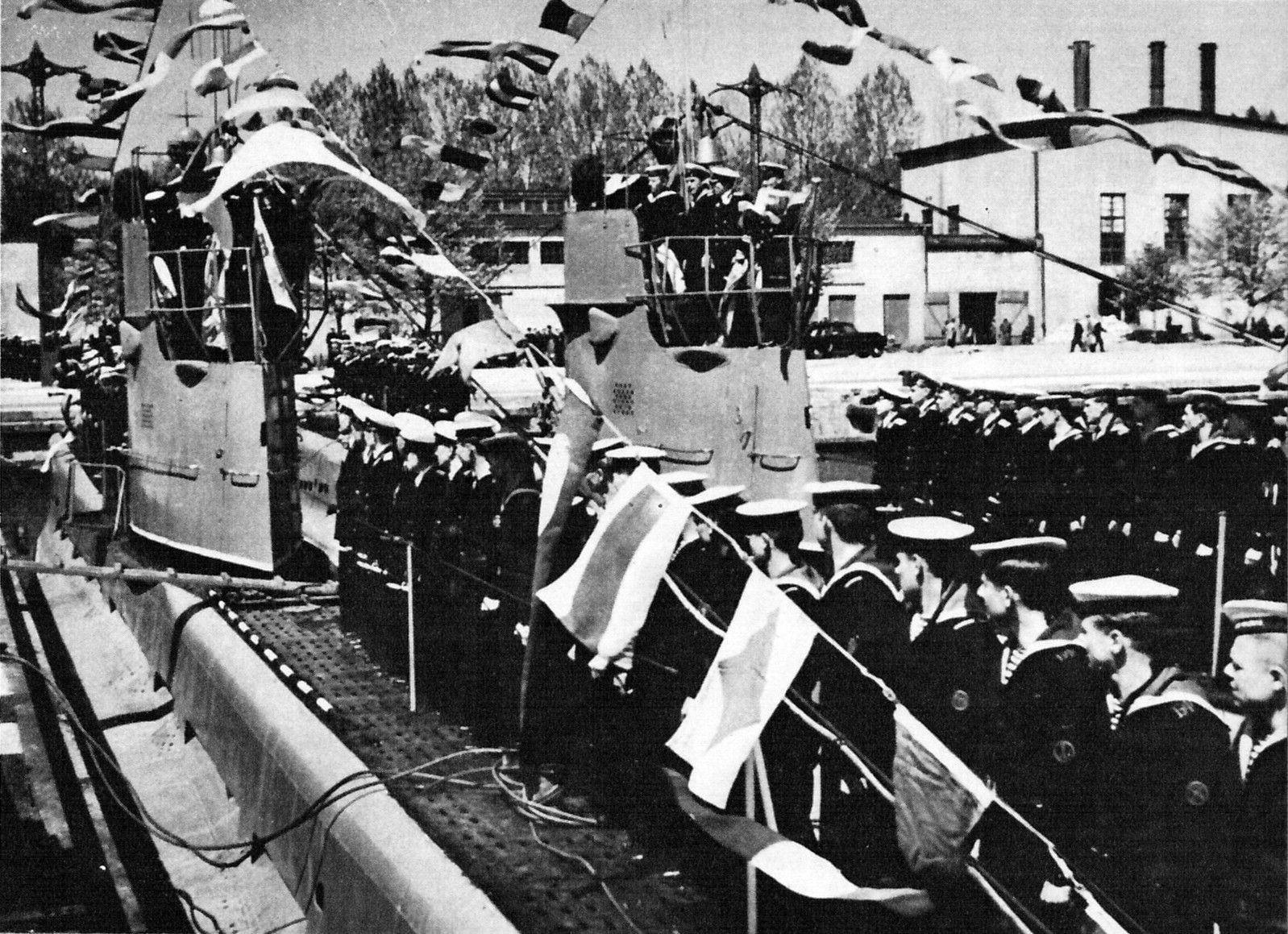
Poland taking over M-class submarines in 1954 or 1955

M-270 joined the Soviet Navy on 29 July 1950, assigned to the Baltic Fleet. In 1953, due to the deteriorating condition of ORP Ryś and ORP Żbik in Poland's Submarine Squadron, negotiations with the Soviet Union began to lease submarines and submarine chasers. In 1954, the Soviet Union agreed to lease four Project 96 submarines, followed by two more in 1955, plus four Project 122bis submarine chasers. The submarines' lease term was eight years, costing 93,000 rubles annually per unit.

On 18 October 1954, ORP Ślązak and ORP Krakowiak were ceremonially commissioned into the Polish Navy, per Navy Command Order No. 055/Org. of 20 October 1954. Its first Polish commander was Lieutenant Wacław Dwornikowski. With pennant number M-103, it joined the Submarine Squadron alongside ORP Sęp, ORP Ryś, ORP Żbik, ORP Kaszub, ORP Mazur, and ORP Krakowiak. Soviet sailors remained aboard initially to train the Polish crew. Due to poor condition and lack of technical documentation, it soon underwent a months-long shipyard overhaul. On 16 September 1955, it was reassigned to the 1st Submarine Brigade, replacing the disbanded Submarine Squadron.

In 1956, the 1st Brigade's tasks included preparing submarines for coastal operations with air support, training for group torpedo attacks, reconnaissance, base blockades, evading anti-submarine warfare (ASW), and breaching ASW defenses. In June 1956, ORP Ślązak, ORP Kujawiak, and ORP Kurp participated in fleet exercises in Gdańsk Bay. The 1957 training focused on day/night operations, reconnaissance, base blockades, torpedo firing, disrupting enemy communications, patrol duties, and landing small sabotage teams. That year, six 1st Brigade submarines (ORP Ślązak, ORP Kaszub, ORP Krakowiak, ORP Kujawiak, ORP Mazur, ORP Sęp) joined the Reda '57 fleet exercises. In summer 1957, the 45 mm deck gun was removed. On 15 December 1957, its pennant number changed to P-103.

In subsequent years, all Polish Project 96 submarines conducted intensive training cruises, regular torpedo drills, and simulated operations on enemy lines, base blockades, reconnaissance, and coordination with surface ships and aircraft. On 1 January 1960, its pennant number became 304. That year, due to deteriorating hull conditions, the Navy restricted Project 96 submarines to a 40-metre maximum depth and 60-metre seabed operations. In summer 1960, ORP Ślązak, ORP Krakowiak, ORP Kurp, and ORP Mazur joined Warsaw Pact "Bałtyk" maneuvers. From 25 to 29 September, a naval group under Captain Henryk Pietraszkiewicz, including ORP Wicher, ORP Rosomak, ORP Ślązak, and ORP Krakowiak, visited Rostock. In 1961, ORP Ślązak, ORP Kurp, and ORP Mazur participated in another "Bałtyk" exercise, and from 24 to 28 August, ORP Ślązak, ORP Kujawiak, and ORP Błyskawica visited Helsinki.

In 1962, Poland purchased the leased submarines from the Soviet Unionfor 400,000 PLN each. From April to July 1962, ORP Ślązak underwent a hull inspection and maintenance in Gdańsk shipyard Remontowa's dry dock. That fall, the Navy's Technical Committee recommended decommissioning all Project 96 units due to unassessable hull conditions from missing Soviet documentation, limiting depth to 20 metres. By mid-1963, ORP Ślązak became a training ship-combat vessel, remaining in first-line service, unlike ORP Krakowiak and ORP Mazur, relegated to second-line due to their condition. It frequently operated with the newly acquired Project 613 ORP Orzeł that year. On 27 June 1965, ORP Ślązak and ORP Kujawiak joined a parade off Gdynia for the Polish People's Navy's 20th anniversary.

ORP Ślązak's final flag lowering occurred on 20 October 1965 at Gdynia Naval Port, decommissioned that day per Navy Command Order No. 067/Org. of 16 October 1965. The crew disbanded under Order No. 014/Org. of 5 March 1966. Assigned to the 41st Rescue Squadron, it was adapted as a target ship and sunk by aircraft in Bay of Puck at 54°39′10.2″N 18°38′46.4″E on a 30-metre seabed.

== Bibliography ==
- Górski, Tadeusz (2011). "Malutki ORP "Krakowiak"" [Little ORP "Krakowiak"]. Okręty Wojenne (in Polish). 4 (108). Tarnowskie Góry: Wydawnictwo Okręty Wojenne. ISSN 1231-014X.
- Pietlewannyj, M.B. (2009). Korabli stran Warszawskogo dogowora Корабли стран Варшавского договора [Ships of the Warsaw Pact Countries] (in Russian). Sankt Petersburg: Galeja Print. ISBN 978-5-8172-0127-7.
- Rochowicz, Robert (2017). "Malutkie pod polską banderą" [Little Ones Under the Polish Flag]. Morze (in Polish). 4 (19). ZBiAM. ISSN 2543-5469.
- Rochowicz, Robert (1997). "Małe okręty podwodne projektu 96 (M-XV)" [Small Project 96 (M-XV) Submarines]. Nowa Technika Wojskowa (in Polish). 7. Magnum-X. ISSN 1230-1655.
- Serafin, Mieczysław (2008). Polska Marynarka Wojenna 1945–2007. Kronika wydarzeń [Polish Navy 1945–2007: Chronicle of Events] (in Polish). Gdynia: Zespół Redakcyjno-Wydawniczy Marynarki Wojennej. ISBN 978-83-88698-03-3.
- Sołkiewicz, Henryk, ed. (2018). Ewolucyjny rozwój sił okrętowych Marynarki Wojennej w latach 1945–2010 [Evolutionary Development of the Polish Navy's Naval Forces 1945–2010] (in Polish). Gdynia; Warsaw: Akademia Marynarki Wojennej. ISBN 978-83-65409-84-3.
- Volkov, Roman; Brichevsky, Andrew. "Small submarines – Project 96". RussianShips.info.
