= ORP Mazur (1954) =

Polish Cold War submarine

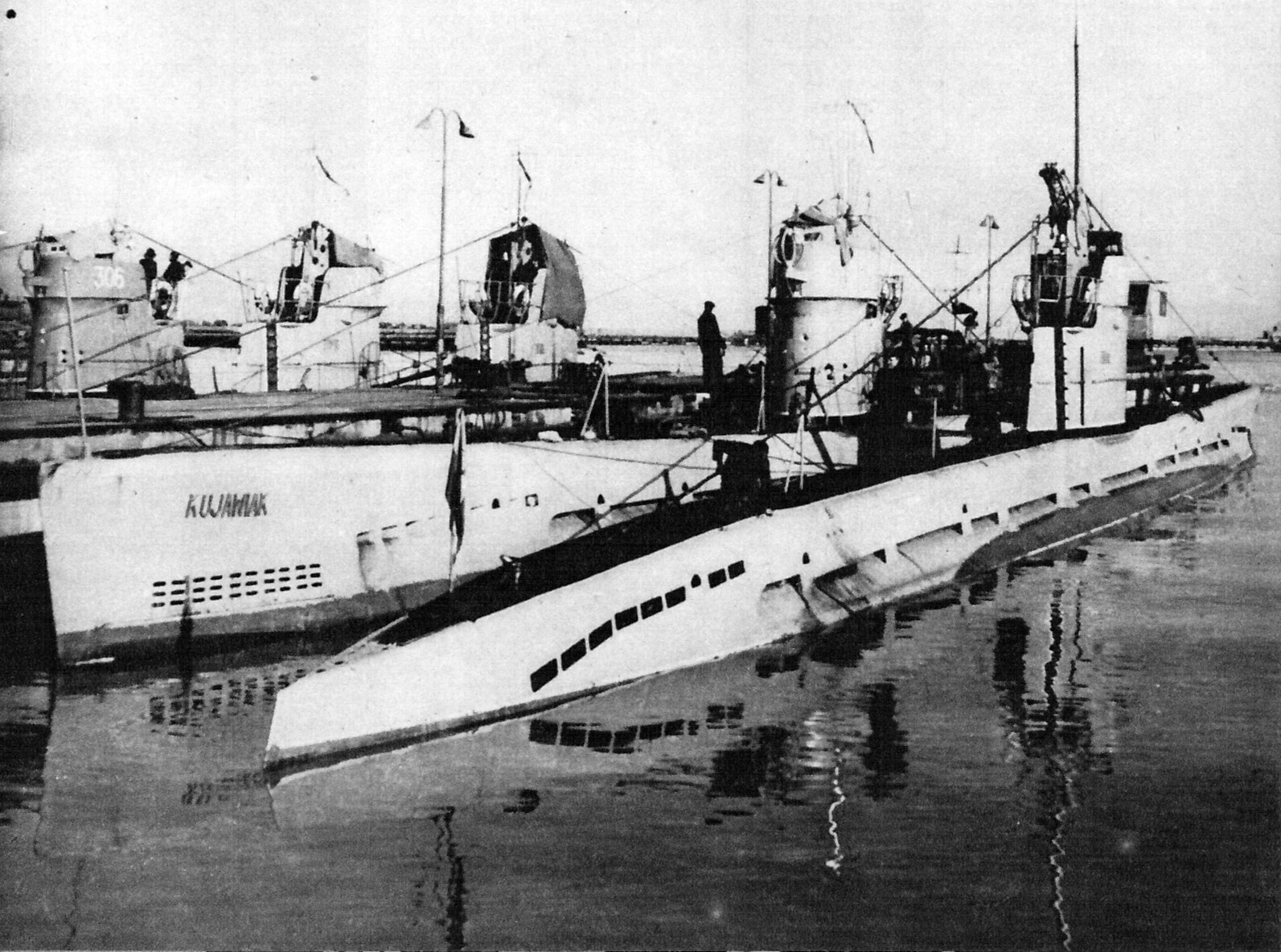
- Polish M-class submarines in port

History

Soviet Navy
- Name: M-236
- Builder: Krasnoye Sormovo Factory No. 112, Gorky; Sudomekh Shipyard, Leningrad
- Laid down: 19 February 1947
- Launched: 19 June 1948
- Commissioned: 19 October 1948
- Decommissioned: 30 April 1954

Poland
- Name: ORP Mazur
- Commissioned: 25 September 1954
- Decommissioned: 15 March 1965
- Fate: Scrapped

General characteristics
- Class & type: M-XV submarine
- Displacement: surfaced: 283 t (279 long tons); submerged: 353 t (347 long tons)
- Length: 49.5 m (162 ft 5 in)
- Beam: 4.4 m (14 ft 5 in)
- Draft: 2.6–2.8 m (8 ft 6 in – 9 ft 2 in)
- Propulsion: 2 diesel engines, 441 kW (591 hp) each; 2 electric motors, 160 kW (210 hp) each; 2 propellers
- Speed: surfaced: 15.7 kn (29.1 km/h; 18.1 mph); submerged: 7.8 kn (14.4 km/h; 9.0 mph)
- Range: surfaced: 4,500 nmi (8,300 km; 5,200 mi) at 8 kn (15 km/h; 9.2 mph); submerged: 85 nmi (157 km; 98 mi) at 2.9 kn (5.4 km/h; 3.3 mph)
- Complement: 31
- Armament: 1 universal gun, 45 mm (1.8 in) caliber; 4 torpedoes; torpedo tubes: 4 × 533 mm (21.0 in)

ORP Mazur was a Polish Cold War-era submarine, originally the Soviet M-236, one of six M-XV-series (Project 96) vessels of the M type acquired by Poland. It displaced 283 tonnes (279 long tons) surfaced and 353 t (347 long tons) submerged, with its primary armament consisting of four 533-millimetre (21.0 in) torpedoes launched from four internal torpedo tubes. The submarine achieved a surface speed exceeding 15 knots (28 km/h; 17 mph), with a range of 4,500 nautical miles (8,300 km; 5,200 mi) at 8 knots (15 km/h; 9.2 mph).

Launched on 19 June 1948 at Krasnoye Sormovo Factory No. 112 in Gorky and completed at the Sudomekh Shipyard in Leningrad, it entered service with the Soviet Navy on 19 October 1948, assigned to the Baltic Fleet. In 1954, Poland leased the vessel, commissioning it into the Polish Navy on 25 September 1954. Designated with pennant numbers M-101, P-101, and later 302, it served extensively until decommissioned on 15 March 1965 and was subsequently scrapped.

== Design and construction ==
Side profile of Project 96 (M-XV series) submarines

In the 1930s, the Soviet Union began serial production of small M-type submarines – VI, VIbis, and XII series – constructing 96 units (30 VI, 20 VIbis, 46 XII). By the late 1930s, with plans to expand the Soviet Navy, work started on a new small submarine design based on the XII series. On 13 August 1938, the tactical-technical specifications for these enlarged submarines were approved. That month, chief engineer F.F. Polushkin of the Rubin Design Bureau design bureau developed two preliminary designs, M-VI and M-VII, with M-VII selected for further development. This design featured a one-and-a-half-hull structure, four torpedo tubes, a twin-shaft propulsion system with increased power, and greater range and test depth. External saddle ballast tanks were detachable for railway transport.

On 23 July 1939, the M-VII design was approved by the Soviet Navy, and the Rubin Design Bureau finalized the working documentation as Project 96 (M-XV series), ratified on 8 February 1940. On 31 March 1940, keels for the first two Project 96 units – M-200 and M-201 – were laid at the Sudomekh Shipyard in Leningrad. During World War II, 15 M-XV series submarines were under construction at Sudomekh and the Krasnoye Sormovo Factory No. 112 in Gorky, but only four were completed by the war's end; by 1953, 57 units were built, largely to the same specifications (aside from equipment updates).

Construction of M-236 began at Krasnoye Sormovo Factory No. 112 in Gorky and was completed at Sudomekh Shipyard in Leningrad (construction number 355). Its keel was laid on 19 February 1947, and it was launched on 19 June 1948. M-274 was built at Sudomekh Shipyard (construction number 504); its keel was laid on 29 April 1950, and it was launched on 18 September of the same year. M-290 was also built at Sudomekh Shipyard (construction number 628); the keel was laid on 10 November 1951, and the vessel was launched on 27 May 1952.

== Technical specifications ==
=== General characteristics ===
ORP Mazur was a small, one-and-a-half-hull submarine designed for coastal operations, adapted to Baltic Sea wave conditions. Its steel hull was fully welded and divided by five watertight bulkheads into six compartments, from bow to stern: I – torpedo room (with sleeping berths), II – crew quarters (orlop deck), III – command center, IV – crew quarters, V – diesel engine room, and VI – electric motor room. The sail sat above the command center, with rechargeable batteries beneath the crew quarters. External saddle ballast tanks spanned both port and starboard from mid-compartment I to mid-compartment V, with an internal stern ballast tank; a submarine hull and quick-dive tank were under compartment III. Bow rudders were at the torpedo room level, with stern rudders and a single directional rudder aft of the propellers.

The length overall was 49.5 metres, beam 4.4 metres, and draft ranged from 2.6 metres at the bow to 2.8 metres at the stern. Displacement was 283 tons surfaced and 353 tons submerged. Test depth was 80 metres, with an operational depth of 60 metres. Maximum submerged endurance was 48 hours. Endurance was 14 days.

The crew comprised 6 officers, 15 petty officers, and 10 sailors (31 total).

=== Propulsion ===
Surfaced propulsion came from two 11D diesel engines, each producing 441 kW (600 hp), with exhausts routed through the conning tower. Submerged propulsion relied on two PG-17 electric motors, each delivering 160 kW (218 hp). Twin propeller shafts drove two propellers, achieving maximum speeds of 15.7 knots surfaced and 7.8 knots submerged (economic speeds were 10 and 3 knots, respectively). Range was 4500 nautical miles at 8 knots surfaced and 85 nautical miles at 2.9 knots submerged (or 965 nautical miles surfaced and 9.7 nautical miles submerged at maximum speeds). Fuel capacity was 28 tons. Electric power was stored in two 2-MS lead-acid batteries, each with 60 cells.

=== Armament and equipment ===
The submarine mounted four fixed bow torpedo tubes of 533 mm, carrying four torpedoes. It used steam-gas torpedoes, type 53-38, 7.19 metres long, weighing 1,615 kg (including a 300 kg explosive warhead) with a contact fuze. Torpedo range was 4,000 metres at 44.5 knots or 8,000 metres at 34.5 knots. Guidance was via gyroscope, with depths from 0 to 14 metres. Torpedoes could be fired from 30 metres depth and were loaded at base via crane, submerging the stern and raising the bow with ballast tanks.

Artillery armament initially included a single 45 mm anti-aircraft gun forward of the conning tower, with 200 rounds. Weighing 867 kg, it had an elevation range of -10° to +85°, with a horizontal range of 11,000 metres and vertical range of 7,000 metres. It fired 2.389 kg cartridges (1.43 kg projectile, 0.384 kg propellant, 0.575 kg cartridge case), including fragmentation-tracer, fragmentation, incendiary, armor-piercing-tracer, and cast iron blanks, at 30–40 rounds per minute.

Some sources suggest it could carry AMD-500 bottom naval mines instead of torpedoes, but as these were aviation mines, Polish M-XV submarines did not use them. However, some sources claim it also carried two 7.62 mm machine guns.

Radio-electronic equipment included an R-641 radio station with a mast for periscope depth communication (5 metres), a Mars-16K passive sonar with a 30-cable range, and a radio direction finder with an antenna on the conning tower. A PZ-7 periscope served as the optical detection tool. Rescue equipment included an emergency buoy with a wired telephone, radio signal transmitter, and signal light, plus "RUKTY" devices for absorbing carbon dioxide and releasing oxygen.

== Service history ==
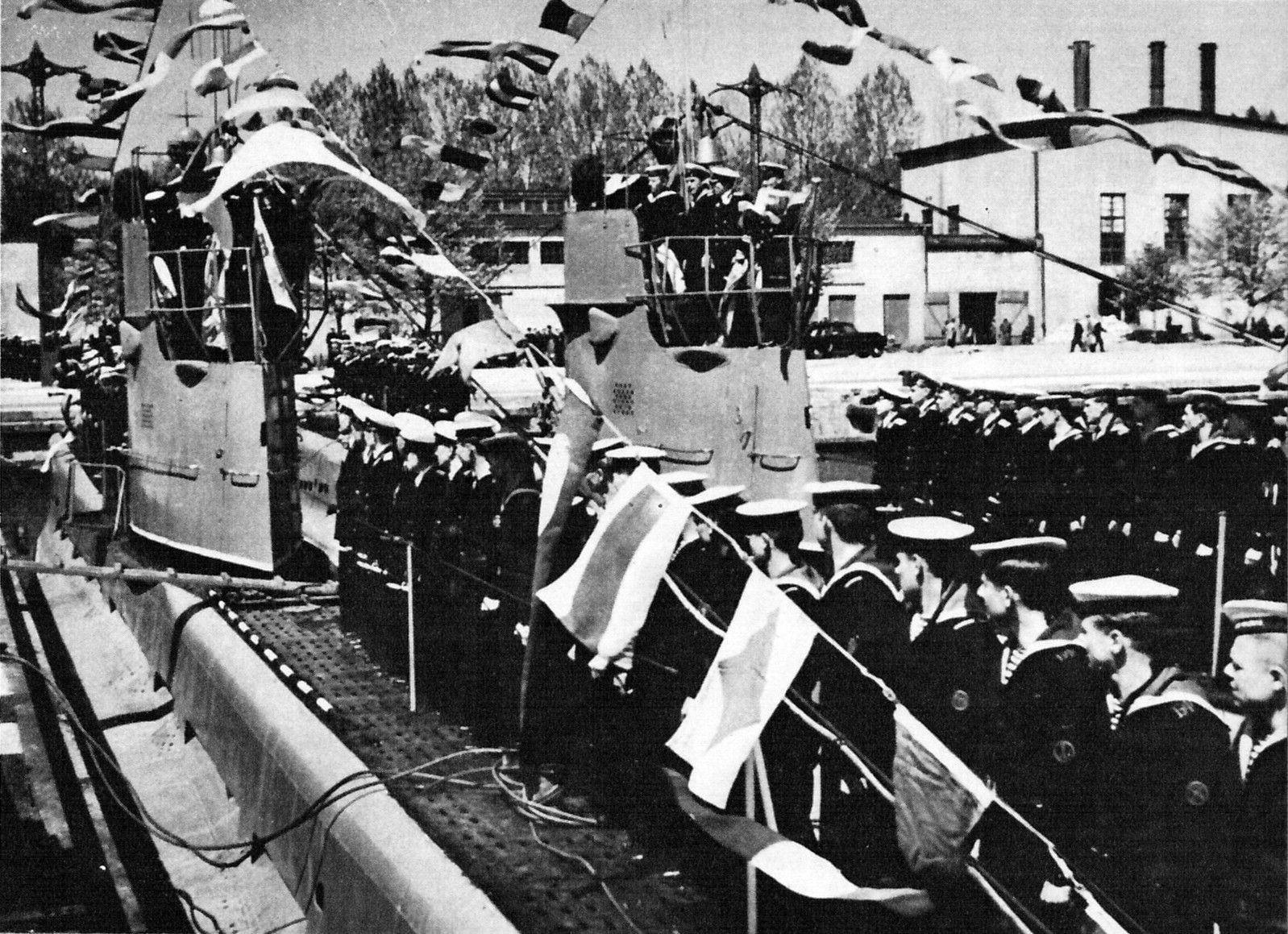
Poland taking over M-class submarines in 1954 or 1955

M-236 was commissioned into the Soviet Navy on 19 October 1948 and assigned to the Baltic Fleet. In 1953, due to the deteriorating condition of ORP Ryś and ORP Żbik in Poland's Submarine Squadron, negotiations with the Soviet Union began to lease submarines and submarine chasers. In 1954, the Soviet Union agreed to lease four Project 96 submarines, followed by two more in 1955, plus four Project 122bis submarine chasers. The submarines' lease term was eight years, costing 93,000 rubles annually per unit.

On 25 September 1954, the second leased submarine, named ORP Mazur, was officially commissioned into the Polish Navy, confirmed by Navy Commander's Order No. 047/Org. of 30 September. Its first Polish commander was Lieutenant Edward Jóźwiak. With pennant number M-101, it joined the Submarine Squadron alongside ORP Sęp, ORP Ryś, ORP Żbik, and ORP Kaszub. Soviet sailors remained aboard initially to train the Polish crew. Due to poor condition and lack of technical documentation, it soon underwent a months-long shipyard overhaul. On 16 September 1955, it was reassigned to the 1st Submarine Brigade, replacing the disbanded Submarine Squadron.

In 1956, the 1st Brigade's tasks included preparing submarines for coastal operations with air support, training for group torpedo attacks, reconnaissance, base blockades, evading anti-submarine warfare (ASW), and breaching ASW defenses. The 1957 training focused on day/night operations, reconnaissance, base blockades, torpedo firing, disrupting enemy communications, patrol duties, and landing small sabotage teams. That year, six 1st Brigade submarines (ORP Mazur, ORP Kaszub, ORP Krakowiak, ORP Kujawiak, ORP Ślązak, ORP Sęp) joined the Reda '57 fleet exercises. In early March, Mazur, Krakowiak, and Kurp carried out a training cruise with visits to Szczecin and Świnoujście. In summer 1957, the 45 mm deck gun was removed. On 15 December 1957, its pennant number changed to P-101. By the end of 1957, ORP Mazur was named the leading submarine of the Polish Navy.

In subsequent years, all Polish Project 96 submarines conducted intensive training cruises, regular torpedo drills, and simulated operations on enemy lines, base blockades, reconnaissance, and coordination with surface ships and aircraft. On 1 January 1960, its pennant number became 302. That year, due to deteriorating hull conditions, the Navy restricted Project 96 submarines to a 40-metre maximum depth and 60-metre seabed operations. In summer 1960, ORP Mazur, ORP Krakowiak, ORP Kurp, and ORP Ślązak joined Warsaw Pact "Bałtyk" maneuvers. In 1961, ORP Mazur, ORP Kurp, and ORP Ślązak participated in another "Bałtyk" exercise.

In 1962, Poland purchased the leased submarines from the Soviet Unionfor 400,000 PLN each. From April to July 1962, ORP Mazur underwent a hull inspection and maintenance in Gdańsk shipyard Remontowa's dry dock. That fall, the Navy's Technical Committee recommended decommissioning all Project 96 units due to unassessable hull conditions from missing Soviet documentation, limiting depth to 20 metres. In mid-1963, Mazur and Krakowiak were relegated to second-line service.

ORP Mazur was decommissioned on 15 March 1965, and officially removed from the naval register on 31 March by Navy Commander's Order No. 019/Org. dated 13 March. The crew disbanded under Order No. 058/Org. of 9 September. Although it was initially intended to convert the vessel into a museum ship, it was ultimately scrapped.

== Bibliography ==
- Rochowicz, Robert (2017). "Malutkie pod polską banderą" [Little Ones Under the Polish Flag]. Morze (in Polish). 4 (19). ZBiAM. ISSN 2543-5469.
- Sołkiewicz, Henryk, ed. (2018). Ewolucyjny rozwój sił okrętowych Marynarki Wojennej w latach 1945–2010 [Evolutionary Development of the Polish Navy's Naval Forces 1945–2010] (in Polish). Gdynia; Warsaw: Akademia Marynarki Wojennej. ISBN 978-83-65409-84-3.
