= ORP Krakowiak =

Three ships of the Polish Navy have borne the name ORP Krakowiak:

- ORP Krakowiak (1921), was a torpedo boat
- ORP Krakowiak (L115), was a Hunt-class destroyer launched as HMS Silverton for the Royal Navy and transferred in 1941. She was returned in 1946.
- ORP Krakowiak (1954), was a Soviet M-class submarine launched as M-279 in 1951 for the Soviet Navy and transferred in 1954
