= Cable length =

Unit of length

cable length
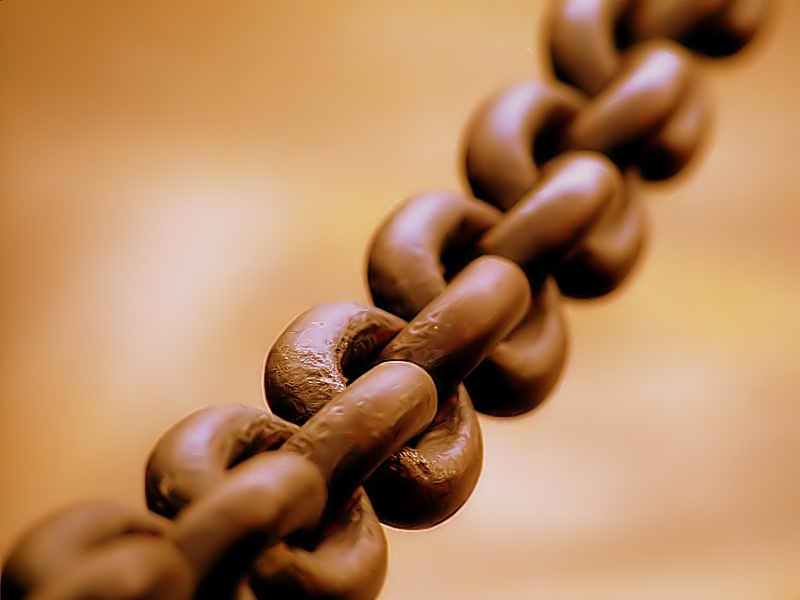
- A chain cable. A cable length is based on the historic length of a ship's cable.

General information
- Unit system: Imperial/US units
- Unit of: Length

Conversions
1 cable length in ...	... is equal to ...
- Imperial/US units: 0.1 NM
- Metric (SI) units: 185.2 m

Conversions (imperial)
1 imp unit in ...	... is equal to ...
- Imperial/US units: 100 fathoms; 600 ft
- Metric (SI) units: 182.9 m

Conversions (US)
1 US unit in ...	... is equal to ...
- Imperial/US units: 120 fathoms; 720 ft
- Metric (SI) units: 219.5 m

A cable length or length of cable is a nautical unit of measure equal to one tenth of a nautical mile or approximately 100 fathoms. Owing to anachronisms and varying techniques of measurement, a cable length can be anywhere from 169 to 220 m (185 to 241 yd), depending on the standard used.

== Etymology and origin ==
The modern word cable is directly descended from the Middle English cable, cabel or kabel and also occurs in Middle Dutch and Middle German. Ultimately the word comes from Romanic, probably from a cattle halter. A cable in this usage cable is a thick rope or by transference a chain cable. The OED gives quotations from c. 1400 onwards. A cable's length (often "cable length" or just "cable") is simply the standard length in which cables came, which by 1555 had settled to around 100 fathoms (600 ft; 180 m) or 1/10 nautical mile (0.19 km; 0.12 mi).

Traditionally rope is made on long ropewalks, the length of which determines the maximum length of rope it is possible to make. As rope is "closed" (the final stage in manufacture) the length reduces, thus the ropewalk at Chatham Dockyard is 1/4 mi (0.40 km) long to produce standard 220 m (120-fathom) coils.

== Definition ==
The definition varies:

- International: 185.2 m, equivalent to 1/10 nautical mile
- UK traditional: 100 fathoms (600 ft; 180 m), though the Admiralty used 1/10 of a sea mile, 1 minute of latitude locally.
- US customary (US Navy): 120 fathoms (720 ft; 220 m)

In 2008 the Royal Navy in a handbook defined it as follows:

A cable equals one-tenth of a sea mile – 608 ft. The length of a ship's hempen anchor cable was formerly 101 fathoms. 100 fathoms = 1 cable 10 cables = 1 nautical mile (very nearly)

== Citations ==
- Fenna, Donald (2002), "cable, cable length, cable's length", A Dictionary of Weights, Measures, and Units, Oxford: Oxford University Press, p. 35, ISBN 0-19-860522-6, OCLC 62608533. Also "fathom", from the same work (pp. 88–89, retrieved 12 January 2017).
- Master Ropemakers Ltd (2023), "Showing you the ropes", Historic Dockyard Chatham Various subpages within the ropery section.
- "cable". Oxford English Dictionary (online ed.). Oxford University Press. doi:10.1093/OED/2955013352. (Subscription or participating institution membership required.)
- Royal Navy (2007), Navy Slang: Cable – Curry, Royal Navy, archived from the original on 2008-07-07.
