= ORP Kaszub (1954) =

Polish submarine

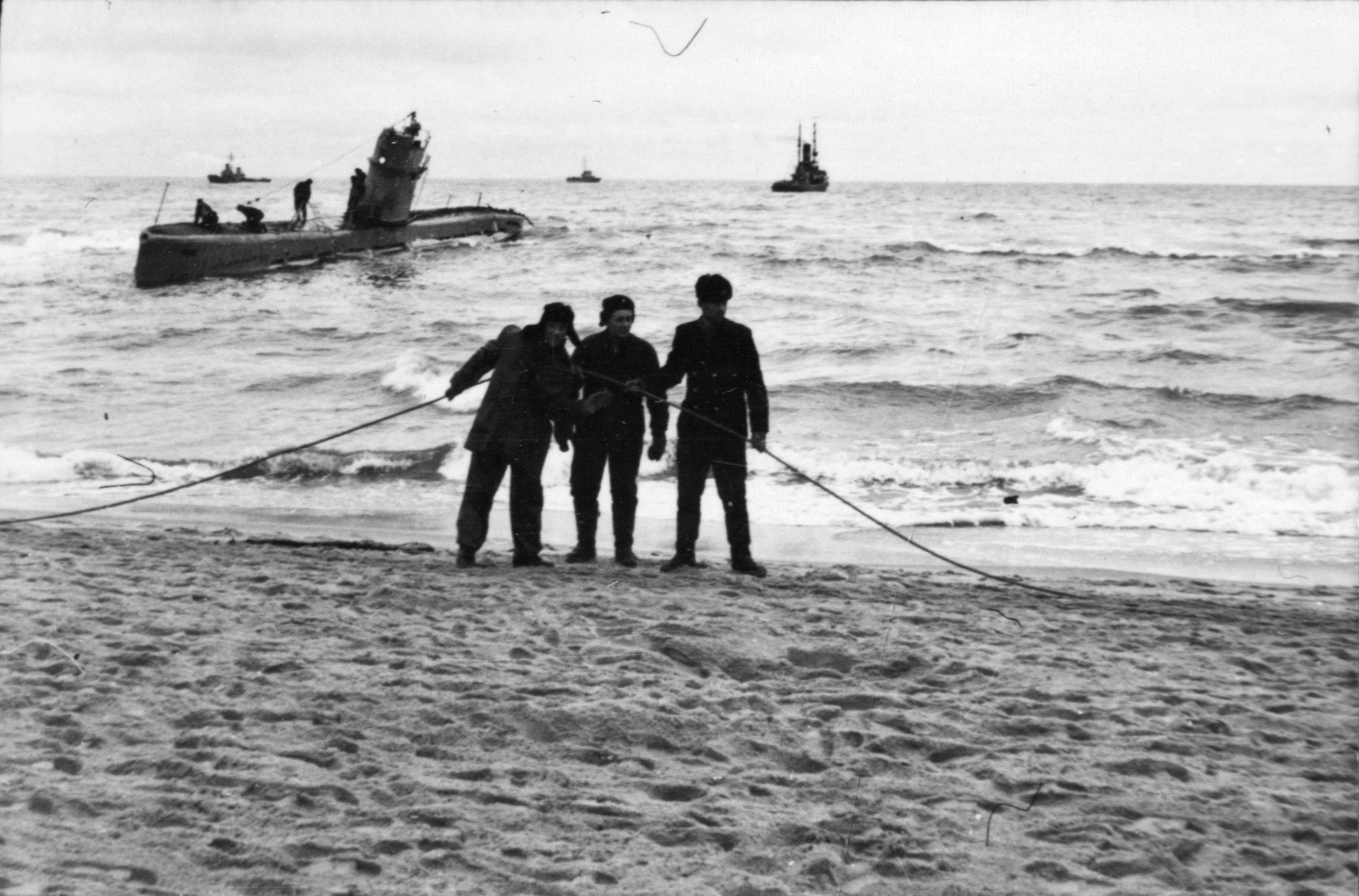
- Kaszub grounded on the shoal, 1957

History

Poland
- Name: Kaszub
- Operator: Polish Navy
- Builder: Sudomekh Shipyard, Leningrad, USSR
- Laid down: 10 November 1951
- Launched: 27 May 1952, as M-290
- Commissioned: 5 June 1954
- Decommissioned: December 1963
- Fate: Scrapped
- Official Numbers: M-100, P-100, and 306

General characteristics
- Class & type: M class submarine
- Displacement: 281 tons surfaced; 351 tons submerged
- Length: 50.0 m (164 ft 1 in)
- Beam: 4.9 m (16 ft 1 in)
- Draft: 3.6 m (11 ft 10 in)
- Speed: 15 knots (28 km/h) surfaced; 10 knots (19 km/h) submerged
- Complement: 32
- Armament: 4 × 533 mm (21 in) torpedo tubes (2 bow, 2 stern); 1 × 45 mm (2 in) semi-automatic gun

ORP Kaszub was a small submarine of Soviet M class (postwar series XV) which served in the Polish Navy from 1954 to 1963.

It was built in the Soviet Union in 1951-1952, and initially served in the Soviet Baltic Fleet as M-290. It was the first of six Soviet-made submarines to be transferred to the Polish Navy in the 1950s. The ceremony of raising the Polish flag on the submarine took place on June 5, 1954.

== History ==
=== Construction ===
Kaszub was built at Sudomekh Shipyard in Leningrad, in shipyard No. 196. It was laid down on November 10, 1951, and launched on May 27, 1952.

==== Identification ====
While flying under the Polish flag, it changed alphanumeric markings. It started service as the M-100 , then P-100 , and ended service with number 306.

=== 1957 grounding incident ===
The most notable event in the submarine's history was the grounding near Krynica Morska on November 28, 1957. The commander of the ship made an unsuccessful attempt to get off the shoal, regardless of the extremely difficult conditions (strong wind, high waves, and low temperature). During the operation, two crew members lost their lives, and the ship was forced by the sea onto the beach. The submarine remained there until a rescue operation conducted by several units allowed Kaszub to be pulled into deeper water. Following this, the submarine was repaired and returned to service.

=== End of service and fate ===
Kaszub was decommissioned from the Navy in December 1963 and scrapped shortly thereafter.
