= Contact fuze =

Device that detonates bomb on contact with hard surface

A contact fuze, impact fuze, percussion fuze or direct-action (D.A.) fuze (UK) is the fuze that is placed in the nose of a bomb or shell so that it will detonate on contact with a hard surface.

Many impacts are unpredictable: they may involve a soft surface, or an off-axis grazing impact. The pure contact fuze is often unreliable in such cases and so a more sensitive graze fuze or inertia fuze is used instead. The two types are often combined in the same mechanism.

== Artillery fuzes ==
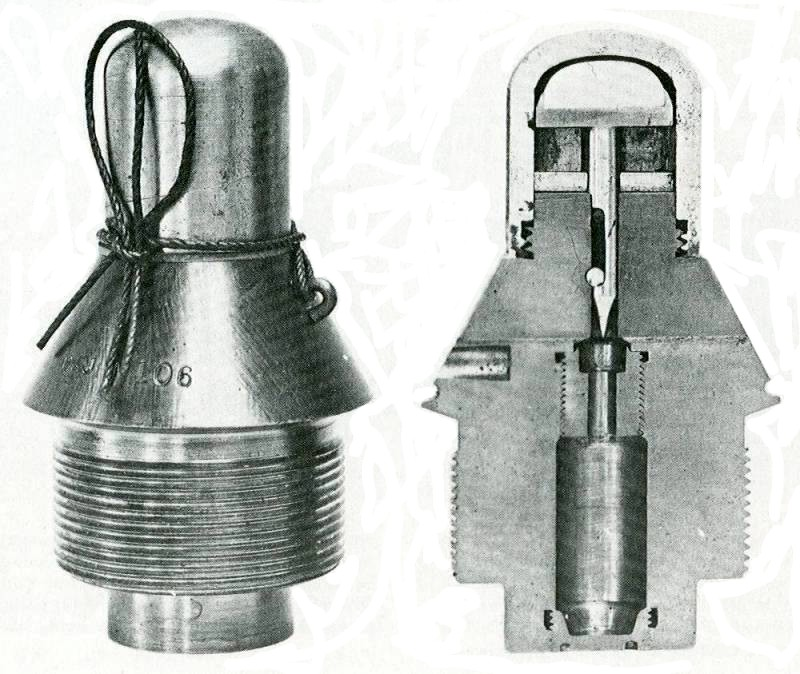
No. 106 fuze

The British Army's first useful impact fuze for high-explosive shells was the Fuze No. 106 of World War I. (illus.) This used a simple protruding plunger or striker at the nose, which was pushed back to drive a firing pin into the detonator. Its ability to burst immediately at ground level was used to clear the barbed wire entanglements of no man's land, rather than burying itself first and leaving a deep, but useless, crater. The striker was protected by a safety cap that was removed before loading, but there was no other safety mechanism.

The simplest form of artillery contact fuze is a soft metal nose to the shell, filled with a fulminating explosive such as lead azide. An example is the British World War II Fuze, Percussion, D.A., No. 233 ('direct action') The primary explosive transmits its detonation to an explosive booster within the fuze, then in turn to the main charge of the shell. As an artillery shell lands with a considerable impact, the "soft" nose may be made robust enough to be adequately safe for careful handling, without requiring any protection cap or safety mechanism. As a matter of normal practice though, fuzes and shells are transported separately and the fuze is only installed shortly prior to use. These simple contact fuzes are generally used for anti-tank shells, rather than high-explosive.

A more sophisticated fuze is the double-acting fuze, which is sensitive to both contact and grazing. (Note: In British terminology, "D.A." stands for "direct action", i.e. contact, rather than double-acting. Many D.A. fuzes, such as the No. 233, are not double-acting.) An example of such a double-acting fuze is the British WW II Fuze, D.A. and percussion, No. 119 This fuze uses a nose striker, as for the original No. 106, but is rather more complex with an added inertia mechanism for grazing impacts and also three automatic safety devices. Simple contact impacts drive the striker back into the detonating pellet, as before. Graze impacts trigger the inertia mechanism, where instead the pellet in a heavy carrying plug travels forwards onto the striker. The striker is protected in storage by a nose safety cap. Normally this is removed before loading, but it may also be left in place if the target is behind cover. This reduces the sensitivity of the striker to light impacts through vegetation, but the fuze will still function through the inertia mechanism, or through a hard impact. Three safety devices are provided, one released by inertia during firing, which then unlocks a second that is released by centrifugal force of the spinning shell. These are mechanical locks that prevent the striker contacting the pellet. A third device is a centrifugal shutter that initially blocks propagation from the detonator pellet to the booster explosive.

Most artillery contact fuzes act immediately, although some may have a delay. This allows a high-explosive or semi-armour-piercing shell to penetrate a wall before exploding, thus achieving the most damage inside the building. Where a shell is used against strong armour and requires all of its explosive power merely to penetrate, a delay is not appropriate. Most such delayed fuzes are thus switchable to a "superquick" or immediate mode.

Timed fuzes are used for airbursts. They take their delay time (½ second or longer) from firing, not from impact. These fuzes may also offer a contact fuzed ability. As this type of fuze is complex and more sensitive, they usually have a deliberate safing mechanism such as an arming wire that must be removed before use.

== Air-dropped bomb fuzes ==
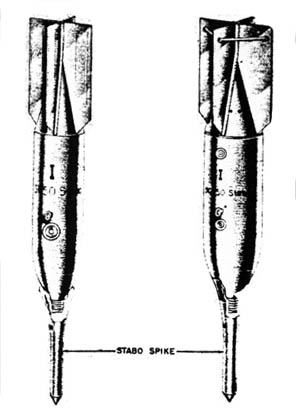
Stabo

Fuzes for air-dropped bombs have generally used an internally mounted inertia fuze, triggered by the sudden deceleration on impact. Owing to the risk of an aircraft crash, or even the need to land with an undropped bomb still on board, these are protected by sophisticated safety systems so that the fuze can only be triggered after it has been dropped intentionally.

Stabo

The German Stachelbombe (nose-spike bomb) or stabo of WWII was a standard bomb, from 50 kg to 500 kg, modified for use from low altitude. To avoid the risk of ricochet from the ground, a nose spike was fitted to penetrate first and anchor the bomb against bouncing — without this, there was a risk of the dropping aircraft not only missing the target, but also being damaged by its own weapon. As the German electric fuzes had an arming delay after dropping, and the bombs were dropped at such low altitude as to leave insufficient time for this to arm, they were also sometimes fitted with additional contact fuzes on the tips of these nose spikes.

Similar devices were employed by Soviet forces, in a similar ground attack role using the Il-2 Sturmovik.

Fat Man

Notable examples of air-dropped bombs that did use contact fuzes include the Fat Man atomic bomb dropped on Nagasaki. The bomb was intended for air burst detonation and was fitted with both radar height-finding and barometric fuzes. As the device was so secret, and the risk of informative fragments or plutonium being recovered after a failed drop was considered to be unacceptable, it was fitted with supplementary contact fuzes that were only intended to destroy the weapon beyond recognition. Four AN-219 piezo-electric impact fuzes were fitted to the nose of the bomb casing.

BLU-82

The BLU-82 was a large conventional explosive bomb, used to make helicopter landing clearings in forests. The intended fusing was an extremely low air burst of only a few feet, so as to maximize the clearance effect and minimize cratering. The fuze was a mechanical impact fuze on a 38-inch (97 cm) nose spike.

Other fuzes

The contact fuze is set off when a series of connected crush switches that are placed on the exterior nose of the ordnance device make contact with the ground. The contact with solid ground activates the interior firing circuits which leads to the detonation of the ordnance device. A cone shaped cover over the device prevents premature detonation while the device is being loaded and carried to the desired location by aircraft.

== See also ==
- Artillery fuze
- Fuze
- Proximity fuze
