= Krasnoye Sormovo Factory No. 112 =

Shipbuilder in Nizhny Novgorod, Russia

Coordinates: 56°22′N 43°52′E

Krasnoye Sormovo

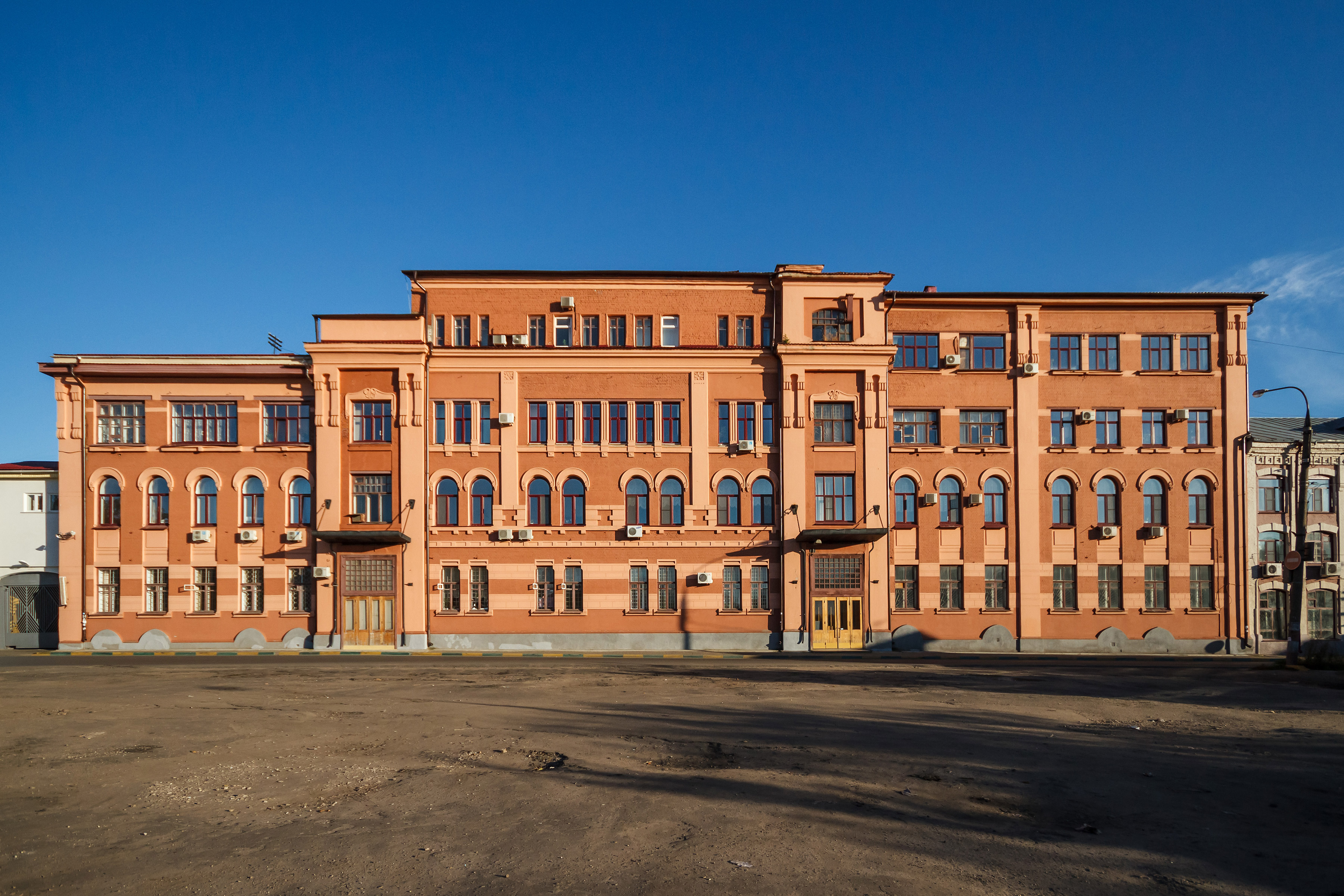
- Main entrance
- Native name: Красное Сормово
- Company type: PJSC
- Industry: Shipbuilding
- Founded: 1849 Nizhny Novgorod
- Headquarters: Nizhny Novgorod, NIZ, Russia
- Products: Submarines, hydrofoils, tugboats, tankers
- Revenue: $3.4 billion (2014)
- Net income: $150 million (2014)
- Owner: Mikhail Pershin
- Parent: United Shipbuilding Corporation
- Website: krsormovo.nnov.ru

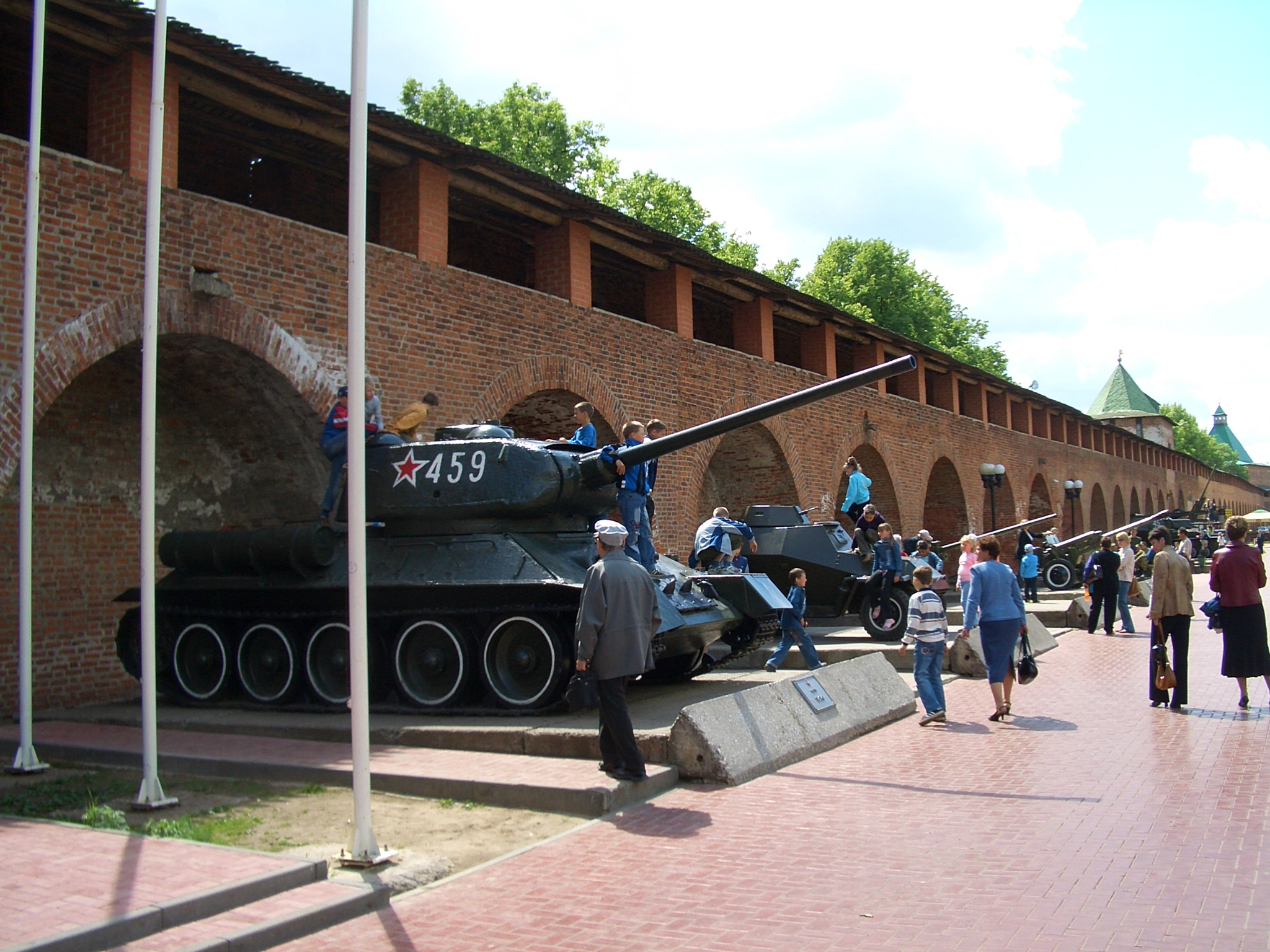
A sampling of wartime products of Krasnoye Sormovo and other Nizhny Novgorod plants is on display in Nizhny Novgorod Kremlin

Krasnoye Sormovo Shipyard No. 112 named after Andrei Zhdanov (Russian: Судостроительное предприятие "Кра́сное Со́рмово" имени А. А. Жданова) is one of the oldest shipbuilding factories in Russia, located in the Sormovsky City District of Nizhny Novgorod (formerly called Gorky).

== Early history ==
The shipyard was established in 1849 by companies Nizhny Novgorod Machine Factory (Нижегородская машинная фабрика) and Volga Steam Navigation (Волжское пароходство). It was originally called the Nizhny Novgorod Machine Factory. In 1851, the factory began the construction of solid metal steamers. Three years later, it developed the production of screw schooners. In 1858, the Nizhny Novgorod Machine Factory produced the first Russian steam dredger. In 1870, the first Russian open hearth furnace was built at the yard, followed by a two-decked steamship Perevorot just a year later. In 1913, it produced a dry bulk cargo ship Danilikha. The factory built 489 ships between 1849 and 1918. It also produced steam engines, carriages, steam locomotives, tramcars, bridges, diesel engines, cannons, pontoons, and projectiles.

== Steam locomotive builder ==
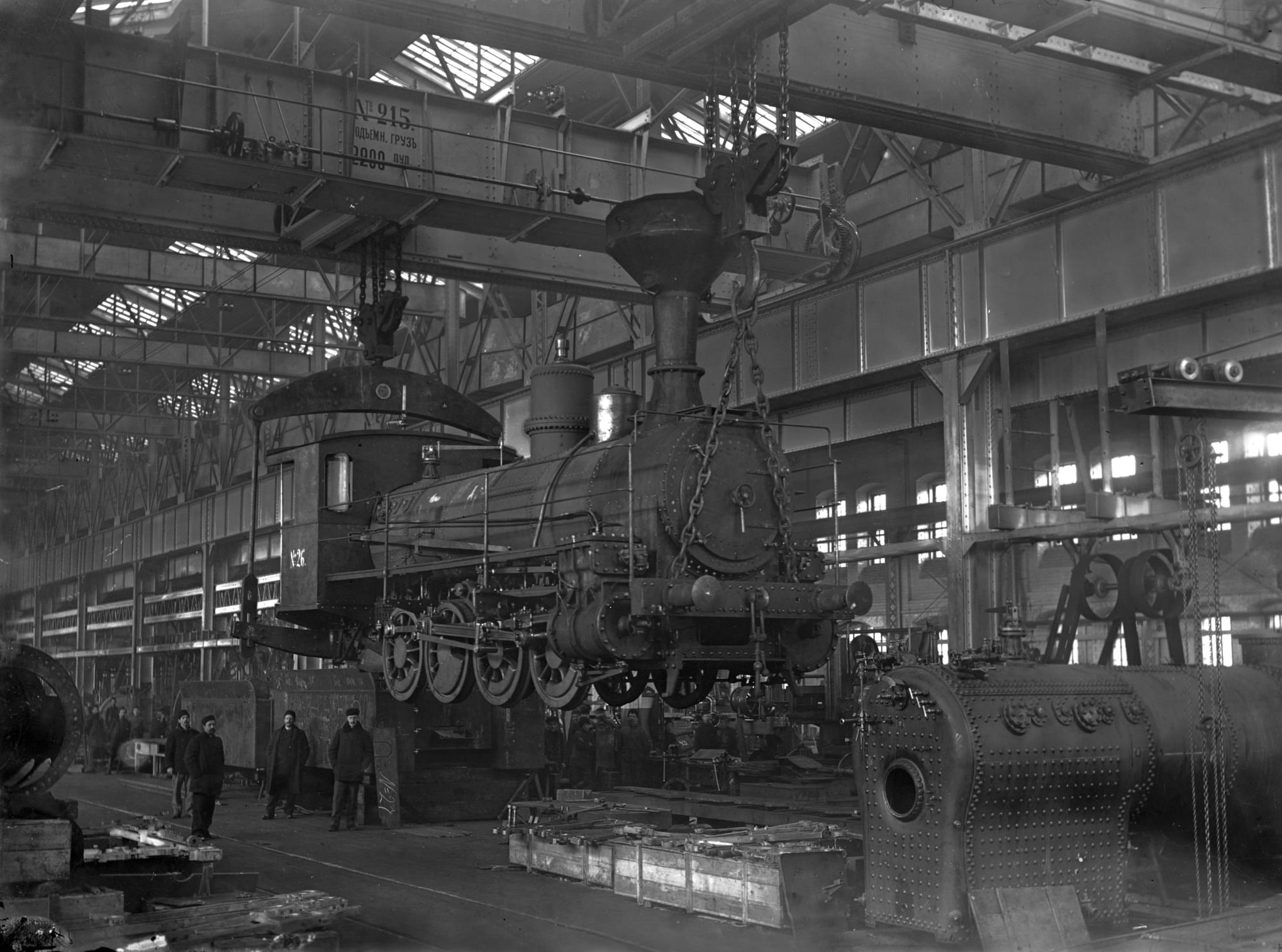
O^{d} steam loco at Sormovo Factory

Since 1898, one of the chief products of Sormovo Works was steam locomotives, although the plant continued building river paddle steamers for Volga service and, on a lesser scale, other industrial products. Lists of the factory's products from that period are preserved in magazines also found in collections both in Russia and elsewhere. Sormovo Work advertised in many industrial magazines, the last ads having been printed as late as 1916. The factory had close connections with Krauss Lokomotive Works in Munich, Germany until the outbreak of the First World War in 1914. Krauss sold its first 1,524 mm (5 ft) gauge steam locomotive to Eisenwerke Sormovo in 1884. Named W.Schlüter Krauss factory type 60 an 0-4-0T (Bt-n2) under its works number 1178 / 1884. The second locomotive followed in 1885, a 900 mm (2 ft 11 7/16 in) gauge 0-4-0T (Bt-n2) to Sormovo's internal industrial railway with Krauss works number 1668 / 1885.

During 1898–1917, Sormovo Works built 2164 steam locomotives. During 1918–1935, another 1111 standard Russian 1,524 mm gauge steam locomotives were built there. Then followed the two-year period when Sormovo built 200 750 mm (2 ft 5 1/2 in) gauge 0-8-0 (D-h2) Kolomna Locomotive Works factory type 157 steam locomotives, after which the factory switched to making submarine diesel motors. After the German-Soviet War of 1941-45, the steam locomotive production resumed; this time on the production line was the fourth and last version of standard Soviet passenger type Su 2-6-2 (1C1-h2) steam locomotives. Overall, 411 steam locomotives were built in 1947–1951.

The total steam locomotive production during 1898–1951 was 3886 steam locomotives. (Rakov 1995)

== Military production ==
During the Russian Civil War of 1918-1920, the Nizhny Novgorod Machine Factory built armored trains, armored carriages, and weapons for the vessels of the Volga Military Flotilla. In 1920, the factory remanufactured fourteen burnt-out French Renault FT tanks for the Red Army, the Russkiy Renos, and assembled a single new copy, named 'Freedom Fighter Lenin'. In 1922, the factory changed its name by appending the adjective Krasnoye (Red) to it. During the German-Soviet War of 1941-1945, the Krasnoye Sormovo Factory produced T-34 medium tanks. The turret for the upgunned T-34-85 was designed here by V. Kerichev in 1943.

== After the war: shipbuilding ==
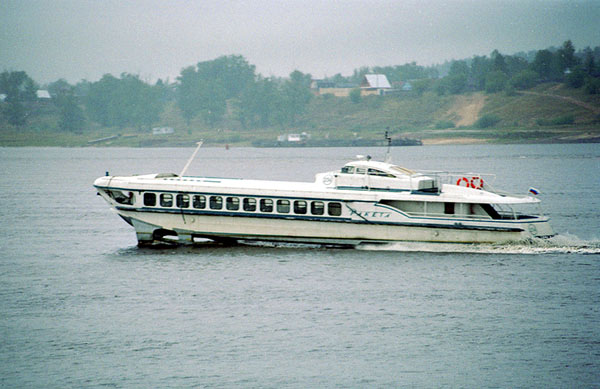
A Raketa hydrofoil on the Volga

After the war, the factory switched to the sectional and large-block construction of ships, sea and river tankers, suction dredgers, and dredgers. They developed an automated process of pouring and cutting slabs with the use of radioisotope technology, produced the first Soviet hydrofoils (Raketa), designed. They also built passenger diesel-electric ships Lenin and Soviet Union for the Volga River Navigation company, the first high-speed passenger hovercraft Sormovich, a few diesel-electric railroad ferries for the Baku-Krasnovodsk route, and a unique 250-tonne double-hulled floating crane Kyor-Ogly. Currently, this company is in charge of a cruise ship named after Mustai Karim, a Bashkir Soviet poet, writer and playwright.

== Awards ==
The Krasnoye Sormovo Factory was awarded two Orders of Lenin (1943, 1949), Order of the October Revolution (1970), Order of the Patriotic War (1 Class, 1945), and Order of the Red Banner of Labour (1939). The factory is now a part of the United Shipbuilding Corporation.

== See also ==
- List of Russian steam locomotive classes
- Soviet tank factories

== Bibliography ==
- Zaloga, Steven J., James Grandsen (1984). Soviet Tanks and Combat Vehicles of World War Two. London: Arms and Armour Press. ISBN 0-85368-606-8.
- Vitali A. Rakov (Виталий Александрович Раков) (1995). "Lokomotivy otjetsjestvjennyh zheleznyh dorog 1845–1955". (Locomotives of our country's railways). Moscow: Transport. ISBN 5-277-00821-7.
