= Kronshtadt-class submarine chaser =

Soviet submarine chaser class

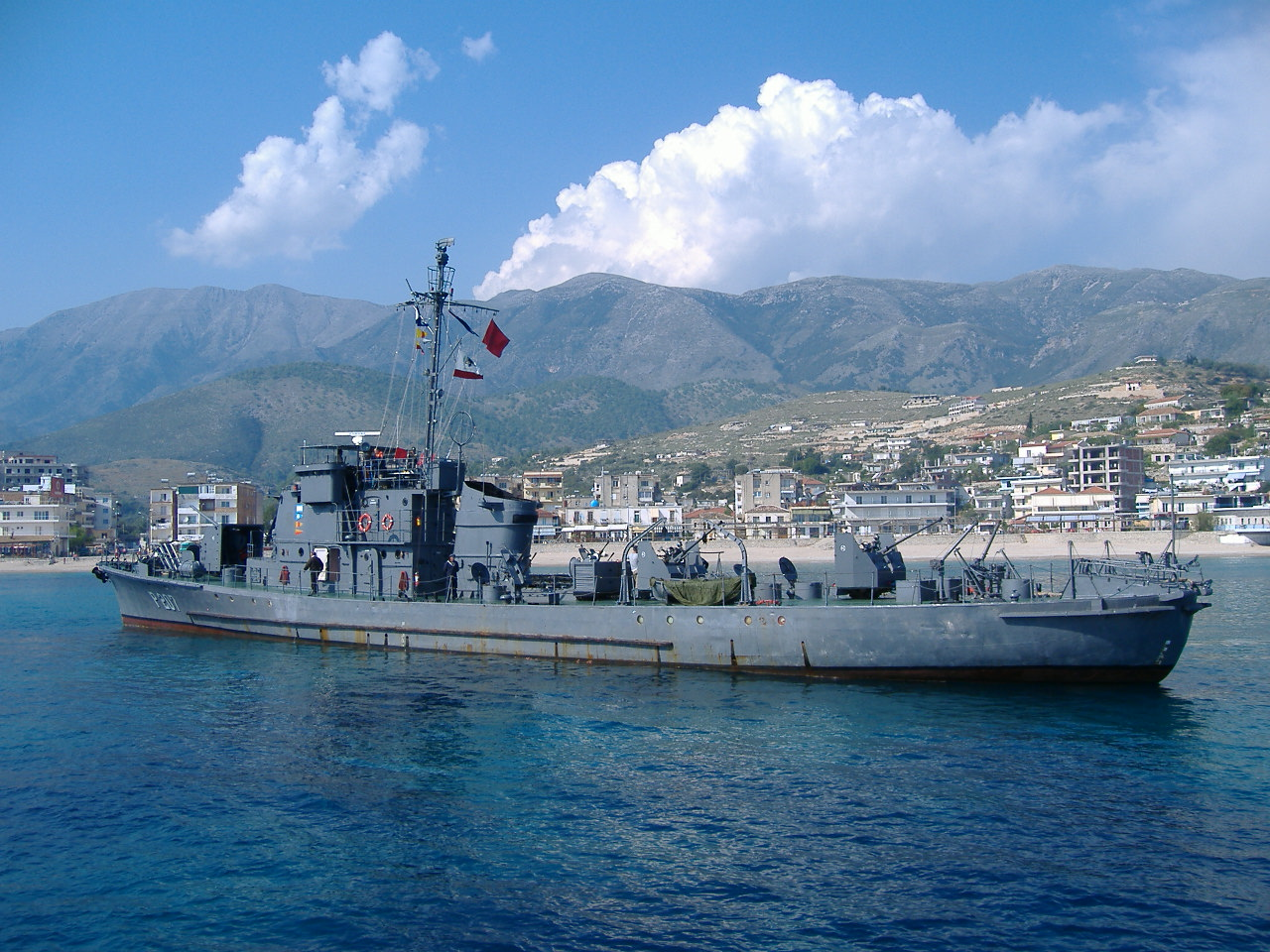
- A Project 122bis Kronshtadt-class chaser in the service of the Albanian Naval Force

Class overview
- Name: Kronshtadt class
- Builders: Zelenodolsk shipbuilding yard No. 340
- Operators: Soviet Navy; Albanian Naval Force; Bulgarian Navy; People's Liberation Army Navy; Cuban Revolutionary Navy; Indonesian Navy; Polish Navy; Romanian Naval Forces
- Preceded by: SO1-class submarine chaser
- Succeeded by: Poti-class corvette
- Built: 1945–1955
- Completed: 227

General characteristics
- Class & type: Large submarine chasers; since 1956 — Small anti-submarine ships
- Displacement: 289 (I series) / 302 (II series) ton standard, 325 (I series) / 337,7 tons full load
- Length: 52.24 m (171.4 ft)
- Beam: 6.55 m (21.5 ft)
- Draft: 2.2 m (7.2 ft)
- Propulsion: 3 diesel engines @ 3,600 hp (2,700 kW) "General Motors" (I series) / 3,300 hp (2,500 kW) "9D" (II series) with 3 shafts
- Speed: 20.5 knots (38.0 km/h) (I series) / 18.7 knots (34.6 km/h) (II series)
- Range: 4,800–6,500 km (2,600–3,500 nmi) at 22 km/h (12 kn)
- Complement: 50-54
- Sensors & processing systems: Radar: 1 "Giuys-1" or "Zarya" (I series) / "Lin`" or/and "Neptun" (II series) search radar; Sonar: 1 "Tamir-9" or "Tamir-10" or "Tamir-11" hull mounted high frequency active sonar
- Armament: 1 × 85 mm air defence gun M1939 (52-K); 2 × 37 mm automatic air defense gun M1939 (61-K) (2x1); 6 × "Colt-Browning" or 2M-1 12.7 mm heavy machine guns (2x3) (I series); 6 × 2M-7 14.5 mm (2x3) (last ships of II series); 2 depth charge rails (30 large & 30 small depth charges); 2 × BMB-1 or BMB-2 ASW mortars; 2 × RBU (II series) or 2 x RBU-1200 (last ships of II series) Anti Submarine Warfare rocket launchers; 16 Type 1908/39 mines (overload)
- Armor: 8 mm (conning tower)

Project 122bis (NATO codename Kronshtadt class) submarine chasers were a Soviet design which were exported throughout the communist bloc in the 1950s. The first ship, BO-270, was built at Zelenodolsk in 1945-1947 and a total of 227 were built for Soviet Navy (175) and border guard until 1955. As well as this, twenty Project 357 (Libau class) despatch vessels were built on the same hull, but were lightly armed.

== Service history ==
The ships served in 1950s–1960s on all Soviet fleets and flotillas in the Baltic Sea, Black Sea, Caspian Sea, Arctic Ocean and Pacific Ocean as part of Soviet coastal anti-submarine defences. Ships were also given to the Soviet Border Guards and were used actively as border patrol ships. Most of the Soviet sub-chasers were decommissioned between 1958 and 1970, although some were in service until the 1990s as training stations. Thirteen of the decommissioned and disarmed ships were delivered to the DOSAAF Voluntary Society for use as training ships.

== Ships ==
- Built in 1946 (launching year):
  - BO-270 (laid up 30.06.1945, launched 27.04.1946, commissioned 27.09.1947 on Caspian Flotilla)
  - BO-171...BO-173
- 1947:
  - BO-181...BO-187
- 1948:
  - BO-187...BO-195
- 1949:
  - BO-196...BO-201
  - BO-247...BO-255
  - BO-271...BO-276
- 1950:
  - BO-277...BO-300
  - BO-334...BO-338
- 1951:
  - BO-339...BO-354
  - BO-356...BO-379
- 1952:
  - BO-371...BO-402
- 1953:
  - BO-403...BO-437
- 1954:
  - BO-438...BO-440
  - BO-446...BO-453
  - PSKR-444...PSKR-451, PSKR-436, PSKR-437
  - BO-454...BO-469
- 1955:
  - BO-470...BO-480
  - BO-155
  - PSKR-424, PSKR-418, PSKR-407
  - BO-157
  - PSKR-408, PSKR-419, PSKR-425, PSKR-426
  - BO-159...BO-163

== Export and transferring ==
- Albania:
  - MPK-345 (1951), MPK-346 (1951) in 1958 (both returned in 1960),
  - MPK-388 (1952), MPK-389 (1952) in 1958,
  - MPK-394 (1952), MPK-450 (1954) in 1960.
- Bulgaria:
  - 94 (ex-MPK-160) (1955) and 95 (ex-MPK-162) (1955) in 1957.
- China:
  - BO-379 (1952), BO-380 (1952), BO-393 (1952), BO-395 (1952), BO-396 (1952), BO-397 (1952) in 1955.
  - In addition, 6 hulls were built at Zelenodolsk in 1954, transferred in parts by railway to Guangzhou (2) and Shanghai (4) and commissioned into the People's Liberation Army Navy, and were designated as the Type 6604 submarine chaser. China had made minor changes during the construction of these boats, the only significant difference between Type 6604 and the original Project 122bis being in the galley, which was modified to better fit Chinese usage. The original electric stove was replaced by an oil stove, so Chinese foods such as stir fry can be cooked more efficiently; the bread storage cabinet was modified to store rice instead. In addition, some empty areas were fenced up to store canned food.
  - Furthermore, 14 built in China with the assistance of Soviet specialists, with 12 completed at the end of 1956 and 2 in 1957. The first Chinese built unit entered service in 1957 and was designated as the Type 04 submarine chaser. During the deployment of Type 6604 in the South China Sea, it was discovered that the original design for arctic and subarctic use was woefully inadequate for tropical and subtropical regions, with temperatures onboard reaching 40+ degrees Celsius. The Type 04 design was modified to address this problem by adding insulation layers and a sprinkler system on the ammo storage boxes to prevent overheat, and canvas shades which can be removed in less than five minutes when needed. In addition nine more fans were added for better ventilation inside.
- Cuba:
  - MPK-462 (1954), MPK-464 (1954), MPK-465 (1954), MPK-479 (1955), MPK-155 (1955), MPK-159 (1955) in 1962.
- Indonesia:
  - MPK-424 (1953), MPK-426 (1953), MPK-427 (1953), MPK-429 (1953) in 1958,
  - MPK-292 (1950), MPK-293 (1950), MPK-294 (1950), MPK-300 (1950), MPK-334 (1950), MPK-382 (1952) in 1963. These six ships were reconstructed specially for Indonesian Navy by project "06" — with rearming by RBU-1200 rocket launchers and accommodating to tropical service conditions.
- Poland:
  - Czujny (ex-BO-411) (1953), Nieugięty (ex-BO-412) (1953), Zawzięty (ex-BO-417) (1953), Zwrotny (ex-BO-418) in 1955,
  - Zwinny (ex-MPK-291) (1950), Zręczny (ex-MPK-296) (1950), Wytrwały (ex-MPK-344) (1951), Groźny (ex-MPK-347) (1951) in 1957.
- Romania:
  - V1 (ex-BO-157) (1955), V2 (ex-BO-161) (1955) and V3 (ex-BO-466) (1954) in 1956.

== Chinese service history ==
Two boats of this class, #271 & #274 participated in the Sino-South Vietnamese naval battle in the Paracel Islands on January 19, 1974, with #274 being heavily damaged; however, #274 was able to make it back to the Chinese base at Yongxing Island for emergency repair after the battle, and returned to Hainan Islands the next day.

Despite their obsolescence, these boats remained active well into the mid-1990s. Although the ships are no longer capable of venturing into open ocean, these units remain on the People's Liberation Army Navy’s list of its reserve fleet, actively used as weaponry training boats for naval militia in various military maritime districts in China.

Additionally, vessels of this class in Chinese service are used to take Chinese children enrolled in military / naval summer camps and junior military / naval academies for short cruises for patriotic education and public relations missions. Due to the age of these units, however, they are increasingly being used in secondary missions in recent years and according to domestic Chinese media sources, even in this limited capacity, the cruises only consist of short tours within the harbors.

== See also ==
- List of ships of the Soviet Navy
- List of ships of Russia by project number
