= Sudomekh Shipyard =

1930s-1970s shipyard in Leningrad, USSR (present-day Saint Petersburg, Russia)

- Company type: Shipyard
- Industry: Shipbuilding
- Founded: 1930; 95 years ago in Leningrad, USSR
- Fate: Merged into the Admiralty Shipyard, 1970
- Products: Submarines

The Sudomekh Shipyard was created during the 1930s as a specialized submarine shipyard in Leningrad, USSR, probably from facilities of the adjacent Admiralty Shipyard. It was designated Factory No. 196 when the Soviets numbered all of their factories in 1936. The shipyard was damaged during World War II, but was repaired and became one of the main Soviet submarine production centers during the Cold War. It was merged into the Admiralty Shipyard in 1970.

== See also ==
- List of ships of Russia by project number
- List of Soviet and Russian submarine classes

== Bibliography ==
- Breyer, Siegfried (1992). Soviet Warship Development: Volume 1: 1917-1937. London: Conway Maritime Press. ISBN 0-85177-604-3.
- Harrison, Mark; Cooper, Julian; Dexter, Keith & Rodionov, Ivan (1999). The Numbered Factories and Other Establishments of the Soviet Defence Industry Complex, 1927 to 1968, Part I, Factories & Shipyards (Version 8 ed.). Warwick, UK: University of Warwick, Department of Economics.
- Polmar, Norman (1983). Guide to the Soviet Navy (3rd ed.). Annapolis, Maryland: Naval Institute Press. ISBN 0-87021-239-7.
- Polmar, Norman & Noot, Jurrien (1991). Submarines of the Russian and Soviet Navies, 1718–1990. Annapolis, Maryland: Naval Institute Press. ISBN 0-87021-570-1.
