= Soviet submarine M-200 =

- Scheme of serie XV

History

Soviet Union
- Name: М-200 Месть
- Builder: Sudomekh/plant 196
- Laid down: 31 March 1940
- Launched: 17 July 1941
- Commissioned: 20 March 1943
- Fate: Sank after collision on 21 November 1956

General characteristics
- Class & type: Malyutka class, Serie XV
- Displacement: 281 tons surfaced, 351 tons submerged
- Length: 50.5 m (166 ft)
- Beam: 4.4 m (14 ft)
- Draught: 2.81 m (9.2 ft)
- Propulsion: Two 600 hp conventional diesel engines, 2x218 hp electric engines
- Speed: 15.5 knots (29 km/h) surfaced, 7.9 knots (15 km/h) submerged
- Range: 4,500 nautical miles (8,330 km) at cruising speed on surface
- Complement: 32 officers and men
- Armament: Four 533 mm (21-inch) torpedo tubes in bow, eight anti-submarine/anti-ship torpedoes, one deck semi-auto gun 45 mm/46 21-K

М-200 Месть (Myest, meaning "vengeance" or "revenge") was a Malyutka class (Serie XV) short-range, diesel attack submarine of the Soviet Navy.

== World War Two ==
Operating in the Northern Fleet, the submarine attempted one attack on 20 July 1944 against a German convoy but was spotted by a German aircraft and received a subsequent attack with depth charges. On 15 July 1944 M-200 launched two torpedoes against a merchant, missing the target.

== Cold War ==
On 21 November 1956, while returning to port after transit to Paldiski near Tallinn, Myest was to rendezvous with the destroyer Statny. At about 19:45 hours, after spotting the destroyer, the boat's commanding officer, Captain Second Rank Yuri Pavlovich Shtikov, gave the conn to Captain Third Rank Shumanin, and went below for supper. Shumanin had previous experience in Shch-type (щука, shchuka, "pike") and С-type (средняя, srednyaja, "medium") boats, but was new to М-type (малая, Malaya, "small") boats such as M-200.

At 19:53 hours, while attempting to take station alongside the destroyer, the submarine cut across the destroyer's bow. It struck the boat on the starboard side aft, flooding the two after compartments immediately and killing the six men stationed there. Eight men escaped in the six or eight minutes before the boat sank, but two of them drowned before they could be rescued. Twenty-eight survivors were trapped in compartments one, three and four of the sunken submarine.

The submarine's emergency buoy was located at 21:05 hours, and communications were established with the remaining survivors in compartment one, the forward torpedo room. The men in compartments three and four had already died. Rescue forces began quickly arriving at the accident's scene, but were unable to provide air to the survivors.

By 04:00 hours the next morning, 22 November, the men in the submarine were prepared to use their escape equipment to leave the wreck, but were ordered to remain aboard while the senior officers on the surface developed plans to lift the boat with a floating crane. Numerous meetings occupied those officers until about 18:00 hours that evening, when the rescue attempt actually began. However, the weather had deteriorated, and when the rescue vessels began to drag anchor and the telephone cable to the sunken wreck parted, the attempt was abandoned.

At 03:47 hours the next morning, 23 November, divers located the wreck and learned that the previous evening, after the telephone line parted and communications were lost, the survivors had decided to disobey orders and escape on their own. However, the first man to use the escape hatch died in the attempt, blocking the hatch for the rest and killing them all. The submarine was never raised.
