= Israel Fisanovich =

Soviet submarine commander

Israel Ilyich Fisanovich
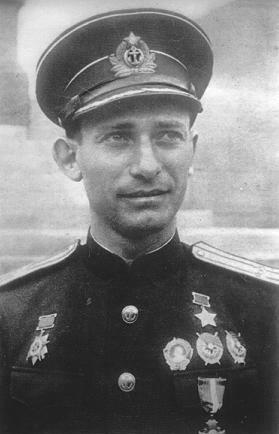
- Born: 23 November [O.S. 10 November] 1914; Elizavetograd, Russian Empire
- Died: 27 July 1944 (aged 29) Norwegian Sea
- Allegiance: Soviet Union
- Branch: Soviet Navy
- Service years: 1936–1944
- Rank: Captain 2nd Rank
- Conflicts: World War II †
- Awards: Hero of the Soviet Union; Order of Lenin; Order of the Red Banner (2); Order of Ushakov; Order of the Patriotic War; Navy Cross, U.S.

Israel Ilyich Fisanovich (Russian: Изра́иль Ильи́ч Фисано́вич sometimes transliterated as Izrail Fisanovich; 23 November [O.S. 10 November] 1914 – 27 July 1944) was a Soviet Navy submarine commander and Hero of the Soviet Union. He died when his submarine, the former HMS Sunfish, was sunk in a friendly fire incident.

== Biography ==
Fisanovich was born in a working class Jewish family in Elizavetograd (now Kropyvnytskyi, Ukraine), Russian Empire. His family moved to Kharkiv in 1922 where he finished high school. On leaving school, Fisanovich joined the Hammer and Sickle tractor factory as an apprentice. He subsequently joined the Soviet Navy and studied at the Frunze Military Academy where he was top cadet. As a prize he was presented with a silver watch by Defence Minister Voroshilov.

Fisanovich joined the Baltic Fleet in 1936 and subsequently rose to command the submarine M-84. In 1938 Fisanovich was posted to the Northern Fleet where in 1941 he was appointed to command the submarine M-172.

Fisanovich carried out 17 successful war patrols in his submarine sinking 2 warships, 10 transports and a tanker. In July 1943 he commanded a division of the submarine Brigade of the Northern Fleet.

In 1944 Fisanovich went to Britain to take command of the former HMS Sunfish which was lent to the Soviet Navy. This boat was renamed V-1 (В-1). While on passage to USSR, V-1 was attacked in error by a Coastal Command Liberator aircraft on 27 July. Fisanovich allegedly was out of the prescribed area and dived rather than staying on the surface and sending a recognition signal. The boat was lost with all hands including the British liaison officer.

In fact, the RAF and Royal Navy both held Courts of Inquiry into the loss of B-1 and her 50 Russian and one British crew. The relevant files have been released to the National Archives - see AIR 2/9279 and ADM 1/16390. Both inquiries were clear that Captain Fisanovich was almost exactly where he was supposed to be, that he did not open fire on the aircraft and that he did not crash dive when it approached.

RAF Coastal Command were searching for a U-boat believed, from Enigma decrypts, to be outbound from Trondheim. The crew of the 86 Squadron Liberator that attacked B-1 were, however, found to have been at least eighty miles off course, well inside the 'submarine sanctuary' surrounding B-1 as she made her way north, and to have ignored unmistakable signs that the submarine was friendly. Captain Fisanovich was cleared of all blame and the RAF aircrew was held fully responsible for the incident which was then hushed up to save diplomatic embarrassment ahead of the Yalta Conference.

As B-1 ex-HMS Sunfish was handed over to the Russians at the 9th Submarine Flotilla base in Dundee, Israel Fisanovich and his crew are all recorded on Dundee International Submarine Memorial.

== Awards and commemoration ==
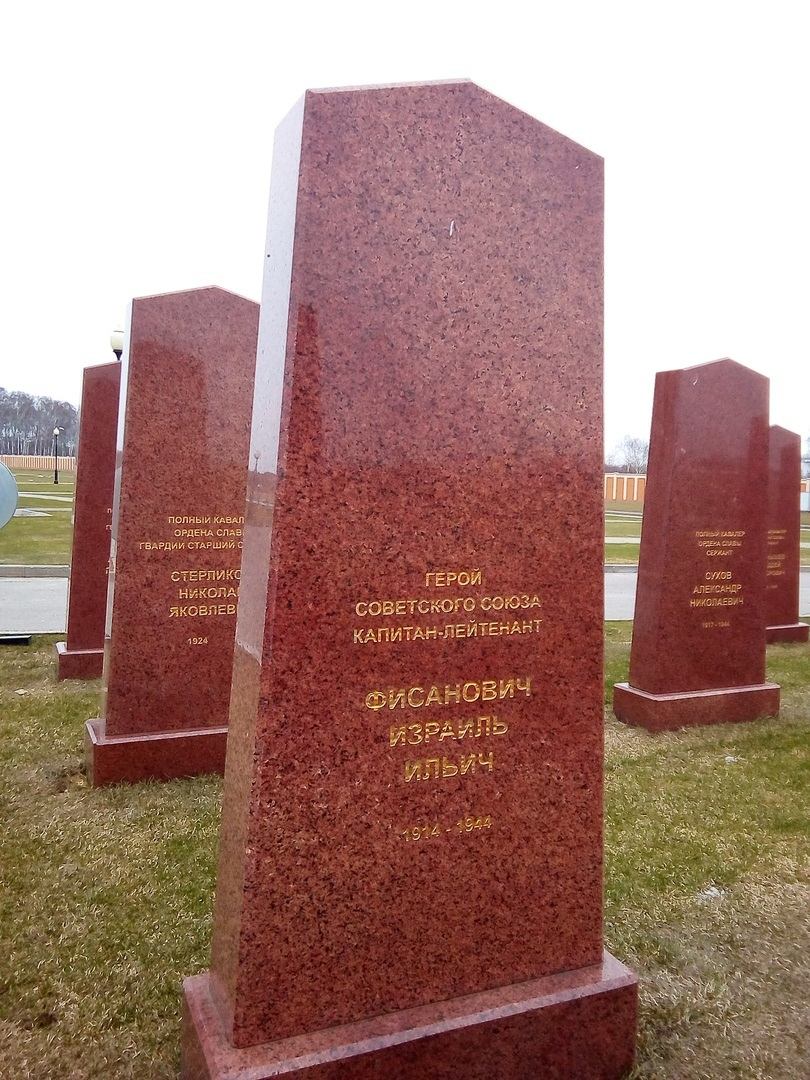
Cenotaph at Federal War Memorial Cemetery.

- Hero of the Soviet Union
- Order of Lenin
- Order of the Red Banner (twice)
- Order of Ushakov, 2nd class
- Order of the Patriotic War, 1st class
- Navy Cross, USA
- There is a monument to him in Kyiv
- There are streets named after him in Kyiv, Kharkov and Polyarny
- In 2016, a cenotaph was installed at Federal War Memorial Cemetery.
