= Yaroslav Iosseliani =

Yaroslav Konstantinovich Iosseliani
- Born: 28 February 1912; Lakhiri, Svanetia, Russian Empire
- Died: 23 March 1978 (aged 66) Tbilisi, Georgian SSR, Soviet Union
- Allegiance: Soviet Union
- Branch: Soviet Navy
- Service years: 1934–1966
- Rank: Captain 1st Rank
- Conflicts: World War II
- Awards: Hero of the Soviet Union; Order of Lenin; Order of the Red Banner (4); Order of Nakhimov; Order of the Patriotic War; Order of the Red Star

Yaroslav Iosseliani (Georgian: იაროსლავ იოსელიანი; Russian: Ярослав Константинович Иосселиани; 28 February 1912 – 23 March 1978) was a Soviet Navy submarine commander of Georgian ethnicity. He was awarded the honorary title Hero of the Soviet Union.

Iosseliani was born in the village of Lakhiri in the Svaneti region of Georgia and was educated in Gagra. He joined the Soviet Navy in 1934 and finished the Leningrad Naval branch of the Frunze Higher Naval School in 1938.

Iosseliani was posted to the Black Sea Fleet where he served on submarines Shch-207 and Shch-207 before commanding the submarine M-111. He completed 11 war patrols, made 12 attacks, sinking 2 enemy transports and a lighter, a total tonnage of 14,000.

In 1944, Iosseliani was given command of the former HMS Ursula which was transferred to the Soviet Navy under lend lease. This boat was renamed V-4 and also given the name Svanetia after Iosseliani's homeland. Under his command V-4 sunk the German submarine chaser UJ-1219.

Iosseliani retired in 1966 and moved to Tbilisi, where he died in 1978.

== Honours and awards ==
- Hero of the Soviet Union
- Order of Lenin
- Order of the Red Banner, four times
- Order of Nakhimov, 2nd class
- Order of the Patriotic War, 1st class
- Order of the Red Star
