= SS Laksnes =

German built cargo steamship

History
- Name: Marquardt Petersen (1927–1935); Sexta (1935–1938); Annelis Christophersen (1938–1945); Empire Concern (1945–1946); Laksnes (1946)
- Owner: Marquardt Petersen Reederi Geschellschaft GmbH (1927–1935); Flensburger Dampfschiff Gesellschaft von 1839 (1935–1938); H W Christophersen (1938–1945); Ministry or War Transport (1945); Ministry of Transport (1945–1946); Norwegian Government (1946); Casimiro Filho Industria Comercio (1965–1982); Petrosul (1982– )
- Operator: Marquardt Petersen Reederi Geschellschaft GmbH (1927–1935); Flensburger Dampfschiff Gesellschaft von 1839 (1935–1938); H W Christophersen (1938–1945); Harries, Bros & Co Ltd (1945–1946); Norwegian Government (1946)
- Port of registry: (Weimar Republic) Flensburg, Germany (1927–1933); (Nazi Germany) Flensburg (1933–1945); London, United Kingdom (1945–1946); Oslo, Norway (1946)
- Builder: Flensburger Schiffbau-Gesellschaft
- Launched: 1927
- Identification: Code Letters LNTH (1927–34); Code Letters DDTP (1934–1945); Code Letters GFKQ (1945–1946); Code Letters LLTM (1946); United Kingdom Official Number 180639 (1945–1946)
- Fate: Sank 27 November 1946

General characteristics
- Tonnage: 1,587 GRT; 937 NRT; 2,650 DWT
- Length: 262 ft 7 in (80.04 m)
- Beam: 40 ft 3 in (12.27 m)
- Depth: 15 ft 3 in (4.65 m)
- Installed power: Triple expansion steam engine
- Propulsion: Screw propeller

Laksnes was a 1,587 GRT cargo ship that was built in 1927 by Flensburger Schiffbau-Gesellschaft, Flensburg, Germany as Marquardt Petersen for German owners. She was sold in 1935 and renamed Sexta. Another sale in 1938 saw her renamed Annelis Christophersen.

She was seized by the Allies in 1945. Annelis Christophersen was passed to the Ministry of War Transport (MoWT) and renamed Empire Concern. In 1946, she was passed to the Norwegian Government and renamed Laksnes. She ran aground on 27 November 1946 and subsequently sank.

== Description ==
The ship was built in 1927 by Flensburger Schiffbau-Gesellschaft, Flensburg.

The ship was 262 feet 7 inches (80.04 m) long, with a beam of 40 feet 3 inches (12.27 m) and a depth of 15 feet 3 inches (4.65 m). She had a GRT of 1,581 and a NRT of 937. Her DWT was 2,650.

The ship was propelled by a triple expansion steam engine, which had cylinders of 15 2/8 inches (39 cm), 25 5/8 inches (65 cm) and 48 inches (120 cm) diameter by 29 1/2 inches (75 cm) stroke. The engine was built by Flensburger Schiffbau-Gesellschaft.

== History ==
Marquardt Petersen was built for Morquardt Petersen Reederei GmbH. Her port of registry was Flensburg and the Code Letters LNTH were allocated. Her Code Letters were changed to DDTF in 1934. In 1935, she was sold to Flensburger Dampfschiff Gesellschaft von 1839 and was renamed Sexta. In 1936, Sexta was one of 20 ships chartered to transport timber from Leningrad, Soviet Union to Germany. In 1938, Sexta was sold to H W Christophersen, Flensburg and was renamed Annelis Christophersen.

On 30 September 1942, Annelis Christophersen was attacked by the Soviet submarine Shch-310 when 35 nautical miles (65 km) north west of Stolpmünde, Germany. All four torpedoes missed their target. In May 1945, Annelis Christophersen was seized by the Allies at Flensburg. She was passed to the MoWT and renamed Empire Concern. She was placed under the management of Harries, Brothers & Co Ltd. Her port of registry was London, the code letters GFKQ and United Kingdom Official Number 180639 were allocated. In 1946, Empire Concern was passed to the Norwegian Government and was renamed Laksnes. Her port of registry was Oslo and she was allocated the Code Letters LLTM. On 23 November 1946, F N Nordbø, Haugesund agreed to buy the ship. On 27 November, Laksnes ran aground at Rongevær, Norway. She broke in two and then sank. She was on a voyage from Brevik to Namsos with a cargo of cement. The wreck was raised and scrapped in 1950.
