= Șoimul-class torpedo boat =

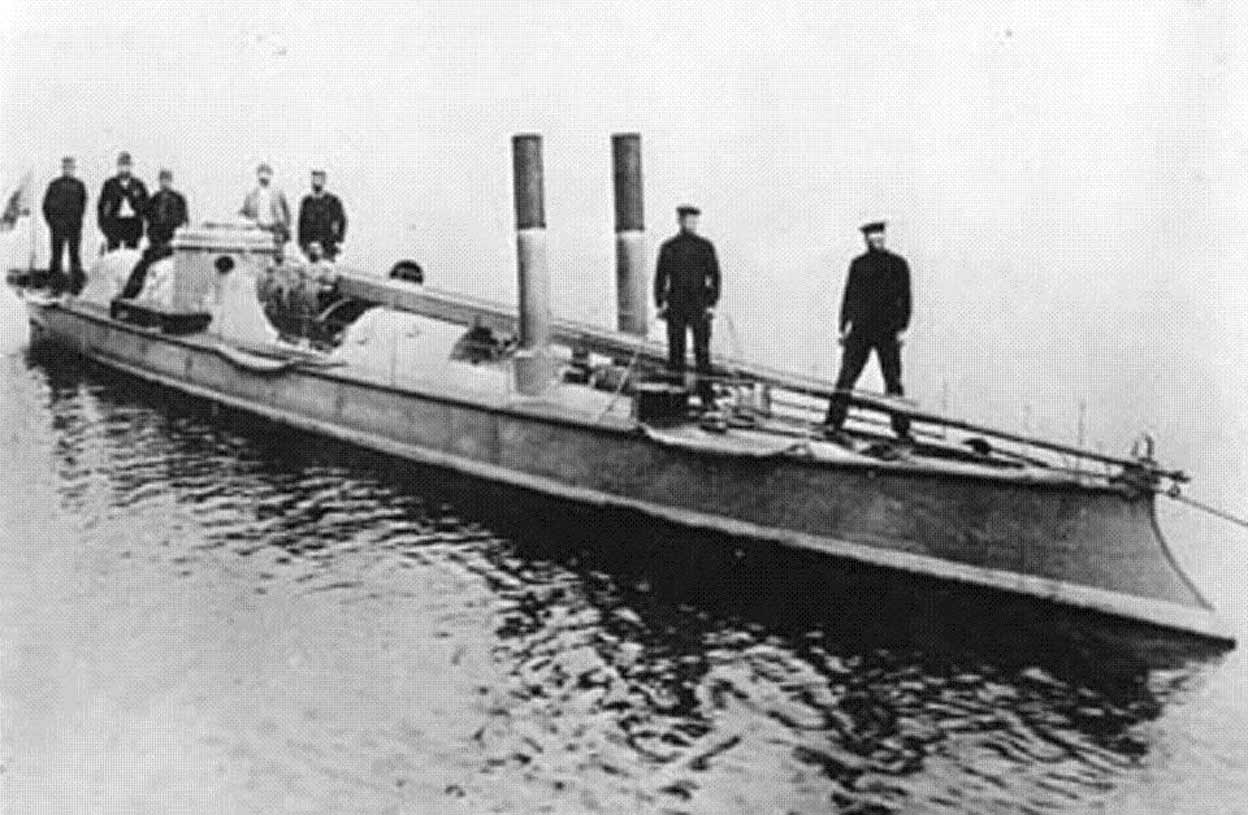
- Șoimul

Class overview
- Name: Șoimul-class torpedo boat
- Builders: Yarrow, London
- Operators: Royal Romanian Navy
- Built: 1882
- In service: 1882–1949?
- Completed: 2
- Retired: 2

General characteristics
- Type: Torpedo boat
- Displacement: 12 tons
- Length: 19.2 m (63 ft)
- Beam: 2.43 m (8 ft)
- Draft: 0.91 m (3 ft)
- Propulsion: 1 shaft, 150 hp (112 kW)
- Speed: 16.5 knots (30.6 km/h; 19.0 mph)
- Complement: 8
- Armament: 1 × spar torpedo
- Notes: Armored conning tower

The Șoimul class was a pair of spar torpedo boats of the Romanian Navy. They were built in 1882 and served until the end of the 1940s.

== Construction and specifications ==
The two boats were built by Yarrow in London. Each displaced 12 tons and measured 19.2 metres (63 ft) in length, with a beam of 2.43 metres (8.0 ft) and a draft of 0.91 metres (3.0 ft). The power plant had an output of 150 horsepower (112 kW) powering a single shaft, resulting in a top speed of 16.5 knots (30.6 km/h; 19.0 mph). Armament consisted of one spar torpedo, manoeuvred from an armoured conning tower astern. Each boat had a complement of eight.

== Career ==
The two boats are indicated to have served until the Second World War and in the few years afterwards. There were ten armed motor launches with displacements ranging from 9 to 30 tons known to have served during the war: four of the Number 31 class (9 tons) and four of Trotușul class (30 tons), leaving the two spar torpedo boats as the remaining vessels to complete the group of ten.
