= French submarine Minerve (1934) =

Coordinates: 50°31′01″N 2°27′06″W

History

France
- Name: Minerve (Q185/P26)
- Namesake: Minerva
- Builder: Arsenal de Cherbourg
- Laid down: 17 August 1931
- Launched: 23 October 1934
- Commissioned: 15 September 1936
- Fate: Wrecked, 19 September 1945

General characteristics
- Type: Submarine
- Displacement: 662 long tons (673 t) surfaced; 856 long tons (870 t) submerged
- Length: 68.1 m (223 ft 5 in)
- Beam: 5.6 m (18 ft 4 in)
- Draught: 4 m (13 ft 1 in)
- Propulsion: 2 × Vickers-Normand diesel engines, 1,800 bhp (1,342 kW); 2 × Electric motors, 1,230 shp (917 kW)
- Speed: 14.2 knots (26.3 km/h; 16.3 mph) surfaced; 9 knots (17 km/h; 10 mph) submerged
- Range: 2,000 nmi (3,700 km; 2,300 mi) at 10 knots (19 km/h; 12 mph) surfaced; 85 nmi (157 km; 98 mi) at 5 knots (9.3 km/h; 5.8 mph) submerged
- Test depth: 80 m (260 ft)
- Complement: 42
- Armament: 1 × 75 mm (3 in)/35 Model 1928 deck gun with 150 rounds; 2 × 13.2 mm (0.52 in) AA machine guns; 6 × 550 mm (21.7 in) internal torpedo tubes (4 bow/2 stern) with 12 torpedoes; 3 × 400 mm (15.7 in) external torpedo tubes

Minerve (Q185/P26) was the lead ship of the Minerve-class submarines of the French Navy. Commissioned in 1936, during World War II she served in the Free French Naval Forces, and was wrecked in late 1945.

== Ship history ==
Minerve was built at the Arsenal de Cherbourg, laid down on 17 August 1931, launched on 23 October 1934, and commissioned on 15 September 1936 into the 2e Escadrille des Sous-Marins ("2nd Submarine Squadron") for service in the Atlantic.

In August 1939 she was based at Oran, and was detached in November 1939 to carry out surveillance around the Canary Islands. Between February and May 1940 Minerve acted as an escort to seven convoys between Gibraltar and Liverpool.

When the Germans invaded France on 10 May 1940 she was laid up undergoing maintenance, so on 18 June 1940 Minerve, under the command of Lieutenant de Vaisseau Bazin left Brest towed by the tugboat Zeelew. She was accompanied by her sister ship Junon towed by the Nessus, and escorted by the patrol vessels Pessac and Sauternes. Off Ushant, they were joined by the destroyer HMS Broke, and arrived at Plymouth on the 20th.

On 3 July 1940 Minerve (along with all other French naval vessels in British ports) was boarded by Royal Navy troops as part of Operation Catapult, and the crew interned.

Minerve was transferred to the control of the Free French Naval Forces in September 1940, and renumbered P26. She was recommissioned in January 1941 under the command of Lieutenant de Vaisseau Pierre Sonneville and while based at Dundee carried out patrols around the coast of Scotland, in the North Sea, and the Atlantic.

On 19 April 1941 Minerve attacked the Norwegian oil tanker Tiger off Egersund, Norway. Both torpedoes missed, and the submarine sustained some damage from depth charges dropped by escorting German destroyers, but managed to escape. In April 1942, she was part of the covering force escorting Convoy PQ 15 to Murmansk.

From October 1942 Minerve was under the command of Capitaine de Corvette Henri Simon-Dubuisson.

On 10 October 1943, while on a patrol of the Western Approaches from Plymouth, Minerve surfaced to carry out repairs on a diesel engine while about 300 nautical miles west of Brest. She was attacked in error by a RAF Coastal Command B-24 Liberator with rockets. Two crewmen were killed and two wounded, and the submarine's hull was badly damaged, but she managed to return to Britain escorted by the destroyer HMS Wensleydale.

On 19 September 1945, Minerve was being towed to France, but broke free in heavy weather and was wrecked on Portland Bill.

== See also ==
- List of submarines of France
- Dundee International Submarine Memorial
