= SS Oldenburg =

German cargo ship and auxiliary cruiser

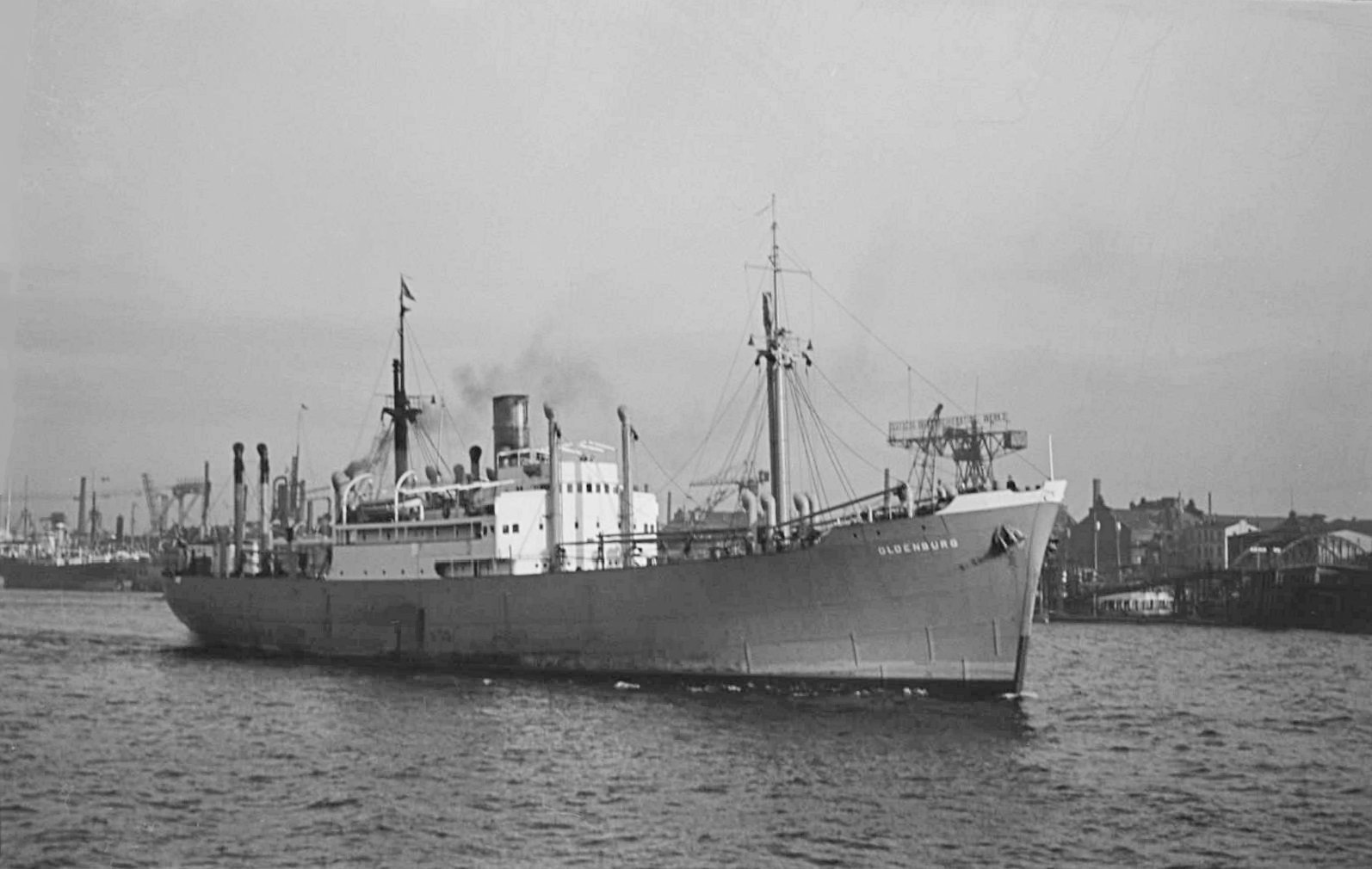
- Oldenburg

History

Germany
- Name: 1936: Oldenburg; 1939: Schiff 35
- Namesake: Oldenburg
- Owner: Oldenburg-Portugiesische DS-Rhed.
- Operator: 1939: Kriegsmarine
- Port of registry: 1936: (Nazi Germany) Oldenburg, Germany
- Builder: Deutsche Werft, Hamburg
- Yard number: 178
- Launched: 29 June 1936
- Completed: September 1936
- Identification: 1936: call sign DNBB; 1939: pennant number TS(K)5
- Fate: Sunk April 1940

General characteristics
- Type: 1936: cargo ship; 1939: auxiliary cruiser
- Tonnage: 2,312 GRT, 1,223 NRT
- Length: 287.9 ft (87.8 m)
- Beam: 45.8 ft (14.0 m)
- Depth: 18.1 ft (5.5 m)
- Decks: 1
- Installed power: compound steam engine + exhaust steam turbine; 404 NHP
- Propulsion: 1 × screw propeller
- Speed: 12.5 knots (23 km/h)
- Sensors & processing systems: wireless direction finding; echo sounding device
- Notes: sister ship: Casablanca

SS Oldenburg was a German cargo steamship that was built for the Oldenburg-Portugiesische Dampfschiffs-Rhederei (OPDR) in 1936. In 1939 the Kriegsmarine requisitioned her; had her converted into an auxiliary cruiser; and commissioned her as Schiff 35. A Royal Navy submarine sank her during the Norwegian campaign in April 1940.

This was the third ship in OPDR's fleet to be named Oldenburg. The first and second were steamships built in 1881 and 1900. The fourth and fifth were motor ships built in 1950 and 1970.

== Building and registration ==
In 1936 Deutsche Werft in Hamburg built a pair of sister ships for OPDR. Yard number 178 was launched on 29 June 1936 as Oldenburg, and completed that September. Yard number 179 was launched as Casablanca.

Oldenburg's registered length was 287.9 ft (87.8 m), her beam was 45.8 ft (14.0 m), and her depth was 18.1 ft (5.5 m). Her tonnages were 2,312 GRT and 1,223 NRT. She had wireless direction finding, and an echo sounding device. She had a slightly flared bow, and a cruiser stern.

Oldenburg had a single screw propeller, and a four-cylinder compound steam engine, with two high-pressure and two low-pressure cylinders. She also had a Bauer-Wach exhaust steam turbine, which was connected to her propeller shaft via a Föttinger fluid coupling and double reduction gearing. The combined power of her piston engine and turbine was rated at 404 NHP, and gave her a speed of 12.5 knots (23 km/h).

OPDR registered Oldenburg in Oldenburg. Her call sign was DNBB.

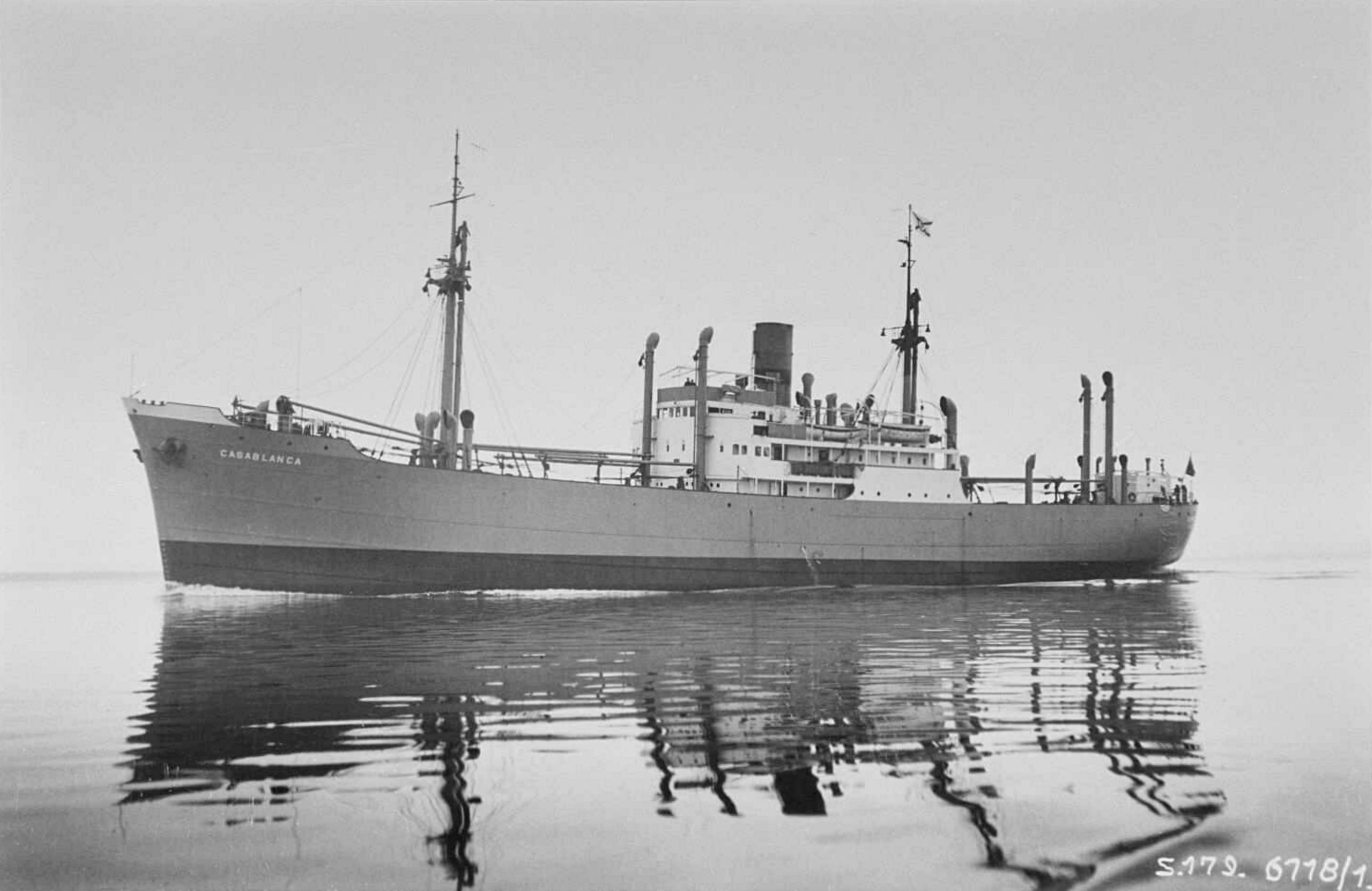
Oldenburg's sister ship Casablanca

== War service ==
On 12 October 1939 the Kriegsmarine requisitioned Oldenburg and had her converted into an auxiliary cruiser. She was commissioned as Schiff 35, with the pennant number TS(K)5. On 23 December she was assigned to 6 Vorpostengrüppe, and on 22 January 1940 she was placed under the control of the Führer der Sonderverband West. She was used as a Q ship.

On 8 April 1940, Germany invaded Denmark and began to invade Norway. On 14 April, HMS Sunfish torpedoed Schiff 35 in Marstrand Fjord, off Skagen, Denmark. Schiff 35 sank at position 57°50′N 11°15′E, and three members of her crew were killed.

== Bibliography ==
- Gröner, Erich (1993). Die deutschen Kriegsschiffe 1815-1945 (in German). Vol. 8/I: Flußfahrzeuge, Ujäger, Vorpostenboote, Hilfsminensucher, Küstenschutzverbände (Teil 1). Koblenz: Bernard & Graefe. ISBN 3-7637-4807-5.
- Lloyd's Register of Shipping. Vol. II.–Steamers & Motorships of 300 tons. Trawlers, tugs, dredgers, &c. London: Lloyd's Register of Shipping. 1939 – via Southampton City Council.
