= Soviet M-class submarine =

Submarines built in Soviet Union during World War II

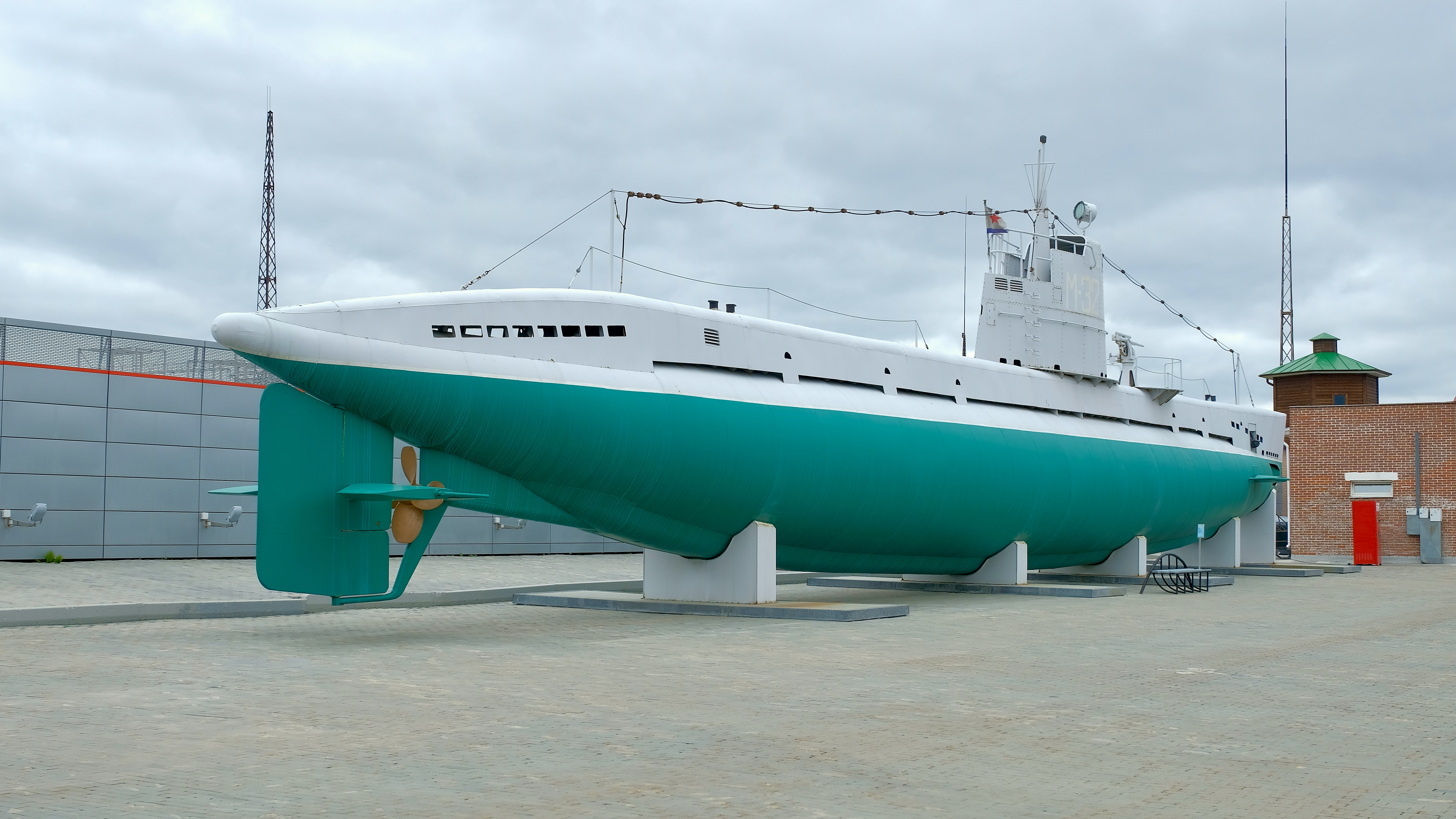
- Series XII M-class submarine

Class overview
- Operators: Soviet Navy; Polish Navy; People's Liberation Army Navy; Bulgarian Navy; Egyptian Navy
- Preceded by: None
- Succeeded by: Quebec class
- In service: 1933
- In commission: 1933
- Planned: 141
- Completed: 141
- Lost: 33
- Retired: 108

General characteristics
- Type: Submarine
- Displacement: VI: 158 tons surfaced; 198 tons submerged; VI-bis: 161 tons surfaced; 201 tons submerged; XII: 206 tons surfaced; 256 tons submerged; XV: 281 tons surfaced; 351 tons submerged
- Length: VI to XII: 37.50 m (123 ft 0 in); XV: 50.0 m (164 ft 1 in)
- Beam: VI and VI-bis: 3.1 m (10 ft 2 in); XII: 3.3 m (10 ft 10 in); XV: 4.9 m (16 ft 1 in)
- Draft: VI and VI-bis: 2.6 m (8 ft 6 in); XII: 2.9 m (9 ft 6 in); XV: 3.6 m (11 ft 10 in)
- Speed: VI and VI-bis: 13.1 knots (24 km/h) surfaced; 7.4 knots (14 km/h) submerged; XII: 14.1 knots (26 km/h) surfaced; 8.2 knots (15 km/h) submerged; XV: 15 knots (28 km/h) surfaced; 10 knots (19 km/h) submerged
- Complement: VI to XII: 16-19; XV: 32
- Armament: VI to XII: 2 × 533 mm (21 in) bow torpedo tubes; XV: 4 × 533 mm (21 in) torpedo tubes (2 bow, 2 stern); All series: 1 × 45 mm (2 in) semi-automatic gun

The M-class submarines, also Malyutka class (Russian: Малютка; baby or little one), were a class of small, single-, or 1½-hulled coastal submarines built in the Soviet Union and used during World War II. The submarines were built in sections so they could easily be transported by rail. The production was centered in the Gorky Shipyard on the Volga River, after which the sections were transported by railway to Leningrad for assembly and fitting out. This was the first use of welding on Soviet submarines.

== History ==
=== 1930s to 1940s ===
Submarines of this class were in four series: VI, VI-bis, XII, XV. The number of VI and VI-bis series boats were almost equal. Series XII was a re-developed project with equivalent tactical characteristics. The first series were powered by one diesel engine and one electric motor. Series XV had developed separately with improved characteristics, including the main ballast in light hull and two shafts. These vessels were mainly used by the Black Sea Fleet and the Baltic Fleet.

Although the design was satisfactory, only limited results were obtained and losses were heavy with 33 submarines sunk between 1941 and 1945. M-103 disappeared in the Baltic Sea in mid-August 1941. The wreck was discovered in the late 1990s during a NATO minesweeping training exercise. Seven submarines were lost in the Black Sea, four depth-charged and sunk by Romanian warships (M-31 by the flotilla leader Mărășești, M-58 by the destroyer Regina Maria, M-59 by the destroyer Regele Ferdinand and M-118 by the Romanian gunboats Ghiculescu and Stihi) (both M-58 and M-59 however are also reported as lost on Romanian laid mines, while M-31 was also claimed by mines or a German vessel ) and three were sunk in minefields laid by the Romanian minelayers Amiral Murgescu, Dacia and Regele Carol I. By 1945, some 111 M-class submarines had been completed, with another 30 XV-series completed between 1945 and 1947.

=== Cold War ===
Two submarines of the early series of this class, along with two Soviet S-class submarines, (S-52 and S-53) and two Shchuka-class submarines (under lease, S-121 and S-123) were sold to the People's Republic of China in June 1954 as the foundation of the People's Liberation Army Navy Submarine Force. Both the M- and S-class submarines were sold to China, and two more M-XV series of this class (M-278 and M-279) were sold to China a few years later in 1956.Those purchased by China were renamed, but the two leased Shchuka-class submarines were not. The four M-class submarines bought by China were renamed National Defense # 21, 22, 23 (ex M-278) and 24 (ex M-279) respectively.

=== Modern times ===
An M-class submarine was discovered near Tallinn in May 2012. The submarine is located in Tallinn Bay between the islands of Aegna and Naissaar, at an approximate depth of 65 to 66 metres (213 to 217 ft). It is believed to be M-216, which was intentionally sunk in the area in 1962 for training purposes. Divers have confirmed that many components, including the periscope, are missing. It is also believed that the training exercise may have been ordered as a result of several deadly submarine accidents in the 1950s. One such accident happened near Paldiski, where the entire crew of M-200 died during a failed rescue operation.

In July 2015, another M-class (series XII) submarine was found in the Black Sea by divers off the Romanian coast at Costinești, at an approximate depth of 40 metres (130 ft). It is believed to be either M-34 or M-58, both being lost to Romanian minefields. The submarine is buried in sand up to the deck level and also completely filled with sand, making any further identification almost impossible. The upper part of the hull shows a pretty high level of damage - many ribs are exposed. The aft hatch was partially opened. The hull is in one piece, with the conning tower and deck gun intact.

In April 2025, after a 20-year search, M-class submarine M-49 was found in the Peter the Great Gulf. M-49 had gone missing on 16 August 1941.

== Versions ==
Series VI
30 submarines constructed between 1932 and 1934 were 37.5 m long and displaced 201 tons submerged (158 tons surfaced).

- M-1
- M-2
- M-3
- M-4
- M-5
- M-6
- M-7
- M-8
- M-9
- M-10
- M-11
- M-12
- M-13
- M-14
- M-15
- M-16
- M-17
- M-18
- M-19
- M-20
- M-21
- M-22
- M-23
- M-24
- M-25
- M-26
- M-27
- M-28
- M-51
- M-52

Series VI-bis
20 submarines built in four sections between 1934 and 1936) were 37.5 m long and displaced 202 tons submerged (161 tons surfaced).

Name	Commissioned	Fate
M-43	6 November 1935	Was M-82 until 1939. Stricken 28 November 1950. Transferred to China in 1954 as 205.
M-44	27 November 1935	Was M-84 until 1939. Stricken 28 November 1950. Transferred to China in 1954 as 200.
M-45	4 November 1935	Was M-85 until 1939. Stricken 28 November 1950. Transferred to China in 1954 as 201.
M-46	4 November 1935	Was M-86 until 1939. Stricken 28 November 1950. Transferred to China in 1954 as 202.
M-47	10 June 1935	Was M-53 until 1939. Transferred to China in 1954 as 203.
M-48	19 October 1936	Was M-56 until 1939. Transferred to China in 1954 as 204.
M-54	14 October 1936	Ran aground on 10 December 1941; later salvaged and repaired. Decommissioned 18 October 1944 and stricken 19 December 1944.
M-55	17 October 1936	Stricken 19 December 1944.
M-71	24 August 1935	Scuttled at Libau on 24 June 1941 to prevent capture.
M-72	24 August 1935	Struck a mine in the Gulf of Finland on 28 June 1941, causing heavy damage. Decommissioned to reserve in August 1941 and stricken on 2 December 1944.
M-73	24 August 1935	Decommissioned to reserve in August 1941. Stricken 2 December 1944.
M-74	24 August 1935	Bombed and sunk by German aircraft at Kronstadt on 23 September 1941. Raised in 1942, but deemed not worth repairing. Stricken 2 December 1944.
M-75	24 August 1935	Decommissioned to reserve in August 1941. Stricken 2 December 1944.
M-76	24 August 1935	Decommissioned to reserve in 1941. Stricken 2 December 1944.
M-77	19 June 1936	Served on Lake Ladoga in 1943. Stricken 22 February 1949.
M-78	19 June 1936	Sunk by U-144 west of Widawa (now Ventspils) on 23 June 1941.
M-79	15 July 1936	Served on Lake Ladoga in 1943. Stricken 22 February 1949.
M-80	15 July 1936	Scuttled at Libau on 24 June 1941 to prevent capture.
M-81	15 July 1936	Sunk by mine off Vormsi, Estonia on 1 July 1941.
M-83	8 November 1935	Scuttled off Libau on 27 June 1941 while returning to port.

Series XII
46 submarines built in six sections between 1936 and 1941 were 44.5 m long, and displaced 258 tons submerged (206 tons surfaced).

Name	Commissioned	Fate
M-30	31 August 1940	Was M-61 and M-58 until 1939. Decommissioned 12 November 1952.
M-31	7 November 1940	Was M-64 and M-61 until 1939. Missing off Fidonisi Island after 17 December 1942.
M-32	7 November 1940	Was M-65 and M-62 until 1939. Stricken 13 March 1953 and scrapped later that year. A model of M-32 is on display at Verkhnyaya Pyshma.
M-33	18 December 1940	Was M-66 and M-63 until 1939. Damaged by an interior fire on 23 June 1942 but was repaired and returned to service. Sunk by a Romanian mine off Odesa, Ukraine between 22 August and 25 August 1942. Wreck discovered in June 1951 during preparations for raising M-60. Both submarines were raised together and later scrapped.
M-34		Was M-67 and M-64 until 1939. Sank off Constanta, Romania on 3 November 1941.
M-35		Was M-68 and M-65 until 1939. Decommissioned 17 August 1953 and converted into floating charging station PZS-16. Stricken 20 June 1956 and scrapped.
M-36		Was M-69 and M-66 until 1939. Sank off the Georgian coast on 4 January 1944 during post-repair sea trials.
M-49		Was M-57 until 1939. Missing off Vladivostok after 16 August 1941; probably struck a Soviet mine by accident. Wreck found in April 2025.
M-58		Briefly renamed to M-55 in 1939-1940 before returning to M-58. Sank in the Danube estuary area between 17 and 21 October 1941, likely by a mine. Wreck possibly found in 2015.
M-59		Briefly renamed to M-56 in 1939-1940 before returning to M-59. Sank east of Constanta in early November 1941, likely by a mine.
M-60		Briefly renamed to M-57 in 1939-1940 before returning to M-60. Sank near Odesa, Ukraine between 23 and 26 September 1942, likely by a Romanian mine. Wreck discovered by a trawler in 1948, surveyed in 1950 and raised in July 1951 along with M-33.
M-62		Briefly renamed to M-59 in 1939-1940 before returning to M-62. Became a training submarine in 1949. Stricken 17 August 1953 and scrapped 1 October 1953.
M-63		Briefly renamed to M-60 in 1939-1940 before returning to M-63. Missing off Vladivostok after 17 August 1941; probably struck a Soviet mine by accident.
M-90		Decommissioned 12 (or 13) November 1952 and reclassified as a training submarine. Stricken 26 June 1954 and later scrapped.
M-92		Was R-1 from 1940-1947. Used as an experimental submarine to develop air-independent propulsion systems. Scrapped in 1952.
M-94		Sunk by U-140 in the Baltic Sea off Hiiumaa, Estonia on 21 July 1941. Discovered in 2019 during an Estonian hydrographic survey.
M-95		Missing in the Gogland area after 14 June 1942. Wreck found in 1989 and identified in 2004. In 2015 it was determined that M-95 was sunk by a Finnish mine.
M-96		Was M-98 before 1940. Sunk by a German mine in Narva Bay on 8 September 1944. Wreck discovered in 2020.
M-97		Was M-99 before 1940. Sunk by depth charges from Finnish patrol boat VMV 5 off Suursaari Island on 15 August 1942. Wreck found in 1990.
M-98		Was M-96 before December 1939. Sunk by mine in the Gulf of Finland on 14 or 15 November 1941. As of 2019, a search is underway to locate M-98.
M-99		Was M-97 before December 1939. Sunk by U-149 east of Dago Island on 27 June 1941. Wreck yet to be found as of 2018.
M-102		Decommissioned 16 November 1945 and became a training submarine. Disarmed and converted into a training station on 17 August 1953 and renamed KBP-30. Converted into a dummy submarine to practice dives on 21 October 1953. Stricken 27 November 1953 and scrapped.
M-103		Sunk by mine in the Gulf of Finland north of Vormsi Island on or after 25 August 1941. Wreck found in 1999.
M-104 "Yaroslavsky Komsomolets"		Withdrawn from combat use, disarmed and converted to combat training room KBP-27 on 17 August 1953. Sank at Baku in 1958, but was raised. Stricken 19 September 1960 and scrapped. Some parts and a copy of the conning tower are on display in Yaroslavl.
M-105 "Chelyabinsky Komsomolets"		Received an anti-sonar coating in 1950. Reclassified as a training submarine on 17 August 1953. Stricken 10 June 1955 and scrapped.
M-106 "Leninsky Komsomol"		Rammed and depth charged by German submarine chasers UJ 1206, UJ 1212, UJ 1214 and UJ 1217 near Vardö, Norway on 5 July 1943.
M-107 "Novosibirsk Komsomolets"		
M-108		Missing off Kongsfjord after 28 February 1944; probably sunk by a mine.
M-111		
M-112		
M-113		
M-114		
M-115		
M-116		
M-117		
M-118		Sunk off Cape Burnas by Romanian minesweepers Sublocotenant Ghiculescu and Locotenant-Commandor Stihi Eugen on 1 October 1942.
M-119		
M-120		
M-121		Sunk by mine off Varangerfjord, Norway between 8 and 14 October 1942.
M-122		Sunk by aircraft from JG 5 off the Rybachiy peninsula on 14 May 1943.)
M-171		Was M-87 before June 1939. Modified to an underwater minelayer (Project 604) in 1944. Although it performed well in trials, hostilities had ended in the north and the submarine never saw combat. Decommissioned 28 November 1950 and converted to a training submarine. Renamed STZh-16 on 4 September 1953 and UTS-65 on 26 January 1957. Stricken 30 June 1960 and scrapped.
M-172		Was M-88 before June 1939. Missing off the Varangerfjord after 1 October 1943. Likely sunk by a German mine.
M-173		Was M-89 before June 1939. Missing after 6 August 1942. Likely sunk by a mine off Vardo, Norway.
M-174		Was M-91 before June 1939. Missing off the Varangerfjord after 14 October 1943. Likely sunk by a German mine.
M-175		Was M-92 before June 1939. Sunk by U-584 off the Rybachiy peninsula on 10 January 1942.
M-176		Was M-93 before June 1939. Missing off the Varangerfjord after 21 June 1942. Likely sunk by a German mine on or around 3 July 1942.

Series XV
4 submarines built in seven sections during World War II while other 12 built after it, until 1953 were 53.0 m long, and displaced 420 tons submerged (350 tons surfaced).

Name	Commissioned	Fate
M-200 "Myest"	20 March 1943	Sank in the Baltic Sea following a collision with Soviet destroyer Statny on 21 November 1956. Following a botched rescue mission that resulted in the deaths of the entire crew, the submarine was never raised.
M-201	16 April 1943	
M-202	19 February 1944	
M-203	28 October 1944	
M-204	25 June 1947	Construction suspended during WWII but completed postwar.
M-205	22 July 1947	Construction suspended during WWII but completed postwar.
M-206	30 September 1947	Construction suspended during WWII but completed postwar.
M-207		Order cancelled. Dismantled on slipways.
M-208		Order cancelled. Dismantled on slipways.
M-209		Order cancelled. Dismantled on slipways.
M-210		Cancelled before being laid down.
M-211		Cancelled before being laid down.
M-212		Cancelled before being laid down.
M-213		Cancelled before being laid down.
M-214	14 August 1948	
M-215	31 October 1947	
M-216	5 November 1947	
M-217	10 November 1947	
M-218	10 November 1947	
M-219		Never completed. Used as a floating oil storage facility at Plant No. 402.
M-234	31 July 1948	
M-235	25 August 1948	
M-236	19 October 1948	Transferred to Poland in 1954 as ORP Krakowiak.
M-290	30 September 1952	Transferred to Poland in 1954 as ORP Kaszub. Ran aground near Krynica Morska on 28 November 1957, killing two crew. Decommissioned in 1963 and subsequently scrapped.

Both series VI and VI-bis were constructed by A. N. Asafov. Series XII was made by P. I. Serdyuk and series XV was created by F. F. Polushkin.

Series VI

Series VI-bis

Series XII

Series XV
