= Shchuka-class submarine =

Submarine produced in the Soviet Union

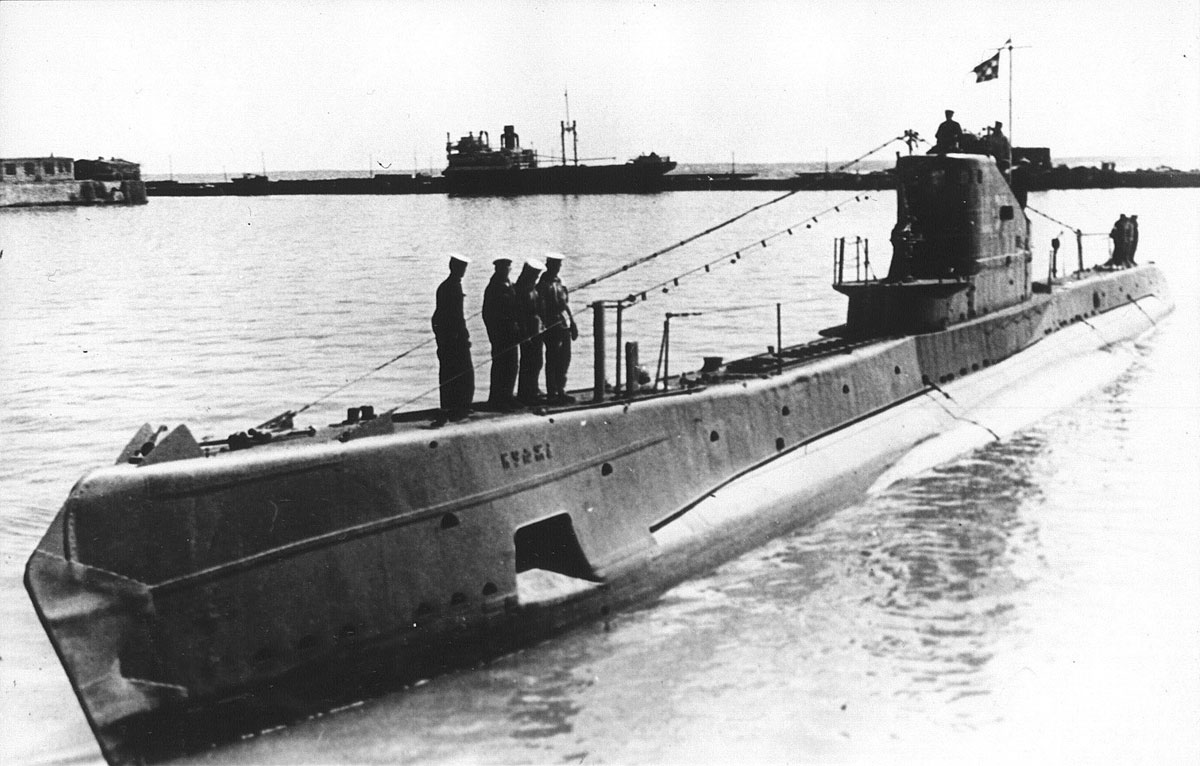
- Shch-311 was a Series V-bis-2 Shchuka of the Baltic Fleet

Class overview
- Operators: Soviet Navy
- Preceded by: Leninets class
- Succeeded by: Pravda class; Soviet S class
- In service: 1932
- In commission: 1956
- Completed: 88
- Lost: 35

General characteristics
- Type: Submarine
- Displacement: 577 tons surfaced; 704 tons submerged
- Length: 57 m (187 ft 0 in)
- Beam: 6.2 m (20 ft 4 in)
- Draught: 3.78 m (12 ft 5 in)
- Propulsion: 2 shaft diesel electric, 1,020 kW (1,370 hp) diesel, 600 kW (800 hp) electric
- Speed: surface - 12.5 kn (23.2 km/h; 14.4 mph); submerged - 6.3 kn (11.7 km/h; 7.2 mph)
- Range: 6,000 nmi (11,000 km; 6,900 mi) at 8 kn (15 km/h; 9.2 mph)
- Test depth: 91 m (300 ft)
- Complement: 38
- Armament: 4 × bow torpedo tubes; 2 × stern torpedo tubes; (10 torpedoes); 2 × 45 mm (1.8 in) semi-automatic guns

The Shchuka-class submarines (Russian: Щука), also referred to as Sh or Shch-class submarines, were a medium-sized class of Soviet submarines, built in large numbers and used during World War II. "Shchuka" is Russian for pike. Of this class, only two submarines (411 and 412) entered service after 1945, although they were launched before the war.

== Development ==
On 23 January 1930, the USSR Revolutionary Military Council (Revvoensoviet) adapted a proposed submarine concept that were to "execute positioning service on closed theatres". Plans were made to construct up to 200 submarines in three main versions, the later ones would be larger and with longer range than the previous versions. However, due to the outbreak of World War II, only 88 submarines were commissioned. It was still to be the second most numerous submarine class of the Soviet Navy (only the M class were more numerous with 111 built). Seven ship construction yards were involved in the program - No. 189, 190, 194 in Leningrad, No. 112 in Gorky, No. 200 in Nikolaev and No. 202 in Vladivostok.

The name of the class was taken from the individual name of the first submarine Shch-301 Shchuka. Their numbering depended on which Soviet fleet they belonged to: the 100-series belonged to the Pacific Fleet, the 200-series to the Black Sea Fleet, the 300-series to the Baltic Fleet, and the 400-series to the Northern Fleet. There were however some special cases, i.e. the Northern Fleet submarine Shch-424 was renamed Shch-321 when she was transferred to the Baltic Fleet via the Stalin Canal (and later renamed back to Shch-424 when returning). The conning tower had brass symbols as identifiers (Щ-XXX, where the XXX is the number).

== Operational service ==
The Shchukas suffered heavy losses during the war. The Baltic, Black Sea and Northern Fleets lost 60–70% of their submarines. However, the submarines of the Pacific Fleet did not suffer any losses to the Japanese due to the tranquil nature of the theatre (military operations commenced only in the autumn of 1945 when the Japanese fleet largely was defeated). Three submarines were, however, lost to non-combat reasons. In all, 35 Shchuka-class submarines were lost, the vast majority during World War II.

The last surviving submarines of the class in the Soviet Navy were decommissioned in the mid-1950s and scrapped during the following years, but two submarines of this class (S-121 and S-123), along with two Soviet M-class submarines were supplied to People's Liberation Army Navy in June, 1954, thus becoming the foundation of the submarine force of the People's Republic of China. However, the two Shchuka-class submarines were not sold, but instead, loaned to China for training Chinese crews and were thus not given new names like the M-class submarines.

== Ships of the class ==
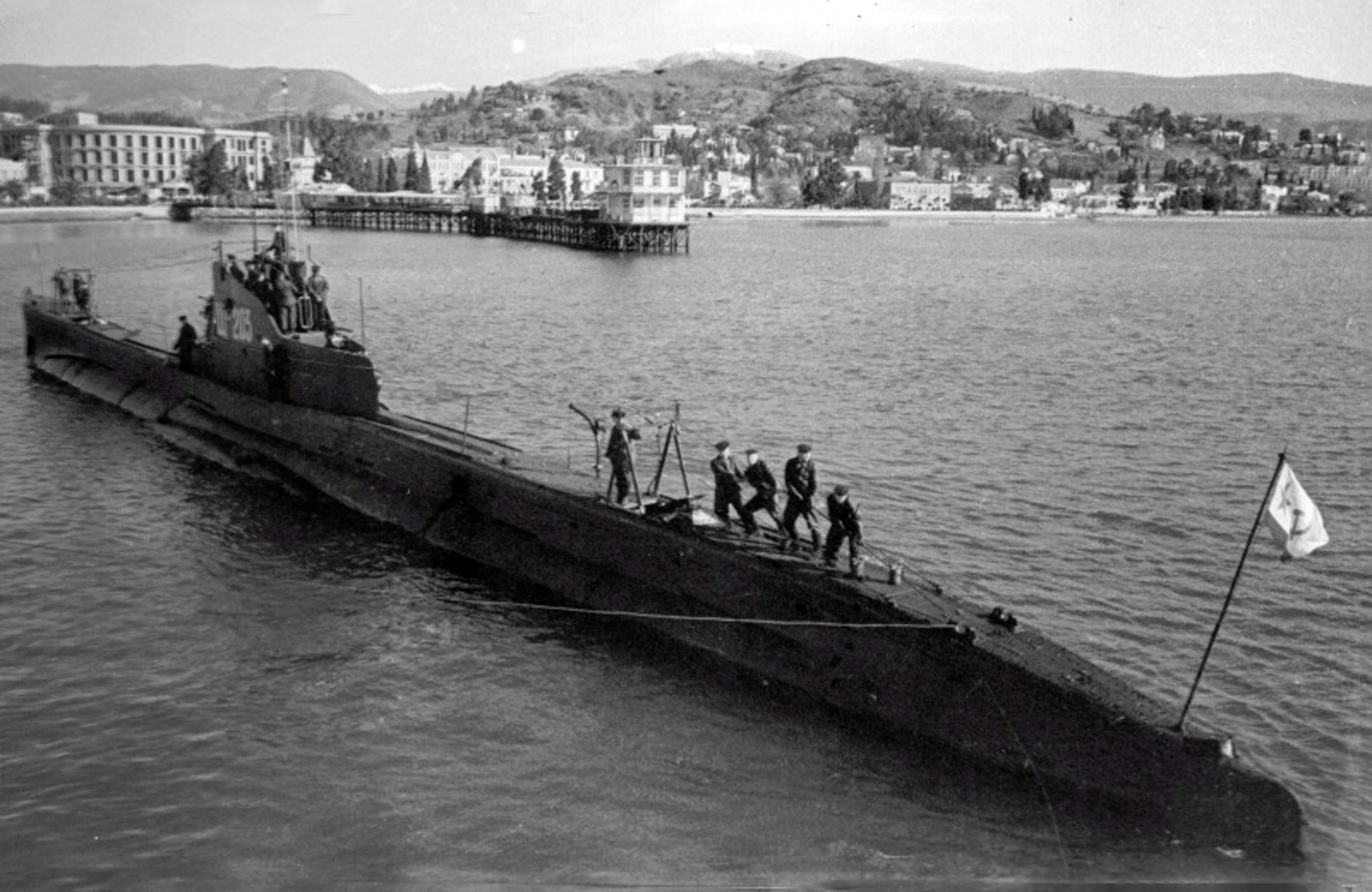
Shch-203 of the Black Sea Fleet. Probably, in 1942.

=== Pacific Fleet ===
Series V formed the first 12 Shchukas of the Pacific Fleet

Pacific Fleet Shchukas Shch-121, Shch-122, Shch-123, Shch-124 and Shch-125 were in Series V-bis-2

The Pacific fleet had 10 Series X Shchukas: Shch-126, Shch-127, Shch-128, Shch-129, Shch-130, Shch-131, Shch-132, Shch-133, Shch-134 and Shch-139

- Shch-101
- Shch-102
- Shch-103 (lost 4 November 1935)
- Shch-104
- Shch-105
- Shch-106
- Shch-107
- Shch-108
- Shch-109
- Shch-110
- Shch-111
- Shch-112
- Shch-113
- Shch-114
- Shch-115
- Shch-116
- Shch-117 (renamed S-117; lost 15 December 1952)
- Shch-118
- Shch-119
- Shch-120
- Shch-121
- Shch-122
- Shch-123
- Shch-124
- Shch-125
- Shch-126
- Shch-127
- Shch-128
- Shch-129
- Shch-130
- Shch-131
- Shch-132
- Shch-133
- Shch-134
- Shch-135
- Shch-136
- Shch-137
- Shch-138 (lost 18 July 1942)
- Shch-139

=== Black Sea Fleet ===
The Black Sea fleet's first Shchukas, Shch-201, Shch-202 and Shch-203, were in Series V-bis

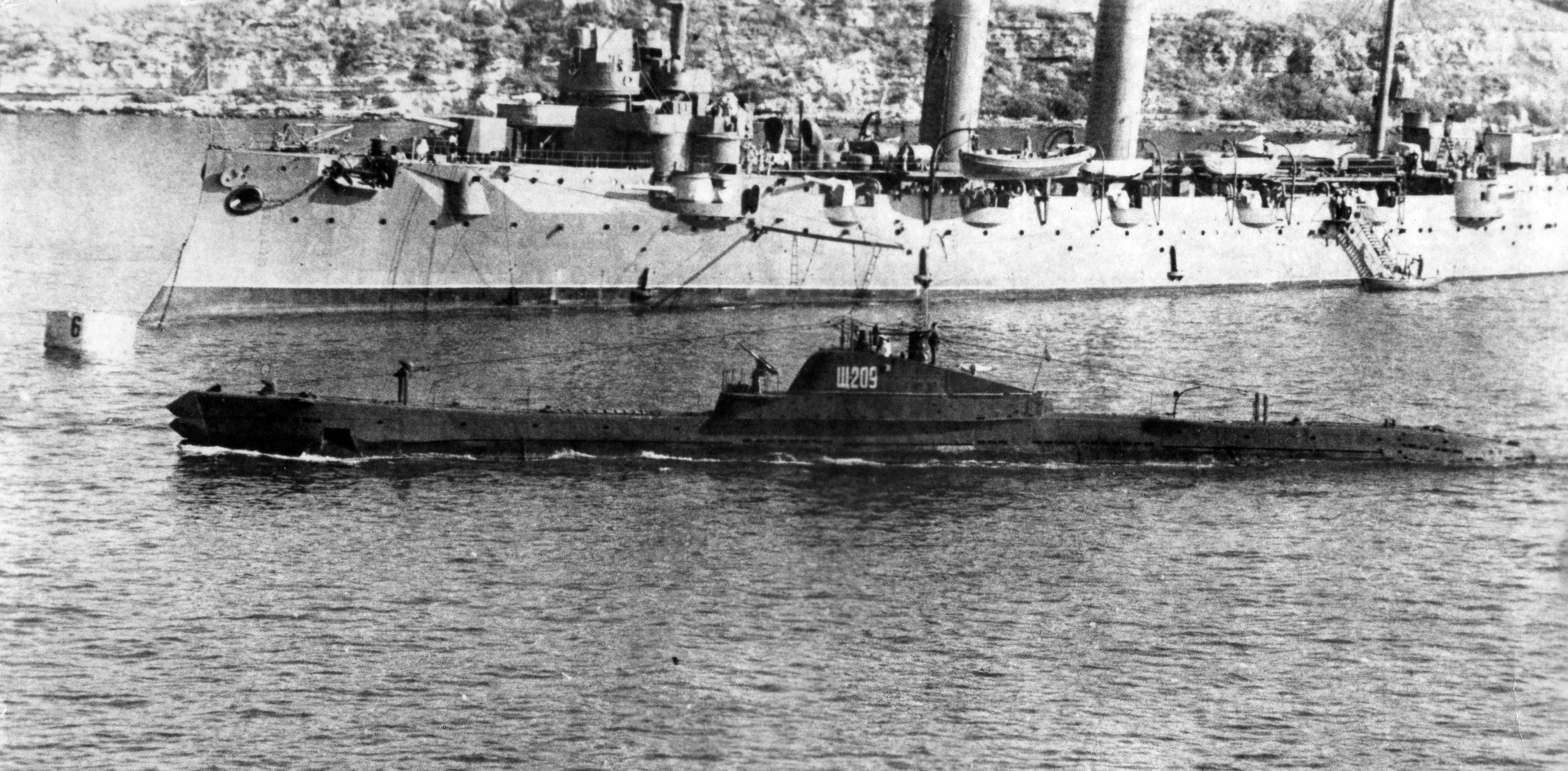
Shch-209 alongside the Soviet cruiser Komintern

- Shch-201
- Shch-202
- Shch-203 (Sunk on 26 August 1943 by Italian midget submarine CB-4)
- Shch-204 (lost 6 December 1941; wreck found in 1984)
- Shch-205
- Shch-206 (Sunk by a group consisting of the Romanian torpedo boat Năluca, the Romanian gunboat Stihi Eugen and three Romanian motor torpedo boats on 9 July 1941)
- Shch-207
- Shch-208 (Sunk on 26 August 1942 by a mine of a flanking barrage laid by the Romanian minelayers Amiral Murgescu and Dacia)
- Shch-209
- Shch-210 (Sunk on 12 March 1942 off Cape Shabla by a mine in the Romanian minefield S-15, laid by the Romanian minelayers Amiral Murgescu, Regele Carol I and Dacia)
- Shch-211 (Sunk on 16 November 1941 by a mine of a flanking barrage laid by the Romanian minelayers Amiral Murgescu and Dacia)
- Shch-212 (Sunk on 11 December 1942 near Fidonisi Island off the coast of Sulina by a Romanian minefield, laid by the Romanian minelayers Amiral Murgescu, Regele Carol I and Dacia)
- Shch-213 (Sunk on 14 October 1942 off Constanța by a mine, in a minefield laid by the Romanian minelayers Amiral Murgescu, Regele Carol I and Aurora; wreck found 15 November 2008, identified on 13 September 2010)
- Shch-214 (sunk 19 June 1942 near Cape Ai-Todor by Italian motor torpedo boat MAS-571)
- Shch-215 (renamed S-215 in 1949)
- Shch-216 (lost 17 February 1944; wreck found July 2013)

=== Baltic Fleet ===
Shch-310, Shch-302, Shch-303 and Shch-304 of the Baltic Fleet constituted the original Series III Shchukas

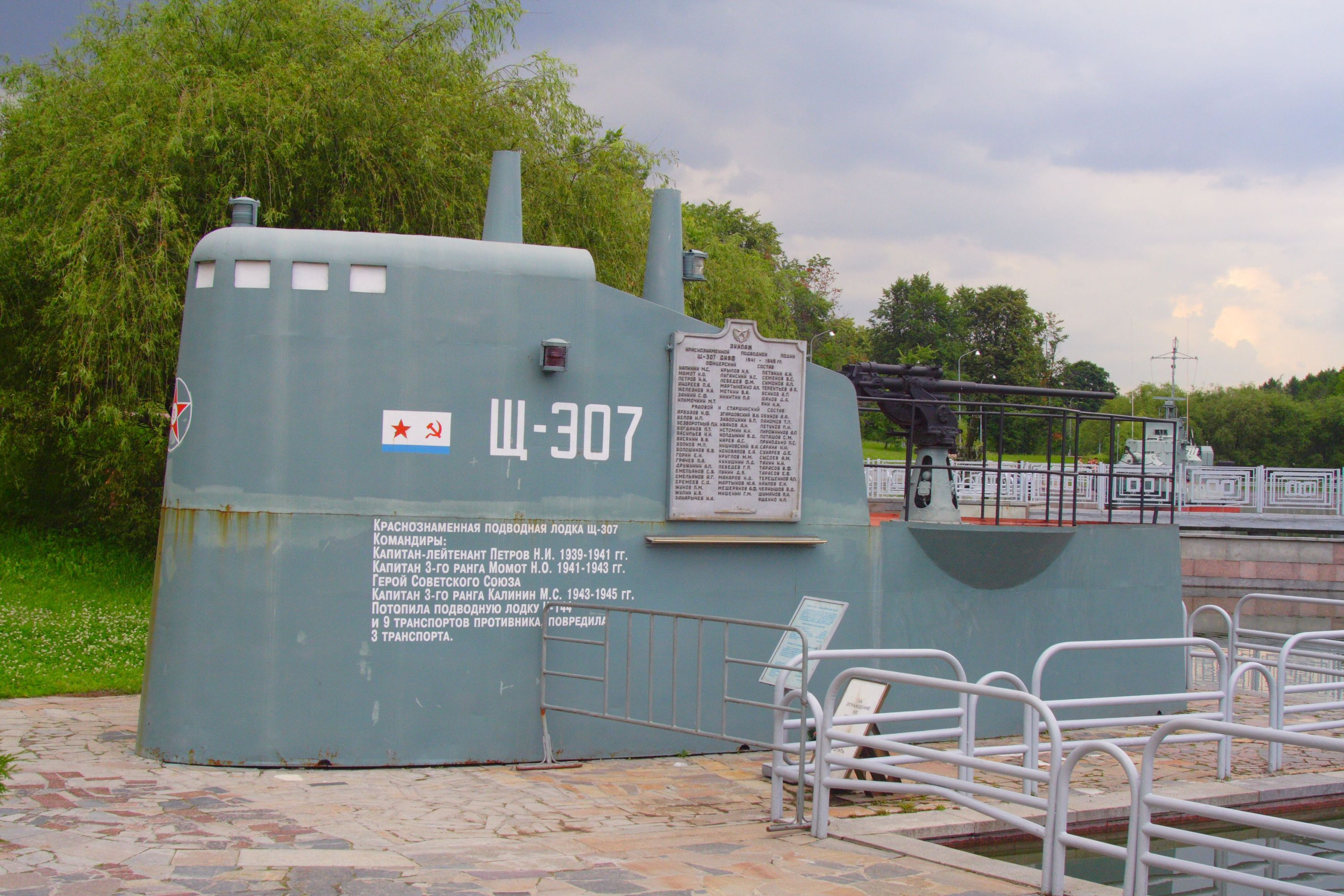
The preserved conning tower of Shch-307, a member of Series V-bis-2, at Poklonnaya Gora, Moscow

- Shch-301 (lost 28 August 1941)
- Shch-302 (lost October 1942)
- Shch-303 - failed to sink Soviet freighter Metallist with two torpedoes, used by Admiral Nikolai Kuznetsov to accuse Polish submarine ORP Orzeł after the Orzeł incident, as a pretext to seize Estonia.
- Shch-304 (lost November 1942)
- Shch-305 (Sunk 5 November 1942 by Finnish submarine Vetehinen)
- Shch-306 (lost 12 November 1942)
- Shch-307
- Shch-308 (lost 26 October 1942)
- Shch-309
- Shch-310
- Shch-311 (lost 12 October 1942)
- Shch-315
- Shch-317 (lost 15 July 1942; wreck found 2 May 2018)
- Shch-318
- Shch-319 (lost 29 September 1941)
- Shch-320 (lost 27 October 1942)
- Shch-322 (lost 11 October 1941)
- Shch-323 (lost 1 May 1943)
- Shch-324 (lost 5 November 1941)

=== Northern Fleet ===
The Northern Fleet's Shch-405, Shch-406, Shch-407, Shch-408, Shch-411 and Shch-412 were in Series X-bis

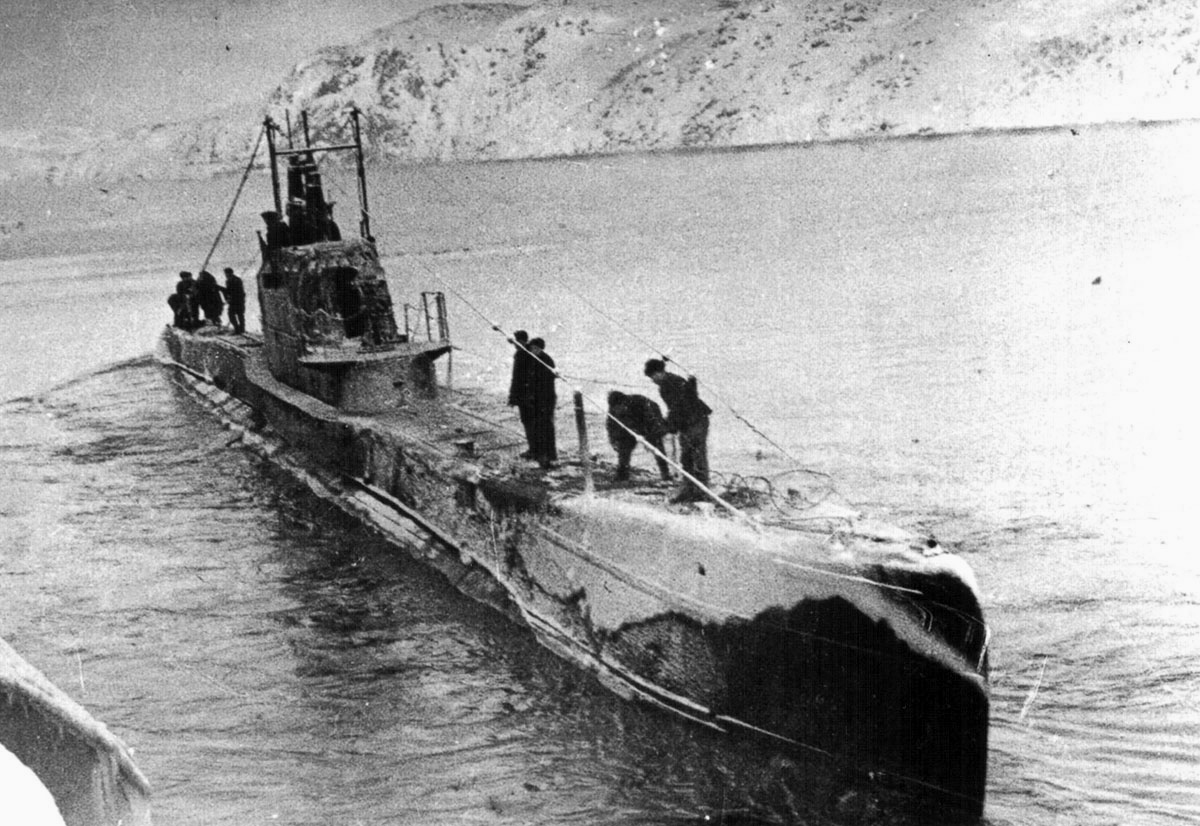
Shch-401, a Series X Shchuka of the Northern Fleet, before the USSR's entry into World War II

- Shch-401 (lost 23 April 1942)
- Shch-402 (lost 21 September 1944)
- Shch-403 (lost 2 October 1943)
- Shch-404
- Shch-405 (lost 13 July 1942)
- Shch-406 (lost 29 May 1943)
- Shch-407
- Shch-408 (lost 25 May 1943)
- Shch-411
- Shch-413 (scrapped before completion in July 1941)
- Shch-414 (scrapped before completion in July 1941)
- Shch-421 (lost 9 April 1942)
- Shch-422 (lost 5 July 1943)
- Shch-424 (lost 20 October 1939)

== See also ==
"Shchuka" is a traditional Russian/Soviet submarine name, often given to the first submarine of a new class of a new generation of submarines. For instance, the first submarine of the early 20th century Som class carried the name. Also at least two other, newer Soviet/Russian submarine classes carries the name, however, the NATO reporting names differ. These are the Project 671 Shchuka (NATO: Victor III) and Project 971 Shchuka-B (Akula).

== Bibliography ==
- Budzbon, Przemysław (1980). "Soviet Union". In Chesneau, Roger (ed.). Conway's All the World's Fighting Ships 1922–1946. Conway Maritime Press. pp. 318–346. ISBN 0-85177-146-7.
- Budzbon, Przemysław & Radziemski, Jan (2020). "The Beginnings of Soviet Naval Power". In Jordan, John (ed.). Warship 2020. Osprey. pp. 82–101. ISBN 978-1-4728-4071-4.
- Budzbon, Przemysław; Radziemski, Jan & Twardowski, Marek (2022). Warships of the Soviet Fleets 1939–1945. Vol. I: Major Combatants. Naval Institute Press. ISBN 978-1-68247-877-6.
- Rohwer, Jürgen & Monakov, Mikhail S. (2001). Stalin's Ocean-Going Fleet: Soviet Naval Strategy and Shipbuilding Programs 1935–1953. Frank Cass. ISBN 0-7146-4895-7.
- Westwood, J. N. (1994). Russian Naval Construction, 1905–45. Macmillan. ISBN 0-333-55553-8.
