= Soviet submarine M-111 =

Soviet short-range attack submarine used in World War II

- Scheme of series XII

History

Soviet Union
- Name: М-111
- Builder: Krasnoye Sormovo (Gorkiy, USSR) / Yard 112
- Laid down: 30 October 1939
- Launched: 31 December 1940
- Commissioned: 5 July 1941
- Decommissioned: 2 October 1954

General characteristics
- Class & type: Malyutka-class, Serie XII submarine
- Displacement: 206 tons surfaced; 256 tons submerged
- Length: 37.5 m (123 ft)
- Beam: 3.3 m (11 ft)
- Draught: 2.9 m (9.5 ft)
- Speed: 14.1 knots (26 km/h) surfaced; 8.2 knots (15 km/h) submerged
- Complement: 20
- Armament: 2 × 533 mm (533 mm) torpedo tubes in bow; 2 × anti-submarine/anti-ship torpedoes no reloads; 1 × 45 mm/46 21-K semi-automatic deck gun

The Soviet submarine М-111 was a Malyutka-class (Series XII) short-range, diesel-powered attack submarine of the Soviet Navy. She was part of the Black Sea Fleet and operated during the World War II against Axis shipping, her commander was the Georgian-ethnic Yaroslav Iosseliani before he was moved to another vessel.

== Service history ==
M-111 served in the southern Black Sea, attacking Axis shipping with torpedoes.

Ships sunk by M-111
| Date | Ship | Flag | Tonnage | Notes |
|---|---|---|---|---|
| 18 July 1943 | Dunarea-1 | (Kingdom of Romania) | 505 GRT | barge (torpedo) |
| 28 August 1943 | Hainburg | (Nazi Germany) | 400 GRT | tug (torpedo) |
| 12 November 1943 | Theoderich | (Nazi Germany) | 3814 GRT | merchant(torpedo) |
| Total: | | | 4,719 GRT | |
