= Soviet submarine M-172 =

Soviet Navy submarine, launched 1936

- Scheme of series XII

History

Soviet Union
- Name: М-172
- Builder: Sudomekh (Leningrad, USSR) / Yard 196
- Laid down: 17 June 1936
- Launched: 23 July 1937
- Commissioned: 11 December 1937
- Fate: Missing since 1 October 1943

General characteristics
- Class & type: Malyutka-class, Serie XII submarine
- Displacement: 206 tons surfaced; 256 tons submerged
- Length: 37.5 m (123 ft)
- Beam: 3.3 m (11 ft)
- Draught: 2.9 m (9.5 ft)
- Speed: 14.1 knots (26 km/h) surfaced; 8.2 knots (15 km/h) submerged
- Complement: 20
- Armament: 2 × 533 mm (21 in) bow torpedo tubes; 2 × anti-submarine/anti-ship torpedoes, no reloads; 1 × 45 mm/46 21-K semi-automatic deck gun

The Soviet submarine М-172 was a Malyutka-class (Series XII) short-range, diesel-powered attack submarine of the Soviet Navy. She was part of the Northern Fleet and operated during World War II against Axis shipping. Her commander was the Jewish Israel Fisanovich before he was moved to another vessel, where he died due to friendly fire.

== Service history ==
M-172 served in the Northern Fleet, attacking Axis shipping in Norwegian waters. A number of attacks were done, but they resulted in just a single confirmed victory. M-172 departed for the last mission on 1 October 1943, never returning: it is likely she sunk on a German defensive barrage of naval mines.

Ships sunk by M-172
Date	Ship	Flag	Tonnage	Notes
1 February 1943	V-6115 / Ostwind	(Nazi Germany)	560 GRT	patrol ship (torpedo)
Total:			560 GRT	
