= Soviet submarine M-35 =

- Scheme of series XII

History

Soviet Union
- Name: М-35
- Builder: Krasnoye Sormovo (Gorkiy, USSR) / Yard 112
- Laid down: 22 February 1939
- Launched: 20 August 1940
- Commissioned: 24 February 1941
- Decommissioned: 20 June 1956

General characteristics
- Class & type: Malyutka-class, Serie XII submarine
- Displacement: 206 tons surfaced; 256 tons submerged
- Length: 37.5 m (123 ft)
- Beam: 3.3 m (11 ft)
- Draught: 2.9 m (9.5 ft)
- Speed: 14.1 knots (26 km/h) surfaced; 8.2 knots (15 km/h) submerged
- Complement: 20
- Armament: 2 × 533 mm (533 mm) torpedo tubes in bow; 2 × anti-submarine/anti-ship torpedoes no reloads; 1 × 45 mm/46 21-K semi-automatic deck gun

The Soviet submarine М-35 was a Malyutka-class (Series XII) short-range, diesel-powered attack submarine of the Soviet Navy. She was part of the Black Sea Fleet and operated during the World War II against Axis shipping.

== Service history ==
M-35 served in the southern Black Sea, attacking Axis shipping with torpedoes and artillery.

Ships sunk by M-35
Date	Ship	Flag	Tonnage	Notes
26 October 1941	SF-25	(Nazi Germany)	140 GRT	barge (artillery)
26 October 1941	SF-36	(Nazi Germany)	140 GRT	barge (artillery)(driven ashore)
21 October 1941	Le Progress	(Nazi Germany)	511 GRT	tanker(torpedo)
2 November 1943	SNR-1293	(Nazi Germany)	? GRT	barge(torpedo)
11 May 1943	?	(Nazi Germany)	? GRT	barge(torpedo)(claimed)
Total:			791 GRT	
