= HMS Sunfish (81S) =

Submarine

Coordinates: 54°28′N 7°11′E

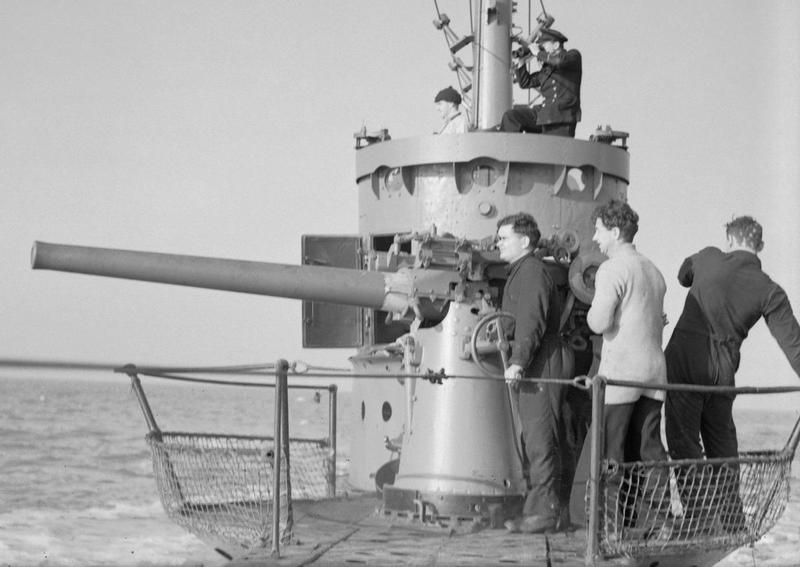
- Crew of the Sunfish operating the deck gun.

History

United Kingdom
- Name: Sunfish
- Builder: Chatham Dockyard
- Laid down: 22 July 1935
- Launched: 30 September 1936
- Commissioned: 2 July 1937
- Fate: Lent to the Soviet Union as V 1, 1944
- Badge

Soviet Union
- Name: V 1
- Acquired: on loan from UK, 1944
- Fate: Sunk, 27 July 1944

General characteristics
- Class & type: S-class submarine
- Displacement: 670 long tons (681 t) (surfaced); 960 long tons (975 t) (submerged)
- Length: 208 ft 9 in (63.63 m)
- Beam: 24 ft (7.3 m)
- Draught: 10 ft 6 in (3.20 m)
- Propulsion: Twin diesel/electric
- Speed: 13.75 kn (15.82 mph; 25.47 km/h) (surfaced); 10 kn (12 mph; 19 km/h) (submerged)
- Complement: 39
- Armament: 6 × bow 21 inch (533 mm) torpedo tubes (12 torpedoes); 1 × 3-inch (76 mm) deck gun; 1 × .303 in (7.7 mm) machine gun

HMS Sunfish was a Royal Navy S-class submarine which was launched on 30 September 1936 and served in the Second World War. Sunfish is one of 12 boats named in the song Twelve Little S-Boats.

== Service history ==
At the onset of the Second World War, Sunfish was a member of the 2nd Submarine Flotilla. From 26–29 August 1939, the flotilla deployed to its war bases at Dundee and Blyth.

She spent an eventful period with the Royal Navy on the outbreak of war, and was commanded for much of her career in the war by Lieutenant Commander J.E. Slaughter. In February 1940, she attacked the German U-boat U-14, but missed, and in April sank two German merchant ships, Amasis and Antares, and narrowly missed Hanau and an auxiliary patrol vessel.

She torpedoed two German 'Q ships' that month, damaging Schürbek (Schiff 40) on 12 April and sinking Oldenburg (Schiff 35) on 14 April 1940. On 7 December 1940, she sank the Finnish merchant Oscar Midling and damaged the Norwegian merchant Dixie off Norway.

Sunfish was transferred to the Soviet Navy in 1944 and renamed V-1.

She did not spend long under Soviet command, being bombed and sunk in error by an RAF Coastal Command Liberator off Norway, during passage from Dundee to Murmansk on 27 July 1944. Her commander – Capt. 2nd rank Fisanovich – had allegedly taken her out of her assigned area and she was diving when the aircraft came in sight instead of staying on the surface and firing recognition signals as instructed. All crew – including the British liaison staff – were lost. However, both the Royal Navy and RAF inquiries found that the RAF aircrew, who were at least 80 miles off course and who ignored unmistakable signs that the submarine was friendly, were fully responsible. The submarine's 50 Soviet and one British crew are all commemorated on Dundee International Submarine Memorial.

== See also ==
- Media related to HMS Sunfish at Wikimedia Commons

== Sources ==
- Colledge, J. J.; Warlow, Ben (2006) [1969]. Ships of the Royal Navy: The Complete Record of All Fighting Ships of the Royal Navy from the 15th Century to the Present (3rd Rev ed.). London: Chatham Publishing. ISBN 978-1-86176-281-8. OCLC 67375475.
- Gröner, Erich; Jung, Dieter; Maass, Martin (1993). Die deutschen Kriegsschiffe 1815-1945 (in German). Vol. 8/I: Flußfahrzeuge, Ujäger, Vorpostenboote, Hilfsminensucher, Küstenschutzverbände (Teil 1). Koblenz: Bernard & Graefe. ISBN 3-7637-4807-5.
- Haarr, Geier H. (2009). The German Invasion of Norway: April 1940. Barnsley, UK: Seaforth Publishing. ISBN 978-1-78346-967-3.
- Rohwer, Jürgen (2005). Chronology of the War at Sea 1939–1945: The Naval History of World War Two (Revised & Expanded ed.). Annapolis, Maryland: Naval Institute Press. ISBN 1-59114-119-2.
