= Soviet cruiser Voroshilov =

Soviet Navy's Kirov-class cruiser

- Voroshilov

History

Soviet Union
- Name: Voroshilov
- Namesake: Kliment Voroshilov
- Builder: Marti South
- Yard number: 297
- Laid down: 15 October 1935
- Launched: 28 June 1937
- Commissioned: 20 June 1940
- Out of service: 6 October 1972
- Renamed: 31 December 1961 as OS-24
- Reclassified: 31 December 1961 as an experimental ship
- Refit: April 1954 – 31 December 1961
- Honors and awards: Order of the Red Banner, 8 July 1945
- Fate: Sold for scrap 2 March 1973

General characteristics (Project 26)
- Class & type: Kirov-class cruiser
- Displacement: 7,890 t (7,770 long tons) (standard)
- Length: 191.3 m (627 ft 7 in)
- Beam: 17.66 m (57 ft 11 in)
- Draught: 6.15 m (20 ft 2 in) (full load)
- Installed power: 6 water-tube boilers; 122,500 shp (91,300 kW)
- Propulsion: 2 shafts; geared steam turbines
- Speed: 36.72 knots (68.01 km/h; 42.26 mph) (on trials)
- Endurance: 2,140 nmi (3,960 km; 2,460 mi) at 18 knots (33 km/h; 21 mph)
- Complement: 872
- Sensors & processing systems: Arktur hydrophone
- Armament: 3 × triple 180 mm (7.1 in) guns; 6 × single 100 mm (3.9 in) DP guns; 6 × single 45 mm (1.8 in) AA guns; 4 × single 12.7 mm (0.50 in) AA machine guns; 2 × triple 533 mm (21 in) torpedo tubes; 96–164 mines; 50 depth charges
- Armor: Waterline belt: 50 mm (2.0 in); Deck: 50 mm (2.0 in) each; Turrets: 50 mm (2.0 in); Barbettes: 50 mm (2.0 in); Conning tower: 150 mm (5.9 in)
- Aircraft carried: 2 × KOR-1 seaplanes
- Aviation facilities: 1 Heinkel catapult

Voroshilov (Russian: Ворошилов) was a Project 26 Kirov-class cruiser of the Soviet Navy that served during World War II and into the Cold War. She bombarded German troops during the siege of Odessa before being badly damaged in November 1941 by German bombers. Upon her return from repairs in March 1942 she supported Soviet troops during the siege of Sevastopol, the Kerch–Feodosiya operation and the amphibious landings at Novorossiysk at the end of January 1943. Her active participation in the war ended in October 1943 when three destroyers were lost to air attack and Joseph Stalin forbade missions using large ships without his permission. Postwar she was converted to a missile test ship before being sold for scrap in 1973.

== Description ==
Voroshilov was 191.3 meters (627 ft 7 in) long, had a beam of 17.66 meters (57 ft 11 in) and had a draft of 6.15 meters (20 ft 2 in). She displaced 7,890 metric tons (7,765 long tons) at standard load and 9,436 metric tons (9,287 long tons) at full load. Her two steam turbines proved to be more powerful than anticipated, producing a total of 122,500 shaft horsepower (91,300 kW). This was almost enough to achieve the ship's designed speed of 37 knots during her sea trials, reaching 36.72 knots (68.01 km/h; 42.26 mph) despite being over 650 metric tons (640 long tons) overweight.

The ship's main battery consisted of nine 180-millimeter (7.1 in) B-1-P guns in three electrically powered MK-3-180 triple turrets. Six single 100-millimeter (3.9 in) B-34 dual-purpose guns comprised her secondary armament which were fitted on each side of the rear funnel. The ship's light anti-aircraft (AA) guns consisted of six semi-automatic 45-millimeter (1.8 in) 21-K AA guns and four DK 12.7-millimeter (0.50 in) machine guns. Six 533-millimeter (21.0 in) 39-Yu torpedo tubes were fitted in two triple mountings.

=== Wartime modifications ===
When war broke out in 1941, Voroshilov was not equipped with any radars, but she received a number of British Lend-Lease radars by 1944. One Type 284 and two Type 285 radars were used for main battery fire control. One Type 291 was used for air search, while anti-aircraft fire control was provided by two Type 282 radars.

== Service ==
Voroshilov was laid down at the Marti South shipyard in Nikolayev on 15 October 1935; the second of the Project 26, to use their industrial designation, Kirov-class cruisers. She was launched on 28 June 1937, but she had to wait for her Soviet-built machinery to be delivered before she was completed on 20 June 1940. On 26 June 1941 Voroshilov covered Soviet destroyers bombarding Constanta, after the Axis powers invaded the Soviet Union, and was slightly damaged by a mine exploded by the destroyer Soobrazitelny's paravanes. She bombarded Axis troops near Odessa on 19 September with 148 shells from her main guns and was transferred to Novorossiysk shortly afterwards. On 2 November the ship was bombed in harbor by Junkers Ju 88 bombers of Kampfgeschwader 51. She was hit twice; one hit started a fire in #3 magazine that was extinguished by water flooding in from the second hit. Voroshilov had to be towed to Poti for repairs, which lasted until February 1942. She shelled Axis positions near Feodosiya on 19 March and 3 April 1942, but was damaged by fragments from bombs from Ju 88s on 10 April and had to return to Batumi for minor repairs.

On 8 and 11 May she provided fire support for Soviet troops around Kerch and the Taman Peninsula. On 27 May one of her turbines broke down, while helping to transfer the 9th Naval Infantry Brigade from Batumi to Sevastopol, and required repairs lasting until 24 July. On 1 December, while she was bombarding the then-Romanian Snake Island together with the destroyer Soobrazitelny, the cruiser was damaged by Romanian mines, but she managed to return to Poti for repairs under her own power. During the brief bombardment, she fired forty-six 180 mm and fifty-seven 100 mm shells, which struck the radio station, barracks and lighthouse on the island, but failed to inflict significant losses. After her repairs were completed she provided naval gunfire support for Soviet forces landing behind German lines at Malaya Zemlya at the end of January 1943. On 17 February the ship transferred from Poti to Batumi.

Voroshilov was withdrawn from active operations, however, after the loss of three destroyers that were attempting to interdict the German evacuation of the Taman Bridgehead to air attack on 6 October 1943. This loss caused Stalin to forbid the deployment of large naval units without his express permission which was not granted during the rest of the war. The ship was transferred to Novorossiysk on 18 August 1944 and to Sevastopol on 5 November. She was awarded the Order of the Red Banner on 8 July 1945.

== Postwar ==
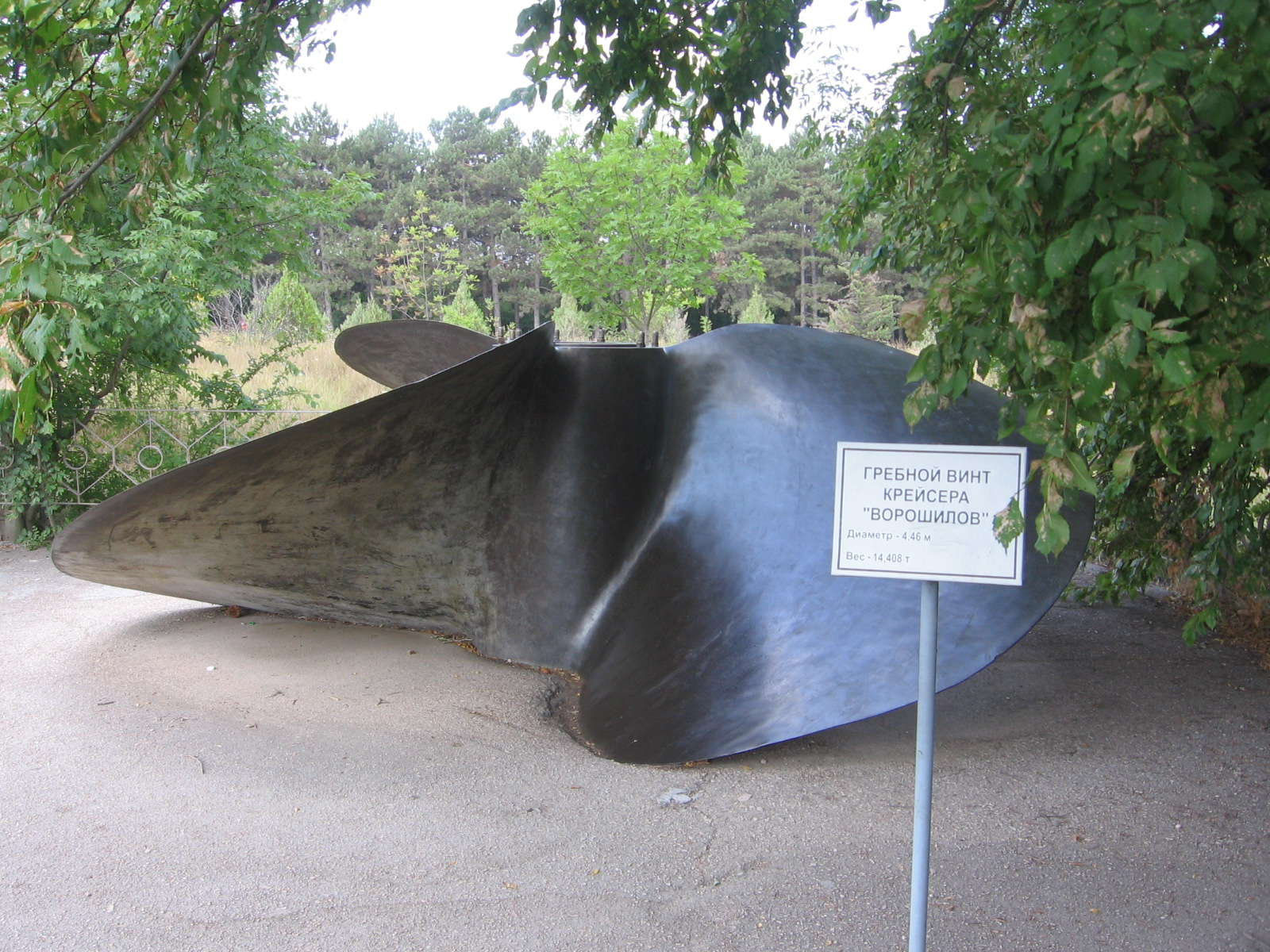
14-ton propeller from Voroshilov on display in Sevastopol

Voroshilov was inspected in 1946 and found unsatisfactory, but she was given routine servicing. She began her postwar modernization in April 1954, but the Navy reevaluated the scope of the work in 1955 and deemed it insufficient to create a fully modern ship. Unlike her half-sister Maxim Gorky, she was selected for conversion as a testbed for missile development as Project 33 on 17 February 1956. The conversion process was prolonged, as her armament was removed and she received an entirely new superstructure and masts. She was recommissioned as OS-24 on 31 December 1961. The ship was modernized under Project 33M from 11 October 1963 to 1 December 1965. Her final conversion was to a floating barracks on 6 October 1972 and she was redesignated as PKZ-19. Voroshilov was sold for scrap on 2 March 1973. Voroshilov's 14-ton propeller and 2.5-ton stop anchor are on display at the Museum of Heroic Defense and Liberation of Sevastopol on Sapun Mountain in Sevastopol.
