= NMS Aurora =

Minelayer, sunk in 1941

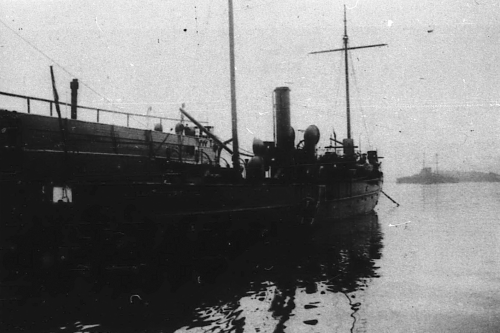
- Aurora as KuK Basilisk

History

Austria-Hungary
- Name: Basilisk
- Namesake: Basilisk
- Builder: STT Shipyard, Austria-Hungary
- Laid down: 1901
- Launched: 28 November 1902
- Completed: 21 February 1903
- Out of service: 1919
- Fate: Ceded to France

France
- Name: Aurore
- Namesake: Aurora
- Commissioned: 1920
- Out of service: 1922
- Fate: Transferred to Romania

Romania
- Name: Aurora
- Commissioned: 1922
- Out of service: 1927
- Refit: Galați shipyard, 1937-1939
- Reinstated: 1939
- Fate: Sunk by Soviet aircraft, 1941

Service record
- Commanders: Lieutenant-Commander Stan Baicu
- Operations: Soviet invasion of Bessarabia; Operation München
- Victories: Contribution to the sinking of 1 destroyer leader

General characteristics (as built)
- Type: Minelayer
- Displacement: 314 tons
- Length: 46 m (150 ft 11 in)
- Beam: 7.9 m (25 ft 11 in)
- Draft: 1.5 m (4 ft 11 in)
- Installed power: 410 kW (550 hp)
- Propulsion: 1 cylindrical boiler, 1 triple-expansion engine, 1 shaft
- Speed: 11 knots (20 km/h; 13 mph)
- Complement: 40
- Armament: 2 × 47 mm Škoda L/44 naval guns; 2 x 8 mm machine guns; 145 x mines

NMS Aurora was a small minelayer of the Romanian Navy. After initially serving in the Austro-Hungarian Navy during World War I and later in the French Navy, she was transferred to Romania and fought during World War II, being sunk in July 1941.

== Construction and career ==
Initially named Basilisk, the vessel was laid down at the Stabilimento Tecnico Triestino shipyard in 1901. She was launched on 28 November 1902, and was completed on 21 February 1903. She served during World War I as one of the four minelayers of the Austro-Hungarian Navy. Basilisk displaced 314 tons, measuring 46 meters in length, with a beam of 7.9 meters and a draught of 1.5 meters. One cylindrical boiler and one set triple-expansion engine generated an output of 550 hp, giving her a top speed of 11 knots. Her armament consisted of two 47 mm Škoda L/44 naval guns, two 8 mm machine guns and 145 mines. She had a crew of 40. Following Austria-Hungary's defeat in 1918, the vessel was ceded to France as a war prize in 1920 under the terms of the Treaty of Saint-Germain-en-Laye and renamed Aurore.

She was transferred to Romania in 1922 and renamed Aurora. However, she was decommissioned five years later and sold for merchant service to the Romanian Danube Navigation Company (SRD - Societate Anonima Româna de Navigatie pe Dunare), Bucharest. In 1937, she was requisitioned by the Romanian Navy and underwent an extensive refit at the Galați shipyard, until 1939, when she was recommissioned as a minelayer.

=== World War II ===
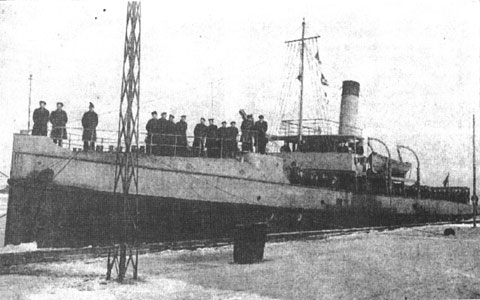
Aurora in 1940

Aurora laid her first mine barrage in the morning of 30 June, off Sulina, during the Soviet invasion of Bessarabia . Lieutenant-Commander Stan Baicu commanded her. A second barrage was laid during the night of 10–11 January 1941. She laid a third barrage in the area on 27–28 June 1941. Between 16 and 19 June 1941, she and two other Romanian minelayers, Amiral Murgescu and Regele Carol I (converted merchant ship), laid a barrage of 1,000 mines between Cape Midia and Tuzla, to protect the main Romanian port of Constanța. The mines laid off Constanța would later sink a Soviet destroyer leader during the 26 June Soviet raid on the port. Aurora herself was sunk on 15 July at Sulina during Operation München by Soviet aircraft.
