= NMS Amiral Murgescu =

WW2 Romanian Navy minelayer & convoy escort

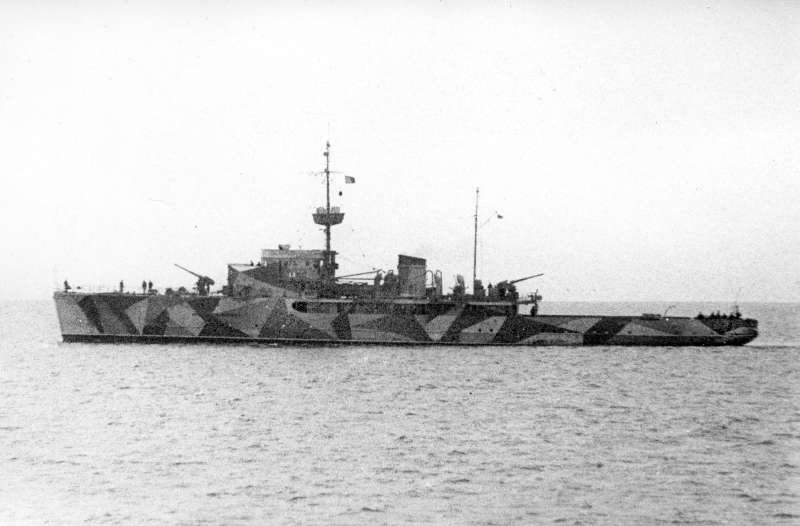
- Amiral Murgescu at sea

Class overview
- Name: Amiral Murgescu-class escort minelayer
- Builders: Galați shipyard, Romania (Amiral Murgescu); Blohm & Voss, Hamburg (Cetatea Albă)
- Operators: Romanian Naval Forces; Soviet Navy
- Preceded by: Alexandru cel Bun-class minelayer
- Built: 1938–1941
- In commission: 1941–1988
- Planned: 4
- Completed: 2
- Retired: 2

History

Romania
- Name: Amiral Murgescu
- Namesake: Admiral Ioan Murgescu
- Builder: Galați shipyard, Romania
- Laid down: 1 August 1938
- Launched: 14 June 1939
- Commissioned: 2 March 1941
- Captured: By the Soviet Union, 1944

Soviet Union
- Name: Don
- Namesake: River Don
- Acquired: 1944
- Commissioned: 1944
- Stricken: 27 May 1988
- Fate: Sold for scrap, 4 July 1988

Service record
- Commanders: Alexandru Dumbravă (1941–1942); Ovidiu Mărgineanu (1942–1943); Gheorghe Harting (1943); Anton Foca (1943–1944)
- Operations: Black Sea campaigns (1941–44); Raid on Constanța; Evacuation of the Crimea; Snake Island Campaign; Romanian Navy during the Second World War
- Victories: 1 cruiser damaged; 1 destroyer leader, 1 R-boat, 1 S-boat, 2 motor gunboats and up to 12 submarines sunk; 12 aircraft destroyed
- Awards: Order of the Crown (Romania); Order of the Star of Romania

General characteristics
- Type: Minelayer/Escort vessel
- Displacement: 812 tons (standard); 1,068 tons (full load)
- Length: 76.9 m (252 ft 4 in)
- Beam: 9.1 m (29 ft 10 in)
- Draught: 2.5 m (8 ft 2 in)
- Propulsion: 2 Krupp diesel engines 1,600 kW (2,100 hp), 2 shafts
- Speed: 16 knots (30 km/h; 18 mph)
- Range: 3,400 nautical miles (6,300 km; 3,900 mi)
- Complement: 135
- Armament: 2 x 105 mm SK C/32 naval/AA guns; 2 x 37 mm Rheinmetall AA guns; 4 × 20 mm Oerlikon AA guns; 2 × 13 mm M1929 twin machine guns; 2 x depth charge throwers; 65 x depth charges; 135 x mines; 1 x motor launch armed with: 1 × 20 mm Oerlikon AA gun; 1 x 8 mm machine gun; 6 x depth charges

NMS Amiral Murgescu was a minelayer and convoy escort of the Romanian Navy, the first sea-going warship built in Romania and the largest Romanian-built warship of World War II. She laid numerous minefields, from the Bulgarian port of Burgas to the Crimean port of Sevastopol, which inflicted significant losses to the Soviet Black Sea Fleet. She also carried out numerous convoy escort missions and took part in the Axis evacuation of the Crimea in May 1944. Due to her success in combat, she was decorated twice by May 1944. She was captured by the Soviet Union in September 1944 and served until 1988, when she was scrapped.

== Description ==
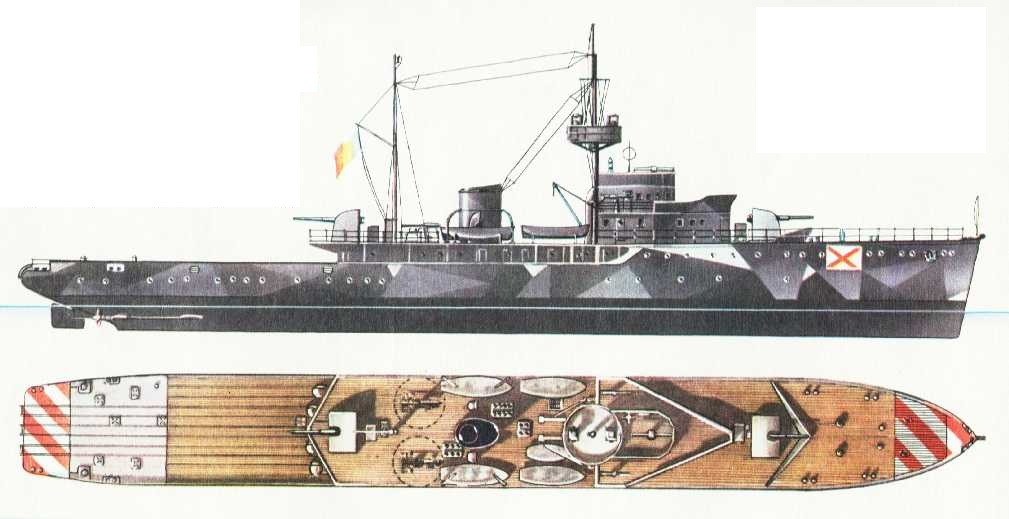
Diagram of Amiral Murgescu (note the gun shields which were removed after her first weeks of service)

Amiral Murgescu was laid down on 1 August 1938 and launched on 14 June 1939. Her full-load displacement amounted to 1,068 tons while her standard displacement was of 812 tons. She measured 76.9 meters in length, with a beam of 9.1 meters and a draught of 2.5 meters. She was armed with two 105 mm SK C/32 dual-purpose naval/AA guns, two Rheinmetall 37 mm guns, four Oerlikon 20 mm guns and two twin 13 mm machine guns. She was also fitted with two depth charge throwers and could carry up to 200 mines and depth charges (135 mines and 65 depth charges). Her two main guns were initially protected by gun shields, however these were removed in July 1941 in order to facilitate anti-aircraft fire. Amiral Murgescu had a crew of up to 135 and was powered by two Krupp diesel engines generating 780 kilowatts (1,050 hp) each, giving her a top speed of 30 km/h (16 kn) and a range of 6,300 kilometres (3,400 nmi).

=== Motor launch ===
Amiral Murgescu was also able to carry and operate one minesweeping motor launch. This launch was part of a class of four 9-ton vessels armed each with one 20 mm anti-aircraft gun, one 8 mm machine gun and 6 depth charges.

== Operational history ==
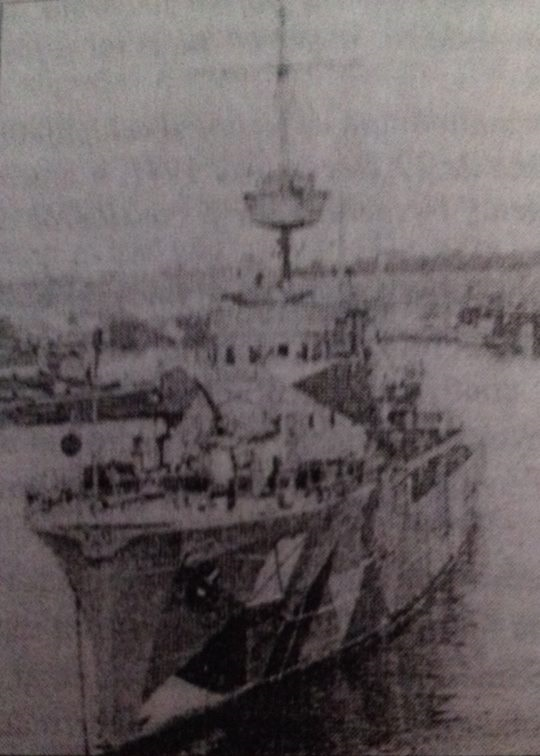
Amiral Murgescu (front view)

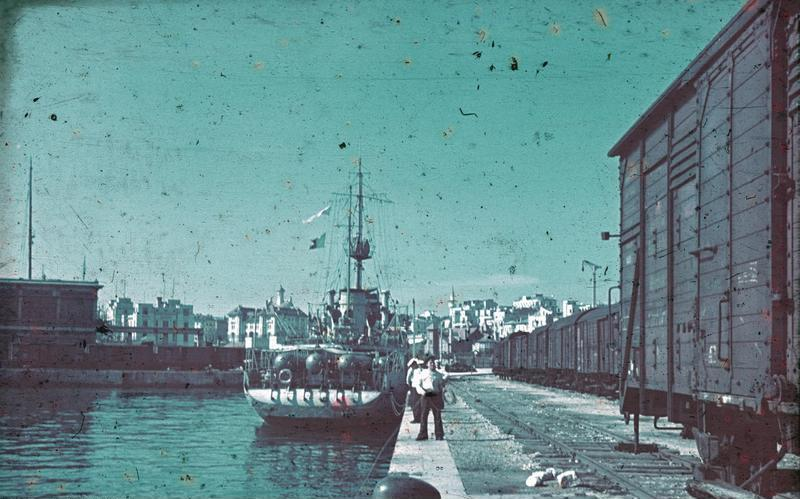
Amiral Murgescu loaded with mines and ready to depart, Constanța, October 1941

== Romanian service ==
She had four captains across the war: Alexandru Dumbravă (1941–1942), Ovidiu Mărgineanu (1942–1943), Gheorghe Harting (1943) and Anton Foca (1943–1944).

Amiral Murgescu was commissioned on 2 March 1941. Her first mission was between 16 and 19 June 1941, when she and two other Romanian minelayers, Regele Carol I and Aurora, laid a barrage of 1,000 mines between Cape Midia and Tuzla, to protect the main Romanian port of Constanța. When the Soviet Black Sea Fleet attacked the port on 26 June, she helped repel the attack, together with the flotilla leader Mărăști and the destroyer Regina Maria and the German coastal battery Tirpitz. The Soviet destroyer leader Moskva was sunk by Romanian mines and the cruiser Voroshilov was damaged. Amiral Murgescu also shot down two Soviet aircraft on that same day. Later, the Soviet submarine Shch-213 and 3 more Soviet submarines (M-58, M-34 and Shch-208) were sunk by Romanian mines near Constanța. The German R-boat R-36 was also sunk by Romanian mines near Constanța in 1943.

During a Soviet air raid on 23 June 1941, two of her crewmen were wounded. On a subsequent raid which took place the following day, she shot down two Soviet aircraft, her first aerial kills.

On 25 June, Amiral Murgescu shot down three Soviet aircraft in 15 minutes.

During a Soviet air attack on Constanța on 5 August, she shot down three more aircraft.

Her next mission was between 7 and 16 October 1941. Together with the Romanian minelayers Regele Carol I and Dacia and escorted by the Romanian 250t-class torpedo boats Năluca, Sborul and Smeul, Romanian gunboats Sublocotenent Ghiculescu and Căpitan Dumitrescu and Bulgarian torpedo boats Drazki, Smeli and Hrabri, she laid four full minefields and one partial minefield along the Bulgarian coast. These mines later sank 4 Soviet submarines (S-34, L-24, Shch-210 and Shch-211).

In February 1942, she participated in a minelaying operation near Sulina, at the mouth of the Danube.

On 24 June 1942, she laid mines near Odessa along with Dacia, while being escorted by the Romanian destroyers Regele Ferdinand and Regina Maria, the flotilla leader Mărășești, the Romanian gunboats Ghiculescu, Stihi and Dumitrescu and the Romanian torpedo boat Smeul as well as motor minesweepers of the Donau Flotilla. The mines laid near Odessa later sank the Soviet submarines M-33 and M-60 and the motor gunboats YA-26 and YA-27.

On 29–30 October and 5 November 1942, she along with Dacia and the Romanian destroyers Regina Maria and Regele Ferdinand, the Romanian leader Mărăști, the Romanian gunboat Stihi and four German R-boats laid two mine barrages to protect Snake Island. These mines sank the Soviet submarine Shch-212 on 11 December that same year. The Soviet submarine M-31 was either sunk as well by the Romanian mine barrages near the island on 17 December, or sunk with depth charges by the Romanian leader Mărășești on 7 July 1943. On 1 December 1942, while the Soviet cruiser Voroshilov together with the destroyer Soobrazitelny were bombarding the island with forty-six 180 mm and fifty-seven 100 mm shells, the cruiser was damaged by Romanian mines, but she managed to return to Poti for repairs under her own power. During the brief bombardment, she struck the radio station, barracks and lighthouse on the island, but failed to inflict significant losses.

On the night of 13–14 September 1943, Amiral Murgescu, escorted by two Romanian destroyers, laid mines off Sevastopol. On 15 September, she along with two German auxiliary minelayers, escorted by six R-boats and the German armed ship Xanten, laid a barrage of mines that closed the mouth of the Gulf of Kherson.

When not used as minelayer, Amiral Murgescu was employed as an escort ship. She participated in a total of 16 escort missions, mainly between Constanța and Sevastopol, between November 1942 and September 1943. One of these missions, on 19–20 July 1943, was carried out solely by her. On 15 April 1944, a convoy she was escorting during the evacuation of the Crimea was attacked five times by Soviet bombers. She shot down two of them, but one of her main guns and one 20 mm gun were damaged.

On 12 May 1944, she was the last Romanian warship to leave Crimea during the evacuation of the peninsula by the Axis. Commanded by Lieutenant Commander Anton Foca, she evacuated about 1,000 troops, including the highly decorated German General Walter Hartmann.

On 25–26 May, she and Dacia, escorted by the destroyer Regina Maria, the leader Mărășești, the torpedo boats Sborul and Smeul and the motor torpedo boats Vedenia and Viscolul, laid another barrage of mines off Sulina to reinforce the existing one. The mines laid off Sulina sank the German S-boat S-148 on 22 August 1944.

On 29 May 1944, she was decorated with the Order of the Star of Romania. She was also decorated with the Order of the Romanian Crown.

== Soviet service ==
After the 23 August 1944 coup, she was captured by Soviet forces and commissioned as Don. She was converted to training ship on 2 April 1945, to depot ship on 18 January 1947, to command ship on 9 February 1948, to disarmed barracks ship on 7 May 1956 (renamed PKZ-107) and finally to repair ship on 4 January 1958 (renamed PM-76, PMR-76 from 8 June 1966), being finally taken out of service on 27 May 1988 and sold for scrap on 4 July 1988.

== Cetatea Albă ==
Four ships of this class were planned, but only Amiral Murgescu was completed by Romania. She had one sister ship, Cetatea Albă. She was laid down in 1939, but abandoned at an early stage. Her construction was transferred to Germany and in 1940 she was completed by the Blohm & Voss shipyard in Hamburg. Cetatea Albă had the same standard displacement and top speed as her sister. It is not known, however, if her armament consisted of more than two four-inch (102 mm) dual-purpose main guns, two 37 mm anti-aircraft guns and 135 mines. Cetatea Albă was likely never commissioned.

== Cancelled sister ships and their replacements ==
The other two planned vessels were replaced by smaller warships. One of the substitutes was the old but recently rebuilt minelayer Aurora, commissioned in 1939. With a top speed of 20 knots, she was faster than Amiral Murgescu, but far less suitable for escort missions: her small size allowed for only two twin 13 mm machine guns to be carried, in addition to her load of 40 mines. The other replacement was the ex-French gunboat Remus Lepri, built in 1917. She was acquired by Romania after the end of World War I, along with three sister ships. This 400-ton gunboat, part of the Ghiculescu-class, was also fitted with minelaying equipment. However, she proved to be unsuitable as a minelayer, being accidentally sunk by an explosion during trials on 11 January 1941.
