= Dundee International Submarine Memorial =

Coordinates: 56.4630°N 2.956243°W

Dundee International Submarine Memorial commemorates the 296 sailors and commandos lost on operations from the submarine base at Dundee in Scotland, HMS Ambrose, during World War II.

== Background ==
Dundee in Scotland was the home port of the Royal Navy’s 2nd Submarine Flotilla between August and October 1939. From 18 April 1940 until the end of the Second World War, Dundee was the base of the 9th Submarine Flotilla, a unique international flotilla which included crews from Poland, the Netherlands, France and Norway after those countries were invaded and occupied by the Nazi regime. Russian submarine crews also operated from Dundee during the summer of 1944.

Dundee-based submarines patrolled the enemy-held coastline of mainland Europe, attacking enemy warships including the battle-cruiser Gneisenau, and the cruiser Prinz Eugen, and ventured far inside the Arctic Circle to help protect convoys carrying war supplies to the Soviet Union.

Enemy supply convoys were attacked, and, using intelligence provided by Bletchley Park, U-boats heading for the North Atlantic convoy routes were intercepted. HMS Satyr’s numerous successes included sinking U-987 off Norway, and HMS Venturer remains the only submarine ever to have sunk another - U-864 - while both boats were submerged. The Free French Rubis laid minefields and torpedoed enemy shipping in both Norwegian coastal waters and the Bay of Biscay, while another Free French boat, Minerve, limped back to Dundee badly damaged and leaking after being sunk to the seabed by depth charges. And, in support of the Norwegian resistance movement, agents, teams of saboteurs, weapons and supplies were landed under cover of darkness, often deep inside enemy-held fjords.

Six British, Dutch, Norwegian and Russian submarines were lost while on patrol from Dundee and two hundred and ninety six British, Dutch, Free French, Norwegian and Russian sailors and commandos lost their lives, few of whom have any known grave.

== The memorial ==
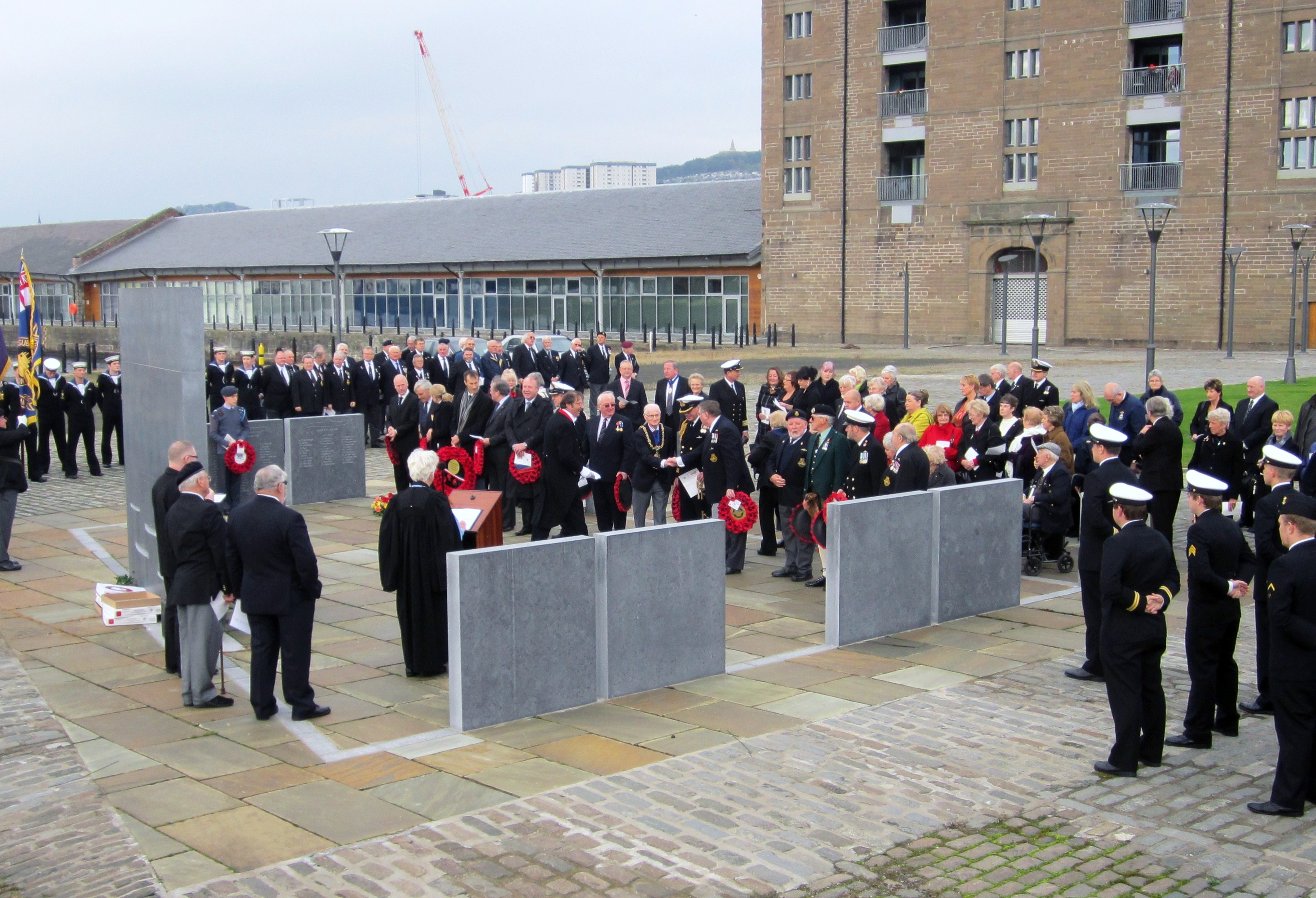
International Memorial Service, October 2011

Dundee International Submarine Memorial was dedicated on 17 September 2009. It commemorates the crews who are "Still on Patrol" and honours the gallantry of all the submariners who went on patrol from the River Tay during the Second World War. The memorial is sited between Victoria and Camperdown docks in Dundee Harbour, an appropriate location as the two docks were much used by the wartime submarines.

=== Still on patrol - the lost Dundee submarines ===
- HMS Oxley. Sunk in error by HMS Triton on 10 September 1939. Fifty-three of her crew lost, two survivors.
- HMS Thames. Lost, probably in a German minefield early in August 1940 after attacking the German battlecruiser Gneisenau. All 64 crew lost.
- HNLMS O 13. Lost, possibly in a German minefield, during a patrol in the North Sea. All 31 Dutch and three British crew killed.
- HNLMS O 22. Lost due to unknown cause, but most likely a German mine, while on patrol off south-west Norway. All 42 Dutch and three British crew killed. Wreck discovered 40 miles off the coast of south-west Norway in 1993.
- HNoMS Uredd. Hit a German mine while on patrol near the port of Bodø in North Norway and sank. All 32 Norwegian and three British crew lost along with seven Kompani Linge and MI6 agents in transit to occupied Norway. Wreck discovered in Fugløy Fjord in 1985 now a designated war grave.
- V-1 (ex-HMS Sunfish). Sailed from Dundee to join the Soviet Northern Fleet, but sunk in error by the RAF off the coast of Norway in 1944. All 51 Soviet and British crew lost.
