= Soviet destroyer Statny =

Statny (Russian: Статный, lit. 'Stately') is the name of the following ships of the Soviet Navy:

- Soviet destroyer Statny (1939), a Storozhevoy-class destroyer sunk during a storm in 1941
- Soviet destroyer Statny (1949), a Skory-class destroyer
