= Number 31-class motor launch =

Class overview
- Name: Number 31-class motor launch
- Operators: Romanian Naval Forces
- Built: 1921
- Completed: 4

General characteristics
- Displacement: 9 tons
- Armament: 1 × 20 mm Oerlikon AA gun; 1 x 8 mm machine gun; 6 x depth charges

The Number 31 class was a group of four small multi-purpose motor launches of the Royal Romanian Navy. They served on the Danube and in the Black Sea aboard the escort minelayer Amiral Murgescu.

The four launches were acquired in 1921, each displacing 9 tons. Numbered 31-34, they were each armed with 6 depth charges, one 20 mm anti-aircraft gun and one 8 mm machine gun. They were also employed as minesweepers.

During the first month of Operation Barbarossa, as part of the prelude to Operation München, two of the Danube launches supported the Romanian 15th Marine Infantry Battalion in its successful defense of the Stipoc Island in the Danube Delta against Soviet attacks.

One of these launches was carried by the Romanian escort minelayer Amiral Murgescu. In the summer of 1941, this launch was used to sweep a mine and bring it ashore, where it was defused.
