= Soviet submarine Shch-310 =

1936 Soviet Navy Shchuka-class submarine

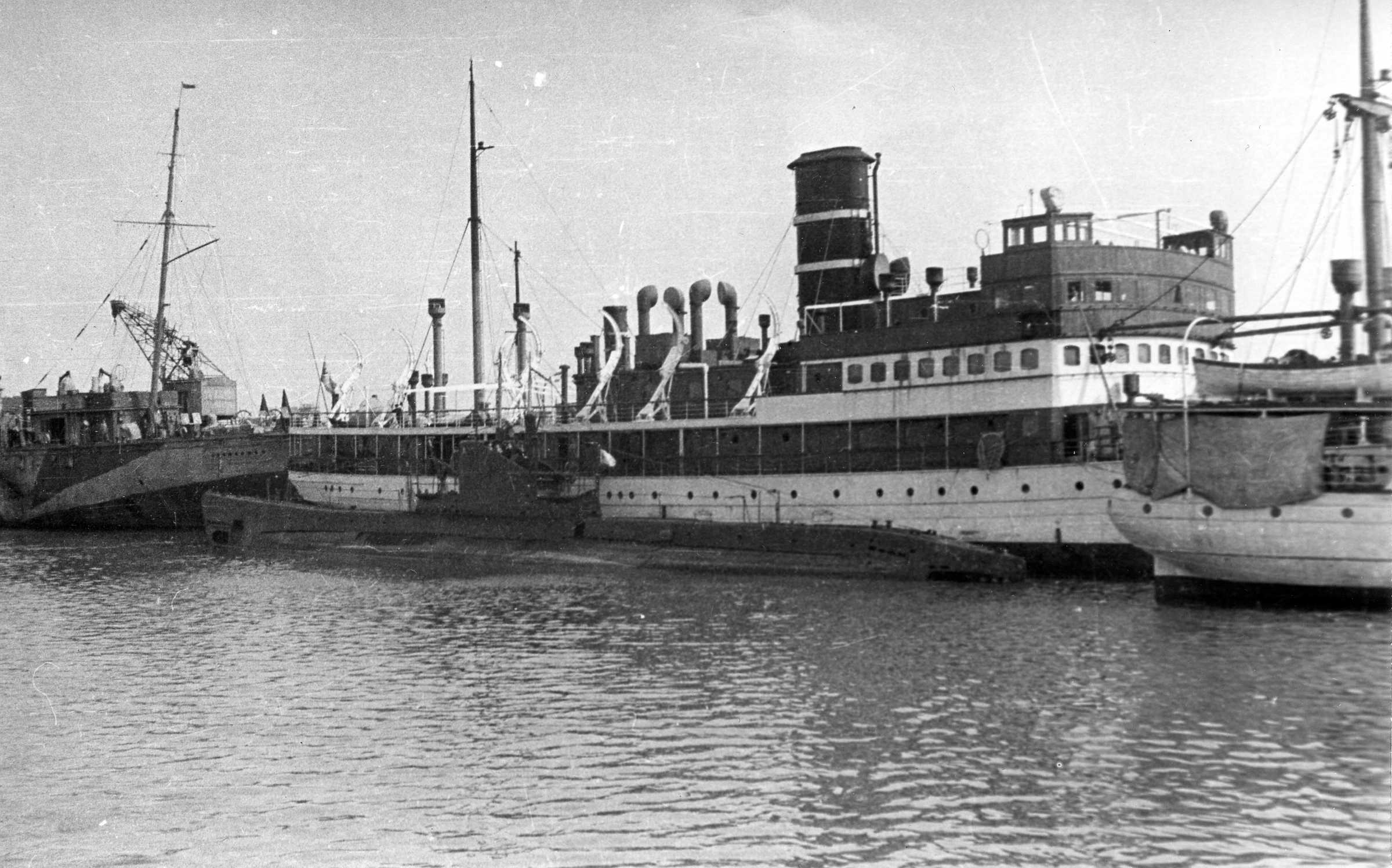
- Shch-310 next to a steamship in 1944

History

Soviet Union
- Name: Shch-310
- Ordered: Mid-1933
- Builder: Krasnoye Sormovo Factory No. 112, Gorki
- Laid down: 6 November 1933
- Launched: 10 April 1935
- Completed: 17 September 1936
- Commissioned: 21 August 1936
- Decommissioned: 17 August 1953
- Renamed: From Belukha, 15 September 1934; To S-310, 1949

General characteristics
- Class & type: Series V-bis-2 Shchuka-class submarine
- Displacement: 591 t (582 long tons) (surfaced); 708 t (697 long tons) (submerged)
- Length: 58.75 m (192 ft 9 in)
- Beam: 6.20 m (20 ft 4 in)
- Draught: 4.22 m (13 ft 10 in) (mean)
- Installed power: 1,010 kW (1,370 PS) (diesel); 590 kW (800 PS) (electric)
- Propulsion: 2-shaft diesel electric; 2 diesel engines; 2 electric motors
- Speed: 13.5 knots (25.0 km/h; 15.5 mph) (surfaced); 8 knots (15 km/h; 9.2 mph) (submerged)
- Range: 5,100 nmi (9,400 km; 5,900 mi) at 8.35 knots (15.46 km/h; 9.61 mph); 104 nmi (193 km; 120 mi) at 2.74 knots (5.07 km/h; 3.15 mph) (submerged)
- Test depth: 75 m (246 ft)
- Complement: 39
- Armament: 4 × bow 533 mm (21 in) torpedo tubes; 2 × stern 533 mm (21 in) torpedo tubes; 2 × 45 mm (1.8 in) deck guns

Shch-310 was a Series V-bis-2 Shchuka-class submarine built for the Soviet Navy in the 1930s under the name of Belukha, but was renamed Shch-310 while under construction. Completed in 1936, she was assigned to the Baltic Fleet. The boat played a minor role during the 1939–1940 Winter War with Finland and in the Second World War. Shch-310 participated in the defense of the Soviet Union after the Axis powers invaded in June 1941 (Operation Barbarossa), but only made six patrols during the war, sinking three or four ships. Shch-310 was renamed S-310 in 1949. She was stricken from the navy list in 1953 and was either scuttled during a training exercise or scrapped in 1958.

== Background and description ==
The Series V-bis-2 Shchuka-class submarines were improved versions of the Series V-bis boats placed into production because Soviet shipyards were having difficulties integrating new German technology. The boats displaced 591 metric tons (582 long tons) surfaced and 708 t (697 long tons) submerged. They had an overall length of 58.75 meters (193 ft), a beam of 6.2 meters (20 ft 4 in), and a mean draft of 4.22 meters (14 ft). The boats had a diving depth of 75 m (246 ft). Their crew numbered 39 officers and crewmen.

For surface running, the Series V-bis-2 boats were powered by a pair of 38V-8 diesel engines, one per propeller shaft. The engines produced a total of 1,370 metric horsepower (1,008 kW), enough to give them a speed of 13.5 knots (25.0 km/h; 15.5 mph) due to better streamlining of the hull. When submerged each shaft was driven by a 400-metric-horsepower (294 kW) PGV8 electric motor for 8 knots (15 km/h; 9.2 mph). The boats had a surface endurance of 5,100 nautical miles (9,400 km; 5,900 mi) at 8.35 knots (15.46 km/h; 9.61 mph) and 104 nmi (193 km; 120 mi) at 2.74 knots (5.07 km/h; 3.15 mph) submerged.

The Series V-bis-2 boats were armed with six 533-millimeter (21 in) torpedo tubes. Four of these were in the bow and the others were in the stern. They carried four reloads for the bow tubes. The submarines were also equipped with a pair of 45-millimeter (2 in) 21-K deck guns fore and aft on the conning tower.

== Construction and career ==
Shch-310 was laid down by Krasnoye Sormovo Factory No. 112 in Gorky on 6 November 1933 with the name of Belukha. She was renamed Shch-310 on 15 September 1934 and launched on 10 April 1935. The submarine was commissioned on 21 August 1936 into the Baltic Fleet. During the Winter War the ship made two patrols in the Baltic Sea.

When the Axis powers invaded on 22 June, she was patrolling in the Eastern Baltic and moved to defend the entrance of the Gulf of Finland the following day. Shch-310 penetrated the Axis mine barrage defending the exit from the Gulf of Finland in September 1942. While patrolling between Cape Rozewie, Poland, and Bornholm Island, the submarine sank one small merchant ship and missed another. Improved Axis anti-submarine defenses at the exit from the Gulf of Finland in 1943 prevented any patrols in the Baltic, but the liberation of Estonia in September 1944 destroyed those and Shch-310 is the first submarine to venture forth. While patrolling off Ventspils, Latvia, she sank the 4,499-gross register ton (GRT) transport Ro-24 and a dredger in early October, although her attacks on a steamship and an oil tanker were unsuccessful. During a later patrol in December 1944–January 1945, the submarine made four unsuccessful attacks off Liepāja, Latvia. Four months later, Shch-310 again patrolled off Liepāja, sinking a small freighter, but missed hitting ships on 5 different days in March and April.

The submarine was renamed S-310 in 1949 and was stricken on 17 August 1953. She was either scuttled during a training exercise or broken up in Liepāja in 1958.

A wreck of a submarine was found near the island of Ruhnu in 2011, that is according to Estonian underwater archeologist Vello Mäss(et) and the Estonian National Heritage Board(et), the remains of the S-310, that was sunken in 1958 during exercises.

== Claims ==
Ships sunk by Shch-310
Date	Ship	Flag	Tonnage	Notes
29 September 1942	Franz Rudolf	(Nazi Germany)	1,419 GRT	freighter (torpedo)
8 October 1944	Bagger-3	(Nazi Germany)	300 GRT	dredger (torpedo)
8 October 1944	Ro-24	(Nazi Germany)	4,499 GRT	transport ship (torpedo)
10 April 1945	Ilmenau	(Nazi Germany)	1,201 GRT	freighter (torpedo)(unconfirmed)
Total:			7,419 GRT	

== Bibliography ==
- Budzbon, Przemysław; Radziemski, Jan & Twardowski, Marek (2022). Warships of the Soviet Fleets 1939–1945. Vol. I: Major Combatants. Annapolis, Maryland: Naval Institute Press. ISBN 978-1-68247-877-6.
- Polmar, Norman & Noot, Jurrien (1991). Submarines of the Russian and Soviet Navies, 1718–1990. Annapolis, Maryland: Naval Institute Press. ISBN 0-87021-570-1.
- Rohwer, Jürgen (2005). Chronology of the War at Sea 1939–1945: The Naval History of World War Two (Third Revised ed.). Annapolis, Maryland: Naval Institute Press. ISBN 1-59114-119-2.
